= Alliance of Women Film Journalists =

American non-profit organization

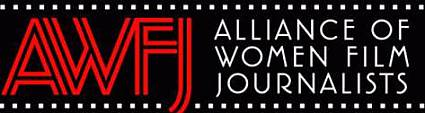
- Formation: 2006
- Website: awfj.org

The Alliance of Women Film Journalists (AWFJ) is a non-profit organization founded in 2006. It is based in New York City and is dedicated to supporting work by and about women in the film industry. The AWFJ is composed of 84 professional female movie critics, journalists, and feature writers working in print, broadcast, and online media. The British Film Institute describes the AWFJ as an organization that collects articles by its (mainly U.S.-based) members, gives annual awards, and "supports films by and about women".

== EDA Awards ==
Winners and nominees
Best of Awards	2007	2008	2009	2010	2011	2012	2013	2014	2015	2016	2017	2018	2019	2020	2021	2022	2023	2024	2025
Female Focus Awards	2007	2008	2009	2010	2011	2012	2013	2014	2015	2016	2017	2018	2019	2020	2021	2022	2023	2024	2025
Special Mention Awards	2007	2008	2009	2010	2011	2012	2013	2014	2015	2016	2017	2018	2019	2020	2021	2022	2023		

Beginning in 2007, the group annually gives awards to the best (and worst) in film, as voted on by its members. These awards are called EDAs in honor of AWFJ founder Jennifer Merin's mother, actress Eda Reiss Merin. EDA is also an acronym for Excellent Dynamic Activism. These awards have been reported on in recent years by a number of mainstream media sources including Time, USA Today, and Variety, and are also included in The New York Times' movie reviews awards lists. In 2007, AWFJ released a Top 100 Films List in response to the American Film Institute revision of their 100 Years, 100 Films list. In creating their list, the AWFJ was motivated by the fact that only 4.5 out of 400 films on AFI's ballot were directed by women.

In addition to awards for achievement granted regardless of gender (Best Film, Best Director, Best Original Screenplay, Best Screenplay Adapted, Best Documentary, Best Animated Film, Best Ensemble Cast, Best Editing, Best Cinematography, Best Film Music or Score, and Best Non-English-Language Film), there are also "EDA Female Focus Awards" (Best Woman Director, Best Woman Screenwriter, Kick Ass Award For Best Female Action Star, Best Animated Female, Best Breakthrough Performance, Best Newcomer, Women's Image Award, Sexist Pig Award, Hanging in There Award for Persistence, Actress Defying Age and Agism, Lifetime Achievement Award, Award for Humanitarian Activism, Female Icon Award, and This Year's Outstanding Achievement by a Woman in the Film Industry) and "EDA Special Mention Awards" (Hall of Shame Award, Actress Most in Need of a New Agent, Movie You Wanted to Love But Just Couldn't, Unforgettable Moment Award, Best Depiction of Nudity, Sexuality, or Seduction, Most Egregious Age Difference Between Leading Man and Love Interest, Bravest Performance Award, Best Leap from Actress to Director Award, Cultural Crossover Award, Sequel or Remake That Shouldn't Have Been Made Award, and Best of the Fests).

== EDA Best of Awards winners and nominees ==
Table key
(WON)	Indicates the winner

Year	Category	Nominee	Ref.
2007	Best Film	No Country for Old Men (WON)	
2007	Best Film	Atonement	
2007	Best Film	The Diving Bell and the Butterfly	
2007	Best Film	Into the Wild	
2007	Best Director	Joel Coen and Ethan Coen – No Country for Old Men (WON)	
2007	Best Director	Sean Penn – Into the Wild	
2007	Best Director	Sarah Polley – Away from Her	
2007	Best Director	Julian Schnabel – The Diving Bell and the Butterfly	
2007	Best Original Screenplay	Juno – Diablo Cody (WON)	
2007	Best Original Screenplay	Lars and the Real Girl – Nancy Oliver	
2007	Best Original Screenplay	Michael Clayton – Tony Gilroy	
2007	Best Original Screenplay	The Savages – Tamara Jenkins	
2007	Best Screenplay, Adapted	Away from Her – Sarah Polley (WON)	
2007	Best Screenplay, Adapted	Atonement – Christopher Hampton	
2007	Best Screenplay, Adapted	The Diving Bell and the Butterfly – Ronald Harwood	
2007	Best Screenplay, Adapted	No Country for Old Men – Joel Coen and Ethan Coen	
2007	Best Screenplay, Adapted	Persepolis – Marjane Satrapi and Vincent Paronnaud	
2007	Best Documentary	No End in Sight – Charles Ferguson (WON)	
2007	Best Documentary	The Cats of Mirikitani – Linda Hattendorf	
2007	Best Documentary	My Kid Could Paint That – Amir Bar-Lev	
2007	Best Documentary	Sicko – Michael Moore	
2007	Best Actress	Julie Christie – Away from Her (WON)	
2007	Best Actress	Marion Cotillard – La Vie en Rose	
2007	Best Actress	Laura Linney – The Savages	
2007	Best Actress	Elliot Page (Note: Credited as Ellen Page) – Juno	
2007	Best Actress in Supporting Role	Amy Ryan – Gone Baby Gone (WON)	
2007	Best Actress in Supporting Role	Cate Blanchett – I'm Not There	
2007	Best Actress in Supporting Role	Jennifer Jason Leigh – Margot at the Wedding	
2007	Best Actress in Supporting Role	Emily Mortimer – Lars and the Real Girl	
2007	Best Actress in Supporting Role	Tilda Swinton – Michael Clayton	
2007	Best Actor	Daniel Day-Lewis – There Will Be Blood (WON)	
2007	Best Actor	Johnny Depp – Sweeney Todd: The Demon Barber of Fleet Street	
2007	Best Actor	Tommy Lee Jones – In the Valley of Elah	
2007	Best Actor	Viggo Mortensen – Eastern Promises	
2007	Best Actor in Supporting Role	Tom Wilkinson – Michael Clayton (WON)	
2007	Best Actor in Supporting Role	Casey Affleck – The Assassination of Jesse James by the Coward Robert Ford	
2007	Best Actor in Supporting Role	Javier Bardem – No Country for Old Men	
2007	Best Actor in Supporting Role	Hal Holbrook – Into the Wild	
2007	Best Ensemble Cast	Juno (WON)	
2007	Best Ensemble Cast	Before the Devil Knows You're Dead	
2007	Best Ensemble Cast	Michael Clayton	
2007	Best Ensemble Cast	Talk to Me	
2007	Best Editing	The Diving Bell and the Butterfly – Juliette Welfling (WON)	
2007	Best Editing	Atonement – Paul Tothill	
2007	Best Editing	I'm Not There – Jay Rabinowitz	
2007	Best Editing	No Country for Old Men – Roderick Jaynes	
2007	Best Foreign Film	The Diving Bell and the Butterfly – Julian Schnabel (WON)	
2007	Best Foreign Film	4 Months, 3 Weeks and 2 Days – Cristian Mungiu	
2007	Best Foreign Film	Golden Door – Emanuele Crialese	
2007	Best Foreign Film	Lust, Caution – Ang Lee	
2007	Best Foreign Film	Persepolis – Marjane Satrapi and Vincent Paronnaud	
2008	Best Film	Slumdog Millionaire (WON)	
2008	Best Film	Happy-Go-Lucky	
2008	Best Film	Milk	
2008	Best Director	Danny Boyle – Slumdog Millionaire (WON)	
2008	Best Director	Mike Leigh – Happy-Go-Lucky	
2008	Best Director	Gus Van Sant – Milk	
2008	Best Screenplay, Original	WALL-E – Andrew Stanton, Peter Docter, and Jim Reardon (WON)	
2008	Best Screenplay, Original	Ballast – Lance Hammer	
2008	Best Screenplay, Original	Frozen River – Courtney Hunt	
2008	Best Screenplay, Original	Happy-Go-Lucky – Mike Leigh	
2008	Best Screenplay, Original	The Visitor – Tom McCarthy	
2008	Best Screenplay, Adapted	Frost/Nixon – Peter Morgan (WON)	
2008	Best Screenplay, Adapted	The Reader – David Hare	
2008	Best Screenplay, Adapted	Slumdog Millionaire – Simon Beaufoy	
2008	Best Documentary	Man on Wire – James Marsh (WON) (TIE)	
2008	Best Documentary	Trouble the Water – Tia Lessin and Carl Deal (WON) (TIE)	
2008	Best Documentary	Standard Operating Procedure – Errol Morris	
2008	Best Actress	Sally Hawkins – Happy-Go-Lucky (WON) (TIE)	
2008	Best Actress	Kate Winslet – The Reader and Revolutionary Road (WON) (TIE)	
2008	Best Actress	Meryl Streep – Doubt	
2008	Best Actress	Michelle Williams – Wendy and Lucy	
2008	Best Actress in Supporting Role	Viola Davis – Doubt (WON)	
2008	Best Actress in Supporting Role	Penélope Cruz – Vicky Cristina Barcelona	
2008	Best Actress in Supporting Role	Taraji P. Henson – The Curious Case of Benjamin Button	
2008	Best Actor	Sean Penn – Milk (WON)	
2008	Best Actor	Richard Jenkins – The Visitor	
2008	Best Actor	Mickey Rourke – The Wrestler	
2008	Best Actor in Supporting Role	Heath Ledger – The Dark Knight (WON)	
2008	Best Actor in Supporting Role	Robert Downey Jr. – Tropic Thunder	
2008	Best Actor in Supporting Role	Eddie Marsan – Happy-Go-Lucky	
2008	Best Ensemble Cast	Rachel Getting Married (WON)	
2008	Best Ensemble Cast	A Christmas Tale	
2008	Best Ensemble Cast	Happy-Go-Lucky	
2008	Best Ensemble Cast	Milk	
2008	Best Editing	The Curious Case of Benjamin Button – Kirk Baxter and Angus Wall (WON)	
2008	Best Editing	Frost/Nixon – Daniel P. Hanley and Mike Hill	
2008	Best Editing	Shine a Light – David Tedeschi	
2008	Best Foreign Film	Tell No One – Guillaume Canet (WON)	
2008	Best Foreign Film	A Christmas Tale – Arnaud Desplechin	
2008	Best Foreign Film	I've Loved You So Long – Philippe Claudel	
2009	Best Film	The Hurt Locker (WON)	
2009	Best Film	An Education	
2009	Best Film	Precious	
2009	Best Film	Up in the Air	
2009	Best Animated Film	Up (WON)	
2009	Best Animated Film	Coraline	
2009	Best Animated Film	Fantastic Mr. Fox	
2009	Best Director	Kathryn Bigelow – The Hurt Locker (WON)	
2009	Best Director	Jason Reitman – Up in the Air	
2009	Best Director	Quentin Tarantino – Inglourious Basterds	
2009	Best Screenplay, Original	(500) Days of Summer – Scott Neustadter and Michael H. Weber (WON)	
2009	Best Screenplay, Original	The Hurt Locker – Mark Boal	
2009	Best Screenplay, Original	A Serious Man – Joel Coen and Ethan Coen	
2009	Best Screenplay, Adapted	Up in the Air – Jason Reitman and Sheldon Turner (WON)	
2009	Best Screenplay, Adapted	An Education – Nick Hornby	
2009	Best Screenplay, Adapted	Precious – Geoffrey Fletcher	
2009	Best Documentary	The Cove – Louis Psihoyos (WON)	
2009	Best Documentary	Anvil! The Story of Anvil – Sacha Gervasi	
2009	Best Documentary	Food, Inc. – Robert Kenner	
2009	Best Actress	Carey Mulligan – An Education (WON)	
2009	Best Actress	Gabourey Sidibe – Precious	
2009	Best Actress	Meryl Streep – Julie & Julia	
2009	Best Actress in Supporting Role	Mo'Nique – Precious (WON)	
2009	Best Actress in Supporting Role	Vera Farmiga – Up in the Air	
2009	Best Actress in Supporting Role	Anna Kendrick – Up in the Air	
2009	Best Actor	Jeff Bridges – Crazy Heart (WON)	
2009	Best Actor	George Clooney – Up in the Air	
2009	Best Actor	Jeremy Renner – The Hurt Locker	
2009	Best Actor in Supporting Role	Christoph Waltz – Inglourious Basterds (WON)	
2009	Best Actor in Supporting Role	Woody Harrelson – The Messenger	
2009	Best Actor in Supporting Role	Paul Schneider – Bright Star	
2009	Best Ensemble Cast	The Hurt Locker (WON)	
2009	Best Ensemble Cast	An Education	
2009	Best Ensemble Cast	Precious	
2009	Best Editing	Inglourious Basterds – Sally Menke (WON)	
2009	Best Editing	District 9 – Julian Clarke	
2009	Best Editing	Up in the Air – Dana E. Glauberman	
2009	Most Beautiful Film	Bright Star (WON)	
2009	Most Beautiful Film	The Lovely Bones	
2009	Most Beautiful Film	The Young Victoria	
2009	Best Non-English Language Film	Summer Hours – Olivier Assayas, France (WON)	
2009	Best Non-English Language Film	Broken Embraces – Pedro Almodóvar, Spain	
2009	Best Non-English Language Film	Sin Nombre – Cary Fukunaga, Mexico	
2010	Best Film	The Social Network (WON)	
2010	Best Film	Black Swan	
2010	Best Film	Inception	
2010	Best Film	The King's Speech	
2010	Best Film	Winter's Bone	
2010	Best Animated Film	Toy Story 3 (WON)	
2010	Best Animated Film	Despicable Me	
2010	Best Animated Film	How to Train Your Dragon	
2010	Best Animated Film	The Illusionist	
2010	Best Animated Film	Tangled	
2010	Best Director	David Fincher – The Social Network (WON)	
2010	Best Director	Darren Aronofsky – Black Swan	
2010	Best Director	Lisa Cholodenko – The Kids Are All Right	
2010	Best Director	Tom Hooper – The King's Speech	
2010	Best Director	Debra Granik – Winter's Bone	
2010	Best Director	Christopher Nolan – Inception	
2010	Best Screenplay, Original	The Kids Are All Right – Lisa Cholodenko and Stuart Blumberg (WON)	
2010	Best Screenplay, Original	Another Year – Mike Leigh	
2010	Best Screenplay, Original	Black Swan – Mark Heyman, Andres Heinz, and John J. McLaughlin	
2010	Best Screenplay, Original	Inception – Christopher Nolan	
2010	Best Screenplay, Original	The King's Speech – David Seidler	
2010	Best Screenplay, Adapted	The Social Network – Aaron Sorkin (WON)	
2010	Best Screenplay, Adapted	127 Hours – Danny Boyle and Simon Beaufoy	
2010	Best Screenplay, Adapted	Rabbit Hole – David Lindsay-Abaire	
2010	Best Screenplay, Adapted	True Grit – Joel Coen and Ethan Coen	
2010	Best Screenplay, Adapted	Winter's Bone – Debra Granik and Anne Rosellini	
2010	Best Documentary	Inside Job – Charles Ferguson (WON)	
2010	Best Documentary	Exit Through the Gift Shop – Banksy	
2010	Best Documentary	Joan Rivers: A Piece of Work – Ricki Stern and Anne Sundberg	
2010	Best Documentary	Restrepo – Tim Hetherington and Sebastian Junger	
2010	Best Documentary	The Tillman Story – Amir Bar-Lev	
2010	Best Documentary	Waiting for "Superman" – Davis Guggenheim	
2010	Best Actress	Annette Bening – The Kids Are All Right (WON)	
2010	Best Actress	Nicole Kidman – Rabbit Hole	
2010	Best Actress	Jennifer Lawrence – Winter's Bone	
2010	Best Actress	Lesley Manville – Another Year	
2010	Best Actress	Natalie Portman – Black Swan	
2010	Best Actress	Michelle Williams – Blue Valentine	
2010	Best Actress in Supporting Role	Hailee Steinfeld – True Grit (WON)	
2010	Best Actress in Supporting Role	Amy Adams – The Fighter	
2010	Best Actress in Supporting Role	Helena Bonham Carter – The King's Speech	
2010	Best Actress in Supporting Role	Melissa Leo – The Fighter	
2010	Best Actress in Supporting Role	Jacki Weaver – Animal Kingdom	
2010	Best Actor	Colin Firth – The King's Speech (WON)	
2010	Best Actor	Javier Bardem – Biutiful	
2010	Best Actor	Jeff Bridges – True Grit	
2010	Best Actor	Jesse Eisenberg – The Social Network	
2010	Best Actor	James Franco – 127 Hours	
2010	Best Actor in Supporting Role	Christian Bale – The Fighter (WON)	
2010	Best Actor in Supporting Role	Matt Damon – True Grit	
2010	Best Actor in Supporting Role	John Hawkes – Winter's Bone	
2010	Best Actor in Supporting Role	Mark Ruffalo – The Kids Are All Right	
2010	Best Actor in Supporting Role	Geoffrey Rush – The King's Speech	
2010	Best Ensemble Cast	The Kids Are All Right (WON)	
2010	Best Ensemble Cast	The Fighter	
2010	Best Ensemble Cast	The King's Speech	
2010	Best Ensemble Cast	The Social Network	
2010	Best Ensemble Cast	Winter's Bone	
2010	Best Editing	Black Swan – Andrew Weisblum (WON) (TIE)	
2010	Best Editing	Inception – Lee Smith (WON) (TIE)	
2010	Best Editing	127 Hours – Jon Harris	
2010	Best Editing	Shutter Island – Thelma Schoonmaker	
2010	Best Editing	The Social Network – Kirk Baxter and Angus Wall	
2010	Most Beautiful Film	I Am Love (WON)	
2010	Most Beautiful Film	Black Swan	
2010	Most Beautiful Film	Inception	
2010	Most Beautiful Film	Never Let Me Go	
2010	Most Beautiful Film	True Grit	
2010	Best Cinematography	Black Swan – Matthew Libatique (WON)	
2010	Best Cinematography	Inception – Wally Pfister	
2010	Best Cinematography	The Social Network – Jeff Cronenweth	
2010	Best Cinematography	True Grit – Roger Deakins	
2010	Best Cinematography	Winter's Bone – Michael McDonough	
2010	Best Music or Score	The Social Network – Trent Reznor and Atticus Ross (WON)	
2010	Best Music or Score	127 Hours – A. R. Rahman	
2010	Best Music or Score	Black Swan – Clint Mansell	
2010	Best Music or Score	Inception – Hans Zimmer	
2010	Best Music or Score	True Grit – Carter Burwell	
2010	Best Non-English Language Film	The Girl with the Dragon Tattoo (2009) – Niels Arden Oplev, Denmark (WON)	
2010	Best Non-English Language Film	Applause – Martin Zandvliet, Denmark	
2010	Best Non-English Language Film	Biutiful – Alejandro González Iñárritu, Mexico/Spain	
2010	Best Non-English Language Film	I Am Love – Luca Guadagnino, Italy	
2010	Best Non-English Language Film	Un prophète – Jacques Audiard, France/Italy	
2011	Best Film	The Artist (WON)	
2011	Best Film	The Descendants	
2011	Best Film	Hugo	
2011	Best Film	Melancholia	
2011	Best Film	Midnight in Paris	
2011	Best Director	Michel Hazanavicius – The Artist (WON)	
2011	Best Director	Woody Allen – Midnight in Paris	
2011	Best Director	Terrence Malick – The Tree of Life	
2011	Best Director	Alexander Payne – The Descendants	
2011	Best Director	Martin Scorsese – Hugo	
2011	Best Screenplay, Original	Midnight in Paris – Woody Allen (WON)	
2011	Best Screenplay, Original	The Artist – Michel Hazanavicius	
2011	Best Screenplay, Original	Beginners – Mike Mills	
2011	Best Screenplay, Original	Bridesmaids – Kristen Wiig and Annie Mumolo	
2011	Best Screenplay, Original	Win Win – Tom McCarthy	
2011	Best Screenplay, Adapted	The Descendants – Alexander Payne, Nat Faxon, and Jim Rash (WON) (TIE)	
2011	Best Screenplay, Adapted	Moneyball – Steven Zaillian and Aaron Sorkin (WON) (TIE)	
2011	Best Screenplay, Adapted	Hugo – John Logan	
2011	Best Screenplay, Adapted	Tinker Tailor Soldier Spy – Bridget O'Connor and Peter Straughan	
2011	Best Screenplay, Adapted	We Need to Talk About Kevin – Lynne Ramsay and Rory Stewart Kinnear	
2011	Best Documentary	Buck (WON)	
2011	Best Documentary	Bill Cunningham New York	
2011	Best Documentary	Cave of Forgotten Dreams	
2011	Best Documentary	The Interrupters	
2011	Best Documentary	Pina	
2011	Best Documentary	Project Nim	
2011	Best Animated Film	Rango (WON)	
2011	Best Animated Film	Arthur Christmas	
2011	Best Animated Film	Kung Fu Panda 2	
2011	Best Animated Film	Puss in Boots	
2011	Best Animated Film	The Adventures of Tintin	
2011	Best Actress	Viola Davis – The Help (WON)	
2011	Best Actress	Kirsten Dunst – Melancholia	
2011	Best Actress	Meryl Streep – The Iron Lady	
2011	Best Actress	Tilda Swinton – We Need To Talk About Kevin	
2011	Best Actress	Michelle Williams – My Week With Marilyn	
2011	Best Actress in Supporting Role	Janet McTeer – Albert Nobbs (WON) (TIE)	
2011	Best Actress in Supporting Role	Octavia Spencer – The Help (WON) (TIE)	
2011	Best Actress in Supporting Role	Bérénice Bejo – The Artist	
2011	Best Actress in Supporting Role	Jessica Chastain – The Help	
2011	Best Actress in Supporting Role	Carey Mulligan – Shame	
2011	Best Actor	Michael Fassbender – Shame (WON)	
2011	Best Actor	George Clooney – The Descendants	
2011	Best Actor	Jean Dujardin – The Artist	
2011	Best Actor	Brad Pitt – Moneyball	
2011	Best Actor	Michael Shannon – Take Shelter	
2011	Best Actor in Supporting Role	Christopher Plummer – Beginners (WON)	
2011	Best Actor in Supporting Role	Kenneth Brannagh – My Week with Marilyn	
2011	Best Actor in Supporting Role	Albert Brooks – Drive	
2011	Best Actor in Supporting Role	Alan Rickman – Harry Potter and the Deathly Hallows – Part 2	
2011	Best Actor in Supporting Role	Andy Serkis – Rise of the Planet of the Apes	
2011	Best Ensemble Cast	Bridesmaids (WON)	
2011	Best Ensemble Cast	The Descendants	
2011	Best Ensemble Cast	The Help	
2011	Best Ensemble Cast	Margin Call	
2011	Best Ensemble Cast	Midnight in Paris	
2011	Best Editing	Hugo – Thelma Schoonmaker (WON)	
2011	Best Editing	The Artist – Anne-Sophie Bion and Michel Hazanavicius	
2011	Best Editing	The Girl with the Dragon Tattoo (2011) – Kirk Baxter and Angus Wall	
2011	Best Editing	The Tree of Life – Hank Corwin, Jay Rabinowitz, Daniel Rezende, Billy Weber, Mark Yoshikawa	
2011	Best Editing	War Horse – Michael Kahn	
2011	Best Cinematography	The Tree of Life – Emmanuel Lubezki (WON)	
2011	Best Cinematography	The Artist – Guillaume Schiffman	
2011	Best Cinematography	Hugo – Robert Richardson	
2011	Best Cinematography	Melancholia – Manuel Alberto Claro	
2011	Best Cinematography	War Horse – Janusz Kamiński	
2011	Best Film Music or Score	Girl With The Dragon Tattoo (2011) – Trent Reznor and Atticus Ross (WON) (TIE)	
2011	Best Film Music or Score	Hanna – The Chemical Brothers (WON) (TIE)	
2011	Best Film Music or Score	The Artist – Ludovic Bource	
2011	Best Non-English Language Film	A Separation – Asghar Farhadi, Iran (WON)	
2011	Best Non-English Language Film	Le Havre – Aki Kaurismäki, Finland/France	
2011	Best Non-English Language Film	Pina – Wim Wenders, Germany	
2011	Best Non-English Language Film	The Skin I Live In – Pedro Almodóvar, Spain	
2011	Best Non-English Language Film	Trollhunter – André Øvredal, Norway	
2012	Best Film	Zero Dark Thirty (WON)	
2012	Best Film	Argo	
2012	Best Film	Lincoln	
2012	Best Director	Kathryn Bigelow – Zero Dark Thirty (WON)	
2012	Best Director	Ben Affleck – Argo	
2012	Best Director	Steven Spielberg – Lincoln	
2012	Best Screenplay, Original	Zero Dark Thirty – Mark Boal (WON)	
2012	Best Screenplay, Original	Amour – Michael Haneke	
2012	Best Screenplay, Original	Moonrise Kingdom – Wes Anderson and Roman Coppola	
2012	Best Screenplay, Adapted	Argo – Chris Terrio (WON)	
2012	Best Screenplay, Adapted	Lincoln – Tony Kushner	
2012	Best Screenplay, Adapted	Silver Linings Playbook – David O. Russell	
2012	Best Documentary	Searching for Sugar Man – Malik Bendjelloul (WON)	
2012	Best Documentary	The Gatekeepers – Dror Moreh	
2012	Best Documentary	The Imposter – Bart Layton	
2012	Best Documentary	The Invisible War – Kirby Dick	
2012	Best Animated Film	ParaNorman (WON)	
2012	Best Animated Film	Brave	
2012	Best Animated Film	Frankenweenie	
2012	Best Actress	Jessica Chastain – Zero Dark Thirty (WON)	
2012	Best Actress	Jennifer Lawrence – Silver Linings Playbook	
2012	Best Actress	Emmanuelle Riva – Amour	
2012	Best Actress in Supporting Role	Anne Hathaway – Les Misérables (WON)	
2012	Best Actress in Supporting Role	Amy Adams – The Master	
2012	Best Actress in Supporting Role	Sally Field – Lincoln	
2012	Best Actor	Daniel Day-Lewis – Lincoln (WON)	
2012	Best Actor	John Hawkes – The Sessions	
2012	Best Actor	Joaquin Phoenix – The Master	
2012	Best Actor in Supporting Role	Philip Seymour Hoffman – The Master (WON)	
2012	Best Actor in Supporting Role	Alan Arkin – Argo	
2012	Best Actor in Supporting Role	Tommy Lee Jones – Lincoln	
2012	Best Actor in Supporting Role	Christoph Waltz – Django Unchained	
2012	Best Ensemble Cast	Silver Linings Playbook (WON)	
2012	Best Ensemble Cast	Argo	
2012	Best Ensemble Cast	Lincoln	
2012	Best Editing	Zero Dark Thirty – William Goldenberg and Dylan Tichenor (WON)	
2012	Best Editing	Argo – William Goldenberg	
2012	Best Editing	Cloud Atlas – Alexander Berner	
2012	Best Cinematography	Life of Pi – Claudio Miranda (WON)	
2012	Best Cinematography	The Master – Mihai Mălaimare Jr.	
2012	Best Cinematography	Skyfall – Roger Deakins	
2012	Best Film Music or Score	Beasts of the Southern Wild – Dan Romer and Benh Zeitlin (WON)	
2012	Best Film Music or Score	Argo – Alexandre Desplat	
2012	Best Film Music or Score	Zero Dark Thirty – Alexandre Desplat	
2012	Best Non-English Language Film	Amour (WON)	
2012	Best Non-English Language Film	A Royal Affair	
2012	Best Non-English Language Film	Rust and Bone	
2013	Best Film	12 Years a Slave (WON)	
2013	Best Film	American Hustle	
2013	Best Film	Gravity	
2013	Best Film	Her	
2013	Best Film	Inside Llewyn Davis	
2013	Best Film	Nebraska	
2013	Best Director	Steve McQueen – 12 Years a Slave (WON)	
2013	Best Director	Joel Coen and Ethan Coen – Inside Llewyn Davis	
2013	Best Director	Alfonso Cuarón – Gravity	
2013	Best Director	Spike Jonze – Her	
2013	Best Director	Alexander Payne – Nebraska	
2013	Best Director	David O. Russell – American Hustle	
2013	Best Screenplay, Original	Her – Spike Jonze (WON)	
2013	Best Screenplay, Original	American Hustle – Eric Singer and David O. Russell	
2013	Best Screenplay, Original	Enough Said – Nicole Holofcener	
2013	Best Screenplay, Original	Inside Llewyn Davis – Joel Coen and Ethan Coen	
2013	Best Screenplay, Original	Nebraska – Bob Nelson	
2013	Best Screenplay, Adapted	12 Years a Slave – John Ridley (WON)	
2013	Best Screenplay, Adapted	Philomena – Steve Coogan and Jeff Pope	
2013	Best Screenplay, Adapted	Short Term 12 – Daniel Cretton	
2013	Best Screenplay, Adapted	The Spectacular Now – Scott Neustadter and Michael H. Weber	
2013	Best Screenplay, Adapted	Captain Phillips – Billy Ray	
2013	Best Documentary	Stories We Tell – Sarah Polley (WON)	
2013	Best Documentary	The Act of Killing – Joshua Oppenheimer	
2013	Best Documentary	After Tiller – Martha Shane and Lana Wilson	
2013	Best Documentary	20 Feet from Stardom – Morgan Neville	
2013	Best Documentary	Blackfish – Gabriela Cowperthwaite	
2013	Best Animated Film	The Wind Rises – Hayao Miyazaki (WON)	
2013	Best Animated Film	The Croods – Kirk DeMicco and Chris Sanders	
2013	Best Animated Film	Despicable Me 2 – Pierre Coffin and Chris Renaud	
2013	Best Animated Film	Frozen – Jennifer Lee and Chris Buck	
2013	Best Actress	Cate Blanchett – Blue Jasmine (WON)	
2013	Best Actress	Sandra Bullock – Gravity	
2013	Best Actress	Judi Dench – Philomena	
2013	Best Actress	Brie Larson – Short Term 12	
2013	Best Actress	Emma Thompson – Saving Mr. Banks	
2013	Best Actress in Supporting Role	Lupita Nyong'o – 12 Years a Slave (WON)	
2013	Best Actress in Supporting Role	Sally Hawkins – Blue Jasmine	
2013	Best Actress in Supporting Role	Scarlett Johansson – Her	
2013	Best Actress in Supporting Role	Jennifer Lawrence – American Hustle	
2013	Best Actress in Supporting Role	Oprah Winfrey – Lee Daniels' The Butler	
2013	Best Actor	Matthew McConaughey – Dallas Buyers Club (WON)	
2013	Best Actor	Bruce Dern – Nebraska	
2013	Best Actor	Chiwetel Ejiofor – 12 Years a Slave	
2013	Best Actor	Oscar Isaac – Inside Llewyn Davis	
2013	Best Actor	Joaquin Phoenix – Her	
2013	Best Actor	Robert Redford – All Is Lost	
2013	Best Actor in Supporting Role	Jared Leto – Dallas Buyers Club (WON)	
2013	Best Actor in Supporting Role	Barkhad Abdi – Captain Phillips	
2013	Best Actor in Supporting Role	Bobby Cannavale – Blue Jasmine	
2013	Best Actor in Supporting Role	Michael Fassbender – 12 Years a Slave	
2013	Best Actor in Supporting Role	Will Forte – Nebraska	
2013	Best Ensemble Cast	American Hustle (WON)	
2013	Best Ensemble Cast	12 Years a Slave	
2013	Best Ensemble Cast	August: Osage County	
2013	Best Ensemble Cast	Lee Daniels' The Butler	
2013	Best Ensemble Cast	Nebraska	
2013	Best Editing	Gravity – Alfonso Cuarón and Mark Sanger (WON)	
2013	Best Editing	12 Years a Slave – Joe Walker	
2013	Best Editing	American Hustle – Alan Baumgarten, Jay Cassidy, and Crispin Struthers	
2013	Best Editing	Captain Phillips – Christopher Rouse	
2013	Best Editing	Rush – Daniel P. Hanley	
2013	Best Cinematography	Gravity – Emmanuel Lubezki (WON)	
2013	Best Cinematography	12 Years a Slave – Sean Bobbitt	
2013	Best Cinematography	All Is Lost – Frank G. DeMarco and Peter Zuccarini	
2013	Best Cinematography	Nebraska – Phedon Papamichael	
2013	Best Cinematography	Prisoners – Roger Deakins	
2013	Best Film Music or Score	Inside Llewyn Davis – T Bone Burnett (WON)	
2013	Best Film Music or Score	12 Years a Slave – Hans Zimmer	
2013	Best Film Music or Score	Gravity – Steven Price	
2013	Best Film Music or Score	Her – Arcade Fire	
2013	Best Film Music or Score	Nebraska – Mark Orton	
2013	Best Non-English Language Film	The Hunt – Thomas Vinterberg, Denmark (WON)	
2013	Best Non-English Language Film	Blue Is the Warmest Colour – Abdellatif Kechiche, France	
2013	Best Non-English Language Film	The Grandmaster – Wong Kar-wai, Hong Kong	
2013	Best Non-English Language Film	The Past – Asghar Farhadi, Iran	
2013	Best Non-English Language Film	Wadjda – Haifaa Al-Mansour, Saudi Arabia	
2014	Best Film	Boyhood (WON)	
2014	Best Film	Birdman	
2014	Best Film	The Grand Budapest Hotel	
2014	Best Film	Only Lovers Left Alive	
2014	Best Film	Selma	
2014	Best Director	Richard Linklater – Boyhood (WON)	
2014	Best Director	Wes Anderson – The Grand Budapest Hotel	
2014	Best Director	Ava DuVernay – Selma	
2014	Best Director	Alejandro G. Iñárritu – Birdman	
2014	Best Director	Jim Jarmusch – Only Lovers Left Alive	
2014	Best Screenplay, Original	Birdman – Alejandro G. Iñárritu, Nicolás Giacobone, Alexander Dinelaris Jr., and Armando Bó (WON)	
2014	Best Screenplay, Original	Boyhood – Richard Linklater	
2014	Best Screenplay, Original	The Grand Budapest Hotel – Wes Anderson	
2014	Best Screenplay, Adapted	Gone Girl – Gillian Flynn (WON)	
2014	Best Screenplay, Adapted	Inherent Vice – Paul Thomas Anderson	
2014	Best Screenplay, Adapted	Wild – Nick Hornby and Cheryl Strayed	
2014	Best Documentary	Citizenfour – Laura Poitras (WON)	
2014	Best Documentary	Jodorowsky's Dune – Frank Pavich	
2014	Best Documentary	Life Itself – Steve James	
2014	Best Animated Film	The Lego Movie – Phil Lord and Christopher Miller (WON)	
2014	Best Animated Film	Big Hero 6 – Don Hall and Chris Williams	
2014	Best Animated Film	The Tale of the Princess Kaguya – Isao Takahata	
2014	Best Actress	Julianne Moore – Still Alice (WON)	
2014	Best Actress	Marion Cotillard – Two Days, One Night	
2014	Best Actress	Rosamund Pike – Gone Girl	
2014	Best Actress in Supporting Role	Tilda Swinton – Snowpiercer (WON)	
2014	Best Actress in Supporting Role	Patricia Arquette – Boyhood	
2014	Best Actress in Supporting Role	Emma Stone – Birdman	
2014	Best Actor	Michael Keaton – Birdman (WON)	
2014	Best Actor	Jake Gyllenhaal – Nightcrawler	
2014	Best Actor	Eddie Redmayne – The Theory of Everything	
2014	Best Actor in Supporting Role	J. K. Simmons – Whiplash (WON)	
2014	Best Actor in Supporting Role	Edward Norton – Birdman	
2014	Best Actor in Supporting Role	Mark Ruffalo – Foxcatcher	
2014	Best Ensemble Cast	Birdman (WON) (TIE)	
2014	Best Ensemble Cast	The Grand Budapest Hotel (WON) (TIE)	
2014	Best Ensemble Cast	Boyhood	
2014	Best Editing	Birdman – Douglas Crise and Stephen Mirrione (WON)	
2014	Best Editing	Boyhood – Sandra Adair	
2014	Best Editing	Whiplash – Tom Cross	
2014	Best Cinematography	Birdman – Emmanuel Lubezki (WON)	
2014	Best Cinematography	Interstellar – Hoyte van Hoytema	
2014	Best Cinematography	Mr. Turner – Dick Pope	
2014	Best Film Music or Score	Birdman – Antonio Sánchez (WON)	
2014	Best Film Music or Score	Gone Girl – Trent Reznor and Atticus Ross	
2014	Best Film Music or Score	The Grand Budapest Hotel – Alexandre Desplat	
2014	Best Non-English Language Film	Ida – Paweł Pawlikowski, Poland (WON)	
2014	Best Non-English Language Film	Force Majeure – Ruben Östlund, Sweden	
2014	Best Non-English Language Film	Two Days, One Night – Jean-Pierre Dardennes and Luc Dardennes, Belgium	
2015	Best Film	Spotlight (WON)	
2015	Best Film	Carol	
2015	Best Film	Mad Max: Fury Road	
2015	Best Film	The Martian	
2015	Best Film	Room	
2015	Best Director	Tom McCarthy – Spotlight (WON)	
2015	Best Director	Lenny Abrahamson – Room	
2015	Best Director	Todd Haynes – Carol	
2015	Best Director	Alejandro G. Iñárritu – The Revenant	
2015	Best Director	George Miller – Mad Max: Fury Road	
2015	Best Director	Ridley Scott – The Martian	
2015	Best Screenplay, Original	Spotlight – Josh Singer and Tom McCarthy (WON)	
2015	Best Screenplay, Original	Ex Machina – Alex Garland	
2015	Best Screenplay, Original	Inside Out – Pete Docter, Ronnie Del Carmen, Meg LeFauve, and Josh Cooley	
2015	Best Screenplay, Adapted	Carol – Phyllis Nagy (WON)	
2015	Best Screenplay, Adapted	The Big Short – Charles Randolph and Adam McKay	
2015	Best Screenplay, Adapted	The Martian – Drew Goddard	
2015	Best Screenplay, Adapted	Room – Emma Donoghue	
2015	Best Documentary	Amy – Asif Kapadia (WON)	
2015	Best Documentary	Best of Enemies – Robert Gordon and Morgan Neville	
2015	Best Documentary	Going Clear: Scientology and The Prison of Belief – Alex Gibney	
2015	Best Documentary	The Hunting Ground – Kirby Dick	
2015	Best Documentary	What Happened, Miss Simone? – Liz Garbus	
2015	Best Animated Film	Inside Out (WON)	
2015	Best Animated Film	Anomalisa	
2015	Best Animated Film	Shaun the Sheep	
2015	Best Actress	Charlotte Rampling – 45 Years (WON)	
2015	Best Actress	Cate Blanchett – Carol	
2015	Best Actress	Brie Larson – Room	
2015	Best Actress in Supporting Role	Kristen Stewart – Clouds of Sils Maria (WON)	
2015	Best Actress in Supporting Role	Rooney Mara – Carol	
2015	Best Actress in Supporting Role	Alicia Vikander – Ex Machina	
2015	Best Actress in Supporting Role	Kate Winslet – Steve Jobs	
2015	Best Actor	Leonardo DiCaprio – The Revenant (WON)	
2015	Best Actor	Matt Damon – The Martian	
2015	Best Actor	Michael Fassbender – Steve Jobs	
2015	Best Actor	Eddie Redmayne – The Danish Girl	
2015	Best Actor in Supporting Role	Paul Dano – Love & Mercy (WON)	
2015	Best Actor in Supporting Role	Mark Rylance – Bridge of Spies	
2015	Best Actor in Supporting Role	Michael Shannon – 99 Homes	
2015	Best Actor in Supporting Role	Sylvester Stallone – Creed	
2015	Best Ensemble Cast	Spotlight (WON) (TIE)	
2015	Best Ensemble Cast	Straight Outta Compton (WON) (TIE)	
2015	Best Ensemble Cast	The Big Short	
2015	Best Editing	Mad Max: Fury Road – Margaret Sixel (WON)	
2015	Best Editing	The Big Short – Hank Corwin	
2015	Best Editing	Spotlight – Tom McArdle	
2015	Best Cinematography	Carol – Edward Lachman (WON)	
2015	Best Cinematography	Mad Max: Fury Road – John Seale	
2015	Best Cinematography	The Revenant – Emmanuel Lubezki	
2015	Best Film Music or Score	The Hateful Eight – Ennio Morricone (WON)	
2015	Best Film Music or Score	Carol – Carter Burwell	
2015	Best Film Music or Score	Mad Max: Fury Road – Junkie XL	
2015	Best Film Music or Score	Youth – David Lang	
2015	Best Non-English Language Film	Son of Saul – László Nemes, Hungary (WON)	
2015	Best Non-English Language Film	Mustang – Deniz Gamze Ergüven	
2015	Best Non-English Language Film	Phoenix – Christian Petzold	
2016	Best Film	Moonlight (WON)	
2016	Best Film	Arrival	
2016	Best Film	Hell or High Water	
2016	Best Film	La La Land	
2016	Best Film	Manchester by the Sea	
2016	Best Director	Barry Jenkins – Moonlight (WON)	
2016	Best Director	Damien Chazelle – La La Land	
2016	Best Director	Kenneth Lonergan – Manchester by the Sea	
2016	Best Director	David Mackenzie – Hell or High Water	
2016	Best Director	Denis Villeneuve – Arrival	
2016	Best Screenplay, Original	Manchester by the Sea – Kenneth Lonergan (WON)	
2016	Best Screenplay, Original	20th Century Women – Mike Mills	
2016	Best Screenplay, Original	Hail, Caesar! – Joel Coen and Ethan Coen	
2016	Best Screenplay, Original	Hell or High Water – Taylor Sheridan	
2016	Best Screenplay, Original	La La Land – Damien Chazelle	
2016	Best Screenplay, Adapted	Moonlight – Barry Jenkins (WON)	
2016	Best Screenplay, Adapted	Arrival – Eric Heisserer	
2016	Best Screenplay, Adapted	Lion – Luke Davies	
2016	Best Screenplay, Adapted	Love & Friendship – Whit Stillman	
2016	Best Screenplay, Adapted	Nocturnal Animals – Tom Ford	
2016	Best Documentary	13th – Ava DuVernay (WON)	
2016	Best Documentary	Gleason – Clay Tweel	
2016	Best Documentary	I Am Not Your Negro – Raoul Peck	
2016	Best Documentary	O.J.: Made in America – Ezra Edelman	
2016	Best Documentary	Weiner – Elyse Steinberg and Josh Kriegman	
2016	Best Animated Film	Zootopia – Byron Howard, Rich Moore, and Jared Bush (WON)	
2016	Best Animated Film	Finding Dory – Andrew Stanton and Angus MacLane	
2016	Best Animated Film	Kubo and the Two Strings – Travis Knight	
2016	Best Animated Film	Moana – Ron Clements, Don Hall, John Musker, and Chris Williams	
2016	Best Actress	Ruth Negga – Loving (WON)	
2016	Best Actress	Amy Adams – Arrival	
2016	Best Actress	Isabelle Huppert – Elle	
2016	Best Actress	Natalie Portman – Jackie	
2016	Best Actress	Emma Stone – La La Land	
2016	Best Actress in Supporting Role	Viola Davis – Fences (WON)	
2016	Best Actress in Supporting Role	Greta Gerwig – 20th Century Women	
2016	Best Actress in Supporting Role	Naomie Harris – Moonlight	
2016	Best Actress in Supporting Role	Octavia Spencer – Hidden Figures	
2016	Best Actress in Supporting Role	Michelle Williams – Manchester by the Sea	
2016	Best Actor	Casey Affleck – Manchester by the Sea (WON)	
2016	Best Actor	Joel Edgerton – Loving	
2016	Best Actor	Ryan Gosling – La La Land	
2016	Best Actor	Tom Hanks – Sully	
2016	Best Actor	Denzel Washington – Fences	
2016	Best Actor in Supporting Role	Mahershala Ali – Moonlight (WON)	
2016	Best Actor in Supporting Role	Jeff Bridges – Hell or High Water	
2016	Best Actor in Supporting Role	Ben Foster – Hell or High Water	
2016	Best Actor in Supporting Role	Lucas Hedges – Manchester by the Sea	
2016	Best Actor in Supporting Role	Michael Shannon – Nocturnal Animals	
2016	Best Ensemble Cast – Casting Director	Moonlight – Yesi Ramirez (WON)	
2016	Best Ensemble Cast – Casting Director	20th Century Women – Mark Bennett and Laura Rosenthal	
2016	Best Ensemble Cast – Casting Director	Hail, Caesar! – Ellen Chenoweth	
2016	Best Ensemble Cast – Casting Director	Hell or High Water – Jo Edna Boldin and Richard Hicks	
2016	Best Ensemble Cast – Casting Director	Manchester by the Sea – Douglas Aibel	
2016	Best Cinematography	Moonlight – James Laxton (WON)	
2016	Best Cinematography	Arrival – Bradford Young	
2016	Best Cinematography	Hell or High Water – Giles Nuttgens	
2016	Best Cinematography	La La Land – Linus Sandgren	
2016	Best Cinematography	Manchester by the Sea – Jody Lee Lipes	
2016	Best Editing	Moonlight – Joi McMillon and Nat Sanders (WON)	
2016	Best Editing	Arrival – Joe Walker	
2016	Best Editing	I Am Not Your Negro – Alexandra Strauss	
2016	Best Editing	La La Land – Tom Cross	
2016	Best Editing	Manchester by the Sea – Jennifer Lame	
2016	Best Non-English Language Film	The Handmaiden – Park Chan-wook, South Korea (WON)	
2016	Best Non-English Language Film	Elle – Paul Verhoeven, France	
2016	Best Non-English Language Film	Fire at Sea – Gianfranco Rosi, Italy	
2016	Best Non-English Language Film	Julieta – Pedro Almodóvar, Spain	
2016	Best Non-English Language Film	Toni Erdmann – Maren Ade, Germany	
2017	Best Film	The Shape of Water (WON)	
2017	Best Film	Call Me by Your Name	
2017	Best Film	Get Out	
2017	Best Film	Lady Bird	
2017	Best Film	Three Billboards Outside Ebbing, Missouri	
2017	Best Director	Guillermo del Toro – The Shape of Water (WON)	
2017	Best Director	Greta Gerwig – Lady Bird	
2017	Best Director	Martin McDonagh – Three Billboards Outside Ebbing, Missouri	
2017	Best Director	Christopher Nolan – Dunkirk	
2017	Best Director	Jordan Peele – Get Out	
2017	Best Screenplay, Original	Get Out – Jordan Peele (WON)	
2017	Best Screenplay, Original	Lady Bird – Greta Gerwig	
2017	Best Screenplay, Original	Three Billboards Outside Ebbing, Missouri – Martin McDonagh	
2017	Best Screenplay, Adapted	Call Me by Your Name – James Ivory (WON)	
2017	Best Screenplay, Adapted	Molly's Game – Aaron Sorkin	
2017	Best Screenplay, Adapted	Mudbound – Dee Rees and Virgil Williams	
2017	Best Documentary	Faces Places – Agnès Varda and JR (WON)	
2017	Best Documentary	Dawson City: Frozen Time – Bill Morrison	
2017	Best Documentary	Jane – Brett Morgen	
2017	Best Documentary	Kedi – Ceyda Torun	
2017	Best Documentary	STEP – Amanda Lipitz	
2017	Best Animated Film	Coco – Lee Unkrich (WON) (TIE)	
2017	Best Animated Film	Loving Vincent – Dorota Kobiela and Hugh Welchman (WON) (TIE)	
2017	Best Animated Film	The Breadwinner – Nora Twomey	
2017	Best Actress	Frances McDormand – Three Billboards Outside Ebbing, Missouri (WON)	
2017	Best Actress	Sally Hawkins – The Shape of Water	
2017	Best Actress	Margot Robbie – I, Tonya	
2017	Best Actress in Supporting Role	Laurie Metcalf – Lady Bird (WON)	
2017	Best Actress in Supporting Role	Mary J. Blige – Mudbound	
2017	Best Actress in Supporting Role	Allison Janney – I, Tonya	
2017	Best Actor	Gary Oldman – Darkest Hour (WON)	
2017	Best Actor	Timothée Chalamet – Call Me by Your Name	
2017	Best Actor	Daniel Kaluuya – Get Out	
2017	Best Actor in Supporting Role	Willem Dafoe – The Florida Project (WON)	
2017	Best Actor in Supporting Role	Sam Rockwell – Three Billboards Outside Ebbing, Missouri	
2017	Best Actor in Supporting Role	Michael Stuhlbarg – Call Me by Your Name	
2017	Best Ensemble Cast – Casting Director	Mudbound – Billy Hopkins and Ashley Ingram (WON)	
2017	Best Ensemble Cast – Casting Director	The Post – Ellen Lewis	
2017	Best Ensemble Cast – Casting Director	Three Billboards Outside Ebbing, Missouri – Sara Finn	
2017	Best Cinematography	Blade Runner 2049 – Roger Deakins (WON)	
2017	Best Cinematography	Dunkirk – Hoyte van Hoytema	
2017	Best Cinematography	The Shape of Water – Dan Laustsen	
2017	Best Editing	Dunkirk – Lee Smith (WON)	
2017	Best Editing	Baby Driver – Jonathan Amos and Paul Machliss	
2017	Best Editing	The Shape of Water – Sidney Wolinsky	
2017	Best Non-English Language Film	The Square – Ruben Östlund, Sweden (WON)	
2017	Best Non-English Language Film	BPM (Beats per Minute) – Robin Campillo, France	
2017	Best Non-English Language Film	First They Killed My Father – Angelina Jolie, Vietnam	
2018	Best Film	Roma (WON)	
2018	Best Film	BlacKkKlansman	
2018	Best Film	The Favourite	
2018	Best Film	Green Book	
2018	Best Film	Leave No Trace	
2018	Best Film	Vice	
2018	Best Director	Alfonso Cuarón – Roma (WON)	
2018	Best Director	Debra Granik – Leave No Trace	
2018	Best Director	Yorgos Lanthimos – The Favourite	
2018	Best Director	Spike Lee – BlacKkKlansman	
2018	Best Director	Adam McKay – Vice	
2018	Best Screenplay, Original	The Favourite – Deborah Davis and Tony McNamara (WON)	
2018	Best Screenplay, Original	Eighth Grade – Bo Burnham	
2018	Best Screenplay, Original	First Reformed – Paul Schrader	
2018	Best Screenplay, Original	Roma – Alfonso Cuarón	
2018	Best Screenplay, Original	Vice – Adam McKay	
2018	Best Screenplay, Adapted	Can You Ever Forgive Me? – Nicole Holofcener and Jeff Whitty (WON)	
2018	Best Screenplay, Adapted	Black Panther – Ryan Coogler and Joe Robert Cole	
2018	Best Screenplay, Adapted	BlacKkKlansman – Charlie Wachtel, David Rabinowitz and Spike Lee	
2018	Best Screenplay, Adapted	The Hate U Give – Audrey Wells	
2018	Best Screenplay, Adapted	If Beale Street Could Talk – Barry Jenkins	
2018	Best Screenplay, Adapted	Leave No Trace – Debra Granik and Anne Rosellini	
2018	Best Documentary	Won't You Be My Neighbor? – Morgan Neville (WON)	
2018	Best Documentary	Free Solo – Elizabeth Chai Vasarhelyi and Jimmy Chin	
2018	Best Documentary	Liyana – Aaron Kopp and Amanda Kopp	
2018	Best Documentary	RBG – Betsy West and Julie Cohen	
2018	Best Documentary	Shirkers – Sandi Tan	
2018	Best Documentary	Three Identical Strangers – Tim Wardle	
2018	Best Animated Film	Spider-Man: Into the Spider-Verse – Bob Persichetti, Peter Ramsey and Rodney Rothman (WON)	
2018	Best Animated Film	Incredibles 2 – Brad Bird	
2018	Best Animated Film	Isle of Dogs – Wes Anderson	
2018	Best Animated Film	Mary and the Witch's Flower – Hiromasa Yonebayashi and Giles New	
2018	Best Animated Film	Ralph Breaks the Internet – Rich Moore and Phil Johnston	
2018	Best Animated Film	Smallfoot – Karey Kirkpatrick	
2018	Best Actress	Olivia Colman – The Favourite (WON)	
2018	Best Actress	Yalitza Aparicio – Roma	
2018	Best Actress	Glenn Close – The Wife	
2018	Best Actress	Viola Davis – Widows	
2018	Best Actress	Lady Gaga – A Star Is Born	
2018	Best Actress	Melissa McCarthy – Can You Ever Forgive Me?	
2018	Best Actress in Supporting Role	Regina King – If Beale Street Could Talk (WON)	
2018	Best Actress in Supporting Role	Amy Adams – Vice	
2018	Best Actress in Supporting Role	Claire Foy – First Man	
2018	Best Actress in Supporting Role	Thomasin McKenzie – Leave No Trace	
2018	Best Actress in Supporting Role	Emma Stone – The Favourite	
2018	Best Actress in Supporting Role	Rachel Weisz – The Favourite	
2018	Best Actor	Ethan Hawke – First Reformed (WON)	
2018	Best Actor	Christian Bale – Vice	
2018	Best Actor	Willem Dafoe – At Eternity's Gate	
2018	Best Actor	Ben Foster – Leave No Trace	
2018	Best Actor	Rami Malek – Bohemian Rhapsody	
2018	Best Actor	Viggo Mortensen – Green Book	
2018	Best Actor in Supporting Role	Richard E. Grant – Can You Ever Forgive Me? (WON)	
2018	Best Actor in Supporting Role	Mahershala Ali – Green Book	
2018	Best Actor in Supporting Role	Steve Carell – Vice	
2018	Best Actor in Supporting Role	Adam Driver – BlacKkKlansman	
2018	Best Actor in Supporting Role	Hugh Grant – Paddington 2	
2018	Best Actor in Supporting Role	Michael B. Jordan – Black Panther	
2018	Best Ensemble Cast – Casting Director	Black Panther – Sarah Finn (WON)	
2018	Best Ensemble Cast – Casting Director	BlacKkKlansman – Kim Coleman	
2018	Best Ensemble Cast – Casting Director	Crazy Rich Asians – Terry Taylor	
2018	Best Ensemble Cast – Casting Director	The Favourite – Dixie Chassay	
2018	Best Ensemble Cast – Casting Director	If Beale Street Could Talk – Cindy Tolan	
2018	Best Ensemble Cast – Casting Director	Vice –Francine Maisler	
2018	Best Cinematography	Roma – Alfonso Cuarón (WON)	
2018	Best Cinematography	Black Panther – Rachel Morrison	
2018	Best Cinematography	The Favourite – Robbie Ryan	
2018	Best Cinematography	First Man – Linus Sandgren	
2018	Best Cinematography	If Beale Street Could Talk – James Laxton	
2018	Best Editing	Roma – Alfonso Cuarón and Adam Gough (WON)	
2018	Best Editing	Black Panther – Debbie Berman and Michael Shawver	
2018	Best Editing	The Favourite – Yorgos Mavropsaridis	
2018	Best Editing	Vice – Hank Corwin	
2018	Best Editing	Widows – Joe Walker	
2018	Best Non-English Language Film	Roma – Alfonso Cuarón, Mexico, Spanish and Mixtec (WON)	
2018	Best Non-English Language Film	Burning – Lee Chang-dong, South Korea, Korean	
2018	Best Non-English Language Film	Capernaum – Nadine Labaki, Lebanon, Lebanese Arabic and Amharic	
2018	Best Non-English Language Film	Cold War – Paweł Pawlikowski, Poland, Polish	
2018	Best Non-English Language Film	Shoplifters – Hirokazu Kore-eda, Japan, Japanese	
2019	Best Film	Parasite (WON)	
2019	Best Film	The Irishman	
2019	Best Film	Jojo Rabbit	
2019	Best Film	Once Upon a Time in Hollywood	
2019	Best Film	Marriage Story	
2019	Best Director	Bong Joon-ho – Parasite (WON)	
2019	Best Director	Noah Baumbach – Marriage Story	
2019	Best Director	Martin Scorsese – The Irishman	
2019	Best Director	Quentin Tarantino – Once Upon a Time in Hollywood	
2019	Best Director	Céline Sciamma – Portrait of a Lady on Fire	
2019	Best Screenplay, Original	Parasite – Bong Joon-ho (WON)	
2019	Best Screenplay, Original	The Farewell – Lulu Wang	
2019	Best Screenplay, Original	Knives Out – Rian Johnson	
2019	Best Screenplay, Original	Marriage Story – Noah Baumbach	
2019	Best Screenplay, Original	Once Upon a Time in Hollywood – Quentin Tarantino	
2019	Best Screenplay, Adapted	Little Women – Greta Gerwig (WON)	
2019	Best Screenplay, Adapted	A Beautiful Day in the Neighborhood – Marielle Heller	
2019	Best Screenplay, Adapted	Hustlers – Lorene Scafaria	
2019	Best Screenplay, Adapted	Jojo Rabbit – Taika Waititi	
2019	Best Screenplay, Adapted	The Irishman – Steven Zaillian	
2019	Best Documentary	Apollo 11 (WON)	
2019	Best Documentary	For Sama	
2019	Best Documentary	Honeyland	
2019	Best Documentary	Maiden	
2019	Best Documentary	One Child Nation	
2019	Best Animated Film	I Lost My Body (WON)	
2019	Best Animated Film	Abominable	
2019	Best Animated Film	Frozen 2	
2019	Best Animated Film	Klaus	
2019	Best Animated Film	Toy Story 4	
2019	Best Actress	Lupita Nyong'o – Us (WON)	
2019	Best Actress	Awkwafina – The Farewell	
2019	Best Actress	Saoirse Ronan – Little Women	
2019	Best Actress	Scarlett Johansson – Marriage Story	
2019	Best Actress	Renée Zellweger – Judy	
2019	Best Actress in a Supporting Role	Florence Pugh – Little Women (WON)	
2019	Best Actress in a Supporting Role	Annette Bening – The Report	
2019	Best Actress in a Supporting Role	Laura Dern – Marriage Story	
2019	Best Actress in a Supporting Role	Jennifer Lopez – Hustlers	
2019	Best Actress in a Supporting Role	Zhao Shuzhen – The Farewell	
2019	Best Actor	Adam Driver – Marriage Story (WON)	
2019	Best Actor	Antonio Banderas – Pain and Glory	
2019	Best Actor	Eddie Murphy – Dolemite Is My Name	
2019	Best Actor	Joaquin Phoenix – Joker	
2019	Best Actor	Adam Sandler – Uncut Gems	
2019	Best Actor in Supporting Role	Brad Pitt – Once Upon a Time in Hollywood (WON)	
2019	Best Actor in Supporting Role	Willem Dafoe – The Lighthouse	
2019	Best Actor in Supporting Role	Tom Hanks – A Beautiful Day in the Neighborhood	
2019	Best Actor in Supporting Role	Al Pacino – The Irishman	
2019	Best Actor in Supporting Role	Joe Pesci – The Irishman	
2019	Best Ensemble Cast – Casting Director	Little Women – Kathy Driscoll and Francine Maisler (WON)	
2019	Best Ensemble Cast – Casting Director	The Irishman – Ellen Lewis	
2019	Best Ensemble Cast – Casting Director	Marriage Story – Douglas Maisel and Francine Maisler	
2019	Best Ensemble Cast – Casting Director	Once Upon a Time in Hollywood – Victoria Thomas	
2019	Best Ensemble Cast – Casting Director	Parasite –Francine Maisler	
2019	Best Cinematography	1917 – Roger Deakins (WON)	
2019	Best Cinematography	A Hidden Life – Jörg Widmer	
2019	Best Cinematography	The Lighthouse – Jarin Blaschke	
2019	Best Cinematography	Once Upon a Time in Hollywood – Robert Richardson	
2019	Best Cinematography	Portrait of a Lady on Fire – Claire Mathon	
2019	Best Editing	The Irishman – Thelma Schoonmaker (WON)	
2019	Best Editing	1917 – Lee Smith	
2019	Best Editing	Ford v Ferrari – Andrew Buckland et al.	
2019	Best Editing	Once Upon a Time in Hollywood – Fred Raskin	
2019	Best Editing	Parasite – Yang Jin-mo	
2019	Best Non-English Language Film	Parasite (WON)	
2019	Best Non-English Language Film	Atlantics	
2019	Best Non-English Language Film	Pain and Glory	
2019	Best Non-English Language Film	Portrait of a Lady on Fire	
2020	Best Film	Nomadland (WON)	
2020	Best Film	Minari	
2020	Best Film	Never Rarely Sometimes Always	
2020	Best Film	One Night in Miami...	
2020	Best Film	Promising Young Woman	
2020	Best Film	The Trial Of The Chicago 7	
2020	Best Director	Chloe Zhao – Nomadland (WON)	
2020	Best Director	Emerald Fennell – Promising Young Woman	
2020	Best Director	Regina King – One Night In Miami	
2020	Best Director	Kelly Reichardt – First Cow	
2020	Best Director	Aaron Sorkin – The Trial of The Chicago 7	
2020	Best Screenplay, Original	Promising Young Woman – Emerald Fennell (WON)	
2020	Best Screenplay, Original	Mank – Jack Fincher	
2020	Best Screenplay, Original	The Trial Of The Chicago 7 – Aaron Sorkin	
2020	Best Screenplay, Adapted	Nomadland – Chloe Zhao (WON)	
2020	Best Screenplay, Adapted	First Cow – Kelly Reichardt	
2020	Best Screenplay, Adapted	One Night In Miami – Kemp Powers	
2020	Best Documentary	All In: The Fight For Democracy (WON) (TIE)	
2020	Best Documentary	The Panther And The Thief (WON) (TIE)	
2020	Best Documentary	Athlete A	
2020	Best Documentary	Crip Camp	
2020	Best Documentary	Time	
2020	Best Animated Film	Soul (WON)	
2020	Best Animated Film	Over the Moon	
2020	Best Animated Film	Wolfwalkers	
2020	Best Actress	Frances McDormand – Nomadland (WON)	
2020	Best Actress	Viola Davis – Ma Rainey's Black Bottom	
2020	Best Actress	Vanessa Kirby – Pieces of a Woman	
2020	Best Actress	Carey Mulligan – Promising Young Woman	
2020	Best Actress in a Supporting Role	Youn Yuh-jung – Minari (WON)	
2020	Best Actress in a Supporting Role	Maria Bakalova – Borat Subsequent Moviefilm	
2020	Best Actress in a Supporting Role	Ellen Burstyn – Pieces of a Woman	
2020	Best Actress in a Supporting Role	Amanda Seyfried – Mank	
2020	Best Actor	Chadwick Boseman – Ma Rainey's Black Bottom (WON)	
2020	Best Actor	Riz Ahmed – Sound of Metal	
2020	Best Actor	Delroy Lindo – Da 5 Bloods	
2020	Best Actor in Supporting Role	Leslie Odom Jr. – One Night in Miami (WON)	
2020	Best Actor in Supporting Role	Bill Murray – On the Rocks	
2020	Best Actor in Supporting Role	Sacha Baron Cohen – The Trial of the Chicago 7	
2020	Best Ensemble Cast – Casting Director	One Night in Miami – Kimberly Hardin (WON) (TIE)	
2020	Best Ensemble Cast – Casting Director	The Trial of the Chicago 7 – Francine Maisler (WON) (TIE)	
2020	Best Ensemble Cast – Casting Director	Da 5 Bloods – Kim Coleman	
2020	Best Cinematography	Nomadland – Joshua James Richards (WON)	
2020	Best Cinematography	Mank – Erik Messerschmidt	
2020	Best Cinematography	One Night in Miami – Tami Reiker	
2020	Best Editing	Nomadland – Chloé Zhao (WON)	
2020	Best Editing	One Night in Miami – Tariq Anwar	
2020	Best Editing	The Trial of the Chicago 7 – Alan Baumgarten	
2020	Best Non-English Language Film	Another Round (WON)	
2020	Best Non-English Language Film	Beanpole	
2020	Best Non-English Language Film	The Mole Agent	
2020	Best Non-English Language Film	The Painted Bird	
2021	Best Film	The Power of the Dog (WON)	
2021	Best Film	Belfast	
2021	Best Film	Licorice Pizza	
2021	Best Film	The Lost Daughter	
2021	Best Film	Passing	
2021	Best Director	Jane Campion – The Power of the Dog (WON)	
2021	Best Director	Paul Thomas Anderson – Licorice Pizza	
2021	Best Director	Kenneth Branagh – Belfast	
2021	Best Director	Maggie Gyllenhaal – The Lost Daughter	
2021	Best Director	Rebecca Hall – Passing	
2021	Best Actress	Olivia Colman – The Lost Daughter (WON)	
2021	Best Actress	Jessica Chastain – The Eyes of Tammy Faye	
2021	Best Actress	Lady Gaga – House of Gucci	
2021	Best Actress	Kristen Stewart – Spencer	
2021	Best Actress	Tessa Thompson – Passing	
2021	Best Actress in a Supporting Role	Kirsten Dunst – The Power of the Dog (WON)	
2021	Best Actress in a Supporting Role	Jessie Buckley – The Lost Daughter	
2021	Best Actress in a Supporting Role	Ann Dowd – Mass	
2021	Best Actress in a Supporting Role	Aunjanue Ellis – King Richard	
2021	Best Actress in a Supporting Role	Ruth Negga – Passing	
2021	Best Actor	Benedict Cumberbatch – The Power of the Dog (WON)	
2021	Best Actor	Peter Dinklage – Cyrano	
2021	Best Actor	Andrew Garfield – tick, tick... BOOM!	
2021	Best Actor	Will Smith – King Richard	
2021	Best Actor	Denzel Washington – The Tragedy of Macbeth	
2021	Best Actor in a Supporting Role	Kodi Smit-McPhee – The Power of the Dog (WON)	
2021	Best Actor in a Supporting Role	Jamie Dornan – Belfast	
2021	Best Actor in a Supporting Role	Troy Kotsur – CODA	
2021	Best Actor in a Supporting Role	Ciarán Hinds – Belfast	
2021	Best Actor in a Supporting Role	Jesse Plemons – The Power of the Dog	
2021	Best Screenplay, Original	Belfast – Kenneth Branagh (WON)	
2021	Best Screenplay, Original	Being the Ricardos – Aaron Sorkin	
2021	Best Screenplay, Original	Don't Look Up – Adam McKay	
2021	Best Screenplay, Original	Licorice Pizza – Paul Thomas Anderson	
2021	Best Screenplay, Original	Mass – Fran Kranz	
2021	Best Screenplay, Adapted	The Power of the Dog – Jane Campion (WON)	
2021	Best Screenplay, Adapted	CODA – Sian Heder	
2021	Best Screenplay, Adapted	Dune – Jon Spaihts, Denis Villeneuve, Eric Roth	
2021	Best Screenplay, Adapted	The Lost Daughter – Maggie Gyllenhaal	
2021	Best Screenplay, Adapted	Passing – Rebecca Hall	
2021	Best Documentary	Flee (WON) (TIE)	
2021	Best Documentary	Summer of Soul (...Or, When the Revolution Could Not Be Televised) (WON) (TIE)	
2021	Best Documentary	Ascension	
2021	Best Documentary	Julia	
2021	Best Documentary	Val	
2021	Best Animated Film	Encanto (WON) (TIE)	
2021	Best Animated Film	The Mitchells vs. the Machines (WON) (TIE)	
2021	Best Animated Film	Flee	
2021	Best Animated Film	Luca	
2021	Best Animated Film	Raya and the Last Dragon	
2021	Best Ensemble Cast – Casting Director(s)	The Power of the Dog – Nikki Barrett, Tina Cleary, Carmen Cuba, Nina Gold (WON)	
2021	Best Ensemble Cast – Casting Director(s)	Belfast – Lucy Bevan, Emily Brockmann	
2021	Best Ensemble Cast – Casting Director(s)	The French Dispatch – Douglas Aibel, Antoinette Boulat	
2021	Best Ensemble Cast – Casting Director(s)	The Harder They Fall – Victoria Thomas	
2021	Best Ensemble Cast – Casting Director(s)	King Richard – Rich Delia, Avy Kaufman	
2021	Best Cinematography	The Power of the Dog – Ari Wegner (WON)	
2021	Best Cinematography	Belfast – Haris Zambarloukos	
2021	Best Cinematography	Dune – Greig Fraser	
2021	Best Cinematography	Passing – Eduard Grau	
2021	Best Cinematography	The Tragedy of Macbeth – Bruno Delbonnel	
2021	Best Editing	The Power of the Dog – Peter Sciberras (WON)	
2021	Best Editing	Belfast – Úna Ní Dhonghaíle	
2021	Best Editing	Don't Look Up – Hank Corwin	
2021	Best Editing	Dune – Joe Walker	
2021	Best Editing	West Side Story – Sarah Broshar, Michael Kahn	
2021	Best Non-English-language Film	Drive My Car (WON)	
2021	Best Non-English-language Film	Flee	
2021	Best Non-English-language Film	A Hero	
2021	Best Non-English-language Film	I'm Your Man	
2021	Best Non-English-language Film	Titane	
2022	Best Film	The Banshees of Inisherin (WON)	
2022	Best Film	Everything Everywhere All at Once	
2022	Best Film	The Fabelmans	
2022	Best Film	Tár	
2022	Best Film	The Woman King	
2022	Best Film	Women Talking	
2022	Best Director	Sarah Polley – Women Talking (WON)	
2022	Best Director	Daniel Kwan and Daniel Scheinert – Everything Everywhere All at Once	
2022	Best Director	Martin McDonagh – The Banshees of Inisherin	
2022	Best Director	Gina Prince-Bythewood – The Woman King	
2022	Best Director	Steven Spielberg – The Fabelmans	
2022	Best Director	Charlotte Wells – Aftersun	
2022	Best Actress	Michelle Yeoh – Everything Everywhere All at Once (WON)	
2022	Best Actress	Cate Blanchett – Tár	
2022	Best Actress	Viola Davis – The Woman King	
2022	Best Actress	Danielle Deadwyler – Till	
2022	Best Actress	Vicky Krieps – Corsage	
2022	Best Actress	Emma Thompson – Good Luck to You, Leo Grande	
2022	Best Actress in a Supporting Role	Kerry Condon – The Banshees of Inisherin (WON) (TIE)	
2022	Best Actress in a Supporting Role	Jamie Lee Curtis – Everything Everywhere All at Once (WON) (TIE)	
2022	Best Actress in a Supporting Role	Angela Bassett – Black Panther: Wakanda Forever	
2022	Best Actress in a Supporting Role	Jessie Buckley – Women Talking	
2022	Best Actress in a Supporting Role	Hong Chau – The Whale	
2022	Best Actress in a Supporting Role	Janelle Monáe – Glass Onion: A Knives Out Mystery	
2022	Best Actor	Colin Farrell – The Banshees of Inisherin (WON)	
2022	Best Actor	Austin Butler – Elvis	
2022	Best Actor	Brendan Fraser – The Whale	
2022	Best Actor	Paul Mescal – Aftersun	
2022	Best Actor	Bill Nighy – Living	
2022	Best Actor	Jeremy Pope – The Inspection	
2022	Best Actor in a Supporting Role	Ke Huy Quan – Everything Everywhere All at Once (WON)	
2022	Best Actor in a Supporting Role	Brendan Gleeson – The Banshees of Inisherin	
2022	Best Actor in a Supporting Role	Brian Tyree Henry – Causeway	
2022	Best Actor in a Supporting Role	Barry Keoghan – The Banshees of Inisherin	
2022	Best Actor in a Supporting Role	Eddie Redmayne – The Good Nurse	
2022	Best Actor in a Supporting Role	Ben Whishaw – Women Talking	
2022	Best Screenplay, Original	The Banshees of Inisherin – Martin McDonagh (WON)	
2022	Best Screenplay, Original	Aftersun – Charlotte Wells	
2022	Best Screenplay, Original	Everything Everywhere All at Once – Daniel Kwan and Daniel Scheinert	
2022	Best Screenplay, Original	The Fabelmans – Steven Spielberg and Tony Kushner	
2022	Best Screenplay, Original	Tár – Todd Field	
2022	Best Screenplay, Original	The Woman King – Dana Stevens and Maria Bello	
2022	Best Screenplay, Adapted	Women Talking – Sarah Polley (WON)	
2022	Best Screenplay, Adapted	All Quiet on the Western Front – Edward Berger, Lesley Paterson, Ian Stokell	
2022	Best Screenplay, Adapted	Glass Onion: A Knives Out Mystery – Rian Johnson	
2022	Best Screenplay, Adapted	She Said – Rebecca Lenkiewicz	
2022	Best Screenplay, Adapted	The Whale – Samuel D. Hunter	
2022	Best Screenplay, Adapted	The Wonder – Alice Birch, Emma Donoghue, Sebastian Lelio	
2022	Best Documentary	All the Beauty and the Bloodshed (WON)	
2022	Best Documentary	All That Breathes	
2022	Best Documentary	Descendant	
2022	Best Documentary	Fire of Love	
2022	Best Documentary	Good Night Oppy	
2022	Best Documentary	The Janes	
2022	Best Animated Film	Guillermo del Toro's Pinocchio (WON)	
2022	Best Animated Film	Marcel the Shell with Shoes On	
2022	Best Animated Film	Puss in Boots: The Last Wish	
2022	Best Animated Film	The Sea Beast	
2022	Best Animated Film	Turning Red	
2022	Best Animated Film	Wendell & Wild	
2022	Best Ensemble Cast – Casting Director	Women Talking – John Buchan and Jason Knight (WON)	
2022	Best Ensemble Cast – Casting Director	The Banshees of Inisherin – Louise Kiely	
2022	Best Ensemble Cast – Casting Director	Everything Everywhere All at Once – Sarah Finn	
2022	Best Ensemble Cast – Casting Director	Triangle of Sadness – Pauline Hansson	
2022	Best Ensemble Cast – Casting Director	Black Panther: Wakanda Forever – Sarah Finn	
2022	Best Ensemble Cast – Casting Director	The Woman King – Aisha Coley	
2022	Best Cinematography	Top Gun: Maverick – Claudio Miranda (WON) (TIE)	
2022	Best Cinematography	The Woman King – Polly Morgan (WON) (TIE)	
2022	Best Cinematography	The Banshees of Inisherin – Ben Davis	
2022	Best Cinematography	The Fabelmans – Janusz Kaminski	
2022	Best Cinematography	Empire of Light – Roger Deakins	
2022	Best Cinematography	Everything Everywhere All at Once – Larkin Seiple	
2022	Best Editing	Everything Everywhere All at Once – Paul Rogers (WON)	
2022	Best Editing	Elvis – Jonathan Redmond and Matt Villa	
2022	Best Editing	Tár – Monika Willis	
2022	Best Editing	Top Gun: Maverick – Eddie Hamilton	
2022	Best Editing	The Woman King – Terilyn A. Shropshire	
2022	Best Editing	Women Talking – Christopher Donaldson, Rosalyn Kallop	
2022	Best Non-English-Language Film	Decision to Leave (WON) (TIE)	
2022	Best Non-English-Language Film	RRR (WON) (TIE)	
2022	Best Non-English-Language Film	All Quiet on the Western Front	
2022	Best Non-English-Language Film	Bardo, False Chronicle of a Handful of Truths	
2022	Best Non-English-Language Film	Happening	
2022	Best Non-English-Language Film	Saint Omer	
2023	Best Film	The Zone of Interest (WON)	
2023	Best Film	American Fiction	
2023	Best Film	Anatomy of a Fall	
2023	Best Film	Barbie	
2023	Best Film	The Holdovers	
2023	Best Film	Killers of the Flower Moon	
2023	Best Film	Oppenheimer	
2023	Best Film	Past Lives	
2023	Best Director	Greta Gerwig – Barbie (WON)	
2023	Best Director	Jonathan Glazer – The Zone of Interest	
2023	Best Director	Martin Scorsese – Killers of the Flower Moon	
2023	Best Director	Celine Song – Past Lives	
2023	Best Director	Justine Triet – Anatomy of a Fall	
2023	Best Actress	Lily Gladstone – Killers of the Flower Moon (WON)	
2023	Best Actress	Sandra Hüller – Anatomy of a Fall	
2023	Best Actress	Greta Lee – Past Lives	
2023	Best Actress	Margot Robbie – Barbie	
2023	Best Actress	Emma Stone – Poor Things	
2023	Best Actress in a Supporting Role	Da'Vine Joy Randolph – The Holdovers (WON)	
2023	Best Actress in a Supporting Role	Danielle Brooks – The Color Purple	
2023	Best Actress in a Supporting Role	America Ferrera – Barbie	
2023	Best Actress in a Supporting Role	Sandra Huller – The Zone of Interest	
2023	Best Actress in a Supporting Role	Rosamund Pike – Saltburn	
2023	Best Actor	Jeffrey Wright – American Fiction (WON)	
2023	Best Actor	Bradley Cooper – Maestro	
2023	Best Actor	Paul Giamatti – The Holdovers	
2023	Best Actor	Cillian Murphy – Oppenheimer	
2023	Best Actor	Andrew Scott – All of Us Strangers	
2023	Best Actor in a Supporting Role	Ryan Gosling – Barbie (WON)	
2023	Best Actor in a Supporting Role	Sterling K. Brown – American Fiction	
2023	Best Actor in a Supporting Role	Robert Downey Jr. – Oppenheimer	
2023	Best Actor in a Supporting Role	Charles Melton – May December	
2023	Best Actor in a Supporting Role	Mark Ruffalo – Poor Things	
2023	Best Screenplay, Original	Barbie – Greta Gerwig and Noah Baumbach (WON)	
2023	Best Screenplay, Original	Anatomy of a Fall – Justine Triet and Arthur Harari	
2023	Best Screenplay, Original	The Holdovers – David Hemingson	
2023	Best Screenplay, Original	May December – Samy Burch	
2023	Best Screenplay, Original	Past Lives – Celine Song	
2023	Best Screenplay, Adapted	American Fiction – Cord Jefferson (WON)	
2023	Best Screenplay, Adapted	Killers of the Flower Moon – Eric Roth and Martin Scorsese	
2023	Best Screenplay, Adapted	Oppenheimer – Christopher Nolan	
2023	Best Screenplay, Adapted	Poor Things – Tony McNamara	
2023	Best Screenplay, Adapted	The Zone of Interest – Jonathan Glazer	
2023	Best Documentary	American Symphony (WON/TIE)	
2023	Best Documentary	Smoke Sauna Sisterhood (WON/TIE)	
2023	Best Documentary	20 Days in Mariupol	
2023	Best Documentary	Beyond Utopia	
2023	Best Documentary	Four Daughters	
2023	Best Animated Film	The Boy and the Heron (WON)	
2023	Best Animated Film	Nimona	
2023	Best Animated Film	Robot Dreams	
2023	Best Animated Film	Spider-Man: Across the Spider-Verse	
2023	Best Animated Film	Teenage Mutant Ninja Turtles: Mutant Mayhem	
2023	Best Ensemble Cast – Casting Director	American Fiction – Jennifer Euston (WON/TIE)	
2023	Best Ensemble Cast – Casting Director	Barbie – Lucy Brava and Allison Jones (WON/TIE)	
2023	Best Ensemble Cast – Casting Director	The Holdovers – Susan Shopmaker	
2023	Best Ensemble Cast – Casting Director	Killers of the Flower Moon – Ellen Lewis	
2023	Best Ensemble Cast – Casting Director	Oppenheimer – John Papsidera	
2023	Best Cinematography	Killers of the Flower Moon – Rodrigo Prieto (WON)	
2023	Best Cinematography	Maestro – Matthew Libatique	
2023	Best Cinematography	Oppenheimer – Hoyte van Hoytema	
2023	Best Cinematography	Poor Things – Robbie Ryan	
2023	Best Cinematography	The Zone of Interest – Lukasz Zal	
2023	Best Editing	Killers of the Flower Moon – Thelma Schoonmaker (WON)	
2023	Best Editing	Anatomy of a Fall – Laurent Senechal	
2023	Best Editing	Maestro – Michelle Tesoro	
2023	Best Editing	Oppenheimer – Jennifer Lame	
2023	Best Editing	The Zone of Interest – Paul Watts	
2023	Best Non-English-Language Film	The Zone of Interest (WON)	
2023	Best Non-English-Language Film	Anatomy of a Fall	
2023	Best Non-English-Language Film	Fallen Leaves	
2023	Best Non-English-Language Film	Past Lives	
2023	Best Non-English-Language Film	The Teachers' Lounge	
2024	Best Film	The Brutalist (WON)	
2024	Best Film	Conclave	
2024	Best Film	Emilia Pérez	
2024	Best Film	Nickel Boys	
2024	Best Film	Sing Sing	
2024	Best Film	Anora	
2024	Best Film	The Substance	
2024	Best Film	Wicked	
2024	Best Director	Coralie Fargeat – The Substance (WON)	
2024	Best Director	Sean Baker – Anora	
2024	Best Director	Edward Berger – Conclave	
2024	Best Director	Brady Corbet – The Brutalist	
2024	Best Director	Jacques Audiard – Emilia Pérez	
2024	Best Director	Payal Kapadia – All We Imagine as Light	
2024	Best Actress	Marianne Jean-Baptiste – Hard Truths (WON)	
2024	Best Actress	Karla Sofía Gascón – Emilia Pérez	
2024	Best Actress	Cynthia Erivo – Wicked	
2024	Best Actress	Mikey Madison – Anora	
2024	Best Actress	Demi Moore – The Substance	
2024	Best Actress	June Squibb – Thelma	
2024	Best Actress in a Supporting Role	Isabella Rossellini – Conclave (WON)	
2024	Best Actress in a Supporting Role	Danielle Deadwyler – The Piano Lesson	
2024	Best Actress in a Supporting Role	Aunjanue Ellis-Taylor – Nickel Boys	
2024	Best Actress in a Supporting Role	Margaret Qualley – The Substance	
2024	Best Actress in a Supporting Role	Joan Chen – Dìdi	
2024	Best Actress in a Supporting Role	Zoe Saldaña – Emilia Pérez	
2024	Best Actor	Colman Domingo – Sing Sing (WON)	
2024	Best Actor	Daniel Craig – Queer	
2024	Best Actor	Adrien Brody – The Brutalist	
2024	Best Actor	Ralph Fiennes – Conclave	
2024	Best Actor	Hugh Grant – Heretic	
2024	Best Actor	Sebastian Stan – The Apprentice	
2024	Best Actor in a Supporting Role	Kieran Culkin – A Real Pain (WON)	
2024	Best Actor in a Supporting Role	Yura Borisov – Anora	
2024	Best Actor in a Supporting Role	Clarence Maclin – Sing Sing	
2024	Best Actor in a Supporting Role	Guy Pearce – The Brutalist	
2024	Best Actor in a Supporting Role	Stanley Tucci – Conclave	
2024	Best Actor in a Supporting Role	Denzel Washington – Gladiator II	
2024	Best Screenplay, Original	The Substance – Coralie Fargeat (WON)	
2024	Best Screenplay, Original	Anora – Sean Baker	
2024	Best Screenplay, Original	A Real Pain – Jesse Eisenberg	
2024	Best Screenplay, Original	Hard Truths – Mike Leigh	
2024	Best Screenplay, Original	All We Imagine as Light – Payal Kapadia	
2024	Best Screenplay, Original	The Brutalist – Brady Corbet & Mona Fastvold	
2024	Best Screenplay, Adapted	Conclave – Peter Straughan & Robert Harris (WON)	
2024	Best Screenplay, Adapted	Emilia Pérez – Jacques Audiard, Thomas Bidegain & Lea Mysius	
2024	Best Screenplay, Adapted	Nickel Boys – RaMell Ross, Joslyn Barnes & Colson Whitehead	
2024	Best Screenplay, Adapted	Nosferatu – Robert Eggers	
2024	Best Screenplay, Adapted	Sing Sing – John H. Richardson, Brent Buell & Clint Bentley, Greg Kwedar	
2024	Best Screenplay, Adapted	The Wild Robot – Chris Sanders & Peter Brown	
2024	Best Documentary	Dahomey (WON)	
2024	Best Documentary	Black Box Diaries	
2024	Best Documentary	Daughters	
2024	Best Documentary	The Last of the Sea Women	
2024	Best Documentary	Sugarcane	
2024	Best Documentary	Will & Harper	
2024	Best Animated Film	Flow (WON/TIE)	
2024	Best Animated Film	The Wild Robot (WON/TIE)	
2024	Best Animated Film	Inside Out 2	
2024	Best Animated Film	Memoir of a Snail	
2024	Best Animated Film	Hundreds of Beavers	
2024	Best Animated Film	Wallace & Gromit: Vengeance Most Fowl	
2024	Best Ensemble Cast and Casting Director	Conclave (WON)	
2024	Best Ensemble Cast and Casting Director	Challengers	
2024	Best Ensemble Cast and Casting Director	Anora	
2024	Best Ensemble Cast and Casting Director	Emilia Pérez	
2024	Best Ensemble Cast and Casting Director	Saturday Night	
2024	Best Ensemble Cast and Casting Director	Wicked	
2024	Best Cinematography	Nosferatu – Jarin Blaschke (WON)	
2024	Best Cinematography	Dune: Part Two – Greig Fraser	
2024	Best Cinematography	Nickel Boys – Jomo Fray	
2024	Best Cinematography	Conclave – Stéphane Fontaine	
2024	Best Cinematography	The Brutalist – Lol Crawley	
2024	Best Cinematography	Wicked – Alice Brooks	
2024	Best Editing	Emilia Pérez – Juliette Welfling (WON/TIE)	
2024	Best Editing	The Brutalist – Dávid Jancsó (WON/TIE)	
2024	Best Editing	Anora – Sean Baker	
2024	Best Editing	Furiosa: A Mad Max Saga – Eliot Knapman & Margaret Sixel	
2024	Best Editing	Conclave – Nick Emerson	
2024	Best Editing	The Substance – Coralie Fargeat, Jérôme Eltabet & Valentin Feron	
2024	Best International Film	The Seed of the Sacred Fig (WON)	
2024	Best International Film	Dahomey	
2024	Best International Film	Emilia Pérez	
2024	Best International Film	Flow	
2024	Best International Film	La chimera	
2024	Best International Film	All We Imagine as Light	
2025	Best Film	Sinners (WON)	
2025	Best Film	Hamnet	
2025	Best Film	It Was Just an Accident	
2025	Best Film	One Battle After Another	
2025	Best Film	The Secret Agent	
2025	Best Film	Sentimental Value	
2025	Best Film	Frankenstein	
2025	Best Film	Train Dreams	
2025	Best Director	Ryan Coogler – Sinners (WON)	
2025	Best Director	Paul Thomas Anderson – One Battle After Another	
2025	Best Director	Jafar Panahi – It Was Just an Accident	
2025	Best Director	Joachim Trier – Sentimental Value	
2025	Best Director	Chloé Zhao – Hamnet	
2025	Best Actress	Jessie Buckley – Hamnet (WON)	
2025	Best Actress	Rose Byrne – If I Had Legs I'd Kick You	
2025	Best Actress	Renate Reinsve – Sentimental Value	
2025	Best Actress	Emma Stone – Bugonia	
2025	Best Actress	Tessa Thompson – Hedda	
2025	Best Actress in a Supporting Role	Wunmi Mosaku – Sinners (WON)	
2025	Best Actress in a Supporting Role	Inga Ibsdotter Lilleaas – Sentimental Value	
2025	Best Actress in a Supporting Role	Amy Madigan – Weapons	
2025	Best Actress in a Supporting Role	Nina Hoss – Hedda	
2025	Best Actress in a Supporting Role	Teyana Taylor – One Battle After Another	
2025	Best Actor	Michael B. Jordan – Sinners (WON)	
2025	Best Actor	Joel Edgerton – Train Dreams	
2025	Best Actor	Ethan Hawke – Blue Moon	
2025	Best Actor	Leonardo DiCaprio – One Battle After Another	
2025	Best Actor	Wagner Moura – The Secret Agent	
2025	Best Actor in a Supporting Role	Stellan Skarsgård – Sentimental Value (WON)	
2025	Best Actor in a Supporting Role	Jacob Elordi – Frankenstein	
2025	Best Actor in a Supporting Role	Paul Mescal – Hamnet	
2025	Best Actor in a Supporting Role	Sean Penn – One Battle After Another	
2025	Best Actor in a Supporting Role	Benicio del Toro – One Battle After Another	
2025	Best Screenplay, Original	Sinners – Ryan Coogler (WON)	
2025	Best Screenplay, Original	Jay Kelly – Noah Baumbach and Emily Mortimer	
2025	Best Screenplay, Original	Sentimental Value – Eskil Vogt and Joachim Trier	
2025	Best Screenplay, Original	It Was Just an Accident – Jafar Panahi	
2025	Best Screenplay, Original	Sorry, Baby – Eva Victor	
2025	Best Screenplay, Adapted	Hamnet – Chloé Zhao and Maggie O'Farrell (WON)	
2025	Best Screenplay, Adapted	Frankenstein – Guillermo del Toro	
2025	Best Screenplay, Adapted	Bugonia – Will Tracy	
2025	Best Screenplay, Adapted	One Battle After Another – Paul Thomas Anderson	
2025	Best Screenplay, Adapted	Train Dreams – Clint Bentley and Greg Kwedar	
2025	Best Documentary	The Perfect Neighbor (WON)	
2025	Best Documentary	My Mom Jayne	
2025	Best Documentary	Orwell: 2+2=5	
2025	Best Documentary	The Librarians	
2025	Best Documentary	Come See Me in the Good Light	
2025	Best Animated Film	KPop Demon Hunters (WON)	
2025	Best Animated Film	In Your Dreams	
2025	Best Animated Film	Arco	
2025	Best Animated Film	Little Amélie or the Character of Rain	
2025	Best Animated Film	Zootopia 2	
2025	Best Ensemble Cast and Casting Director	Sinners – Francine Maisler (WON)	
2025	Best Ensemble Cast and Casting Director	Marty Supreme – Jennifer Venditti	
2025	Best Ensemble Cast and Casting Director	Nouvelle Vague – Stéphane Batut	
2025	Best Ensemble Cast and Casting Director	One Battle After Another – Cassandra Kulukundis	
2025	Best Ensemble Cast and Casting Director	Hamnet – Nina Gold	
2025	Best Cinematography	Sinners – Autumn Durald Arkapaw (WON)	
2025	Best Cinematography	Hamnet – Łukasz Żal	
2025	Best Cinematography	One Battle After Another – Michael Bauman	
2025	Best Cinematography	Frankenstein – Dan Laustsen	
2025	Best Cinematography	Train Dreams – Adolpho Veloso	
2025	Best Editing	One Battle After Another – Andy Jurgensen (WON)	
2025	Best Editing	Hamnet – Affonso Gonçalves and Chloe Zhao	
2025	Best Editing	Marty Supreme – Ronald Bronstein and Josh Safdie	
2025	Best Editing	F1 – Stephen Mirrione	
2025	Best Editing	Sinners – Michael P. Shawver	
2025	Best International Film	Sentimental Value (WON)	
2025	Best International Film	No Other Choice	
2025	Best International Film	It Was Just an Accident	
2025	Best International Film	The Secret Agent	
2025	Best International Film	Sirāt	

== EDA Female Focus Awards winners and nominees ==
Table key
(WON)	Indicates the winner

Year	Category	Nominee	Ref.
2007	Best Woman Director	Sarah Polley – Away from Her (WON)	
2007	Best Woman Director	Tamara Jenkins – The Savages	
2007	Best Woman Director	Kasi Lemmons – Talk to Me	
2007	Best Woman Director	Mira Nair – The Namesake	
2007	Best Woman Screenwriter	Tamara Jenkins – The Savages (WON)	
2007	Best Woman Screenwriter	Diablo Cody – Juno	
2007	Best Woman Screenwriter	Sarah Polley – Away from Her	
2007	Best Woman Screenwriter	Adrienne Shelly – Waitress	
2007	Best Breakthrough Performance	Elliot Page – Juno (WON)	
2007	Best Breakthrough Performance	Amy Adams – Enchanted	
2007	Best Breakthrough Performance	Amy Ryan – Gone Baby Gone	
2007	Best Breakthrough Performance	Keri Russell – Waitress and August Rush	
2007	Best Newcomer	Saoirse Ronan – Atonement (WON)	
2007	Best Newcomer	Nikki Blonsky – Hairspray	
2007	Best Newcomer	Tang Wei – Lust, Caution	
2007	Best Newcomer	Luisa Williams – Day Night Day Night	
2007	Women's Image Award	Sarah Polley (WON)	
2007	Women's Image Award	Jodie Foster	
2007	Women's Image Award	Laura Linney	
2007	Women's Image Award	Adrienne Shelly	
2007	Hanging in There Award for Persistence	Ruby Dee (WON)	
2007	Hanging in There Award for Persistence	Anne Sundberg and Ricki Stern – The Devil Came on Horseback	
2007	Actress Defying Age and Ageism	Julie Christie (WON)	
2007	Actress Defying Age and Ageism	Brenda Blethyn	
2007	Actress Defying Age and Ageism	Vanessa Redgrave	
2007	Actress Defying Age and Ageism	Meryl Streep	
2007	Outstanding Achievement by a Woman in 2007	Kathleen Kennedy, Producer – The Diving Bell and the Butterfly and Persepolis (WON)	
2007	Outstanding Achievement by a Woman in 2007	Sarah Polley	
2007	Outstanding Achievement by a Woman in 2007	Adrienne Shelly	
2007	Lifetime Achievement Award	Julie Christie (WON)	
2007	Lifetime Achievement Award	Mia Farrow	
2007	Lifetime Achievement Award	Vanessa Redgrave	
2007	Lifetime Achievement Award	Adrienne Shelly	
2007	AWFJ Award for Humanitarian Activism	Angelina Jolie (WON)	
2007	AWFJ Award for Humanitarian Activism	Ruby Dee	
2007	AWFJ Award for Humanitarian Activism	Mia Farrow	
2007	AWFJ Award for Humanitarian Activism	Susan Sarandon	
2008	Best Woman Director	Courtney Hunt – Frozen River (WON)	
2008	Best Woman Director	Isabel Coixet – Elegy	
2008	Best Woman Director	Kimberly Peirce – Stop-Loss	
2008	Best Woman Director	Kelly Reichardt – Wendy and Lucy	
2008	Best Woman Screenwriter	Jenny Lumet – Rachel Getting Married (WON)	
2008	Best Woman Screenwriter	Courtney Hunt – Frozen River	
2008	Best Woman Screenwriter	Kelly Reichardt – Wendy and Lucy	
2008	Best Breakthrough Performance	Sally Hawkins – Happy-Go-Lucky (WON)	
2008	Best Breakthrough Performance	Rebecca Hall – Vicky Cristina Barcelona	
2008	Best Breakthrough Performance	Melissa Leo – Frozen River	
2008	Best Newcomer	Misty Upham – Frozen River (WON)	
2008	Best Newcomer	Zoe Kazan – Revolutionary Road	
2008	Best Newcomer	David Kross – The Reader	
2008	Women's Image Award	Kristin Scott Thomas (WON)	
2008	Women's Image Award	Meryl Streep	
2008	Women's Image Award	Emma Thompson	
2008	Hanging in There Award for Persistence	Melissa Leo – Frozen River (WON)	
2008	Hanging in There Award for Persistence	Courtney Hunt	
2008	Hanging in There Award for Persistence	Ellen Kuras	
2008	Hanging in There Award for Persistence	Kristin Scott Thomas	
2008	Actress Defying Age and Ageism	Catherine Deneuve – A Christmas Tale (WON)	
2008	Actress Defying Age and Ageism	Meryl Streep – Mamma Mia!	
2008	Actress Defying Age and Ageism	Emma Thompson – Last Chance Harvey	
2008	2008 Outstanding Achievement by a Woman in the Film Industry	Sheila Nevins – Producing/Programming at HBO (WON)	
2008	2008 Outstanding Achievement by a Woman in the Film Industry	Kathleen Kennedy – Producer, The Curious Case of Benjamin Button	
2008	2008 Outstanding Achievement by a Woman in the Film Industry	Kate Winslet – for her performances in The Reader and Revolutionary Road	
2008	Lifetime Achievement Award	Catherine Deneuve (WON)	
2008	Lifetime Achievement Award	Dame Judi Dench	
2008	Lifetime Achievement Award	Meryl Streep	
2008	Award for Humanitarian Activism	All of the Women in Pray the Devil Back to Hell (WON)	
2008	Award for Humanitarian Activism	Angelina Jolie	
2008	Award for Humanitarian Activism	Courtney Hunt	
2009	Best Woman Director	Kathryn Bigelow – The Hurt Locker (WON)	
2009	Best Woman Director	Jane Campion – Bright Star	
2009	Best Woman Director	Lone Scherfig – An Education	
2009	Best Woman Screenwriter	Jane Campion – Bright Star (WON)	
2009	Best Woman Screenwriter	Nora Ephron – Julie & Julia	
2009	Best Woman Screenwriter	Rebecca Miller – The Private Lives of Pippa Lee	
2009	Best Animated Female	Coraline – Coraline (WON)	
2009	Best Animated Female	Ellie – Up	
2009	Best Animated Female	Mrs. Fox – Fantastic Mr. Fox	
2009	Best Breakthrough Performance	Carey Mulligan – An Education (WON)	
2009	Best Breakthrough Performance	Anna Kendrick – Up in the Air	
2009	Best Breakthrough Performance	Gabourey Sidibe – Precious	
2009	Women's Image Award	Kathryn Bigelow (WON)	
2009	Women's Image Award	Jane Campion	
2009	Women's Image Award	Meryl Streep	
2009	Perseverance Award	Agnès Varda (WON)	
2009	Perseverance Award	Drew Barrymore	
2009	Perseverance Award	Kathryn Bigelow	
2009	Actress Defying Age and Ageism	Meryl Streep – Julie & Julia and It's Complicated (WON)	
2009	Actress Defying Age and Ageism	Sophia Loren	
2009	Actress Defying Age and Ageism	Robin Wright Penn	
2009	Actress Defying Age and Ageism	Michelle Pfeiffer	
2009	Sexist Pig Award	Robert Luketic – The Ugly Truth (WON)	
2009	Sexist Pig Award	Michael Bay – Transformers: Revenge of the Fallen	
2009	Sexist Pig Award	Zach Cregger and Trevor Moore – Miss March	
2009	This Year's Outstanding Achievement by a Woman in the Film Industry	Kathryn Bigelow – The Hurt Locker (WON)	
2009	This Year's Outstanding Achievement by a Woman in the Film Industry	Jane Campion – Bright Star	
2009	This Year's Outstanding Achievement by a Woman in the Film Industry	Meryl Streep – Julie & Julia and It's Complicated	
2009	Lifetime Achievement Award	Agnès Varda (WON)	
2009	Lifetime Achievement Award	Jane Campion	
2009	Lifetime Achievement Award	Meryl Streep	
2009	Award for Humanitarian Activism	Rebecca Cammisa – Which Way Home (WON)	
2009	Award for Humanitarian Activism	Mia Farrow	
2009	Award for Humanitarian Activism	Angelina Jolie	
2010	Best Woman Director	Debra Granik – Winter's Bone (WON)	
2010	Best Woman Director	Andrea Arnold – Fish Tank	
2010	Best Woman Director	Lisa Cholodenko – The Kids Are All Right	
2010	Best Woman Director	Sofia Coppola – Somewhere	
2010	Best Woman Director	Nicole Holofcener – Please Give	
2010	Best Woman Screenwriter	Lisa Cholodenko – The Kids Are All Right (WON)	
2010	Best Woman Screenwriter	Andrea Arnold – Fish Tank	
2010	Best Woman Screenwriter	Sofia Coppola – Somewhere	
2010	Best Woman Screenwriter	Debra Granik – Winter's Bone	
2010	Best Woman Screenwriter	Nicole Holofcener – Please Give	
2010	Best Woman Screenwriter	Laeta Kalogridis – Shutter Island	
2010	Best Female Action Star	Noomi Rapace – The Girl with the Dragon Tattoo (2009) (WON)	
2010	Best Female Action Star	Angelina Jolie – Salt	
2010	Best Female Action Star	Helen Mirren – Red	
2010	Best Female Action Star	Chloë Grace Moretz – Kick-Ass	
2010	Best Female Action Star	Hailee Steinfeld – True Grit	
2010	Best Animated Female	Astrid – How To Train Your Dragon (WON)	
2010	Best Animated Female	Barbie – Toy Story 3	
2010	Best Animated Female	Jessie – Toy Story 3	
2010	Best Animated Female	Margo, Edith, and Agnes – Despicable Me	
2010	Best Animated Female	Mother Gothel – Tangled	
2010	Best Animated Female	Rapunzel – Tangled	
2010	Best Breakthrough Performance	Jennifer Lawrence – Winter's Bone (WON)	
2010	Best Breakthrough Performance	Lena Dunham – Tiny Furniture	
2010	Best Breakthrough Performance	Chloë Grace Moretz – Kick-Ass	
2010	Best Breakthrough Performance	Noomi Rapace – Girl with the Dragon Tattoo (2009)	
2010	Best Breakthrough Performance	Hailee Steinfeld – True Grit	
2010	Women's Image Award	Annette Bening – The Kids Are All Right (WON)	
2010	Women's Image Award	Sally Hawkins – Made in Dagenham	
2010	Women's Image Award	Helen Mirren – Red	
2010	Women's Image Award	Noomi Rapace – Girl With The Dragon Tattoo (2009)	
2010	Women's Image Award	Hailee Steinfeld – True Grit	
2010	Perseverance Award	Joan Rivers (WON)	
2010	Perseverance Award	Cher	
2010	Perseverance Award	Lisa Cholodenko	
2010	Perseverance Award	Melissa Leo	
2010	Perseverance Award	Winona Ryder	
2010	Actress Defying Age and Ageism	Helen Mirren (WON)	
2010	Actress Defying Age and Ageism	Annette Bening	
2010	Actress Defying Age and Ageism	Patricia Clarkson	
2010	Actress Defying Age and Ageism	Melissa Leo	
2010	Actress Defying Age and Ageism	Julianne Moore	
2010	Sexist Pig Award	Mel Gibson (WON)	
2010	Sexist Pig Award	Michael Bay	
2010	Sexist Pig Award	Michael Patrick King	
2010	Sexist Pig Award	Michael Winterbottom	
2010	Sexist Pig Award	Mark Zuckerberg (the character in The Social Network)	
2010	This Year's Outstanding Achievement by a Woman in the Film Industry	Debra Granik – Winter's Bone (WON)	
2010	This Year's Outstanding Achievement by a Woman in the Film Industry	Lisa Cholodenko – The Kids Are All Right	
2010	This Year's Outstanding Achievement by a Woman in the Film Industry	Lena Dunham – Tiny Furniture	
2010	This Year's Outstanding Achievement by a Woman in the Film Industry	Tanya Hamilton – Night Catches Us	
2010	This Year's Outstanding Achievement by a Woman in the Film Industry	Helen Mirren – for opening five movies in the US	
2010	Lifetime Achievement Award	Claire Denis (WON) (TIE)	
2010	Lifetime Achievement Award	Helen Mirren (WON) (TIE)	
2010	Lifetime Achievement Award	Annette Bening	
2010	Lifetime Achievement Award	Ruby Dee	
2010	Lifetime Achievement Award	Julie Taymor	
2010	Award for Humanitarian Activism	Sandra Bullock (WON) (TIE)	
2010	Award for Humanitarian Activism	Sean Penn (WON) (TIE)	
2010	Award for Humanitarian Activism	Angelina Jolie	
2010	Award for Humanitarian Activism	Oprah Winfrey	
2011	Best Woman Director	Lynne Ramsay – We Need to Talk About Kevin (WON)	
2011	Best Woman Director	Dee Rees – Pariah	
2011	Best Woman Director	Vera Farmiga – Higher Ground	
2011	Best Woman Director	Kelly Reichardt – Meek's Cutoff	
2011	Best Woman Director	Jennifer Yuh – Kung Fu Panda 2	
2011	Best Woman Screenwriter	Kristen Wiig and Annie Mumolo – Bridesmaids (WON)	
2011	Best Woman Screenwriter	Diablo Cody – Young Adult	
2011	Best Woman Screenwriter	Abi Morgan – The Iron Lady	
2011	Best Woman Screenwriter	Lynne Ramsay and Rory Kinnear – We Need To Talk About Kevin	
2011	Best Woman Screenwriter	Dee Rees – Pariah	
2011	Kick Ass Award for Best Female Action Star	Rooney Mara – Girl With The Dragon Tattoo (2011) (WON) (TIE)	
2011	Kick Ass Award for Best Female Action Star	Saoirse Ronan – Hanna (WON) (TIE)	
2011	Kick Ass Award for Best Female Action Star	Helen Mirren – The Debt	
2011	Kick Ass Award for Best Female Action Star	Paula Patton – Mission: Impossible – Ghost Protocol	
2011	Kick Ass Award for Best Female Action Star	Zoe Saldaña – Colombiana	
2011	Best Animated Female	Beans – Isla Fisher – Rango (WON)	
2011	Best Animated Female	Juliet – Emily Blunt – Gnomeo & Juliet	
2011	Best Animated Female	Jewel – Anne Hathaway – Rio	
2011	Best Animated Female	Kitty Softpaws – Salma Hayek – Puss in Boots	
2011	Best Animated Female	Master Tigress – Angelina Jolie – Kung Fu Panda 2	
2011	Best Breakthrough Performance	Elizabeth Olsen – Martha Marcy May Marlene (WON)	
2011	Best Breakthrough Performance	Jessica Chastain – The Tree of Life	
2011	Best Breakthrough Performance	Adepero Oduye – Pariah	
2011	Best Breakthrough Performance	Rooney Mara – The Girl with the Dragon Tattoo (2011)	
2011	Best Breakthrough Performance	Shailene Woodley – The Descendants	
2011	Female Icon Award	Glenn Close – Albert Nobbs (WON)	
2011	Female Icon Award	Viola Davis – The Help	
2011	Female Icon Award	Meryl Streep – The Iron Lady	
2011	Actress Defying Age and Ageism	Helen Mirren – The Debt (WON)	
2011	Actress Defying Age and Ageism	Glenn Close – Albert Nobbs	
2011	Actress Defying Age and Ageism	Judi Dench – J. Edgar	
2011	Actress Defying Age and Ageism	Vanessa Redgrave – Coriolanus	
2011	Actress Defying Age and Ageism	Meryl Streep – The Iron Lady	
2011	This Year's Outstanding Achievement by a Woman in the Film Industry	Jessica Chastain – for performances in four highly acclaimed films (WON)	
2011	This Year's Outstanding Achievement by a Woman in the Film Industry	Thelma Schoonmaker – for editing Hugo	
2011	This Year's Outstanding Achievement by a Woman in the Film Industry	Stacey Snider – for helming DreamWorks	
2011	This Year's Outstanding Achievement by a Woman in the Film Industry	Kristen Wiig – for Bridesmaids	
2011	Award for Humanitarian Activism	Angelina Jolie – for UN work and making In the Land of Blood and Honey to raise awareness about genocide (WON)	
2011	Award for Humanitarian Activism	Sandra Bullock – for tsunami relief	
2011	Award for Humanitarian Activism	Elaine Hendrix – for Animal Rescue Corps and In Defense of Animals	
2011	Award for Humanitarian Activism	Elizabeth Taylor – for her work with AIDS	
2011	Award for Humanitarian Activism	Olivia Wilde – for relief work in Haiti	
2012	Best Woman Director	Kathryn Bigelow – Zero Dark Thirty (WON)	
2012	Best Woman Director	Andrea Arnold – Wuthering Heights	
2012	Best Woman Director	Sarah Polley – Take This Waltz	
2012	Best Woman Screenwriter	Lucy Alibar (and Benh Zeitlin) – Beasts of the Southern Wild (WON)	
2012	Best Woman Screenwriter	Zoe Kazan – Ruby Sparks	
2012	Best Woman Screenwriter	Ava DuVernay – Middle of Nowhere	
2012	Best Woman Screenwriter	Sarah Polley – Take This Waltz	
2012	Kick Ass Award for Best Female Action Star	Jennifer Lawrence – The Hunger Games (WON)	
2012	Kick Ass Award for Best Female Action Star	Gina Carano – Haywire	
2012	Kick Ass Award for Best Female Action Star	Anne Hathaway – The Dark Knight Rises	
2012	Best Animated Female	Brave – Merida (Kelly Macdonald) (WON)	
2012	Best Animated Female	Rise of the Guardians – Tooth (Isla Fisher)	
2012	Best Animated Female	Wreck-It Ralph – Vanellope (Sarah Silverman)	
2012	Best Breakthrough Performance	Quvenzhané Wallis – Beasts of the Southern Wild (WON)	
2012	Best Breakthrough Performance	Samantha Barks – Les Misérables	
2012	Best Breakthrough Performance	Ann Dowd – Compliance	
2012	Best Breakthrough Performance	Alicia Vikander – A Royal Affair	
2012	Actress Defying Age and Ageism	Judi Dench – Skyfall (WON)	
2012	Actress Defying Age and Ageism	Helen Mirren – Hitchcock	
2012	Actress Defying Age and Ageism	Emmanuelle Riva – Amour	
2012	Award for Humanitarian Activism – Female Icon Award	Jessica Chastain – Zero Dark Thirty (WON)	
2012	Award for Humanitarian Activism – Female Icon Award	Helen Hunt – The Sessions	
2012	Award for Humanitarian Activism – Female Icon Award	Judi Dench – Skyfall	
2012	This Year's Outstanding Achievement by a Woman in the Film Industry	Women Documentary Filmmakers, including Heidi Ewing and Rachel Grady (Detropia), Lauren Greenfield (The Queen of Versailles), Alison Klayman (Ai Weiwei: Never Sorry) and Sarah Burns (The Central Park Five). (WON)	
2012	This Year's Outstanding Achievement by a Woman in the Film Industry	Kathryn Bigelow – for Zero Dark Thirty	
2012	This Year's Outstanding Achievement by a Woman in the Film Industry	Jennifer Lawrence – for The Hunger Games and Silver Linings Playbook	
2013	Best Woman Director	Nicole Holofcener – Enough Said (WON)	
2013	Best Woman Director	Lake Bell – In a World...	
2013	Best Woman Director	Gabriele Cowperthwaite – Blackfish	
2013	Best Woman Director	Jennifer Lee – Frozen	
2013	Best Woman Director	Sarah Polley – Stories We Tell	
2013	Best Woman Screenwriter	Nicole Holofcener – Enough Said (WON)	
2013	Best Woman Screenwriter	Lake Bell – In a World...	
2013	Best Woman Screenwriter	Julie Delpy – Before Midnight	
2013	Best Woman Screenwriter	Jennifer Lee – Frozen	
2013	Best Woman Screenwriter	Sarah Polley – Stories We Tell	
2013	Kick Ass Award for Best Female Action Star	Sandra Bullock – Gravity (WON)	
2013	Kick Ass Award for Best Female Action Star	Jennifer Lawrence – The Hunger Games: Catching Fire	
2013	Kick Ass Award for Best Female Action Star	Chloë Grace Moretz – Kick-Ass 2	
2013	Best Animated Female	Anna (Kristen Bell) – Frozen (WON)	
2013	Best Animated Female	Eep (Emma Stone) – The Croods	
2013	Best Animated Female	Elsa (Idina Menzel) – Frozen	
2013	Best Breakthrough Performance	Lupita Nyong'o – 12 Years a Slave (WON)	
2013	Best Breakthrough Performance	Brie Larson – Short Term 12	
2013	Best Breakthrough Performance	Shailene Woodley – The Spectacular Now	
2013	Actress Defying Age and Ageism	Sandra Bullock – Gravity (WON)	
2013	Actress Defying Age and Ageism	Judi Dench – Philomena	
2013	Actress Defying Age and Ageism	Meryl Streep – August: Osage County	
2013	AWFJ Female Icon Award	Angelina Jolie – for continued commitments to humanitarian causes, and for promoting awareness about breast cancer (WON)	
2013	AWFJ Female Icon Award	Sandra Bullock – for the strong, capable and very positive female image presented in Gravity	
2013	AWFJ Female Icon Award	Jennifer Lawrence – for American Hustle and Hunger Games: Catching Fire, and for handling her high degree of celebrity extremely well	
2013	This Year's Outstanding Achievement by a Woman in the Film Industry	Haifaa Al-Mansour – for challenging the limitations placed on women within her culture (WON)	
2013	This Year's Outstanding Achievement by a Woman in the Film Industry	Cheryl Boone Isaacs – for becoming President of The Academy of Motion Picture Arts and Sciences	
2013	This Year's Outstanding Achievement by a Woman in the Film Industry	Jehane Noujaim – for risking life and limb to document the Egyptian revolution in The Square	
2014	Best Woman Director	Ava DuVernay – Selma (WON)	
2014	Best Woman Director	Jennifer Kent – The Babadook	
2014	Best Woman Director	Laura Poitras – Citizenfour	
2014	Best Woman Screenwriter	Gillian Flynn – Gone Girl (WON)	
2014	Best Woman Screenwriter	Jennifer Kent – The Babadook	
2014	Best Woman Screenwriter	Gillian Robespierre – Obvious Child	
2014	Best Female Action Star	Emily Blunt – Edge of Tomorrow (WON)	
2014	Best Female Action Star	Scarlett Johansson – Lucy	
2014	Best Female Action Star	Jennifer Lawrence – The Hunger Games: Mockingjay – Part 1	
2014	Best Breakthrough Performance	Gugu Mbatha-Raw – Belle (WON)	
2014	Best Breakthrough Performance	Essie Davis – The Babadook	
2014	Best Breakthrough Performance	Jenny Slate – Obvious Child	
2014	Female Icon Award	Ava DuVernay (WON) (TIE)	
2014	Female Icon Award	Laura Poitras (WON) (TIE)	
2014	Female Icon Award	Angelina Jolie	
2015	Best Woman Director	Marielle Heller – The Diary of a Teenage Girl (WON)	
2015	Best Woman Director	Isabel Coixet – Learning to Drive	
2015	Best Woman Director	Maya Forbes – Infinitely Polar Bear	
2015	Best Woman Director	Sarah Gavron – Suffragette	
2015	Best Woman Director	Céline Sciamma – Girlhood	
2015	Best Woman Screenwriter	Emma Donoghue – Room (WON)	
2015	Best Woman Screenwriter	Marielle Heller – The Diary of a Teenage Girl	
2015	Best Woman Screenwriter	Phyllis Nagy – Carol	
2015	Best Woman Screenwriter	Amy Schumer – Trainwreck	
2015	Best Female Action Star	Charlize Theron – Mad Max: Fury Road (WON)	
2015	Best Female Action Star	Emily Blunt – Sicario	
2015	Best Female Action Star	Jennifer Lawrence – The Hunger Games: Mockingjay – Part 2	
2015	Best Female Action Star	Daisy Ridley – Star Wars: The Force Awakens	
2015	Best Breakthrough Performance	Alicia Vikander – Ex Machina, Testament of Youth, and The Danish Girl (WON)	
2015	Best Breakthrough Performance	Brie Larson – Room	
2015	Best Breakthrough Performance	Bel Powley – The Diary of a Teenage Girl	
2015	Best Breakthrough Performance	Daisy Ridley – Star Wars: The Force Awakens	
2015	Female Icon of the Year Award	Chantal Akerman – In Memoriam For being a great filmmaker and inspiration. (WON)	
2015	Female Icon of the Year Award	Maria Giese – Activist filmmaker who is spearheading the movement for parity for women directors.	
2015	Female Icon of the Year Award	Donna Langley – Chair(wo)man, Universal Pictures, who has brought the studio to unprecedented profits.	
2015	Female Icon of the Year Award	Jennifer Lawrence – For breaking the silence about discriminatory practices and unequal pay for actresses.	
2015	Female Icon of the Year Award	Charlotte Rampling – Because she's Charlotte Rampling and is iconic.	
2016	Best Woman Director	Ava DuVernay – 13th (WON)	
2016	Best Woman Director	Andrea Arnold – American Honey	
2016	Best Woman Director	Rebecca Miller – Maggie's Plan	
2016	Best Woman Director	Mira Nair – Queen of Katwe	
2016	Best Woman Director	Kelly Reichardt – Certain Women	
2016	Best Woman Screenwriter	Kelly Reichardt – Certain Women (WON)	
2016	Best Woman Screenwriter	Andrea Arnold – American Honey	
2016	Best Woman Screenwriter	Rebecca Miller – Maggie's Plan	
2016	Best Woman Screenwriter	Lorene Scafaria – The Meddler	
2016	Best Woman Screenwriter	Laura Terruso – Hello, My Name Is Doris	
2016	Best Animated Female	Judy in Zootopia – Ginnifer Goodwin (WON) (TIE)	
2016	Best Animated Female	Moana in Moana – Auliʻi Cravalho (WON) (TIE)	
2016	Best Animated Female	Dory in Finding Dory – Ellen DeGeneres	
2016	Best Breakthrough Performance	Ruth Negga – Loving (WON)	
2016	Best Breakthrough Performance	Sasha Lane – American Honey	
2016	Best Breakthrough Performance	Janelle Monáe – Moonlight and Hidden Figures	
2016	Best Breakthrough Performance	Madina Nalwanga – Queen of Katwe	
2016	Outstanding Achievement by a Woman in the Film Industry	Ava DuVernay – For 13th and raising awareness about the need for diversity and gender equality in Hollywood. (WON)	
2016	Outstanding Achievement by a Woman in the Film Industry	Anne Hubbell and Amy Hobby for establishing Tangerine Entertainment's Juice Fund to support female filmmakers.	
2016	Outstanding Achievement by a Woman in the Film Industry	Mynette Louie – President of Gamechanger Films, which finances narrative films directed by women.	
2016	Outstanding Achievement by a Woman in the Film Industry	April Reign – for creating and mobilizing the #OscarsSoWhite campaign.	
2017	Best Woman Director	Greta Gerwig – Lady Bird (WON)	
2017	Best Woman Director	Kathryn Bigelow – Detroit	
2017	Best Woman Director	Patty Jenkins – Wonder Woman	
2017	Best Woman Director	Angelina Jolie – First They Killed My Father	
2017	Best Woman Director	Dee Rees – Mudbound	
2017	Best Woman Director	Angela Robinson – Professor Marston and the Wonder Women	
2017	Best Woman Director	Agnès Varda – Faces Places	
2017	Best Woman Screenwriter	Greta Gerwig – Lady Bird (WON)	
2017	Best Woman Screenwriter	Liz Hannah and Josh Singer – The Post	
2017	Best Woman Screenwriter	Dee Rees and Virgil Williams – Mudbound	
2017	Best Animated Female	Parvana – The Breadwinner – Saara Chaudry (WON)	
2017	Best Animated Female	Marguerite Gachet in Loving Vincent – Saoirse Ronan	
2017	Best Animated Female	Mamá Imelda Rivera in Coco – Alanna Ubach	
2017	Best Breakthrough Performance	Brooklynn Prince – The Florida Project (WON)	
2017	Best Breakthrough Performance	Florence Pugh – Lady Macbeth	
2017	Best Breakthrough Performance	Tiffany Haddish – Girls Trip	
2017	Outstanding Achievement by a Woman in the Film Industry	Rose McGowan, Ashley Judd and all who spoke out against sexual harassment (WON)	
2017	Outstanding Achievement by a Woman in the Film Industry	Greta Gerwig – for Lady Bird	
2017	Outstanding Achievement by a Woman in the Film Industry	Patty Jenkins – for Wonder Woman	
2017	Outstanding Achievement by a Woman in the Film Industry	Angelina Jolie – for First They Killed My Father and The Breadwinner	
2018	Best Woman Director	Marielle Heller – Can You Ever Forgive Me? (WON)	
2018	Best Woman Director	Elizabeth Chomko – What They Had	
2018	Best Woman Director	Debra Granik – Leave No Trace	
2018	Best Woman Director	Tamara Jenkins – Private Life	
2018	Best Woman Director	Karyn Kusama – Destroyer	
2018	Best Woman Director	Nadine Labaki – Capernaum	
2018	Best Woman Director	Rungano Nyoni – I Am Not a Witch	
2018	Best Woman Director	Sally Potter – The Party	
2018	Best Woman Director	Lynne Ramsay – You Were Never Really Here	
2018	Best Woman Director	Chloé Zhao – The Rider	
2018	Best Woman Screenwriter	Deborah Davis – The Favourite (WON) (with Tony McNamara)	
2018	Best Woman Screenwriter	Diablo Cody – Tully	
2018	Best Woman Screenwriter	Debra Granik and Anne Rosellini – Leave No Trace	
2018	Best Woman Screenwriter	Nicole Holofcener – Can You Ever Forgive Me? (with Jeff Whitty)	
2018	Best Woman Screenwriter	Tamara Jenkins – Private Life	
2018	Best Woman Screenwriter	Lynne Ramsay – You Were Never Really Here	
2018	Best Woman Screenwriter	Audrey Wells – The Hate U Give	
2018	Best Woman Screenwriter	Chloé Zhao – The Rider	
2018	Best Animated Female	Helen "Elastigirl" Parr in Incredibles 2 – Holly Hunter (WON)	
2018	Best Animated Female	Gwen "Spider-Gwen" Stacy in Spider-Man: Into the Spider-Verse – Hailee Steinfeld	
2018	Best Animated Female	Meechee in Smallfoot – Zendaya	
2018	Best Animated Female	Tracy Walker in Isle of Dogs – Greta Gerwig	
2018	Best Animated Female	Vanellope von Schweetz in Ralph Breaks the Internet – Sarah Silverman	
2018	Best Breakthrough Performance	Thomasin McKenzie – Leave No Trace (WON)	
2018	Best Breakthrough Performance	Yalitza Aparicio – Roma	
2018	Best Breakthrough Performance	Elsie Fisher – Eighth Grade	
2018	Best Breakthrough Performance	KiKi Layne – If Beale Street Could Talk	
2018	Best Breakthrough Performance	Letitia Wright – Black Panther	
2018	Outstanding Achievement by a Woman in the Film Industry	Rachel Morrison for paving the road for women cinematographers with her Oscar nomination for Mudbound and scoring as DP on Black Panther. (WON)	
2018	Outstanding Achievement by a Woman in the Film Industry	82 women who stood on the Palais des Festivals steps at the Cannes Film Festival to protest gender inequality in festival programming.	
2018	Outstanding Achievement by a Woman in the Film Industry	Ava DuVernay for hiring women filmmakers for Queen Sugar and other projects.	
2018	Outstanding Achievement by a Woman in the Film Industry	Megan Ellison for challenging the status quo and producing projects by unique and diverse voices.	
2018	Outstanding Achievement by a Woman in the Film Industry	Nicole Kidman for a banner year of performances in Destroyer, Boy Erased and Aquaman, and for opening opportunity for women in production.	
2018	Outstanding Achievement by a Woman in the Film Industry	Shonda Rhimes, Reese Witherspoon and all the women speaking out in the #MeToo movement.	
2019	Best Woman Director	Céline Sciamma – Portrait of a Lady on Fire (WON)	
2019	Best Woman Director	Greta Gerwig – Little Women	
2019	Best Woman Director	Marielle Heller – A Beautiful Day in the Neighborhood	
2019	Best Woman Director	Lulu Wang – The Farewell	
2019	Best Woman Director	Olivia Wilde – Booksmart	
2019	Best Woman Screenwriter	Greta Gerwig – Little Women (WON)	
2019	Best Woman Screenwriter	Lorene Scafaria – Hustlers	
2019	Best Woman Screenwriter	Céline Sciamma – Portrait of a Lady on Fire	
2019	Best Woman Screenwriter	Lulu Wang – The Farewell	
2019	Best Woman Screenwriter	Olivia Wilde – Booksmart	
2019	Best Animated Female	Bo Peep (Annie Potts) – Toy Story 4 (WON)	
2019	Best Animated Female	Anna (Kristen Bell) – Frozen II	
2019	Best Animated Female	Elsa (Idina Menzel) – Frozen II	
2019	Best Animated Female	Yi (Chloe Bennet) – Abominable	
2019	Best Woman's Breakthrough Performance	Florence Pugh – Midsommar, Little Women, Fighting with My Family (WON)	
2019	Best Woman's Breakthrough Performance	Awkwafina – The Farewell	
2019	Best Woman's Breakthrough Performance	Jodie Turner-Smith – Queen & Slim	
2019	Outstanding Achievement by a Woman in the Film Industry	Ava DuVernay for creating ARRAY and championing women in film (WON)	
2019	Outstanding Achievement by a Woman in the Film Industry	Claire Mathon (cinematographer) — Portrait of a Lady on Fire, Atlantics	
2019	Outstanding Achievement by a Woman in the Film Industry	Anna Serner (Swedish Film Institute) for tireless work on the 5050x2020 initiative	
2020	Best Woman Director	Emerald Fennell – Promising Young Woman (WON)	
2020	Best Woman Director	Eliza Hittman – Never Rarely Sometimes Always	
2020	Best Woman Director	Regina King – One Night in Miami...	
2020	Best Woman Director	Channing Godfrey Peoples – Miss Juneteenth	
2020	Best Woman Director	Kelly Reichardt – First Cow	
2020	Best Woman Director	Chloé Zhao – Nomadland	
2020	Best Woman Screenwriter	Radha Blank – The Forty-Year-Old Version (WON)	
2020	Best Woman Screenwriter	Emerald Fennell – Promising Young Woman	
2020	Best Woman Screenwriter	Eliza Hittman – Never Rarely Sometimes Always	
2020	Best Woman Screenwriter	Chloé Zhao – Nomadland	
2020	Best Animated Female	22 (Tina Fey) – Soul (WON)	
2020	Best Animated Female	Mebh Óg MacTíre (Eva Whittaker) – Wolfwalkers	
2020	Best Animated Female	Robyn Goodfellowe (Honor Kneafsey) – Wolfwalkers	
2020	Best Woman's Breakthrough Performance	Sidney Flanigan – Never Rarely Sometimes Always (WON)	
2020	Best Woman's Breakthrough Performance	Radha Blank – The Forty-Year-Old Version	
2020	Best Woman's Breakthrough Performance	Helena Zengel – News of the World	
2020	Outstanding Achievement by a Woman in the Film Industry	all indie female writers and directors who normalized abortion as a vital element in the cultural conversation in films such as Saint Frances, Never Rarely Sometimes Always, Sister of the Groom, Once Upon a River, The Glorias, and others (WON)	
2020	Outstanding Achievement by a Woman in the Film Industry	Emerald Fennell for creating Promising Young Woman	
2020	Outstanding Achievement by a Woman in the Film Industry	all female heads of film festivals who successfully transitioned from live to online events to sustain festival culture through the pandemic	
2020	Outstanding Achievement by a Woman in the Film Industry	Sophia Loren for a brilliant comeback at age 86 in The Life Ahead	
2021	Best Woman Director	Jane Campion – The Power of the Dog (WON)	
2021	Best Woman Director	Julia Ducournau – Titane	
2021	Best Woman Director	Maggie Gyllenhaal – The Lost Daughter	
2021	Best Woman Director	Rebecca Hall – Passing	
2021	Best Woman Director	Sian Heder – CODA	
2021	Best Woman Screenwriter	Jane Campion – The Power of the Dog (WON)	
2021	Best Woman Screenwriter	Maggie Gyllenhaal – The Lost Daughter	
2021	Best Woman Screenwriter	Rebecca Hall – Passing	
2021	Best Woman Screenwriter	Sian Heder – CODA	
2021	Best Woman Screenwriter	Maria Schrader – I'm Your Man	
2021	Best Animated Female	Mirabel, Stephanie Beatriz in Encanto (WON)	
2021	Best Animated Female	Katie, Abbi Jacobson in The Mitchells vs. the Machines	
2021	Best Animated Female	Raya, Kelly Marie Tran in Raya and the Last Dragon	
2021	Best Animated Female	Giulia, Emma Berman in Luca	
2021	Best Animated Female	Sisu, Awkwafina in Raya and the Last Dragon	
2021	Best Woman's Breakthrough Performance	Emilia Jones in CODA (WON)	
2021	Best Woman's Breakthrough Performance	Ariana DeBose in West Side Story	
2021	Best Woman's Breakthrough Performance	Alana Haim in Licorice Pizza	
2021	Best Woman's Breakthrough Performance	Renate Reinsve in The Worst Person in the World	
2021	Best Woman's Breakthrough Performance	Rachel Zegler in West Side Story	
2021	Outstanding Achievement by A Woman in The Film Industry	Maya Cade for establishing the Black Film Archive (WON)	
2021	Outstanding Achievement by A Woman in The Film Industry	Victoria Alonso for her achievements at Marvel Studios	
2021	Outstanding Achievement by A Woman in The Film Industry	Anna Serner for 20 years of female forward work at the Swedish Film Institute	
2022	Best Woman Director	Gina Prince-Bythewood – The Woman King (WON)	
2022	Best Woman Director	Chinonye Chukwu – Till	
2022	Best Woman Director	Marie Kreutzer – Corsage	
2022	Best Woman Director	Sarah Polley – Women Talking	
2022	Best Woman Director	Maria Schrader – She Said	
2022	Best Woman Director	Charlotte Wells – Aftersun	
2022	Best Woman Screenwriter	Sarah Polley and Miriam Toews – Women Talking (WON)	
2022	Best Woman Screenwriter	Alice Birch – The Wonder asn Mothering Sunday	
2022	Best Woman Screenwriter	Rebecca Lenkiewicz – She Said	
2022	Best Woman Screenwriter	Domee Shi – Turning Red	
2022	Best Woman Screenwriter	Dana Stevens and Maria Bello – The Woman King	
2022	Best Woman Screenwriter	Charlotte Wells – Aftersun	
2022	Best Animated Female	Connie, Isabella Rossellini – Marcel the Shell with Shoes On (WON)	
2022	Best Animated Female	Izzy, Keke Palmer – Lightyear	
2022	Best Animated Female	Kat, Lyric Ross – Wendell & Wild	
2022	Best Animated Female	"Kitty Softpaws", Salma Hayek – Puss in Boots: Last Wish	
2022	Best Animated Female	Mei, Rosalie Chiang – Turning Red	
2022	Best Animated Female	Ming, Sandra Oh – Turning Red	
2022	Best Woman's Breakthrough Performance	Danielle Deadwyler – Till (WON)	
2022	Best Woman's Breakthrough Performance	Frankie Corio – Aftersun	
2022	Best Woman's Breakthrough Performance	Stephanie Hsu – Everything Everywhere All at Once	
2022	Best Woman's Breakthrough Performance	Thuso Mbedu – The Woman King	
2022	Best Woman's Breakthrough Performance	Amber Midthunder – Prey	
2022	Best Woman's Breakthrough Performance	Sadie Sink – The Whale	
2022	Outstanding Achievement by a Woman in the Film Industry	Viola Davis – For getting The Woman King made as her lifetime passion project and creating opportunities for other women creatives (WON)	
2022	Outstanding Achievement by a Woman in the Film Industry	Nina Menkes and Maria Giese – For making Brainwashed, analyzing and illustrating the misogynistic representation of women in Hollywood movies	
2022	Outstanding Achievement by a Woman in the Film Industry	Domee Shi – For being the first woman to direct a film for Pixar and for becoming Pixar's VP of Creative	
2022	Outstanding Achievement by a Woman in the Film Industry	Jacqueline Stewart – For ongoing advocacy of the underrepresented and becoming president of the Academy Museum of Motion Pictures	
2022	Outstanding Achievement by a Woman in the Film Industry	Michelle Yeoh – Lifetime Achievement Award	
2023	Best Woman Director	Justine Triet – Anatomy of a Fall (WON)	
2023	Best Woman Director	Ava DuVernay – Origin	
2023	Best Woman Director	Emerald Fennell – Saltburn	
2023	Best Woman Director	Greta Gerwig – Barbie	
2023	Best Woman Director	Celine Song – Past Lives	
2023	Best Woman Screenwriter	Celine Song – Past Lives (WON)	
2023	Best Woman Screenwriter	Samy Burch – May December	
2023	Best Woman Screenwriter	Emerald Fennell – Saltburn	
2023	Best Woman Screenwriter	Greta Gerwig (with Noah Baumbach) – Barbie	
2023	Best Woman Screenwriter	Justine Triet (with Arthur Harari) – Anatomy of a Fall	
2023	Best Animated Female	Gwen "Spider-Gwen" Stacy, Hailee Steinfeld in Spider-Man: Across the Spider-Verse	
2023	Best Animated Female	Asha, Ariana DeBose – Wish	
2023	Best Animated Female	April O'Neil, Ayo Edebiri – Teenage Mutant Ninja Turtles: Mutant Mayhem	
2023	Best Animated Female	Ember Lumen, Leah Lewis – Elemental	
2023	Best Animated Female	Nimona, Chloë Grace Moretz – Nimona	
2023	Best Woman's Breakthrough Performance	Lily Gladstone – Killers of the Flower Moon (WON)	
2023	Best Woman's Breakthrough Performance	Abby Ryder Fortson – Are You There God? It's Me, Margaret.	
2023	Best Woman's Breakthrough Performance	Greta Lee – Past Lives	
2023	Best Woman's Breakthrough Performance	Da'Vine Joy Randolph – The Holdovers	
2023	Best Woman's Breakthrough Performance	Cailee Spaeny – Priscilla	
2023	Outstanding Achievement by a Woman in the Film Industry	Fran Drescher – for leading SAG-AFTRA through the actors' strike and standing strong for an equitable contract. (WON)	
2023	Outstanding Achievement by a Woman in the Film Industry	Ava DuVernay – For creating a new financing model, for consistently supporting women in film and for focusing her work on social justice.	
2023	Outstanding Achievement by a Woman in the Film Industry	Greta Gerwig – For all that is Barbie.	
2023	Outstanding Achievement by a Woman in the Film Industry	Lily Gladstone – For championing Native American stories, advocating for diversity and authenticity, and for starring in two exceptional films in 2023.	
2023	Outstanding Achievement by a Woman in the Film Industry	Margot Robbie – For producing and starring in Barbie, and for continued support for women in film via her LuckyChap production company.	
2024	Best Woman Director	Coralie Fargeat – The Substance (WON/TIE)	
2024	Best Woman Director	Payal Kapadia – All We Imagine as Light (WON/TIE)	
2024	Best Woman Director	Andrea Arnold – Bird	
2024	Best Woman Director	Gia Coppola – The Last Showgirl	
2024	Best Woman Director	Megan Park – My Old Ass	
2024	Best Woman Director	Alice Rohrwacher – La chimera	
2024	Best Female Screenwriter	Coralie Fargeat – The Substance (WON/TIE)	
2024	Best Female Screenwriter	Payal Kapadia – All We Imagine as Light (WON/TIE)	
2024	Best Female Screenwriter	Andrea Arnold – Bird	
2024	Best Female Screenwriter	Megan Park – My Old Ass	
2024	Best Female Screenwriter	Alice Rohrwacher – La chimera	
2024	Best Female Screenwriter	Erica Tremblay & Miciana Alice – Fancy Dance	
2024	Best Animated/Voiced Performance	Lupita Nyong'o – The Wild Robot (WON)	
2024	Best Animated/Voiced Performance	Maya Hawke – Inside Out 2	
2024	Best Animated/Voiced Performance	Ayo Edebiri – Inside Out 2	
2024	Best Animated/Voiced Performance	Amy Poehler – Inside Out 2	
2024	Best Animated/Voiced Performance	Sarah Snook – Memoir of a Snail	
2024	Best Animated/Voiced Performance	Jacki Weaver – Memoir of a Snail	
2024	Best Women's Breakthrough Performance	Mikey Madison – Anora (WON)	
2024	Best Women's Breakthrough Performance	Karla Sofía Gascón – Emilia Pérez	
2024	Best Women's Breakthrough Performance	Nykiya Adams – Bird	
2024	Best Women's Breakthrough Performance	Katy O'Brian – Love Lies Bleeding	
2024	Best Women's Breakthrough Performance	June Squibb – Thelma	
2024	Best Women's Breakthrough Performance	Maisy Stella – My Old Ass	
2024	Best Stunt Performance	June Squibb – Thelma (WON)	
2024	Best Stunt Performance	Alex Jay (for Zendaya) – Dune: Part Two	
2024	Best Stunt Performance	Hayle Wright (for Anya Taylor-Joy) – Furiosa: A Mad Max Saga	
2024	Best Stunt Performance	Katy O'Brian – Love Lies Bleeding	
2024	Best Stunt Performance	Cailee Spaeny – Alien: Romulus	
2024	Best Stunt Performance	Nikki Berwick (stunt coordinator) – Gladiator II	
2025	Best Woman Director	Chloé Zhao – Hamnet (WON)	
2025	Best Woman Director	Mary Bronstein – If I Had Legs I'd Kick You	
2025	Best Woman Director	Mona Fastvold – The Testament of Ann Lee	
2025	Best Woman Director	Eva Victor – Sorry, Baby	
2025	Best Woman Director	Kathryn Bigelow – A House of Dynamite	
2025	Best Female Screenwriter	Eva Victor – Sorry, Baby (WON)	
2025	Best Female Screenwriter	Nia DaCosta – Hedda	
2025	Best Female Screenwriter	Hikari and Stephen Blahut – Rental Family	
2025	Best Female Screenwriter	Mary Bronstein – If I Had Legs I'd Kick You	
2025	Best Female Screenwriter	Chloé Zhao and Maggie O'Farrell – Hamnet	
2025	Best Animated/Voiced Performance	Arden Cho – KPop Demon Hunters (WON)	
2025	Best Animated/Voiced Performance	Loïse Charpentier – Little Amélie or the Character of Rain	
2025	Best Animated/Voiced Performance	Ginnifer Goodwin – Zootopia 2	
2025	Best Animated/Voiced Performance	Fortune Feimster – Zootopia 2	
2025	Best Animated/Voiced Performance	Zoë Saldaña – Elio	
2025	Best Women's Breakthrough Performance	Chase Infiniti – One Battle After Another (WON)	
2025	Best Women's Breakthrough Performance	Odessa A'zion – Marty Supreme	
2025	Best Women's Breakthrough Performance	Teyana Taylor – One Battle After Another	
2025	Best Women's Breakthrough Performance	Wunmi Mosaku – Sinners	
2025	Best Women's Breakthrough Performance	Eva Victor – Sorry, Baby	
2025	Best Stunt Performance	Chase Infiniti – One Battle After Another (WON)	
2025	Best Stunt Performance	Hayley Atwell – Mission: Impossible – The Final Reckoning	
2025	Best Stunt Performance	Ana de Armas – Ballerina	
2025	Best Stunt Performance	Teyana Taylor – One Battle After Another	
2025	Best Stunt Performance	Pom Klementieff – Mission: Impossible – The Final Reckoning	

=== EDA Special Mention Awards ===
Table key
(WON)	Indicates the winner

Year	Category	Nominee	Ref.
2007	AWFJ Hall of Shame Award	Norbit (WON)	
2007	AWFJ Hall of Shame Award	Beowulf	
2007	AWFJ Hall of Shame Award	Black Snake Moan	
2007	AWFJ Hall of Shame Award	The Nanny Diaries	
2007	AWFJ Hall of Shame Award	Wild Hogs	
2007	Actress Most in Need of a New Agent	Hilary Swank (WON)	
2007	Actress Most in Need of a New Agent	Halle Berry	
2007	Actress Most in Need of a New Agent	Nicole Kidman	
2007	Actress Most in Need of a New Agent	Catherine Zeta-Jones	
2007	Movie You Wanted to Love But Just Couldn't	Margot at the Wedding (WON)	
2007	Movie You Wanted to Love But Just Couldn't	Evening	
2007	Movie You Wanted to Love But Just Couldn't	Georgia Rule	
2007	Movie You Wanted to Love But Just Couldn't	Reservation Road	
2007	Best of the Fests	4 Months, 3 Weeks and 2 Days (WON)	
2007	Best of the Fests	Black Sheep (special mention)	
2007	Best of the Fests	Four Sheets to the Wind (special mention)	
2007	Best of the Fests	Grbavica: Land of My Dreams (special mention)	
2007	Best of the Fests	Never Forever (special mention)	
2007	Best of the Fests	Red Road (special mention)	
2007	Best of the Fests	Secret Sunshine (special mention)	
2007	Best of the Fests	Angel	
2007	Best of the Fests	The Cake Eaters	
2007	Best of the Fests	Darius Goes West: The Roll of his Life	
2007	Best of the Fests	Day Zero	
2007	Best of the Fests	Out of Time	
2007	Best of the Fests	Sweet Mud	
2007	Unforgettable Moment Award	Eastern Promises – Viggo Mortensen's full frontal (WON)	
2007	Unforgettable Moment Award	The Host – Tracking shot of monsters appearing	
2007	Unforgettable Moment Award	Golden Door – Emigrants swimming in milk	
2007	Unforgettable Moment Award	Into the Wild – Emile Hirsch's dying scene	
2007	Best Depiction of Nudity or Sexuality	Eastern Promises – Viggo Mortensen (WON)	
2007	Best Depiction of Nudity or Sexuality	Atonement – Keira Knightley	
2007	Best Depiction of Nudity or Sexuality	Before the Devil Knows You're Dead – Marisa Tomei/Philip Seymour Hoffman	
2007	Best Depiction of Nudity or Sexuality	Lust, Caution – Tang Wei	
2007	Best Seduction	Atonement – Keira Knightley and James McAvoy (WON) (TIE)	
2007	Best Seduction	The Namesake – Tabu and Irrfan Khan (WON) (TIE)	
2007	Best Seduction	Juno – Elliot Page and Michael Cera	
2007	Best Seduction	Waitress – Keri Russell and Nathan Fillion	
2007	Sequel That Shouldn't Have Been Made Award	Shrek the Third (WON)	
2007	Sequel That Shouldn't Have Been Made Award	Pirates of the Caribbean: At World's End	
2007	Sequel That Shouldn't Have Been Made Award	Rush Hour 3	
2007	Sequel That Shouldn't Have Been Made Award	Spider-Man 3	
2007	Cultural Crossover Award	Persepolis (WON)	
2007	Cultural Crossover Award	The Namesake	
2007	Cultural Crossover Award	Killer of Sheep	
2007	Bravest Performance Award	Julie Christe – Away from Her (WON)	
2007	Bravest Performance Award	Kate Dickie – Red Road	
2007	Bravest Performance Award	Jodie Foster – The Brave One	
2007	Best Leap from Actress to Director Award	Sarah Polley (WON)	
2007	Best Leap from Actress to Director Award	Kasi Lemmons	
2007	Best Leap from Actress to Director Award	Julie Delpy	
2007	Best Leap from Actress to Director Award	Adrienne Shelly	
2007	Most Egregious Age Difference between Leading Man and Love Interest Award	Robin Wright Penn (b. 1966) and Anthony Hopkins (b. 1937) – Beowulf (WON)	
2007	Most Egregious Age Difference between Leading Man and Love Interest Award	Téa Leoni (b. 1966) and Ben Kingsley (b. 1943) – You Kill Me	
2008	AWFJ Hall of Shame Award	27 Dresses (WON)	
2008	AWFJ Hall of Shame Award	Choke	
2008	AWFJ Hall of Shame Award	The House Bunny	
2008	AWFJ Hall of Shame Award	My Blueberry Nights	
2008	Actress Most in Need of a New Agent	Kate Hudson (WON)	
2008	Actress Most in Need of a New Agent	Diane Keaton	
2008	Actress Most in Need of a New Agent	Nicole Kidman	
2008	Movie You Wanted to Love But Just Couldn't	Mamma Mia! (WON) (TIE)	
2008	Movie You Wanted to Love But Just Couldn't	The Women (WON) (TIE)	
2008	Movie You Wanted to Love But Just Couldn't	Mad Money	
2008	Best of the Fests	Hunger (WON)	
2008	Best of the Fests	Cook County	
2008	Best of the Fests	The Hurt Locker	
2008	Best of the Fests	Moving Midway	
2008	Unforgettable Moment Award	The Dark Knight – Joker's first scene (WON) (TIE)	
2008	Unforgettable Moment Award	Slumdog Millionaire – Young Jamal jumps into the poop (WON) (TIE)	
2008	Unforgettable Moment Award	Doubt – Viola Davis' scenes	
2008	Unforgettable Moment Award	Slumdog Millionaire – Eye gouging	
2008	Unforgettable Moment Award	Standard Operating Procedure – Sabrina Harman interview	
2008	Unforgettable Moment Award	The Wrestler – Mickey Rourke getting stapled	
2008	Best Depiction of Nudity or Sexuality	Elegy (WON) (TIE)	
2008	Best Depiction of Nudity or Sexuality	The Reader (WON) (TIE)	
2008	Best Depiction of Nudity or Sexuality	The Wrestler	
2008	Best Seduction	Vicky Cristina Barcelona (WON)	
2008	Best Seduction	Happy-Go-Lucky	
2008	Best Seduction	The Visitor	
2008	Sequel That Shouldn't Have Been Made Award	Indiana Jones and the Kingdom of the Crystal Skull (WON) (TIE)	
2008	Sequel That Shouldn't Have Been Made Award	Saw V (WON) (TIE)	
2008	Sequel That Shouldn't Have Been Made Award	Step Up 2: The Streets	
2008	Remake That Shouldn't Have Been Made Award	The Women (WON)	
2008	Remake That Shouldn't Have Been Made Award	Death Race	
2008	Remake That Shouldn't Have Been Made Award	The Incredible Hulk	
2008	Cultural Crossover Award	Slumdog Millionaire (WON)	
2008	Cultural Crossover Award	The Reader	
2008	Cultural Crossover Award	Waltz with Bashir	
2008	Bravest Performance Award	Mickey Rourke – The Wrestler (WON)	
2008	Bravest Performance Award	Melissa Leo – Frozen River	
2008	Bravest Performance Award	Kate Winslet – The Reader	
2008	Best Leap from Actress to Director Award	Helen Hunt – Then She Found Me (WON)	
2008	Best Leap from Actress to Director Award	Greta Gerwig – Nights and Weekends	
2008	Best Leap from Actress to Director Award	Amy Redford – The Guitar	
2008	Most Egregious Age Difference between Leading Man and Love Interest Award	The Wackness – Ben Kingsley (b. 1943) and Mary-Kate Olsen (b. 1986) (WON)	
2008	Most Egregious Age Difference between Leading Man and Love Interest Award	88 Minutes – Al Pacino (b. 1940) and Alicia Witt (b. 1975)	
2008	Most Egregious Age Difference between Leading Man and Love Interest Award	Righteous Kill – Robert De Niro (b. 1943) and Carla Gugino (b. 1971)	
2009	AWFJ Hall of Shame Award	Robert Luketic – The Ugly Truth (WON)	
2009	AWFJ Hall of Shame Award	Lars von Trier – Antichrist	
2009	AWFJ Hall of Shame Award	Jody Hill – Observe and Report	
2009	Actress Most in Need of a New Agent	Hilary Swank (WON)	
2009	Actress Most in Need of a New Agent	Megan Fox	
2009	Actress Most in Need of a New Agent	Katherine Heigl	
2009	Movie You Wanted to Love But Just Couldn't	Amelia (WON)	
2009	Movie You Wanted to Love But Just Couldn't	The Imaginarium of Doctor Parnassus	
2009	Movie You Wanted to Love But Just Couldn't	Precious	
2009	Unforgettable Moment Award	Inglourious Basterds – Shoshanna (Mélanie Laurent) burns down the theater. (WON)	
2009	Unforgettable Moment Award	Precious – Mary (Mo'Nique) admits the truth about abuse.	
2009	Unforgettable Moment Award	Zombieland – Surprise celebrity cameo (no spoilers here)	
2009	Best Depiction of Nudity, Sexuality, or Seduction	An Education – Carey Mulligan and Peter Sarsgaard (WON) (TIE)	
2009	Best Depiction of Nudity, Sexuality, or Seduction	It's Complicated – Meryl Streep and Alec Baldwin (WON) (TIE)	
2009	Best Depiction of Nudity, Sexuality, or Seduction	Bright Star – Abbie Cornish and Ben Whishaw	
2009	Sequel That Shouldn't Have Been Made Award	Transformers: Revenge of the Fallen (WON)	
2009	Sequel That Shouldn't Have Been Made Award	Night at the Museum: Battle of the Smithsonian	
2009	Sequel That Shouldn't Have Been Made Award	Terminator Salvation	
2009	Cultural Crossover Award	District 9 (WON)	
2009	Cultural Crossover Award	Amreeka	
2009	Cultural Crossover Award	The Stoning of Soraya M.	
2009	Bravest Performance Award	Mo'Nique – Precious (WON)	
2009	Bravest Performance Award	Charlotte Gainsbourg – Antichrist	
2009	Bravest Performance Award	Gabourey Sidibe – Precious	
2009	Most Egregious Age Difference between Leading Man and Love Interest Award	Larry David and Evan Rachel Wood – Whatever Works (40 years) (WON)	
2009	Most Egregious Age Difference between Leading Man and Love Interest Award	Jeff Bridges and Maggie Gyllenhaal – Crazy Heart (28 years)	
2009	Most Egregious Age Difference between Leading Man and Love Interest Award	Kevin James and Jayma Mays – Paul Blart: Mall Cop (14 years)	
2010	AWFJ Hall of Shame Award	Sex and the City 2, Michael Patrick King, Sarah Jessica Parker, cast and crew (WON)	
2010	AWFJ Hall of Shame Award	Jackass 3D	
2010	AWFJ Hall of Shame Award	Jonah Hex	
2010	AWFJ Hall of Shame Award	Mel Gibson	
2010	AWFJ Hall of Shame Award	Valentine's Day and Garry Marshall	
2010	Actress Most in Need of a New Agent	Jennifer Aniston (WON)	
2010	Actress Most in Need of a New Agent	Halle Berry	
2010	Actress Most in Need of a New Agent	Katherine Heigl	
2010	Actress Most in Need of a New Agent	Sarah Jessica Parker	
2010	Actress Most in Need of a New Agent	Reese Witherspoon	
2010	Movie You Wanted to Love But Just Couldn't	For Colored Girls (WON)	
2010	Movie You Wanted to Love But Just Couldn't	Black Swan	
2010	Movie You Wanted to Love But Just Couldn't	Conviction	
2010	Movie You Wanted to Love But Just Couldn't	Inception	
2010	Movie You Wanted to Love But Just Couldn't	The Social Network	
2010	Movie You Wanted to Love But Just Couldn't	Waiting for "Superman"	
2010	Unforgettable Moment Award	Black Swan – Nina Sayers (Natalie Portman) sprouts black wings and final dance performance. (WON)	
2010	Unforgettable Moment Award	127 Hours – Aron Ralston (James Franco) cuts off his arm.	
2010	Unforgettable Moment Award	Inception – Paris folds in on itself.	
2010	Unforgettable Moment Award	The Kids Are All Right – Nic (Annette Bening) finds out that Jules (Julianne Moore) is cheating.	
2010	Unforgettable Moment Award	Winter's Bone – Ree Dolly (Jennifer Lawrence) cuts off her dead father's hands with a chain saw.	
2010	Best Depiction of Nudity, Sexuality, or Seduction	The Kids Are All Right (WON)	
2010	Best Depiction of Nudity, Sexuality, or Seduction	Black Swan	
2010	Best Depiction of Nudity, Sexuality, or Seduction	Blue Valentine	
2010	Best Depiction of Nudity, Sexuality, or Seduction	I Am Love	
2010	Sequel That Shouldn't Have Been Made Award	Sex and the City 2 (WON)	
2010	Sequel That Shouldn't Have Been Made Award	Iron Man 2	
2010	Sequel That Shouldn't Have Been Made Award	Little Fockers	
2010	Sequel That Shouldn't Have Been Made Award	Tron: Legacy	
2010	Sequel That Shouldn't Have Been Made Award	Wall Street: Money Never Sleeps	
2010	The Remake That Shouldn't Have Been Made Award	Clash of the Titans (WON)	
2010	The Remake That Shouldn't Have Been Made Award	The A-Team	
2010	The Remake That Shouldn't Have Been Made Award	Death at a Funeral	
2010	The Remake That Shouldn't Have Been Made Award	Let Me In	
2010	The Remake That Shouldn't Have Been Made Award	Robin Hood	
2010	Cultural Crossover Award	The Kids Are All Right (WON)	
2010	Cultural Crossover Award	Four Lions	
2010	Cultural Crossover Award	Girl with the Dragon Tattoo (2009)	
2010	Cultural Crossover Award	Mother	
2010	Cultural Crossover Award	Waste Land	
2010	Bravest Performance Award	Natalie Portman – Black Swan (WON)	
2010	Bravest Performance Award	Annette Bening and Juliane Moore – The Kids Are All Right	
2010	Bravest Performance Award	James Franco – 127 Hours	
2010	Bravest Performance Award	Chloë Grace Moretz – Kick-Ass	
2010	Bravest Performance Award	Paprika Steen – Applause	
2010	Most Egregious Age Difference between Leading Man and Love Interest Award	Solitary Man – Michael Douglas and Imogen Poots (45 years) (WON)	
2010	Most Egregious Age Difference between Leading Man and Love Interest Award	Barney's Version – Paul Giamatti and Rosamund Pike (12 years)	
2010	Most Egregious Age Difference between Leading Man and Love Interest Award	The Company Men – Tommy Lee Jones and Maria Bello (21 years)	
2010	Most Egregious Age Difference between Leading Man and Love Interest Award	Machete – Danny Trejo and Jessica Alba (37 years)	
2010	Most Egregious Age Difference between Leading Man and Love Interest Award	You Will Meet A Tall Dark Stranger – Anthony Hopkins and Lucy Punch (40 years)	
2011	AWFJ Hall of Shame Award	The Hollywood Reporter for failing to invite any women to join the Directors Roundtable (WON)	
2011	AWFJ Hall of Shame Award	I Melt with You	
2011	AWFJ Hall of Shame Award	Jack and Jill	
2011	AWFJ Hall of Shame Award	Something Borrowed	
2011	AWFJ Hall of Shame Award	Sucker Punch	
2011	Actress Most in Need of a New Agent	All actresses in New Year's Eve (WON)	
2011	Actress Most in Need of a New Agent	Jennifer Aniston	
2011	Actress Most in Need of a New Agent	Kate Hudson	
2011	Actress Most in Need of a New Agent	Sarah Jessica Parker	
2011	Actress Most in Need of a New Agent	Amanda Seyfried	
2011	Movie You Wanted to Love But Just Couldn't	Tinker Tailor Soldier Spy (WON)	
2011	Movie You Wanted to Love But Just Couldn't	Drive	
2011	Movie You Wanted to Love But Just Couldn't	The Future	
2011	Movie You Wanted to Love But Just Couldn't	Sucker Punch	
2011	Movie You Wanted to Love But Just Couldn't	Young Adult	
2011	Unforgettable Moment Award	The Artist – The sound of glass clinking on the table (WON)	
2011	Unforgettable Moment Award	Drive – The elevator scene	
2011	Unforgettable Moment Award	The Girl with the Dragon Tattoo (2011) – Lisbeth's revenge	
2011	Unforgettable Moment Award	The Help – The pie scene	
2011	Unforgettable Moment Award	Shame – Carey Mulligan singing New York	
2011	Best Depiction of Nudity, Sexuality, or Seduction	Melancholia – Justine in the moonlight (WON) (TIE)	
2011	Best Depiction of Nudity, Sexuality, or Seduction	Shame – Opening sequence on the subway train (WON) (TIE)	
2011	Best Depiction of Nudity, Sexuality, or Seduction	A Dangerous Method – Carl Jung spanks Sabina Speilrein	
2011	Best Depiction of Nudity, Sexuality, or Seduction	The Girl with the Dragon Tattoo (2011) – Lisbeth mounts Mikael	
2011	Best Depiction of Nudity, Sexuality, or Seduction	Shame – Brandon with co-worker	
2011	Sequel or Remake That Shouldn't Have Been Made Award	The Hangover Part II (WON)	
2011	Sequel or Remake That Shouldn't Have Been Made Award	Arthur	
2011	Sequel or Remake That Shouldn't Have Been Made Award	Cars 2	
2011	Sequel or Remake That Shouldn't Have Been Made Award	Hoodwinked Too! Hood vs. Evil	
2011	Sequel or Remake That Shouldn't Have Been Made Award	Transformers: Dark of the Moon	
2011	Most Egregious Age Difference	Albert Nobbs – Glenn Close (64) and Mia Wasikowska (22) (WON) (TIE)	
2011	Most Egregious Age Difference	The Twilight Saga: Breaking Dawn – Part 1 – Bella (18) and Edward (over 100) (WON) (TIE)	
2011	Most Egregious Age Difference	The Girl with the Dragon Tattoo (2011) – Daniel Craig (43) and Rooney Mara (26)	
2011	Most Egregious Age Difference	Midnight in Paris – Owen Wilson (43) and Léa Seydoux (26)	
2011	Most Egregious Age Difference	Sleeping Beauty – Emily Browning (23) and Man 1 (Peter Carroll, 68), Man 2 (Chris Haywood, 63), and Man 3 (Hugh Keays-Byrne, 64)	
2012	AWFJ Hall of Shame Award	Sean Anders – That's My Boy (WON)	
2012	AWFJ Hall of Shame Award	Sacha Baron Cohen – The Dictator	
2012	AWFJ Hall of Shame Award	Gabriele Muccino – Playing for Keeps	
2012	Actress Most in Need of a New Agent	Katherine Heigl – One for the Money (WON) (TIE)	
2012	Actress Most in Need of a New Agent	Reese Witherspoon – This Means War (WON) (TIE)	
2012	Actress Most in Need of a New Agent	Nicole Kidman – The Paperboy	
2012	Movie You Wanted to Love But Just Couldn't	Anna Karenina (WON)	
2012	Movie You Wanted to Love But Just Couldn't	Cloud Atlas	
2012	Movie You Wanted to Love But Just Couldn't	Les Misérables	
2012	Unforgettable Moment Award	Les Misérables – Anne Hathaway as Fantine sings I Dreamed a Dream (WON) (TIE)	
2012	Unforgettable Moment Award	Zero Dark Thirty – Jessica Chastain as Maya says, I'm the mother… (WON) (TIE)	
2012	Unforgettable Moment Award	Argo – The runway chase.	
2012	Unforgettable Moment Award	Flight – Crash sequence	
2012	Unforgettable Moment Award	Rust and Bone – Marion Cotillard as Stephanie dances in the wheelchair.	
2012	Best Depiction of Nudity, Sexuality, or Seduction	The Sessions – Helen Hunt and John Hawkes (WON)	
2012	Best Depiction of Nudity, Sexuality, or Seduction	Anna Karenina – Keira Knightley and Aaron Taylor-Johnson	
2012	Best Depiction of Nudity, Sexuality, or Seduction	Rust and Bone – Marion Cotilliard	
2012	Sequel or Remake That Shouldn't Have Been Made Award	Red Dawn (WON) (TIE)	
2012	Sequel or Remake That Shouldn't Have Been Made Award	Total Recall (WON) (TIE)	
2012	Sequel or Remake That Shouldn't Have Been Made Award	The Amazing Spider-Man	
2012	Most Egregious Age Difference Between The Leading Man and The Love Interest Award	Flight – Denzel Washington (b. 1954) and Kelly Reilly (b. 1977)... and Nadine Velazquez (b. 1978) (WON)	
2012	Most Egregious Age Difference Between The Leading Man and The Love Interest Award	Seeking a Friend for the End of the World – Steve Carell (b. 1962) and Keira Knightley (b. 1985)	
2012	Most Egregious Age Difference Between The Leading Man and The Love Interest Award	Silver Linings Playbook – Bradley Cooper (b. 1975) and Jennifer Lawrence (b. 1990)	
2013	AWFJ Hall of Shame Award	The Counselor – Ridley Scott (WON)	
2013	AWFJ Hall of Shame Award	Grown Ups 2 – Dennis Dugan	
2013	AWFJ Hall of Shame Award	Movie 43 – Elizabeth Banks, Steven Brill, Steve Carr, Rusty Cundieff, James Duffy, Griffin Dunne, Peter Farrelly, Patrik Forsberg, Will Graham, James Gunn, Brett Ratner, Jonathan van Tulleken, and Bob Odenkirk	
2013	Actress Most in Need of a New Agent	Cameron Diaz – for The Counselor (WON)	
2013	Actress Most in Need of a New Agent	Selena Gomez, Vanessa Hudgens, Ashley Benson, and Rachel Korine – for Spring Breakers	
2013	Actress Most in Need of a New Agent	Melissa McCarthy – for Identity Thief and The Heat	
2013	Movie You Wanted to Love But Just Couldn't	The Counselor (WON)	
2013	Movie You Wanted to Love But Just Couldn't	All Is Lost	
2013	Movie You Wanted to Love But Just Couldn't	Blue Is the Warmest Color	
2013	Unforgettable Moment Award	12 Years a Slave – Solomon Northup hanging (WON)	
2013	Unforgettable Moment Award	12 Years a Slave – Patsy pleads for soap	
2013	Unforgettable Moment Award	Gravity – George Clooney reappears	
2013	Unforgettable Moment Award	Her – Phone sex sequences	
2013	Unforgettable Moment Award	Nebraska – That's not my air compressor	
2013	Best Depiction of Nudity, Sexuality, or Seduction	Her – Scarlett Johansson and Joaquin Phoenix for their digital lovemaking (WON)	
2013	Best Depiction of Nudity, Sexuality, or Seduction	Blue Is The Warmest Color – Léa Seydoux and Adèle Exarchopoulos	
2013	Best Depiction of Nudity, Sexuality, or Seduction	The Spectacular Now – Shailene Woodley and Miles Teller	
2013	Sequel or Remake That Shouldn't Have Been Made Award	Carrie (WON) (TIE)	
2013	Sequel or Remake That Shouldn't Have Been Made Award	Oz the Great and Powerful (WON) (TIE)	
2013	Sequel or Remake That Shouldn't Have Been Made Award	Grown Ups 2	
2013	Sequel or Remake That Shouldn't Have Been Made Award	The Hangover Part III	
2013	Sequel or Remake That Shouldn't Have Been Made Award	Kick-Ass 2	
2013	Most Egregious Age Difference between the Leading Man and the Love Interest Award	Last Vegas – Michael Douglas (b. 1944) and Bre Blair (b. 1980) (WON)	
2013	Most Egregious Age Difference between the Leading Man and the Love Interest Award	August: Osage County – Dermot Mulroney (b. 1963) and Abigail Breslin (b. 1996)	
2013	Most Egregious Age Difference between the Leading Man and the Love Interest Award	The Invisible Woman – Ralph Fiennes (b. 1962) and Felicity Jones (b. 1983)	
2013	Most Egregious Age Difference between the Leading Man and the Love Interest Award	The Lifeguard – Kristen Bell (b. 1980) and David Lambert (b. 1993) (unusually, a pairing with an older woman)	
2013	Most Egregious Age Difference between the Leading Man and the Love Interest Award	Oblivion – Tom Cruise (b. 1962) and Andrea Riseborough (b. 1981)/Olga Kurylenko (b. 1979)	
2014	Actress Most in Need of a New Agent	Cameron Diaz – Annie, The Other Woman, Sex Tape (WON)	
2014	Actress Most in Need of a New Agent	Jennifer Aniston – Horrible Bosses 2	
2014	Actress Most in Need of a New Agent	Melissa McCarthy – Tammy	
2014	Movie You Wanted to Love But Just Couldn't	Inherent Vice (WON)	
2014	Movie You Wanted to Love But Just Couldn't	Foxcatcher	
2014	Movie You Wanted to Love But Just Couldn't	Unbroken	
2014	Best Depiction of Nudity, Sexuality, or Seduction	Under the Skin – Scarlett Johansson (WON)	
2014	Best Depiction of Nudity, Sexuality, or Seduction	Gone Girl – Rosamund Pike, Ben Affleck, and Neil Patrick Harris	
2014	Best Depiction of Nudity, Sexuality, or Seduction	Only Lovers Left Alive – Tilda Swinton and Tom Hiddleston	
2014	Actress Defying Age and Ageism	Tilda Swinton (WON)	
2014	Actress Defying Age and Ageism	Julianne Moore	
2014	Actress Defying Age and Ageism	Meryl Streep	
2014	Most Egregious Age Difference between the Leading Man and the Love Interest	Magic in the Moonlight – Colin Firth (b. 1960) and Emma Stone (b. 1988) (WON)	
2014	Most Egregious Age Difference between the Leading Man and the Love Interest	Draft Day – Kevin Costner (b. 1955) and Jennifer Garner (b. 1972)	
2014	Most Egregious Age Difference between the Leading Man and the Love Interest	Edge of Tomorrow – Tom Cruise (b. 1962) and Emily Blunt (b. 1983)	
2015	Best Depiction of Nudity, Sexuality, or Seduction	Anomalisa (WON) (TIE)	
2015	Best Depiction of Nudity, Sexuality, or Seduction	Carol (WON) (TIE)	
2015	Best Depiction of Nudity, Sexuality, or Seduction	The Diary of a Teenage Girl	
2015	Actress Defying Age and Ageism	Charlotte Rampling (WON) (TIE)	
2015	Actress Defying Age and Ageism	Lily Tomlin (WON) (TIE)	
2015	Actress Defying Age and Ageism	Helen Mirren	
2015	Most Egregious Age Difference between the Lead and the Love Interest Award	Danny Collins – Al Pacino (b. 1940) and Katarina Čas (b. 1976) (WON)	
2015	Most Egregious Age Difference between the Lead and the Love Interest Award	Freeheld – Julianne Moore (b. 1960) and Elliot Page (b. 1987)	
2015	Most Egregious Age Difference between the Lead and the Love Interest Award	Irrational Man – Joaquin Phoenix (b. 1974) and Emma Stone (b. 1988)	
2015	Most Egregious Age Difference between the Lead and the Love Interest Award	Spectre – Daniel Craig (b. 1968) and Léa Seydoux (b. 1985)	
2015	Actress Most in Need of a New Agent	Emma Stone – Aloha (WON)	
2015	Actress Most in Need of a New Agent	Bryce Dallas Howard – Jurassic World	
2015	Actress Most in Need of a New Agent	Dakota Johnson – Fifty Shades of Grey	
2015	Movie You Wanted to Love But Just Couldn't	The Danish Girl (WON)	
2015	Movie You Wanted to Love But Just Couldn't	Aloha	
2015	Movie You Wanted to Love But Just Couldn't	The Hateful Eight	
2015	Movie You Wanted to Love But Just Couldn't	Sisters	
2016	Actress Defying Age and Ageism	Annette Bening – 20th Century Women (WON) (TIE)	
2016	Actress Defying Age and Ageism	Isabelle Huppert – Elle and Things to Come (WON) (TIE)	
2016	Actress Defying Age and Ageism	Viola Davis – Fences	
2016	Actress Defying Age and Ageism	Sally Field – Hello, My Name Is Doris	
2016	Actress Defying Age and Ageism	Helen Mirren – Eye in the Sky	
2016	Most Egregious Age Difference between the Lead and the Love Interest Award	Rules Don't Apply – Warren Beatty (b. 1937) and Lily Collins (b. 1989) (WON)	
2016	Most Egregious Age Difference between the Lead and the Love Interest Award	Dirty Grandpa – Robert De Niro (b. 1943) and Aubrey Plaza (b. 1984)	
2016	Most Egregious Age Difference between the Lead and the Love Interest Award	Independence Day: Resurgence – Charlotte Gainsbourg (b. 1971) and Jeff Goldblum (b. 1952)	
2016	Most Egregious Age Difference between the Lead and the Love Interest Award	Mechanic: Resurrection – Jason Statham (b. 1967) and Jessica Alba (b. 1981)	
2016	Actress Most in Need of a New Agent	Jennifer Aniston – Mother's Day and Office Christmas Party (WON)	
2016	Actress Most in Need of a New Agent	Melissa McCarthy – The Boss and Ghostbusters	
2016	Actress Most in Need of a New Agent	Margot Robbie – Suicide Squad and The Legend of Tarzan	
2016	Actress Most in Need of a New Agent	Julia Roberts – Mother's Day	
2016	Actress Most in Need of a New Agent	Shailene Woodley – The Divergent Series	
2016	Bravest Performance Award	Isabelle Huppert – Elle (WON)	
2016	Bravest Performance Award	Jessica Chastain – Miss Sloane	
2016	Bravest Performance Award	Naomie Harris – Moonlight	
2016	Bravest Performance Award	Sasha Lane – American Honey	
2016	Bravest Performance Award	Ruth Negga – Loving	
2016	Sequel or Remake That Shouldn't Have Been Made Award	Ben-Hur (WON)	
2016	Sequel or Remake That Shouldn't Have Been Made Award	Ghostbusters	
2016	Sequel or Remake That Shouldn't Have Been Made Award	Independence Day: Resurgence	
2016	Sequel or Remake That Shouldn't Have Been Made Award	The Magnificent Seven	
2016	Sequel or Remake That Shouldn't Have Been Made Award	My Big Fat Greek Wedding 2	
2016	AWFJ Hall of Shame Award	Sharon Maguire and Renée Zellweger – Bridget Jones's Baby (WON)	
2016	AWFJ Hall of Shame Award	Nicolas Winding Refn and Elle Fanning – The Neon Demon	
2016	AWFJ Hall of Shame Award	David Ayer and Margot Robbie – Suicide Squad	
2016	AWFJ Hall of Shame Award	David E. Talbert and Mo'Nique – Almost Christmas	
2017	Actress Defying Age and Ageism		
2017	Actress Defying Age and Ageism	Agnès Varda – Faces, Places (WON)	
2017	Actress Defying Age and Ageism	Annette Bening – Film Stars Don't Die in Liverpool	
2017	Actress Defying Age and Ageism	Frances McDormand – Three Billboards Outside Ebbing, Missouri	
2017	Most Egregious Age Difference between the Lead and the Love Interest Award		
2017	Most Egregious Age Difference between the Lead and the Love Interest Award	I Love You, Daddy – Chloe Grace Moretz (b. 1997) and John Malkovich (b. 1953) (WON)	
2017	Most Egregious Age Difference between the Lead and the Love Interest Award	mother! – Jennifer Lawrence (b. 1990) and Javier Bardem (b. 1969)	
2017	Most Egregious Age Difference between the Lead and the Love Interest Award	The Mummy and American Made – Tom Cruise (b. 1962) with Annabelle Wallis (b. 1984) and Sarah Wright (b. 1983), respectively	
2017	Actress Most in Need of a New Agent		
2017	Actress Most in Need of a New Agent	Kate Winslet for Wonder Wheel and The Mountain Between Us (WON)	
2017	Actress Most in Need of a New Agent	Dakota Johnson for 50 Shades Darker	
2017	Actress Most in Need of a New Agent	Jennifer Lawrence for mother!	
2017	Bravest Performance Award		
2017	Bravest Performance Award	Sally Hawkins – The Shape of Water (WON) (TIE)	
2017	Bravest Performance Award	Margot Robbie – I, Tonya (WON) (TIE)	
2017	Bravest Performance Award	Frances McDormand – Three Billboards Outside Ebbing, Missouri	
2017	Sequel or Remake That Shouldn't Have Been Made Award		
2017	Sequel or Remake That Shouldn't Have Been Made Award	The Mummy (WON)	
2017	Sequel or Remake That Shouldn't Have Been Made Award	Baywatch	
2017	Sequel or Remake That Shouldn't Have Been Made Award	Murder on the Orient Express	
2017	AWFJ Hall of Shame Award		
2017	AWFJ Hall of Shame Award	The Sexual Tormentors – Harvey Weinstein, Kevin Spacey, Brett Ratner, et al. (WON)	
2017	AWFJ Hall of Shame Award	Darren Aronofsky and all associated with mother!	
2017	AWFJ Hall of Shame Award	Louis C.K. and all associated with I Love You, Daddy	
2018	Actress Defying Age and Ageism		
2018	Actress Defying Age and Ageism	Viola Davis – Widows (WON)	
2018	Actress Defying Age and Ageism	Glenn Close – The Wife	
2018	Actress Defying Age and Ageism	Nicole Kidman – Destroyer	
2018	Actress Defying Age and Ageism	Sissy Spacek – The Old Man & the Gun	
2018	Actress Defying Age and Ageism	Eileen Atkins, Judi Dench, Joan Plowright, Maggie Smith – Tea With the Dames	
2018	Bravest Performance		
2018	Bravest Performance	Olivia Colman – The Favourite (WON)	
2018	Bravest Performance	Toni Collette – Hereditary	
2018	Bravest Performance	Viola Davis – Widows	
2018	Bravest Performance	Nicole Kidman – Destroyer	
2018	Bravest Performance	Melissa McCarthy – Can You Ever Forgive Me?	
2018	Bravest Performance	Charlize Theron – Tully	
2018	Bravest Performance	Mary Elizabeth Winstead – All About Nina	
2018	Actress Most in Need of a New Agent		
2018	Actress Most in Need of a New Agent	Jennifer Lawrence – Red Sparrow (WON)	
2018	Actress Most in Need of a New Agent	Anna Faris – Overboard	
2018	Actress Most in Need of a New Agent	Jennifer Garner – Peppermint	
2018	Actress Most in Need of a New Agent	Dakota Johnson – Fifty Shades Freed	
2018	Actress Most in Need of a New Agent	Melissa McCarthy – Life of the Party and The Happytime Murders	
2018	Actress Most in Need of a New Agent	Amy Schumer – I Feel Pretty	
2018	Most Egregious Age Difference between the Lead and the Love Interest		
2018	Most Egregious Age Difference between the Lead and the Love Interest	Mission: Impossible – Fallout – Tom Cruise (b. 1962) and Rebecca Ferguson (b. 1983) (WON)	
2018	Most Egregious Age Difference between the Lead and the Love Interest	Mandy – Nicolas Cage (b. 1964) and Andrea Riseborough (b. 1981)	
2018	Most Egregious Age Difference between the Lead and the Love Interest	Overboard – Eugenio Derbez (b. 1961) and Anna Faris (b. 1976)	
2018	Most Egregious Age Difference between the Lead and the Love Interest	Red Sparrow – Jennifer Lawrence (b. 1990) and Joel Edgerton (b. 1974)	
2018	Most Egregious Age Difference between the Lead and the Love Interest	Siberia – Ana Ularu (b. 1985) and Keanu Reeves (b. 1964)	
2018	Sequel or Remake That Shouldn't Have Been Made		
2018	Sequel or Remake That Shouldn't Have Been Made	Overboard (WON)	
2018	Sequel or Remake That Shouldn't Have Been Made	Death Wish	
2018	Sequel or Remake That Shouldn't Have Been Made	Fifty Shades Freed	
2018	Sequel or Remake That Shouldn't Have Been Made	The Predator	
2018	Sequel or Remake That Shouldn't Have Been Made	Robin Hood	
2018	AWFJ Hall of Shame Award		
2018	AWFJ Hall of Shame Award	Abusers and alleged abusers – Harvey Weinstein, Les Moonves, Louis C.K., James Franco, Bryan Singer, Charlie Rose, Matt Lauer et al. (WON)	
2018	AWFJ Hall of Shame Award	Fifty Shades Freed	
2018	AWFJ Hall of Shame Award	The Happytime Murders	
2018	AWFJ Hall of Shame Award	Red Sparrow	
2019	Grand Dame Award for Defying Ageism	Zhao Shuzhen – The Farewell (WON)	
2019	Grand Dame Award for Defying Ageism	Maggie Smith – Downton Abbey	
2019	Grand Dame Award for Defying Ageism	Helen Mirren – The Good Liar	
2019	Most Daring Performance Award	Aisling Franciosi – The Nightingale (WON)	
2019	Most Daring Performance Award	Jennifer Lopez – Hustlers	
2019	Most Daring Performance Award	Lupita Nyong'o – Us	
2019	Most Daring Performance Award	Florence Pugh – Midsommar	
2019	Most Daring Performance Award	Renée Zellweger – Judy	
2019	She Deserves a New Agent Award	Anne Hathaway – The Hustle and Serenity (WON)	
2019	She Deserves a New Agent Award	Diane Keaton and ensemble – Poms	
2019	She Deserves a New Agent Award	Kristen Stewart – Charlie's Angels and Seberg	
2019	Most Egregious Lovers' Age Difference Award	The Public – Emilio Estevez (b. 1962) and Taylor Schilling (b. 1984), 22 years (WON)	
2019	Most Egregious Lovers' Age Difference Award	Dolemite Is My Name – Eddie Murphy (b. 1961) and Da'Vine Joy Randolph (b. 1986), 25 years	
2019	Most Egregious Lovers' Age Difference Award	Lucy in the Sky – Jon Hamm (b. 1971) and Zazie Beetz (b. 1991), 20 years	
2019	Time Waster Remake or Sequel Award	Charlie's Angels (WON)	
2019	Time Waster Remake or Sequel Award	Dumbo	
2019	Time Waster Remake or Sequel Award	The Lion King	
2019	Time Waster Remake or Sequel Award	Men in Black: International	
2019	Time Waster Remake or Sequel Award	Dark Phoenix	
2019	AWFJ Hall of Shame Award	HFPA for excluding women nominees in major Golden Globe categories (WON)	
2019	AWFJ Hall of Shame Award	Louis C.K. comeback tour	
2019	AWFJ Hall of Shame Award	The Beach Bum	
2019	AWFJ Hall of Shame Award	Harvey Weinstein, more of the same	
2020	Grand Dame Award for Defying Ageism	Sophia Loren – The Life Ahead (WON)	
2020	Grand Dame Award for Defying Ageism	Ellen Burstyn – Pieces of a Woman	
2020	Grand Dame Award for Defying Ageism	Tsai Chin – Lucky Grandma	
2020	Grand Dame Award for Defying Ageism	Frances McDormand – Nomadland	
2020	Most Daring Performance Award	Maria Bakalova – Borat Subsequent Moviefilm (WON)	
2020	Most Daring Performance Award	Haley Bennett – Swallow	
2020	Most Daring Performance Award	Elisabeth Moss – The Invisible Man	
2020	Most Daring Performance Award	Vanessa Kirby – Pieces of a Woman	
2020	She Deserves a New Agent Award	Uma Thurman – The War with Grandpa (WON)	
2020	She Deserves a New Agent Award	Katie Holmes – The Secret: Dare to Dream	
2020	She Deserves a New Agent Award	Rose Byrne – Like a Boss	
2020	She Deserves a New Agent Award	Tiffany Haddish – Like a Boss	
2020	Most Egregious Lovers' Age Difference Award	Tenet – Elizabeth Debicki (b. 1990) and Kenneth Branagh (b. 1960), 30 years (WON)	
2020	Most Egregious Lovers' Age Difference Award	The Burnt Orange Heresy – Elizabeth Debicki (b. 1990) and Claes Bang (b. 1967), 23 years	
2020	Most Egregious Lovers' Age Difference Award	The Devil All the Time – Riley Keough (b. 1989) and Jason Clarke (b. 1969), 20 years	
2020	Most Egregious Lovers' Age Difference Award	Mank – Amanda Seyfried (b. 1985) and Charles Dance (b. 1946), 39 years; and Seyfried and Gary Oldman (b. 1958), 27 years	
2020	Time Waster Remake or Sequel Award	Dolittle (WON)	
2020	Time Waster Remake or Sequel Award	The Croods: A New Age	
2020	Time Waster Remake or Sequel Award	Rebecca	
2020	AWFJ Hall of Shame Award	Christopher Nolan for insisting that Tenet be screened exclusively in theaters during a pandemic (WON) (TIE)	
2020	AWFJ Hall of Shame Award	Dallas Sonnier and Adam Donaghey at Cinestate for sexual harassment, abuse, and coverup (WON) (TIE)	
2020	AWFJ Hall of Shame Award	Shia LaBeouf for his ongoing abusive behavior	
2021	Grand Dame Award for Defying Agism	Dame Judi Dench (WON)	
2021	Grand Dame Award for Defying Agism	Rita Moreno	
2021	Grand Dame Award for Defying Agism	Dame Diana Rigg	
2021	Most Egregious Lovers' Age Difference Award	The Many Saints of Newark: Ray Liotta and Michela DeRossi (38 years)	
2021	Most Egregious Lovers' Age Difference Award	Red Rocket: Simon Rex and Suzanna Son (21 years)	
2021	Most Egregious Lovers' Age Difference Award	The Hitman's Wife's Bodyguard: Salma Hayek and Samuel L. Jackson (17 years)	
2021	Most Egregious Lovers' Age Difference Award	Nightmare Alley: David Strathairn and Toni Collette (22 years)	
2021	Most Egregious Lovers' Age Difference Award	Licorice Pizza: Alana Haim and Cooper Hoffman (10 years)	
2021	Most Egregious Lovers' Age Difference Award	No Time to Die: Daniel Craig and Léa Seydoux (17 years) (WON)	
2021	She Deserves a New Agent Award	Amy Adams for The Woman in the Window and Dear Evan Hansen	
2021	She Deserves a New Agent Award	Melissa McCarthy for The Starling (WON)	
2021	She Deserves a New Agent Award	Chloe Grace Moretz for Tom & Jerry	
2021	Most Daring Performance Award	Sandra Bullock – The Unforgivable	
2021	Most Daring Performance Award	Olivia Colman – The Lost Daughter	
2021	Most Daring Performance Award	Ruth Negga – Passing	
2021	Most Daring Performance Award	Renate Reinsve – The Worst Person in the World	
2021	Most Daring Performance Award	Agathe Rousselle – Titane (WON)	
2021	Time Waster Remake or Sequel Award	Space Jam: A New Legacy (WON)	
2021	Time Waster Remake or Sequel Award	The Boss Baby: Family Business	
2021	Time Waster Remake or Sequel Award	Cruella	
2021	Time Waster Remake or Sequel Award	Ghostbusters: Afterlife	
2021	Time Waster Remake or Sequel Award	Tom & Jerry	
2021	AWFJ Hall of Shame Award	Gina Carano, Nicki Minaj and Letitia Wright for using celeb status for antivax propaganda	
2021	AWFJ Hall of Shame Award	Producers, crew and cast of Rust for not following proper safety protocol and causing the tragic death of cinematographer Halyna Hutchins (WON)	
2021	AWFJ Hall of Shame Award	Warner Bros for contributing to Mel Gibson's resurgence by hiring him to direct Lethal Weapon 5.	
2022	Grand Dame Award for Defying Agism	Emma Thompson (WON)	
2022	Grand Dame Award for Defying Agism	Viola Davis	
2022	Grand Dame Award for Defying Agism	Jamie Lee Curtis	
2022	Grand Dame Award for Defying Agism	Michelle Yeoh	
2022	Most Egregious Lovers' Age Difference Award	Crimes of the Future: Viggo Mortensen and Léa Seydoux (27 years) (WON)	
2022	Most Egregious Lovers' Age Difference Award	Confess, Fletch: Jon Hamm and Lorenza Izzo (17 years)	
2022	Most Egregious Lovers' Age Difference Award	Deep Water: Ben Affleck and Ana de Armas (16 years)	
2022	Most Egregious Lovers' Age Difference Award	Eiffel: Romain Duris and Emma Mackey (22 years)	
2022	She Deserves a New Agent Award	Ana de Armas for Blonde (WON)	
2022	She Deserves a New Agent Award	Bryce Dallas Howard for Jurassic World Dominion	
2022	She Deserves a New Agent Award	Margot Robbie for Babylon	
2022	She Deserves a New Agent Award	Rebel Wilson for Senior Year	
2022	Most Daring Performance	Emma Thompson – Good Luck to You, Leo Grande (WON)	
2022	Most Daring Performance	Cate Blanchett – Tár	
2022	Most Daring Performance	Viola Davis – The Woman King	
2022	Most Daring Performance	Danielle Deadwyler – Till	
2022	Most Daring Performance	Michelle Yeoh – Everything Everywhere All at Once	
2022	Time Waster Remake or Sequel Award	Jurassic World Dominion (WON)	
2022	Time Waster Remake or Sequel Award	Firestarter	
2022	Time Waster Remake or Sequel Award	Halloween Ends	
2022	Time Waster Remake or Sequel Award	Disney's Pinocchio	
2022	AWFJ Hall of Shame Award (Women and men are eligible)	Harvey Weinstein for everything and forever. (WON)	
2022	AWFJ Hall of Shame Award (Women and men are eligible)	Alec Baldwin and the crew of Rust for continuing to deny responsibility for the on set shooting that killed cinematographer Halyna Hutchins. The situation is still messy. A wrongful death lawsuit was settled, but the criminal investigation continues. In November, Baldwin sued crew members for giving him the loaded prop gun that killed cinematographer Halyna Hutchins. News reports say Baldwin also texted Hutchins's husband, Matthew, saying that the gun was never meant to be fired at a particular camera angle.	
2022	AWFJ Hall of Shame Award (Women and men are eligible)	Blonde and Andrew Dominik	
2022	AWFJ Hall of Shame Award (Women and men are eligible)	Will Smith for his behavior at the Oscars and in the aftermath	
2023	Grand Dame Award for Defying Agism	Annette Bening – Nyad (WON)	
2023	Grand Dame Award for Defying Agism	Julia Louis-Dreyfus – You Hurt My Feelings	
2023	Grand Dame Award for Defying Agism	Jodie Foster – Nyad	
2023	Grand Dame Award for Defying Agism	Helen Mirren – Golda and Fast X	
2023	Grand Dame Award for Defying Agism	Julianne Moore – May December	
2023	Most Egregious Lovers' Age Difference Award	Oppenheimer – Cillian Murphy (47) and Florence Pugh (27) (WON)	
2023	Most Egregious Lovers' Age Difference Award	Killers of the Flower Moon – Leo DiCaprio (49) and Lily Gladstone (37)	
2023	Most Egregious Lovers' Age Difference Award	Mission: Impossible – Dead Reckoning Part One – Tom Cruise (61) and Hayley Atwell (41)	
2023	Most Egregious Lovers' Age Difference Award	Poor Things – Mark Ruffalo (56) and Emma Stone (35)	
2023	She Deserves a New Agent Award	Candice Bergen, Jane Fonda, Diane Keaton and Mary Steenburgen – Book Club: The Next Chapter (WON/TIE)	
2023	She Deserves a New Agent Award	Toni Collette – Mafia Mamma (WON/TIE)	
2023	She Deserves a New Agent Award	Ana de Armas – Ghosted	
2023	She Deserves a New Agent Award	Nia Vardalos – My Big Fat Greek Wedding 3	
2023	She Deserves a New Agent Award	Reese Witherspoon – Your Place or Mine	
2023	Most Daring Performance	Emma Stone – Poor Things (WON)	
2023	Most Daring Performance	Annette Bening – Nyad	
2023	Most Daring Performance	Sandra Hüller – Anatomy of a Fall	
2023	Most Daring Performance	Sandra Hüller – The Zone of Interest	
2023	Most Daring Performance	Julianne Moore – May December	
2023	Time Waster Remake or Sequel Award	The Exorcist: Believer (WON)	
2023	Time Waster Remake or Sequel Award	Expend4bles	
2023	Time Waster Remake or Sequel Award	The Hunger Games: The Ballad of Songbirds & Snakes	
2023	Time Waster Remake or Sequel Award	Indiana Jones and the Dial of Destiny	
2023	Time Waster Remake or Sequel Award	Magic Mike's Last Dance	
2023	AWFJ Hall of Shame Award (Women and men are eligible)	The AMPTP and studio heads for their despicable behavior concerning the WGA and SAG-AFTRA negotiations and strikes. (WON)	
2023	AWFJ Hall of Shame Award (Women and men are eligible)	Drew Barrymore for resuming her show during the WGA strike, resulting in three writers leaving the show.	
2023	AWFJ Hall of Shame Award (Women and men are eligible)	Greta Gerwig for crossing WGA and SAG-AFTRA picket lines (she's a member of both and although not an actor in Barbie, she co-wrote it) to promote Barbie, claiming she was just there as a non-striking director. Her co-writer Noah Baumbach respected the picket line. Media gave her a free pass while Black director Justin Simien (not a member of any striking guild) was given flack for attending the Disney premiere of his film Haunted Mansion. Shame on Greta.	
2023	AWFJ Hall of Shame Award (Women and men are eligible)	Jonathan Majors for domestic violence.	
2023	AWFJ Hall of Shame Award (Women and men are eligible)	Danny Masterson, sentenced to 30 years to life in prison after having been found guilty of raping two women.	
