= List of accolades received by Moonlight (2016 film) =

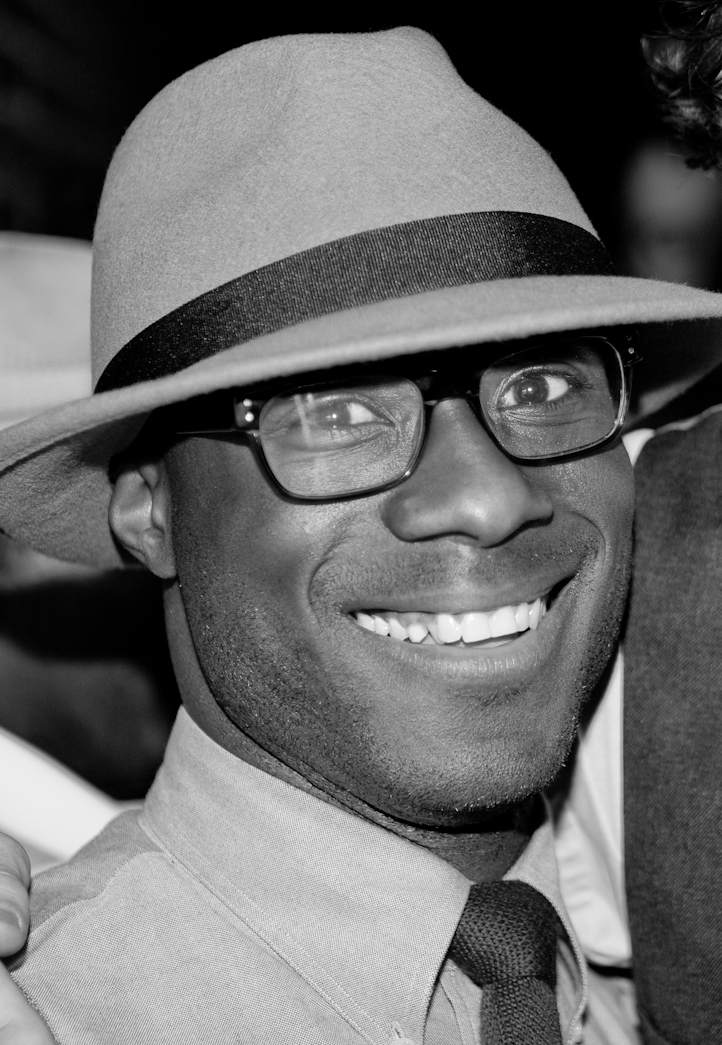
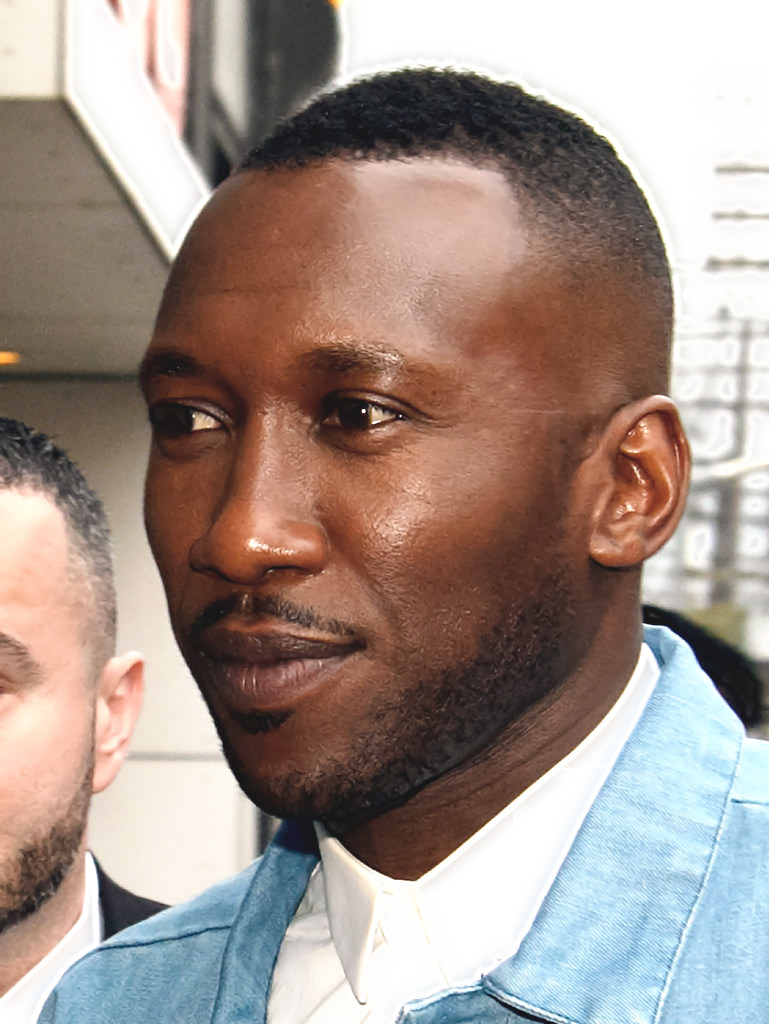
- Barry Jenkins and Mahershala Ali received several awards and nominations for their direction and performance in the film respectively.
Accolades
Award	Won	Nominated
AACTA International Awards	0	2
Academy Awards	3	8
African-American Film Critics Association	5	5
Alliance of Women Film Journalists	7	10
American Cinema Editors	0	1
American Film Institute	1	1
American Society of Cinematographers	0	1
Atlantic Film Festival	1	1
Austin Film Critics Association	6	11
Australian Film Critics Association	1	1
Balinale	1	1
BET Awards	1	2
BFI London Film Festival	0	1
Black Reel Awards	7	13
Boston Society of Film Critics	2	2
British Academy Film Awards	0	4
British Independent Film Awards	1	1
Camerimage	0	1
Casting Society of America	1	1
Chicago Film Critics Association	3	11
Chicago International Film Festival	1	1
Critics' Choice Movie Awards	2	10
Dallas-Fort Worth Film Critics Association	4	6
Detroit Film Critics Society	0	8
Directors Guild of America Awards	0	1
Dorian Awards	5	7
Florida Film Critics Circle	2	11
Georgia Film Critics Association	6	9
GLAAD Media Awards	1	1
Golden Globe Awards	1	6
Golden Trailer Awards	3	7
Gotham Awards	4	4
Guldbagge Awards	0	1
Hawaii International Film Festival	1	1
Hollywood Film Awards	1	1
Hollywood Music in Media Awards	1	1
Houston Film Critics Society	0	7
Independent Spirit Awards	6	6
International Film Festival Rotterdam	1	1
International Film Music Critics Association	0	1
Irish Film & Television Awards	1	1
London Film Critics Circle	2	7
Los Angeles Film Critics Association	4	4
Mar del Plata International Film Festival	1	2
Mill Valley Film Festival	1	1
NAACP Image Awards	4	6
National Board of Review	2	2
National Society of Film Critics	4	6
New York Film Critics Circle	3	3
New York Film Critics Online	6	6
Online Film Critics Society	4	7
Palm Springs International Film Festival	1	1
Producers Guild of America	0	1
San Diego Film Critics Society	1	6
San Francisco Film Critics Circle	6	8
Santa Barbara International Film Festival	3	3
Satellite Awards	2	7
Screen Actors Guild Awards	1	3
Seattle Film Critics Society	6	10
St. Louis Film Critics Association	1	8
Toronto Film Critics Association	2	5
Toronto International Film Festival	0	1
USC Scripter Awards	1	1
Vancouver Film Critics Circle	1	4
Village Voice Film Poll	3	3
Washington D.C. Area Film Critics Association	1	9
Women Film Critics Circle	0	1
Writers Guild of America Awards	1	1
Young Artist Awards	0	1
- Total number of awards and nominations
Totals	161	288	
- References

Moonlight is a 2016 American drama film directed by Barry Jenkins. It is an adaptation of Tarell Alvin McCraney's play In Moonlight Black Boys Look Blue. Produced by Dede Gardner, Jeremy Kleiner, and Adele Romanski, it focuses on the life of Chiron, an African-American homosexual man struggling with his sexuality and identity while growing up in Miami, Florida. Moonlight stars Trevante Rhodes as Adult Chiron and André Holland as Adult Kevin, Chiron's closest friend. Naomie Harris, Mahershala Ali, and Janelle Monáe feature in supporting roles as Paula (Chiron's mother who suffers with drug addiction), Juan (a drug dealer), and Teresa (Juan's girlfriend) respectively. Moonlight premiered at the Telluride Film Festival on September 2, 2016. It also screened at the Toronto International Film Festival on September 10, 2016, and the New York Film Festival on October 2, 2016. The film is the first produced by A24, which provided an initial limited release on October 21 before expanding to a wide release on November 18 at more than 600 theaters. It grossed a worldwide total of over $65 million at the box office on a $1.5 million budget. Review aggregator website Rotten Tomatoes surveyed 392 reviews and judged 98% to be positive.

Moonlight garnered awards and nominations in a variety of categories with particular praise for its direction and the performances of Ali and Harris. At the 89th Academy Awards, the film received eight nominations including Best Picture, Best Director for Jenkins and Best Supporting Actress for Harris. It went on to win Best Picture, Best Supporting Actor for Ali, and Best Adapted Screenplay. At the ceremony, romantic musical La La Land was incorrectly announced as the winner of Best Picture after the presenters had been given the wrong envelope. Moonlight was both the first film with an all-Black cast and the first LGBT-themed film to win Best Picture and Ali's win was the first for a Muslim actor in Academy Awards history. The film garnered six nominations at the 74th Golden Globe Awards and won Best Motion Picture – Drama. At the 70th British Academy Film Awards, Moonlight earned four nominations including Best Film, Best Actor in a Supporting Role for Ali, and Best Actress in a Supporting Role for Harris.

At the 32nd Independent Spirit Awards, the film won six awards including Best Film, Best Director for Jenkins, and Best Screenplay. Moonlight garnered three nominations at the 23rd Screen Actors Guild Awards with Ali winning for Outstanding Performance by a Male Actor in a Supporting Role. It also received a nomination at the 69th Directors Guild of America Awards and 28th Producers Guild of America Awards. At the 22nd Critics' Choice Awards, Moonlight earned ten nominations including Best Picture, Best Director for Jenkins, and Best Supporting Actress for Harris. It went on to win Best Supporting Actor for Ali and Best Acting Ensemble. The American Film Institute included the film in their top ten movies of 2016.

== Accolades ==
Award	Date of ceremony	Category	Recipient(s)	Result	Ref.
AACTA International Awards	January 8, 2017	Best Supporting Actor	Mahershala Ali	Nominated	
AACTA International Awards	January 8, 2017	Best Supporting Actress	Naomie Harris	Nominated	
Academy Awards	February 26, 2017	Best Picture	Dede Gardner, Jeremy Kleiner and Adele Romanski	Won	
Academy Awards	February 26, 2017	Best Director	Barry Jenkins	Nominated	
Academy Awards	February 26, 2017	Best Supporting Actor	Mahershala Ali	Won	
Academy Awards	February 26, 2017	Best Supporting Actress	Naomie Harris	Nominated	
Academy Awards	February 26, 2017	Best Adapted Screenplay	Barry Jenkins and Tarell Alvin McCraney	Won	
Academy Awards	February 26, 2017	Best Cinematography	James Laxton	Nominated	
Academy Awards	February 26, 2017	Best Film Editing	Joi McMillon and Nat Sanders	Nominated	
Academy Awards	February 26, 2017	Best Original Score	Nicholas Britell	Nominated	
African-American Film Critics Association	February 9, 2017	Best Picture	Moonlight	Won	
African-American Film Critics Association	February 9, 2017	Best Director	Barry Jenkins	Won	
African-American Film Critics Association	February 9, 2017	Best Supporting Actor	Mahershala Ali	Won	
African-American Film Critics Association	February 9, 2017	Breakout Performance	Janelle Monáe (also for Hidden Figures)	Won	
African-American Film Critics Association	February 9, 2017	Best Independent Film	Moonlight	Won	
Alliance of Women Film Journalists	December 21, 2016	Best Film	Moonlight	Won	
Alliance of Women Film Journalists	December 21, 2016	Best Director	Barry Jenkins	Won	
Alliance of Women Film Journalists	December 21, 2016	Best Supporting Actor	Mahershala Ali	Won	
Alliance of Women Film Journalists	December 21, 2016	Best Supporting Actress	Naomie Harris	Nominated	
Alliance of Women Film Journalists	December 21, 2016	Best Adapted Screenplay	Barry Jenkins	Won	
Alliance of Women Film Journalists	December 21, 2016	Best Cinematography	James Laxton	Won	
Alliance of Women Film Journalists	December 21, 2016	Best Editing	Joi McMillon and Nat Sanders	Won	
Alliance of Women Film Journalists	December 21, 2016	Best Ensemble Cast – Casting Director	Yesi Ramirez	Won	
Alliance of Women Film Journalists	December 21, 2016	Best Breakthrough Performance	Janelle Monáe (also for Hidden Figures)	Nominated	
Alliance of Women Film Journalists	December 21, 2016	Bravest Performance	Naomie Harris	Nominated	
American Cinema Editors	January 27, 2017	Best Edited Feature Film – Dramatic	Joi McMillon and Nat Sanders	Nominated	
American Film Institute	December 7, 2016	Top Ten Movies of the Year	Moonlight	Won	
American Society of Cinematographers	February 4, 2017	Outstanding Achievement in Cinematography in Theatrical Releases	James Laxton	Nominated	
Atlantic Film Festival	September 26, 2016	Audience Award	Moonlight	Won	
Austin Film Critics Association	December 28, 2016	Best Film	Moonlight	Won	
Austin Film Critics Association	December 28, 2016	Best Director	Barry Jenkins	Won	
Austin Film Critics Association	December 28, 2016	Best Supporting Actor	Mahershala Ali	Won	
Austin Film Critics Association	December 28, 2016	Best Supporting Actor	Trevante Rhodes	Nominated	
Austin Film Critics Association	December 28, 2016	Best Supporting Actress	Naomie Harris	Nominated	
Austin Film Critics Association	December 28, 2016	Best Original Screenplay	Barry Jenkins	Won	
Austin Film Critics Association	December 28, 2016	Best Cinematography	James Laxton	Nominated	
Austin Film Critics Association	December 28, 2016	Breakthrough Artist Award	Barry Jenkins (director and screenwriter)	Nominated	
Austin Film Critics Association	December 28, 2016	Breakthrough Artist Award	Trevante Rhodes (actor)	Nominated	
Austin Film Critics Association	December 28, 2016	Special Honorary Award	Yesi Ramirez and the cast of Moonlight for excellence as an ensemble	Won	
Austin Film Critics Association	December 28, 2016	Special Honorary Award	A24 for excellence in production and distribution (also for Green Room, Swiss Army Man, The Lobster, The Witch, and 20th Century Women)	Won	
Australian Film Critics Association	March 13, 2018	Best International Film (English Language)	Moonlight	Won	
Balinale	September 30, 2017	Best Feature Film – Audience Choice Award	Moonlight	Won	
BET Awards	June 25, 2017	Best Actor	Mahershala Ali	Won	
BET Awards	June 25, 2017	Best Movie	Moonlight	Nominated	
BFI London Film Festival	October 16, 2016	Best Film	Moonlight	Nominated	
Black Reel Awards	February 16, 2017	Outstanding Film	Dede Gardner, Jeremy Kleiner, and Adele Romanski	Won	
Black Reel Awards	February 16, 2017	Outstanding Director	Barry Jenkins	Won	
Black Reel Awards	February 16, 2017	Outstanding Supporting Actor	Mahershala Ali	Won	
Black Reel Awards	February 16, 2017	Outstanding Supporting Actor	André Holland	Nominated	
Black Reel Awards	February 16, 2017	Outstanding Supporting Actor	Ashton Sanders	Nominated	
Black Reel Awards	February 16, 2017	Outstanding Supporting Actress	Naomie Harris	Nominated	
Black Reel Awards	February 16, 2017	Outstanding Supporting Actress	Janelle Monáe	Nominated	
Black Reel Awards	February 16, 2017	Outstanding Screenplay, Adapted or Original	Barry Jenkins	Won	
Black Reel Awards	February 16, 2017	Outstanding Ensemble	The cast of Moonlight	Won	
Black Reel Awards	February 16, 2017	Outstanding Breakthrough Performance, Male	Alex Hibbert	Nominated	
Black Reel Awards	February 16, 2017	Outstanding Breakthrough Performance, Male	Trevante Rhodes	Won	
Black Reel Awards	February 16, 2017	Outstanding Breakthrough Performance, Male	Ashton Sanders	Nominated	
Black Reel Awards	February 16, 2017	Outstanding Original Score	Nicholas Britell	Won	
Boston Society of Film Critics	December 11, 2016	Best Supporting Actor	Mahershala Ali	Won	
Boston Society of Film Critics	December 11, 2016	Best Cast	The cast of Moonlight	Won	
British Academy Film Awards	February 12, 2017	Best Film	Dede Gardner, Jeremy Kleiner, and Adele Romanski	Nominated	
British Academy Film Awards	February 12, 2017	Best Actor in a Supporting Role	Mahershala Ali	Nominated	
British Academy Film Awards	February 12, 2017	Best Actress in a Supporting Role	Naomie Harris	Nominated	
British Academy Film Awards	February 12, 2017	Best Original Screenplay	Barry Jenkins	Nominated	
British Independent Film Awards	December 4, 2016	Best Foreign Independent Film	Dede Gardner, Barry Jenkins, Jeremy Kleiner, Tarell Alvin McCraney, and Adele Romanski	Won	
Camerimage	November 19, 2016	Golden Frog Award for Best Cinematography	James Laxton	Nominated	
Casting Society of America	January 19, 2017	Feature Low Budget – Comedy or Drama	Yesi Ramirez	Won	
Chicago Film Critics Association	December 15, 2016	Best Film	Moonlight	Won	
Chicago Film Critics Association	December 15, 2016	Best Director	Barry Jenkins	Won	
Chicago Film Critics Association	December 15, 2016	Best Supporting Actor	Mahershala Ali	Won	
Chicago Film Critics Association	December 15, 2016	Best Supporting Actor	Trevante Rhodes	Nominated	
Chicago Film Critics Association	December 15, 2016	Best Supporting Actress	Naomie Harris	Nominated	
Chicago Film Critics Association	December 15, 2016	Best Original Screenplay	Barry Jenkins	Nominated	
Chicago Film Critics Association	December 15, 2016	Best Cinematography	James Laxton	Nominated	
Chicago Film Critics Association	December 15, 2016	Best Editing	Joi McMillon and Nat Sanders	Nominated	
Chicago Film Critics Association	December 15, 2016	Best Original Score	Nicholas Britell	Nominated	
Chicago Film Critics Association	December 15, 2016	Most Promising Performer	Trevante Rhodes	Nominated	
Chicago Film Critics Association	December 15, 2016	Most Promising Performer	Janelle Monáe (also for Hidden Figures)	Nominated	
Chicago International Film Festival	October 27, 2016	Audience Award	Moonlight	Won (Note: Tied with Lion)	
Critics' Choice Movie Awards	December 11, 2016	Best Picture	Moonlight	Nominated	
Critics' Choice Movie Awards	December 11, 2016	Best Director	Barry Jenkins	Nominated	
Critics' Choice Movie Awards	December 11, 2016	Best Supporting Actor	Mahershala Ali	Won	
Critics' Choice Movie Awards	December 11, 2016	Best Supporting Actress	Naomie Harris	Nominated	
Critics' Choice Movie Awards	December 11, 2016	Best Acting Ensemble	The cast of Moonlight	Won	
Critics' Choice Movie Awards	December 11, 2016	Best Young Performer	Alex Hibbert	Nominated	
Critics' Choice Movie Awards	December 11, 2016	Best Original Screenplay	Barry Jenkins	Nominated	
Critics' Choice Movie Awards	December 11, 2016	Best Cinematography	James Laxton	Nominated	
Critics' Choice Movie Awards	December 11, 2016	Best Editing	Joi McMillon and Nat Sanders	Nominated	
Critics' Choice Movie Awards	December 11, 2016	Best Original Score	Nicholas Britell	Nominated	
Dallas–Fort Worth Film Critics Association	December 13, 2016	Best Film	Moonlight	Won	
Dallas–Fort Worth Film Critics Association	December 13, 2016	Best Supporting Actor	Mahershala Ali	Won	
Dallas–Fort Worth Film Critics Association	December 13, 2016	Best Supporting Actress	Naomie Harris	2nd Place	
Dallas–Fort Worth Film Critics Association	December 13, 2016	Best Director	Barry Jenkins	Won	
Dallas–Fort Worth Film Critics Association	December 13, 2016	Best Screenplay	Barry Jenkins	2nd Place	
Dallas–Fort Worth Film Critics Association	December 13, 2016	Russell Smith Award	Moonlight	Won	
Detroit Film Critics Society	December 19, 2016	Best Film	Moonlight	Nominated	
Detroit Film Critics Society	December 19, 2016	Best Supporting Actor	Mahershala Ali	Nominated	
Detroit Film Critics Society	December 19, 2016	Best Director	Barry Jenkins	Nominated	
Detroit Film Critics Society	December 19, 2016	Best Screenplay	Barry Jenkins	Nominated	
Detroit Film Critics Society	December 19, 2016	Best Breakthrough	Mahershala Ali (actor, also for Hidden Figures)	Nominated	
Detroit Film Critics Society	December 19, 2016	Best Breakthrough	Barry Jenkins (director and screenwriter)	Nominated	
Detroit Film Critics Society	December 19, 2016	Best Breakthrough	Trevante Rhodes (actor)	Nominated	
Detroit Film Critics Society	December 19, 2016	Best Ensemble	The cast of Moonlight	Nominated	
Directors Guild of America Awards	February 4, 2017	Outstanding Directing – Feature Film	Barry Jenkins	Nominated	
Dorian Awards	January 26, 2017	Film of the Year	Moonlight	Won	
Dorian Awards	January 26, 2017	Director of the Year	Barry Jenkins	Won	
Dorian Awards	January 26, 2017	Film Performance of the Year – Actor	Mahershala Ali	Won	
Dorian Awards	January 26, 2017	Film Performance of the Year – Actor	Trevante Rhodes	Nominated	
Dorian Awards	January 26, 2017	Screenplay of the Year	Barry Jenkins	Won	
Dorian Awards	January 26, 2017	LGBTQ Film of the Year	Moonlight	Won	
Dorian Awards	January 26, 2017	Visually Striking Film of the Year	Moonlight	Nominated	
Florida Film Critics Circle	December 23, 2016	Best Film	Moonlight	Nominated	
Florida Film Critics Circle	December 23, 2016	Best Director	Barry Jenkins	Nominated	
Florida Film Critics Circle	December 23, 2016	Best Supporting Actor	Mahershala Ali	Nominated	
Florida Film Critics Circle	December 23, 2016	Best Supporting Actor	André Holland	Nominated	
Florida Film Critics Circle	December 23, 2016	Best Supporting Actress	Naomie Harris	Nominated	
Florida Film Critics Circle	December 23, 2016	Best Ensemble	The cast of Moonlight	Runner-up	
Florida Film Critics Circle	December 23, 2016	Best Adapted Screenplay	Barry Jenkins and Tarell Alvin McCraney	Runner-up	
Florida Film Critics Circle	December 23, 2016	Best Cinematography	James Laxton	Nominated	
Florida Film Critics Circle	December 23, 2016	Best Score	Moonlight	Nominated	
Florida Film Critics Circle	December 23, 2016	FCC Breakout Award	Barry Jenkins	Won	
Florida Film Critics Circle	December 23, 2016	Golden Orange (Outstanding Contribution to Film in Florida)	The cast and crew of Moonlight	Won	
Georgia Film Critics Association	January 13, 2017	Best Picture	Moonlight	Won	
Georgia Film Critics Association	January 13, 2017	Best Director	Barry Jenkins	Nominated	
Georgia Film Critics Association	January 13, 2017	Best Supporting Actor	Mahershala Ali	Won	
Georgia Film Critics Association	January 13, 2017	Best Supporting Actress	Naomie Harris	Nominated	
Georgia Film Critics Association	January 13, 2017	Best Adapted Screenplay	Barry Jenkins	Won	
Georgia Film Critics Association	January 13, 2017	Best Cinematography	James Laxton	Won	
Georgia Film Critics Association	January 13, 2017	Best Original Score	Nicholas Britell	Nominated	
Georgia Film Critics Association	January 13, 2017	Best Ensemble	The cast of Moonlight	Won	
Georgia Film Critics Association	January 13, 2017	Breakthrough Award	Mahershala Ali (actor, also for Free State of Jones, Hidden Figures and Kicks.)	Won	
GLAAD Media Awards	April 1, 2017	Outstanding Film – Wide Release	Moonlight	Won	
Golden Globe Awards	January 8, 2017	Best Motion Picture – Drama	Moonlight	Won	
Golden Globe Awards	January 8, 2017	Best Supporting Actor – Motion Picture	Mahershala Ali	Nominated	
Golden Globe Awards	January 8, 2017	Best Supporting Actress – Motion Picture	Naomie Harris	Nominated	
Golden Globe Awards	January 8, 2017	Best Director	Barry Jenkins	Nominated	
Golden Globe Awards	January 8, 2017	Best Screenplay	Barry Jenkins	Nominated	
Golden Globe Awards	January 8, 2017	Best Original Score	Nicholas Britell	Nominated	
Golden Trailer Awards	June 6, 2017	Best Drama	Moonlight	Nominated	
Golden Trailer Awards	June 6, 2017	Best Original Score	Moonlight Trailer	Nominated	
Golden Trailer Awards	June 6, 2017	Best Graphics in a TV Spot (for a Feature Film)	"Mama"	Won	
Golden Trailer Awards	June 6, 2017	Best Independent TV Spot (for a Feature Film)	"Mama"	Won	
Golden Trailer Awards	June 6, 2017	Best Music TV Spot (for a Feature Film)	"Timeless"	Nominated	
Golden Trailer Awards	June 6, 2017	Best Drama Poster	"Domestic One Sheet"	Nominated	
Golden Trailer Awards	June 6, 2017	Best Independent Poster	"Domestic One Sheet"	Won	
Gotham Awards	November 28, 2016	Best Feature	Moonlight	Won	
Gotham Awards	November 28, 2016	Best Screenplay	Barry Jenkins and Tarell Alvin McCraney	Won	
Gotham Awards	November 28, 2016	Audience Award	Moonlight	Won	
Gotham Awards	November 28, 2016	Special Jury Award – Ensemble Performance	The cast of Moonlight	Won	
Guldbagge Awards	January 22, 2018	Best Foreign Film	Moonlight	Nominated	
Hawaii International Film Festival	November 11, 2016	Best Narrative Feature	Moonlight	Won	
Hollywood Film Awards	November 6, 2016	Hollywood Breakout Actress Award	Naomie Harris (also for Collateral Beauty)	Won	
Hollywood Music in Media Awards	November 17, 2016	Best Original Score – Feature Film	Nicholas Britell	Won	
Houston Film Critics Society	January 6, 2017	Best Picture	Moonlight	Nominated	
Houston Film Critics Society	January 6, 2017	Best Supporting Actress	Naomie Harris	Nominated	
Houston Film Critics Society	January 6, 2017	Best Director	Barry Jenkins	Nominated	
Houston Film Critics Society	January 6, 2017	Best Cinematography	James Laxton	Nominated	
Houston Film Critics Society	January 6, 2017	Best Original Score	Nicholas Britell	Nominated	
Houston Film Critics Society	January 6, 2017	Best Screenplay	Barry Jenkins and Tarell Alvin McCraney	Nominated	
Houston Film Critics Society	January 6, 2017	Best Poster	Moonlight	Nominated	
Independent Spirit Awards	February 25, 2017	Best Film	Moonlight	Won	
Independent Spirit Awards	February 25, 2017	Best Director	Barry Jenkins	Won	
Independent Spirit Awards	February 25, 2017	Best Screenplay	Barry Jenkins and Tarell Alvin McCraney	Won	
Independent Spirit Awards	February 25, 2017	Best Cinematography	James Laxton	Won	
Independent Spirit Awards	February 25, 2017	Best Editing	Joi McMillon and Nat Sanders	Won	
Independent Spirit Awards	February 25, 2017	Robert Altman Award	Barry Jenkins, Yesi Ramirez, Mahershala Ali, Patrick Decile, Naomie Harris, Alex Hibbert, André Holland, Jharrel Jerome, Janelle Monáe, Jaden Piner, Trevante Rhodes and Ashton Sanders	Won	
International Film Festival Rotterdam	February 3, 2017	Warsteiner Audience Award	Moonlight	Won	
International Film Music Critics Association	February 23, 2017	Best Original Score for a Drama Film	Nicholas Britell	Nominated	
Irish Film & Television Awards	April 8, 2017	International Film	Moonlight	Won	
London Film Critics Circle	January 22, 2017	Film of the Year	Moonlight	Nominated	
London Film Critics Circle	January 22, 2017	Director of the Year	Barry Jenkins	Nominated	
London Film Critics Circle	January 22, 2017	Supporting Actor of the Year	Mahershala Ali	Won (Note: Tied with Tom Bennett for Love & Friendship)	
London Film Critics Circle	January 22, 2017	Supporting Actress of the Year	Naomie Harris	Won	
London Film Critics Circle	January 22, 2017	Screenwriter of the Year	Barry Jenkins	Nominated	
London Film Critics Circle	January 22, 2017	British/Irish Actress of the Year	Naomie Harris (also for Collateral Beauty and Our Kind of Traitor)	Nominated	
London Film Critics Circle	January 22, 2017	Technical Achievement	Joi McMillon and Nat Sanders (editing)	Nominated	
Los Angeles Film Critics Association	December 4, 2016	Best Film	Moonlight	Won	
Los Angeles Film Critics Association	December 4, 2016	Best Director	Barry Jenkins	Won	
Los Angeles Film Critics Association	December 4, 2016	Best Supporting Actor	Mahershala Ali	Won	
Los Angeles Film Critics Association	December 4, 2016	Best Cinematography	James Laxton	Won	
Mar del Plata International Film Festival	November 27, 2016	Best Feature Film	Moonlight	Nominated	
Mar del Plata International Film Festival	November 27, 2016	Best Actor	Mahershala Ali	Won	
Mill Valley Film Festival	October 16, 2016	U.S. Cinema: Audience Favorite	Barry Jenkins	Won	
MTV Movie & TV Awards	May 7, 2017	Best Kiss	Ashton Sanders and Jharrel Jerome	Won	
MTV Movie & TV Awards	May 7, 2017	Tearjerker	Paula (Naomie Harris) tells Chiron (Trevante Rhodes) that she loves him	Nominated	
MTV Movie & TV Awards	May 7, 2017	Best American Story	Moonlight	Nominated	
NAACP Image Awards	February 11, 2017	Outstanding Motion Picture	Moonlight	Nominated	
NAACP Image Awards	February 11, 2017	Outstanding Supporting Actor in a Motion Picture	Mahershala Ali	Won	
NAACP Image Awards	February 11, 2017	Outstanding Supporting Actor in a Motion Picture	Trevante Rhodes	Nominated	
NAACP Image Awards	February 11, 2017	Outstanding Independent Picture	Moonlight	Won	
NAACP Image Awards	February 11, 2017	Outstanding Directing in a Motion Picture	Barry Jenkins	Won	
NAACP Image Awards	February 11, 2017	Outstanding Writing in a Motion Picture	Barry Jenkins	Won	
National Board of Review	January 4, 2017	Best Director	Barry Jenkins	Won	
National Board of Review	January 4, 2017	Best Supporting Actress	Naomie Harris	Won	
National Society of Film Critics	January 7, 2017	Best Film	Moonlight	Won	
National Society of Film Critics	January 7, 2017	Best Director	Barry Jenkins	Won	
National Society of Film Critics	January 7, 2017	Best Supporting Actor	Mahershala Ali	Won	
National Society of Film Critics	January 7, 2017	Best Supporting Actress	Naomie Harris	3rd Place	
National Society of Film Critics	January 7, 2017	Best Screenplay	Barry Jenkins	2nd Place	
National Society of Film Critics	January 7, 2017	Best Cinematography	James Laxton	Won	
New York Film Critics Circle	December 1, 2016	Best Director	Barry Jenkins	Won	
New York Film Critics Circle	December 1, 2016	Best Supporting Actor	Mahershala Ali	Won	
New York Film Critics Circle	December 1, 2016	Best Cinematography	James Laxton	Won	
New York Film Critics Online	December 11, 2016	Best Picture	Moonlight	Won	
New York Film Critics Online	December 11, 2016	Best Director	Barry Jenkins	Won	
New York Film Critics Online	December 11, 2016	Best Supporting Actor	Mahershala Ali	Won	
New York Film Critics Online	December 11, 2016	Best Screenplay	Barry Jenkins	Won	
New York Film Critics Online	December 11, 2016	Best Cinematography	James Laxton	Won	
New York Film Critics Online	December 11, 2016	Best Ensemble Cast	The cast of Moonlight	Won	
Online Film Critics Society	January 3, 2017	Best Picture	Moonlight	Won	
Online Film Critics Society	January 3, 2017	Best Director	Barry Jenkins	Won	
Online Film Critics Society	January 3, 2017	Best Supporting Actor	Mahershala Ali	Won	
Online Film Critics Society	January 3, 2017	Best Supporting Actress	Naomie Harris	Won	
Online Film Critics Society	January 3, 2017	Best Adapted Screenplay	Barry Jenkins and Tarell Alvin McCraney	Nominated	
Online Film Critics Society	January 3, 2017	Best Editing	Joi McMillon and Nat Sanders	Nominated	
Online Film Critics Society	January 3, 2017	Best Cinematography	James Laxton	Nominated	
Palm Springs International Film Festival	January 2, 2017	Breakthrough Performance Award	Mahershala Ali	Won	
Producers Guild of America	January 28, 2017	Best Theatrical Motion Picture	Dede Gardner, Jeremy Kleiner, and Adele Romanski	Nominated	
San Diego Film Critics Society	December 12, 2016	Best Film	Moonlight	Nominated	
San Diego Film Critics Society	December 12, 2016	Best Director	Barry Jenkins	Nominated	
San Diego Film Critics Society	December 12, 2016	Best Supporting Actor	Mahershala Ali	Won (Note: Tied with Ben Foster for Hell or High Water)	
San Diego Film Critics Society	December 12, 2016	Best Original Screenplay	Barry Jenkins and Tarell Alvin McCraney	Nominated	
San Diego Film Critics Society	December 12, 2016	Best Cinematography	James Laxton	Runner-up (Note: Tied with Linus Sandgren for La La Land)	
San Diego Film Critics Society	December 12, 2016	Best Ensemble	The cast of Moonlight	Nominated	
San Francisco Film Critics Circle	December 11, 2016	Best Film	Moonlight	Won	
San Francisco Film Critics Circle	December 11, 2016	Best Director	Barry Jenkins	Won	
San Francisco Film Critics Circle	December 11, 2016	Best Supporting Actor	Mahershala Ali	Won	
San Francisco Film Critics Circle	December 11, 2016	Best Supporting Actress	Naomie Harris	Nominated	
San Francisco Film Critics Circle	December 11, 2016	Best Original Screenplay	Barry Jenkins	Won (Note: Tied with Kenneth Lonergan for Manchester by the Sea)	
San Francisco Film Critics Circle	December 11, 2016	Best Cinematography	James Laxton	Won	
San Francisco Film Critics Circle	December 11, 2016	Best Original Score	Nicholas Britell	Nominated	
San Francisco Film Critics Circle	December 11, 2016	Best Film Editing	Joi McMillon and Nat Sanders	Won (Note: Tied with Joe Walker for Arrival)	
Santa Barbara International Film Festival	February 3, 2017	Virtuosos Award	Naomie Harris	Won	
Santa Barbara International Film Festival	February 3, 2017	Virtuosos Award	Mahershala Ali	Won	
Santa Barbara International Film Festival	February 3, 2017	Virtuosos Award	Janelle Monáe (also for Hidden Figures)	Won	
Satellite Awards	February 19, 2017	Best Film	Moonlight	Nominated	
Satellite Awards	February 19, 2017	Best Director	Barry Jenkins	Nominated	
Satellite Awards	February 19, 2017	Best Supporting Actor	Mahershala Ali	Nominated	
Satellite Awards	February 19, 2017	Best Supporting Actress	Naomie Harris	Won	
Satellite Awards	February 19, 2017	Best Original Screenplay	Barry Jenkins	Won	
Satellite Awards	February 19, 2017	Best Cinematography	James Laxton	Nominated	
Satellite Awards	February 19, 2017	Best Film Editing	Joi McMillon and Nat Sanders	Nominated	
Screen Actors Guild Awards	January 29, 2017	Outstanding Performance by a Male Actor in a Supporting Role	Mahershala Ali	Won	
Screen Actors Guild Awards	January 29, 2017	Outstanding Performance by a Female Actor in a Supporting Role	Naomie Harris	Nominated	
Screen Actors Guild Awards	January 29, 2017	Outstanding Performance by a Cast in a Motion Picture	The cast of Moonlight	Nominated	
Seattle Film Critics Society	January 5, 2017	Best Picture of the Year	Moonlight	Won	
Seattle Film Critics Society	January 5, 2017	Best Director	Barry Jenkins	Won	
Seattle Film Critics Society	January 5, 2017	Best Actor in a Supporting Role	Mahershala Ali	Won	
Seattle Film Critics Society	January 5, 2017	Best Actress in a Supporting Role	Naomie Harris	Nominated	
Seattle Film Critics Society	January 5, 2017	Best Screenplay	Barry Jenkins and Tarell Alvin McCraney	Won	
Seattle Film Critics Society	January 5, 2017	Best Cinematography	James Laxton	Nominated	
Seattle Film Critics Society	January 5, 2017	Best Film Editing	Joi McMillon and Nat Sanders	Won	
Seattle Film Critics Society	January 5, 2017	Best Original Score	Nicholas Britell	Nominated	
Seattle Film Critics Society	January 5, 2017	Best Youth Performance	Alex Hibbert	Nominated	
Seattle Film Critics Society	January 5, 2017	Best Ensemble Cast	The cast of Moonlight	Won	
St. Louis Film Critics Association	December 18, 2016	Best Film	Moonlight	Nominated	
St. Louis Film Critics Association	December 18, 2016	Best Director	Barry Jenkins	Nominated	
St. Louis Film Critics Association	December 18, 2016	Best Supporting Actor	Mahershala Ali	Won	
St. Louis Film Critics Association	December 18, 2016	Best Supporting Actress	Naomie Harris	Nominated	
St. Louis Film Critics Association	December 18, 2016	Best Original Screenplay	Barry Jenkins	Nominated	
St. Louis Film Critics Association	December 18, 2016	Best Editing	Joi McMillon and Nat Sanders	Nominated	
St. Louis Film Critics Association	December 18, 2016	Best Cinematography	James Laxton	Nominated	
St. Louis Film Critics Association	December 18, 2016	Best Music/Score	Nicholas Britell	Nominated	
Toronto Film Critics Association	December 11, 2016	Best Film	Moonlight	Won	
Toronto Film Critics Association	December 11, 2016	Best Supporting Actor	Mahershala Ali	Won	
Toronto Film Critics Association	December 11, 2016	Best Supporting Actress	Naomie Harris	Runner-up	
Toronto Film Critics Association	December 11, 2016	Best Director	Barry Jenkins	Runner-up	
Toronto Film Critics Association	December 11, 2016	Best Screenplay	Barry Jenkins	Runner-up	
Toronto International Film Festival	September 18, 2016	Platform Prize	Barry Jenkins	Nominated	
USC Scripter Awards	February 11, 2017	Best Screenplay	Barry Jenkins and Tarell Alvin McCraney	Won	
Vancouver Film Critics Circle	December 20, 2016	Best Film	Moonlight	Nominated	
Vancouver Film Critics Circle	December 20, 2016	Best Supporting Actor	Mahershala Ali	Won	
Vancouver Film Critics Circle	December 20, 2016	Best Supporting Actress	Naomie Harris	Nominated	
Vancouver Film Critics Circle	December 20, 2016	Best Screenplay	Barry Jenkins	Nominated	
Village Voice Film Poll	December 21, 2016	Best Film	Moonlight	Won	
Village Voice Film Poll	December 21, 2016	Best Director	Barry Jenkins	Won	
Village Voice Film Poll	December 21, 2016	Best Supporting Actor	Mahershala Ali	Won	
Washington D.C. Area Film Critics Association	December 5, 2016	Best Film	Moonlight	Nominated	
Washington D.C. Area Film Critics Association	December 5, 2016	Best Director	Barry Jenkins	Nominated	
Washington D.C. Area Film Critics Association	December 5, 2016	Best Supporting Actor	Mahershala Ali	Won	
Washington D.C. Area Film Critics Association	December 5, 2016	Best Supporting Actress	Naomie Harris	Nominated	
Washington D.C. Area Film Critics Association	December 5, 2016	Best Original Screenplay	Barry Jenkins and Tarell Alvin McCraney	Nominated	
Washington D.C. Area Film Critics Association	December 5, 2016	Best Ensemble	The cast of Moonlight	Nominated	
Washington D.C. Area Film Critics Association	December 5, 2016	Best Cinematography	James Laxton	Nominated	
Washington D.C. Area Film Critics Association	December 5, 2016	Best Editing	Joi McMillon and Nat Sanders	Nominated	
Washington D.C. Area Film Critics Association	December 5, 2016	Best Score	Nicholas Britell	Nominated	
Women Film Critics Circle	December 19, 2016	Josephine Baker Award	Moonlight	Nominated	
Writers Guild of America Awards	February 19, 2017	Best Original Screenplay	Barry Jenkins and Tarell Alvin McCraney	Won	
Young Artist Awards	March 17, 2017	Best Performance in a Feature Film – Supporting Teen Actor	Alex Hibbert	Nominated	

== See also ==
- 2016 in film
