= List of accolades received by Moana (2016 film) =

Moana
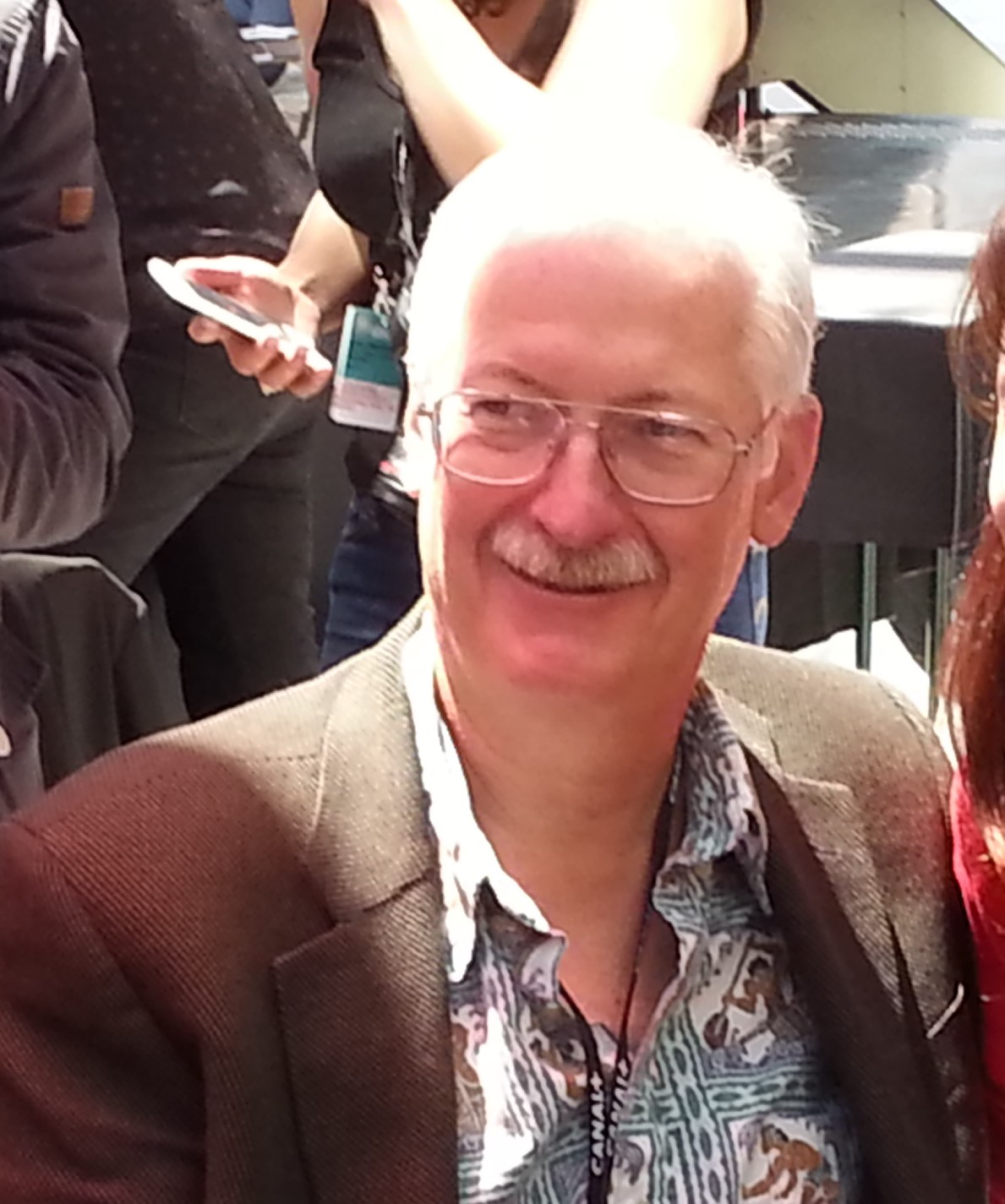
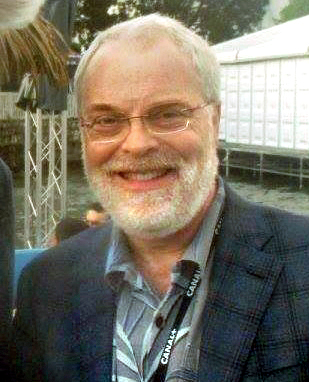
- John Musker (left) and Ron Clements (right) garnered many accolades for co-directing the film.
Awards and nominations
Award	Wins	Nominations
AARP Annual Movies for Grownups Awards	0	1
Academy Awards	0	2
ACE Eddie Awards	0	1
American Music Awards	1	1
Alliance of Women Film Journalists	1	2
Annie Awards	2	6
Austin Film Critics Association	0	1
Billboard Music Awards	1	2
Black Reel Awards	0	1
British Academy Film Awards	0	1
Chicago Film Critics Association	0	1
Cinema Audio Society Awards	0	1
Critics' Choice Awards	0	2
Dallas-Fort Worth Film Critics Association	1	1
Empire Awards	0	2
Florida Film Critics Circle	0	1
Golden Globe Awards	0	2
Grammy Awards	1	2
Hollywood Music in Media Awards	0	2
Houston Film Critics Society	0	2
Nickelodeon Kids' Choice Awards	0	4
MPSE Golden Reel Awards	1	2
NAACP Image Awards	0	1
Online Film Critics Society	0	1
Producers Guild of America	0	1
San Diego Film Critics Society	0	1
San Francisco Film Critics Circle	0	1
Satellite Awards	0	1
Saturn Awards	0	1
St. Louis Gateway Film Critics Association	0	3
Teen Choice Awards	2	4
Village Voice Film Poll	1	1
Visual Effects Society Awards	2	4
Washington D.C. Area Film Critics Association	0	2
Women Film Critics Circle	1	1

Totals (Note: Certain award groups do not simply award one winner. They acknowledge several different recipients, have runners-up, and have third place. Since this is a specific recognition and is different from losing an award, runner-up mentions are considered wins in this award tally. For simplification and to avoid errors, each award in this list has been presumed to have had a prior nomination.)
- Wins: 14
- Nominations: 63

Moana is a 2016 American animated musical fantasy adventure film produced by Walt Disney Animation Studios and released by Walt Disney Pictures. The film was directed by Ron Clements and John Musker, with Don Hall and Chris Williams as co-directors. Starring the voices of Auliʻi Cravalho and Dwayne Johnson, the film focuses on the story of Moana, the strong-willed daughter of the chief in a Polynesian tribe, who is chosen by the ocean itself to reunite a mystical relic with a goddess. When a blight strikes her island, Moana sets sail in search of Maui, a legendary demigod, in the hope of saving her people.

The film had its world premiere at El Capitan Theatre in Los Angeles on November 14, 2016 and was released to theaters on November 23, 2016. The review aggregator Rotten Tomatoes reported 96% positive film-critic reviews, based on 218 reviews, with an average rating of 7.9/10 and Metacritic gave a score of 81 out of 100, based on 44 reviews.

Moana have received many nominations and awards, the majority for Best Animated Feature category and for Auliʻi Cravalho performance. At the 44th Annie Awards, Moana received six nominations and won two including Outstanding Achievement, Animated Effects in an Animated Production and Outstanding Achievement for Voice Acting in an Animated Feature Production. Also Lin-Manuel Miranda won a Grammy Award for Best Song Written for Visual Media for "How Far I'll Go", performed by Auliʻi Cravalho.

== Accolades ==
Award	Date of ceremony	Category	Recipients	Result	Ref.
AARP Annual Movies for Grownups Awards	February 6, 2017	Best Movie for Grownups who Refuse to Grow Up	Moana	Nominated	
Academy Awards	February 26, 2017	Best Animated Feature	John Musker, Ron Clements, and Osnat Shurer	Nominated	
Academy Awards	February 26, 2017	Best Original Song	Lin-Manuel Miranda (for "How Far I'll Go")	Nominated	
ACE Eddie Awards	January 27, 2017	Best Edited Animated Feature Film	Jeff Draheim	Nominated	
American Music Awards	November 18, 2017	Top Soundtrack	Moana	Won	
Alliance of Women Film Journalists	December 21, 2016	Best Animated Film	Ron Clements, Don Hall, John Musker, and Chris Williams	Nominated	
Alliance of Women Film Journalists	December 21, 2016	Best Animated Female	Auliʻi Cravalho	Won (Note: Tied with Ginnifer Goodwin for Zootopia)	
Annie Awards	February 4, 2017	Best Animated Feature	Moana	Nominated	
Annie Awards	February 4, 2017	Outstanding Achievement, Animated Effects in an Animated Production	Ian J. Coony, John M. Kosnik, Blair Pierpont, Erin V. Ramos, and Marlon West	Won	
Annie Awards	February 4, 2017	Outstanding Achievement for Character Design in an Animated Feature Production	Jin Kim and Bill Schwab	Nominated	
Annie Awards	February 4, 2017	Outstanding Achievement for Storyboarding in an Animated Feature Production	Normand Lemay	Nominated	
Annie Awards	February 4, 2017	Outstanding Achievement for Voice Acting in an Animated Feature Production	Auliʻi Cravalho	Won (Note: Tied with Jason Bateman for Zootopia)	
Annie Awards	February 4, 2017	Outstanding Achievement for Editorial in an Animated Feature Production	Jeff Draheim	Nominated	
Austin Film Critics Association	December 28, 2016	Best Animated Film	Moana	Nominated	
Billboard Music Awards	May 21, 2017	Top Soundtrack/Cast Album	Moana	Nominated	
Billboard Music Awards	May 20, 2018	Top Soundtrack/Cast Album	Moana	Won	
Black Reel Awards	February 16, 2017	Outstanding Voice Performance	Dwayne Johnson	Nominated	
British Academy Film Awards	February 12, 2017	Best Animated Film	Ron Clements and John Musker	Nominated	
Chicago Film Critics Association	December 15, 2016	Best Animated Film	Moana	Nominated	
Cinema Audio Society Awards	February 18, 2017	Outstanding Achievement in Sound Mixing for a Motion Picture – Animated	David Boucher, Scott Curtis, David E. Fluhr, Gabriel Guy, and Paul McGrath	Nominated	
Critics' Choice Awards	December 11, 2016	Best Animated Feature	Moana	Nominated	
Critics' Choice Awards	December 11, 2016	Best Song	Lin-Manuel Miranda (for "How Far I'll Go")	Nominated	
Dallas–Fort Worth Film Critics Association	December 13, 2016	Best Animated Film	Moana	3rd Place	
Empire Awards	March 19, 2017	Best Animated Film	Moana	Nominated	
Empire Awards	March 19, 2017	Best Soundtrack	Moana	Nominated	
Florida Film Critics Circle	December 23, 2016	Best Animated Film	Moana	Nominated	
Golden Globe Awards	January 8, 2017	Best Animated Feature Film	Moana	Nominated	
Golden Globe Awards	January 8, 2017	Best Original Song	Lin-Manuel Miranda (for "How Far I'll Go")	Nominated	
Grammy Awards	January 28, 2018	Best Compilation Soundtrack For Visual Media	Moana	Nominated	
Grammy Awards	January 28, 2018	Best Song Written For Visual Media	Lin-Manuel Miranda (for "How Far I'll Go")	Won	
Hollywood Music in Media Awards	November 17, 2016	Best Original Score – Animated Film	Mark Mancina	Nominated	
Hollywood Music in Media Awards	November 17, 2016	Best Song – Animated Film	Opetaia Foa'i, Mark Mancina, and Lin-Manuel Miranda (for "We Know the Way")	Nominated	
Houston Film Critics Society	January 6, 2017	Best Animated Feature Film	Moana	Nominated	
Houston Film Critics Society	January 6, 2017	Best Original Song	Lin-Manuel Miranda (for "How Far I'll Go")	Nominated	
2017 Kids' Choice Awards	March 11, 2017	Favorite Animated Movie	Moana	Nominated	
2017 Kids' Choice Awards	March 11, 2017	Favorite Voice from an Animated Movie	Dwayne Johnson	Nominated	
2017 Kids' Choice Awards	March 11, 2017	Favorite Frenemies	Auliʻi Cravalho and Dwayne Johnson	Nominated	
2017 Kids' Choice Awards	March 11, 2017	Favorite Soundtrack	Moana	Nominated	
MPSE Golden Reel Awards	February 19, 2017	Feature Animation	Jonathan Borland, Thom Brennan, Pascal Garneau, Earl Ghaffari, Lee Gilmore, Matthew Harrison, Tim Nielsen, Dan Pinder, Shelley Roden, and John Roesch	Won	
MPSE Golden Reel Awards	February 19, 2017	Feature Musical	Earl Ghaffari and Daniel Pinder	Nominated	
NAACP Image Awards	February 11, 2017	Outstanding Character Voice-Over Performance	Dwayne Johnson	Nominated	
Online Film Critics Society	January 3, 2017	Best Animated Feature	Moana	Nominated	
Producers Guild of America	January 28, 2017	Best Animated Motion Picture	Osnat Shurer	Nominated	
San Diego Film Critics Society	December 12, 2016	Best Animated Film	Moana	Nominated	
San Francisco Film Critics Circle	December 11, 2016	Best Animated Feature	Moana	Nominated	
Satellite Awards	February 19, 2017	Best Animated or Mixed Media Feature	Moana	Nominated	
Saturn Awards	June 28, 2017	Best Animated Film	Moana	Nominated	
St. Louis Gateway Film Critics Association	December 18, 2016	Best Animated Film	Moana	Nominated	
St. Louis Gateway Film Critics Association	December 18, 2016	Best Soundtrack	Moana	Nominated	
St. Louis Gateway Film Critics Association	December 18, 2016	Best Song	"How Far I'll Go"	Nominated	
St. Louis Gateway Film Critics Association	December 18, 2016	Best Song	"You're Welcome"	Nominated	
Teen Choice Awards	August 13, 2017	Choice Fantasy Movie	Moana	Nominated	
Teen Choice Awards	August 13, 2017	Choice Fantasy Movie Actor	Dwayne Johnson	Won	
Teen Choice Awards	August 13, 2017	Choice Fantasy Movie Actress	Auliʻi Cravalho	Nominated	
Teen Choice Awards	August 13, 2017	Choice Breakout Movie Star	Auliʻi Cravalho	Won	
Village Voice Film Poll	January 6, 2017	Best Animated Feature	Moana	8th Place	
Visual Effects Society Awards	February 7, 2017	Outstanding Visual Effects in an Animated Feature	Hank Driskill, Ian Gooding, Nicole P. Hearon, and Kyle Odermatt	Nominated	
Visual Effects Society Awards	February 7, 2017	Outstanding Animated Performance in an Animated Feature	Mack Kablan, Nikki Mull, Matthew Schiller, and Marc Thyng (for "Maui")	Nominated	
Visual Effects Society Awards	February 7, 2017	Outstanding Created Environment in an Animated Feature	Rob Dressel, Andy Harkness, Brien Hindman, and Larry Wu (for "Motonui Island")	Won	
Visual Effects Society Awards	February 7, 2017	Outstanding Effects Simulations in an Animated Feature	Marc Henry Bryant, David Hutchins, John M. Kosnik, and Dale Mayeda	Won	
Washington D.C. Area Film Critics Association	December 5, 2016	Best Animated Feature	Moana	Nominated	
Washington D.C. Area Film Critics Association	December 5, 2016	Best Voice Performance	Auliʻi Cravalho	Nominated	
Women Film Critics Circle	December 19, 2016	Best Animated Feature	Moana	Won	

== See also ==
- 2016 in film
