= Washington D.C. Area Film Critics Association Awards 2016 =

Annual US film awards ceremony

15th WAFCA Awards
- Date: December 5, 2016

Highlights
- Best Film: La La Land
- Best Director: Damien Chazelle for La La Land
- Best Actor: Casey Affleck
- Best Actress: Natalie Portman

The 15th Washington D.C. Area Film Critics Association Awards were announced on December 5, 2016.

== Winners and nominees ==
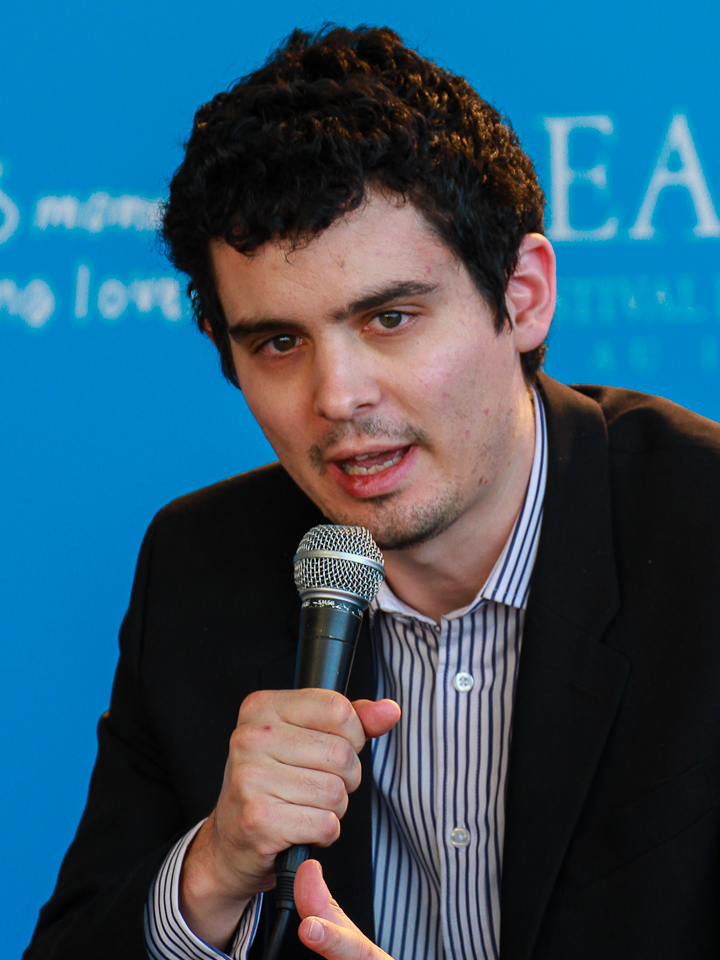
Damien Chazelle, Best Director and Best Original Screenplay winner

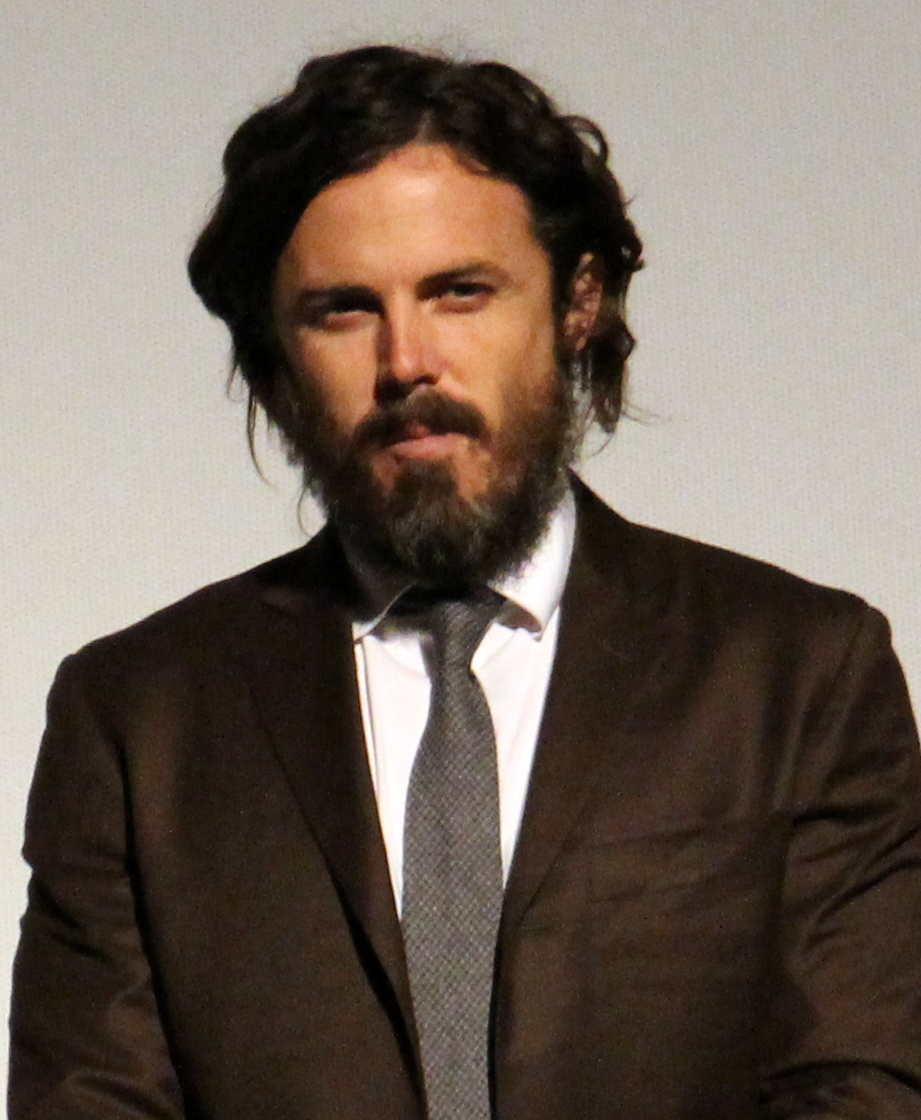
Casey Affleck, Best Actor winner

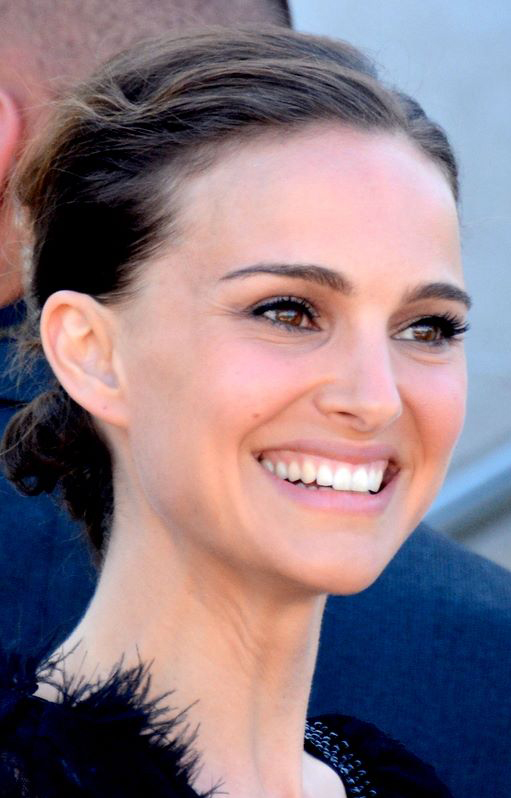
Natalie Portman, Best Actress winner

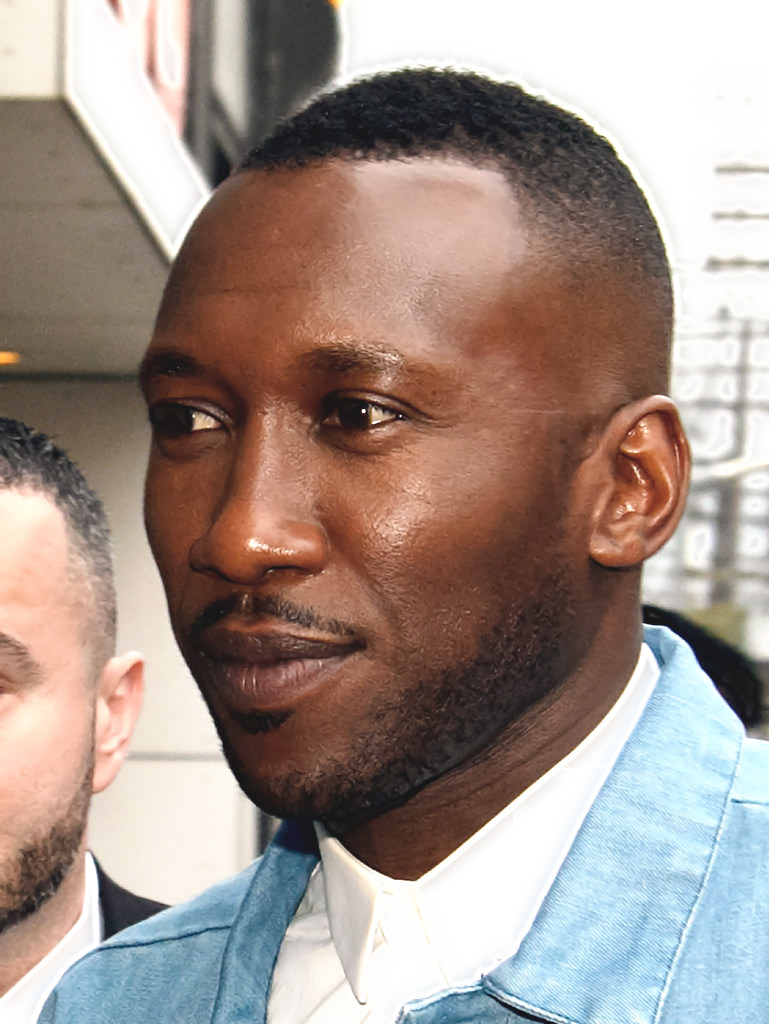
Mahershala Ali, Best Supporting Actor winner

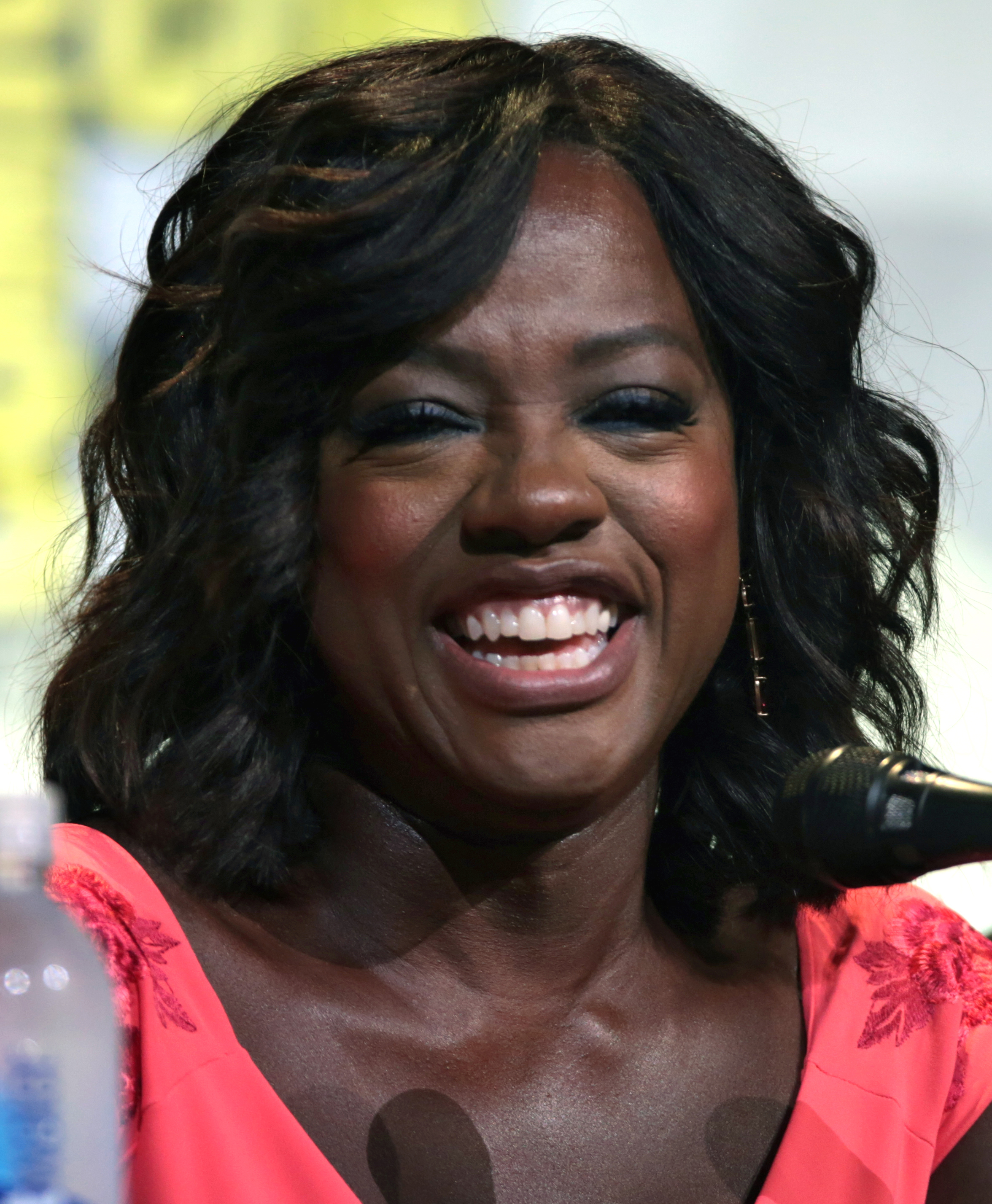
Viola Davis, Best Supporting Actress winner

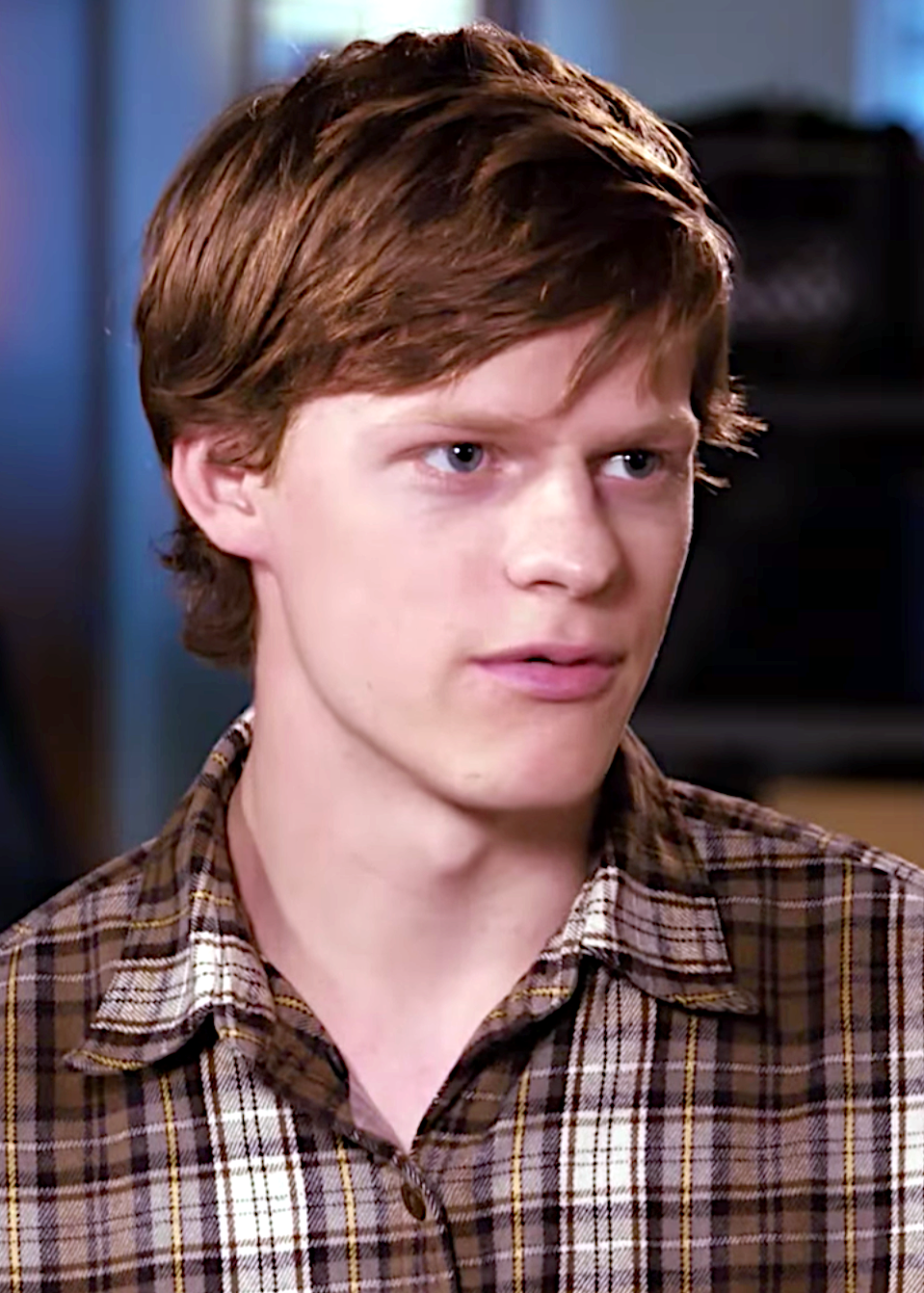
Lucas Hedges, Best Youth Performance winner

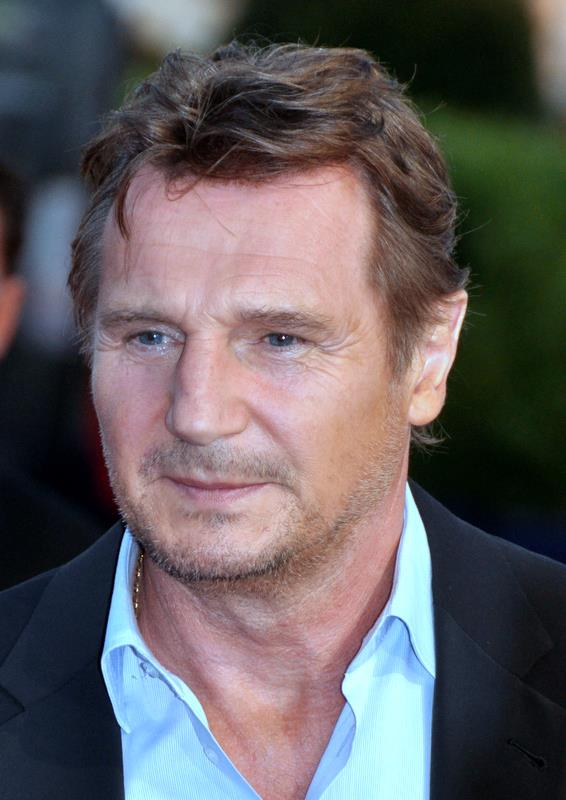
Liam Neeson, Best Animated Voice Performance winner

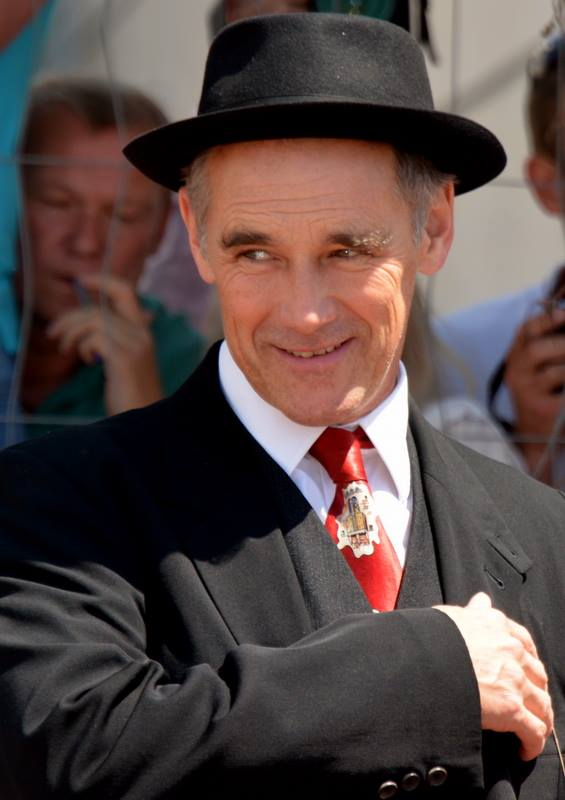
Mark Rylance, Best Motion Capture Performance winner

Best Film

- La La Land

- Arrival
- Hell or High Water
- Manchester by the Sea
- Moonlight

Best Director

- Damien Chazelle – La La Land

- Barry Jenkins – Moonlight
- Kenneth Lonergan – Manchester by the Sea
- David Mackenzie – Hell or High Water
- Denis Villeneuve – Arrival

Best Actor

- Casey Affleck – Manchester by the Sea

- Joel Edgerton – Loving
- Andrew Garfield – Hacksaw Ridge
- Ryan Gosling – La La Land
- Denzel Washington – Fences

Best Actress

- Natalie Portman – Jackie

- Amy Adams – Arrival
- Annette Bening – 20th Century Women
- Ruth Negga – Loving
- Emma Stone – La La Land

Best Supporting Actor

- Mahershala Ali – Moonlight

- Jeff Bridges – Hell or High Water
- Ben Foster – Hell or High Water
- Lucas Hedges – Manchester by the Sea
- Michael Shannon – Nocturnal Animals

Best Supporting Actress

- Viola Davis – Fences

- Greta Gerwig – 20th Century Women
- Naomie Harris – Moonlight
- Molly Shannon – Other People
- Michelle Williams – Manchester by the Sea

Best Adapted Screenplay

- Eric Heisserer – Arrival

- Luke Davies – Lion
- Tom Ford – Nocturnal Animals
- Patrick Ness – A Monster Calls
- August Wilson – Fences

Best Original Screenplay

- Damien Chazelle – La La Land

- Barry Jenkins and Tarell Alvin McCraney – Moonlight
- Yorgos Lanthimos and Efthimis Filippou – The Lobster
- Kenneth Lonergan – Manchester by the Sea
- Taylor Sheridan – Hell or High Water

Best Ensemble

- Hell or High Water

- 20th Century Women
- Fences
- Manchester by the Sea
- Moonlight

Best Animated Film

- Kubo and the Two Strings

- Finding Dory
- Moana
- Sausage Party
- Zootopia

Best Documentary Film

- 13th

- Gleason
- I Am Not Your Negro
- O.J.: Made in America
- Weiner

Best Foreign Language Film

- Elle • France

- The Handmaiden • South Korea
- Julieta • Spain
- The Salesman • France / Iran
- Toni Erdmann • Austria / Germany

Best Art Direction

- David Wasco and Sandy Reynolds-Wasco – La La Land

- Stuart Craig and Anna Pinnock – Fantastic Beasts and Where to Find Them
- Paul Hotte and Patrice Vermette – Arrival
- Craig Lathrop – The Witch
- Véronique Melery and Jean Rabasse – Jackie

Best Cinematography

- Linus Sandgren – La La Land

- Stéphane Fontaine – Jackie
- James Laxton – Moonlight
- Seamus McGarvey – Nocturnal Animals
- Bradford Young – Arrival

Best Editing

- Tom Cross – La La Land

- Joi McMillon and Nat Sanders – Moonlight
- Blu Murray – Sully
- Sebastián Sepúlveda – Jackie
- Joe Walker – Arrival

Best Original Score

- Justin Hurwitz – La La Land

- Nicholas Britell – Moonlight
- Jóhann Jóhannsson – Arrival
- Mica Levi – Jackie
- Cliff Martinez – The Neon Demon

Best Youth Performance

- Lucas Hedges – Manchester by the Sea

- Lewis MacDougall – A Monster Calls
- Sunny Pawar – Lion
- Hailee Steinfeld – The Edge of Seventeen
- Anya Taylor-Joy – The Witch

Best Animated Voice Performance

- Liam Neeson – A Monster Calls

- Jason Bateman – Zootopia
- Auliʻi Cravalho – Moana
- Ellen DeGeneres – Finding Dory
- Ginnifer Goodwin – Zootopia

Best Motion Capture Performance

- Mark Rylance – The BFG

- Liam Neeson – A Monster Calls

The Joe Barber Award for Best Portrayal of Washington, D.C.

- Jackie

- Jason Bourne
- Loving
- Miss Sloane
- Snowden

== Multiple nominations and awards ==
These films had multiple nominations:

- 9 nominations: La La Land and Moonlight
- 8 nominations: Arrival and Manchester by the Sea
- 6 nominations: Hell or High Water and Jackie
- 4 nominations: Fences and A Monster Calls
- 3 nominations: 20th Century Women, Loving, Nocturnal Animals, and Zootopia
- 2 nominations: Finding Dory, Lion, Moana, and The Witch

The following films received multiple awards:

- 7 wins: La La Land
- 2 wins: Jackie and Manchester by the Sea
