= San Francisco Film Critics Circle Awards 2016 =

Annual US film awards ceremony

15th SFFCC Awards

December 11, 2016

Picture:
Moonlight

Animated Feature:
The Red Turtle

Documentary:
I Am Not Your Negro

Foreign Language Picture:
The Handmaiden

The 15th San Francisco Film Critics Circle Awards, honoring the best in film for 2016, were given on December 11, 2016.

== Winners ==
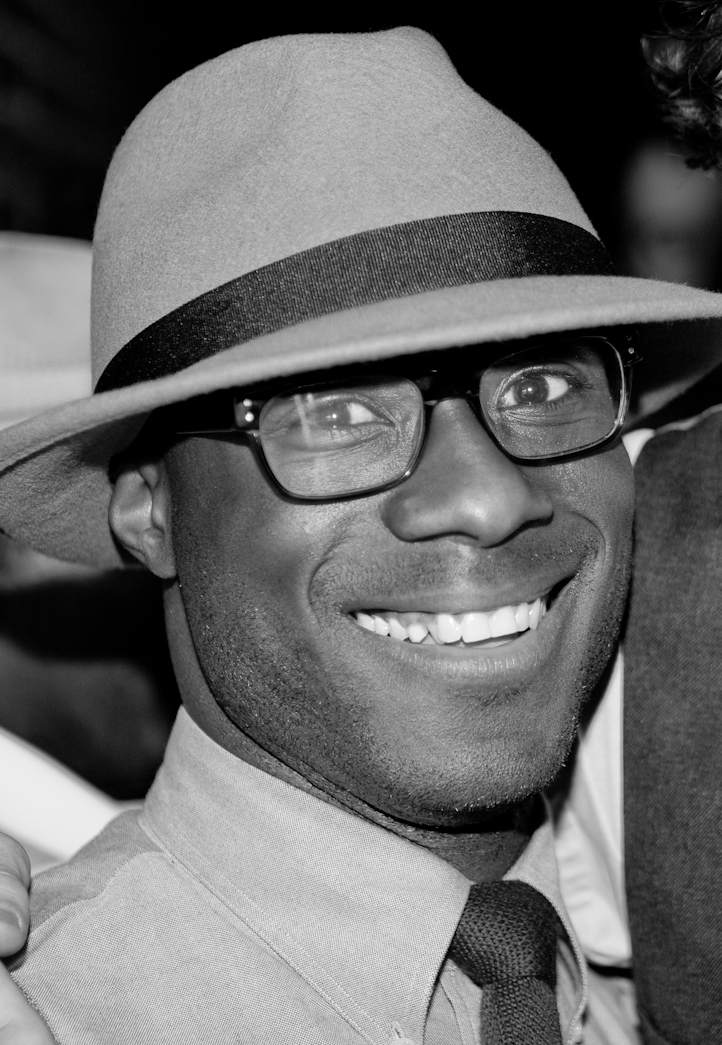
Barry Jenkins, Best Director winner

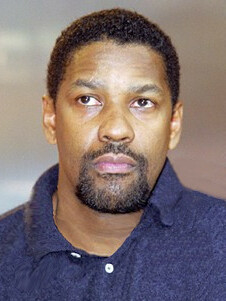
Denzel Washington, Best Actor winner

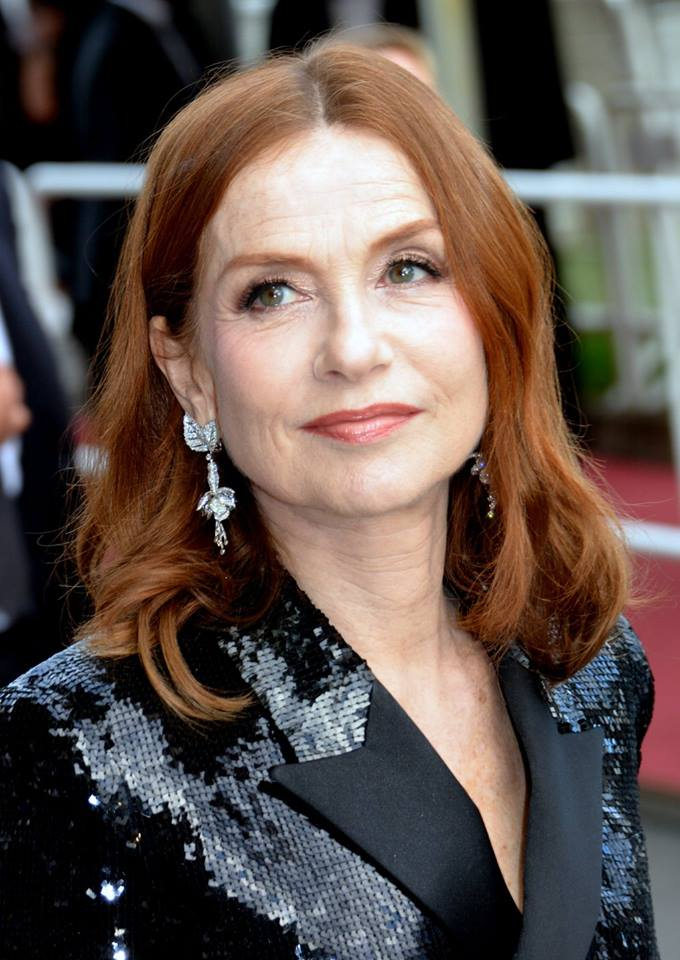
Isabelle Huppert, Best Actress winner

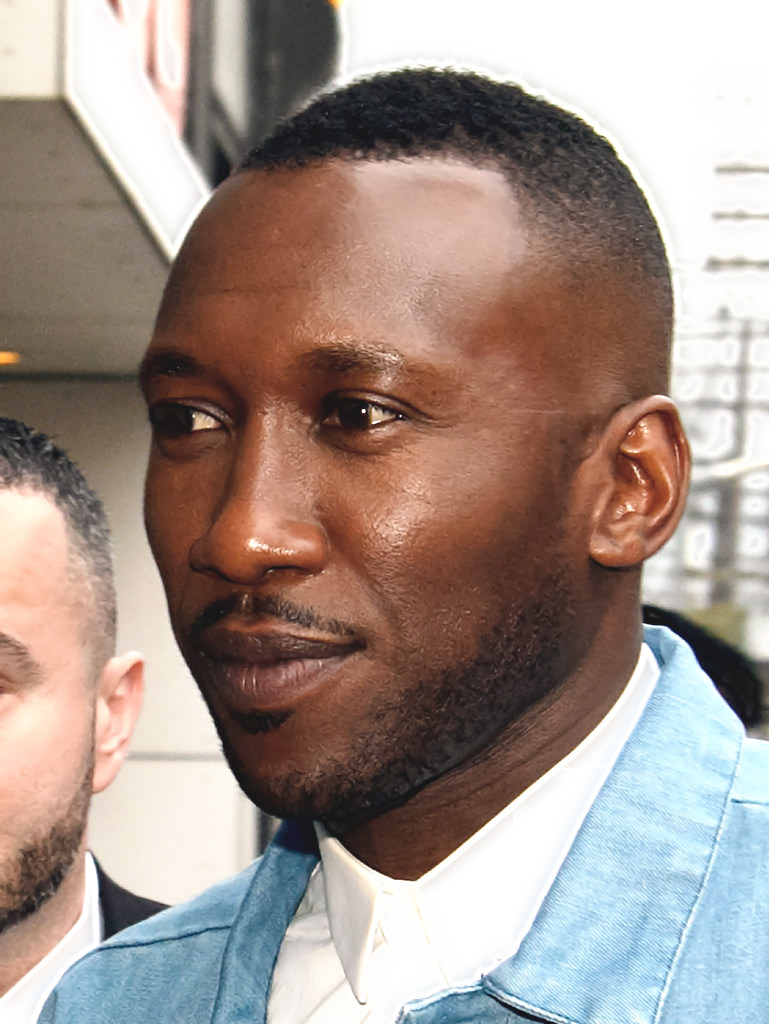
Mahershala Ali, Best Supporting Actor winner

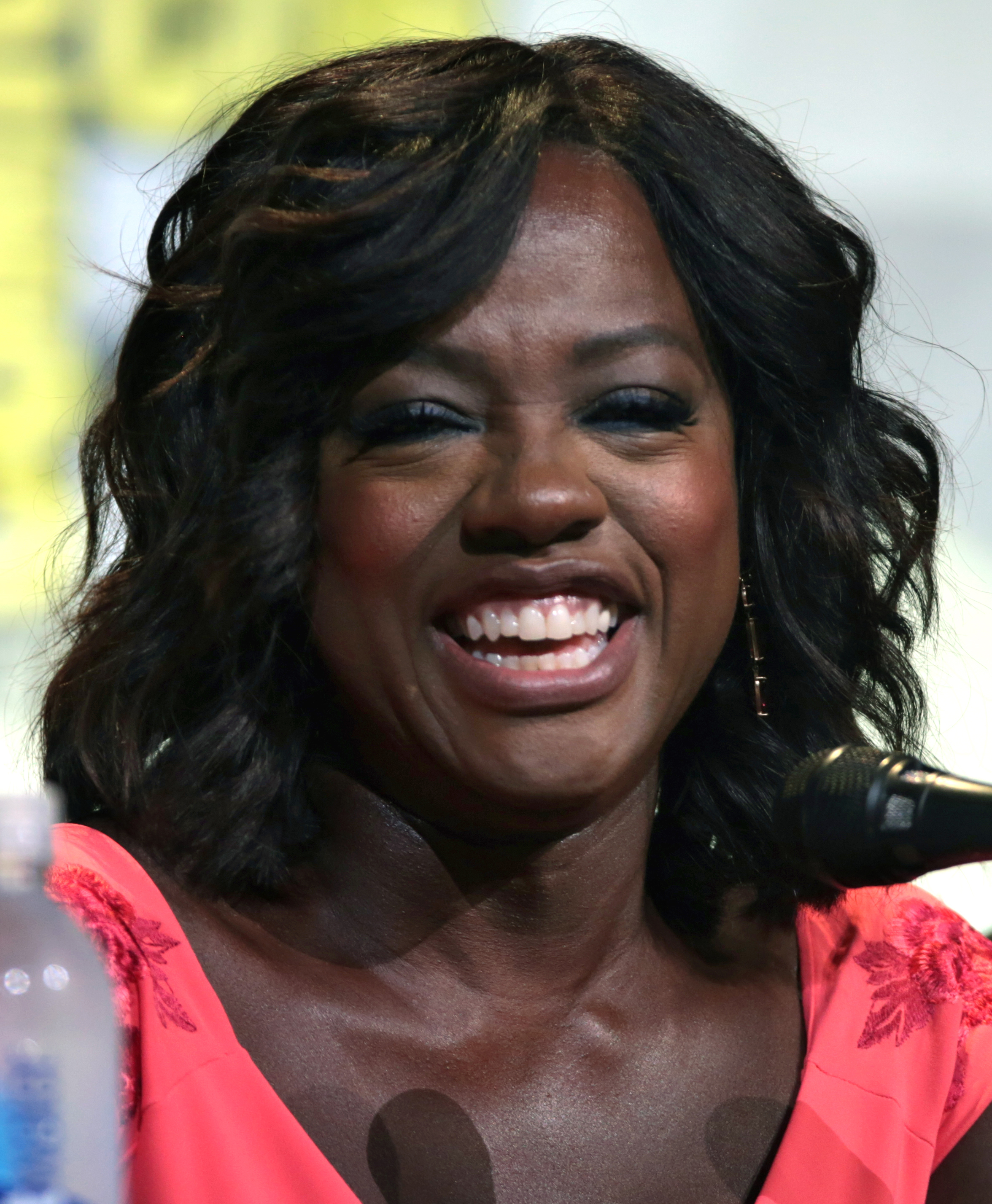
Viola Davis, Best Supporting Actress winner

These are the nominees for the 15th SFFCC Awards. Winners are listed at the top of each list:

| Best Film | Best Director |
|---|---|
| Moonlight; Arrival; Hell or High Water; La La Land; Manchester by the Sea | Barry Jenkins – Moonlight; Damien Chazelle – La La Land; Kenneth Lonergan – Manchester by the Sea; Jeff Nichols – Loving; Denis Villeneuve – Arrival |
| Best Actor | Best Actress |
| Denzel Washington – Fences; Casey Affleck – Manchester by the Sea; Joel Edgerton – Loving; Ryan Gosling – La La Land; Tom Hanks – Sully | Isabelle Huppert – Elle; Amy Adams – Arrival; Annette Bening – 20th Century Women; Ruth Negga – Loving; Natalie Portman – Jackie |
| Best Supporting Actor | Best Supporting Actress |
| Mahershala Ali – Moonlight; Jeff Bridges – Hell or High Water; Ralph Fiennes – A Bigger Splash; Ben Foster – Hell or High Water; Michael Shannon – Nocturnal Animals | Viola Davis – Fences; Greta Gerwig – 20th Century Women; Lily Gladstone – Certain Women; Naomie Harris – Moonlight; Michelle Williams – Manchester by the Sea |
| Best Screenplay – Adapted | Best Screenplay – Original |
| Eric Heisserer – Arrival; David Birke – Elle; Park Chan-wook and Chung Seo-kyung – The Handmaiden; Tom Ford – Nocturnal Animals; August Wilson – Fences | Barry Jenkins – Moonlight (TIE); Kenneth Lonergan – Manchester by the Sea (TIE); Damien Chazelle – La La Land; Yorgos Lanthimos and Efthimis Filippou – The Lobster; Taylor Sheridan – Hell or High Water |
| Best Animated Feature | Best Documentary Film |
| The Red Turtle; Finding Dory; Kubo and the Two Strings; Moana; Zootopia | I Am Not Your Negro; 13th; Cameraperson; Fire at Sea; O.J.: Made in America |
| Best Foreign Language Film | Best Cinematography |
| The Handmaiden; Elle; Neruda; The Salesman; Toni Erdmann | James Laxton – Moonlight; Stéphane Fontaine – Jackie; Rodrigo Prieto – Silence; Linus Sandgren – La La Land; Bradford Young – Arrival |
| Best Editing | Best Original Score |
| Joi McMillon and Nat Sanders – Moonlight (TIE); Joe Walker – Arrival (TIE); Tom Cross – La La Land; Jennifer Lame – Manchester by the Sea; Jake Roberts – Hell or High Water | Mica Levi – Jackie; Nicholas Britell – Moonlight; Nick Cave and Warren Ellis – Hell or High Water; Justin Hurwitz – La La Land; Jóhann Jóhannsson – Arrival |
| Best Production Design | |
| Seong-hie Ryu – The Handmaiden; Craig Lathrop – The Witch; Jean Rabasse – Jackie; Patrice Vermette – Arrival; David Wasco – La La Land | |

== Special awards ==
=== Special Citation Award for under-appreciated independent cinema ===
- The Fits

=== Marlon Riggs Award for courage & vision in the Bay Area film community ===
- Joshua Grannell (a.k.a. Peaches Christ)
