= Medicine for Melancholy =

- Film poster
- Directed by: Barry Jenkins
- Written by: Barry Jenkins
- Produced by: Justin Barber; Cherie Saulter
- Starring: Wyatt Cenac; Tracey Heggins; Elizabeth Acker
- Cinematography: James Laxton
- Edited by: Nat Sanders
- Production companies: Strike Anywhere; Bandry
- Distributed by: IFC Films
- Release dates: March 7, 2008 (SXSW); January 30, 2009 (United States)
- Running time: 88 minutes
- Country: United States
- Language: English
- Budget: $15,000
- Box office: $111,551

Medicine for Melancholy is a 2008 romantic drama film written and directed by Barry Jenkins in his feature directorial debut. The film stars Wyatt Cenac, Tracey Heggins, and Elizabeth Acker.

Medicine for Melancholy had its world premiere at South by Southwest on March 7, 2008. The film was theatrically released in the United States on January 30, 2009.

== Plot ==
Medicine for Melancholy chronicles the one-day romance of Micah (Wyatt Cenac) and Jo (Tracey Heggins), two black twenty-somethings who have a one-night stand and end up spending a full day and night together despite Jo's long-distance relationship with a wealthy white gallery owner. After a party, the characters wake up in someone else's bed and head their separate ways. Jo leaves her wallet in their shared taxi and they reconnect when he returns it to her at her apartment. Throughout the day, Micah and Jo visit the Museum of the African Diaspora, stumble upon an affordable housing coalition meeting and attend a concert. Venturing around San Francisco, the characters discuss race and gentrification with regard to the low percentage of blacks living in San Francisco. Micah is openly critical of Jo's interracial relationship as he struggles to reconcile his black identity with the predominantly white world of the hipster scene in San Francisco.

== Production ==
Jenkins wrote the film two years prior to its release. Medicine for Melancholy mainly confronts themes of African American assimilation into "hipster" or "indie" culture. The city of San Francisco also emphasizes African-Americans as the minority, because African-Americans are seven percent of San Francisco's population. Writer and director Barry Jenkins has described the film's two main characters as "playing out a debate back and forth about identity politics". Each of the two main characters embodies an ideology. Jenkins saw the character of Micah as a man who was always building barriers, whereas Jo thinks that race is a limiter. Accusing Jo of assimilation, Micah strives to reclaim his essential "blackness" as Jo contrastingly claims Micah has a "hang up" about his race and strives to overcome her own. The film includes the desaturation of images. Filmmakers went through the film shot by shot and pulled out the majority of color. In an interview, director Barry Jenkins stated that certain scenes in the film have more color to reflect when the characters are not thinking about race or housing issues.

== Release ==
The film had its world premiere at South by Southwest on March 7, 2008. It went on to screen at the Los Angeles Film Festival on June 20, 2008. Shortly after, IFC Films acquired distribution rights to the film. It also screened at the Toronto International Film Festival in September, and at the Mar del Plata International Film Festival in November where it was nominated for Best Film. It was released in a limited release on January 30, 2009.

== Critical reception ==
On the review aggregator website Rotten Tomatoes, 85% of 40 critics' reviews are positive. The website's consensus reads: "Blessed with clever dialogue and poignant observations of class and race, Medicine For Melancholy is a promising debut for director Barry Jenkins." On Metacritic, the film has a weighted average score of 62 out of 100 based on 14 critics, which the site labels as "generally favorable" reviews.

Roger Ebert of the Chicago Sun-Times gave the film three and a half out of four stars, calling the actors "effortlessly engaging" and the direction "assured"; he also noted the film was "beautifully photographed". It was a New York Times Critics' Pick and nominated for three 2008 Independent Spirit Awards.

== Accolades ==
Award	Category	Recipient(s) and nominee(s)	Result	Ref(s)
Independent Spirit Awards	Best First Feature	Medicine for Melancholy	Nominated	
Independent Spirit Awards	Best Cinematography	James Laxton	Nominated	
Independent Spirit Awards	Someone to Watch Award	Barry Jenkins	Nominated	
Mar del Plata International Film Festival	Best Film	Barry Jenkins	Nominated	
San Francisco Film Critics Circle	Marlon Riggs Award	Barry Jenkins	Won	
