= American Cinema Editors Awards 2017 =

67th ACE Eddie Awards
- Presented by: American Cinema Editors
- Date: January 27, 2017
- Site: The Beverly Hilton, Beverly Hills, California

Highlights
- Best Film: Drama: Arrival
- Best Film: Comedy: La La Land

The 67th American Cinema Editors Awards were presented on January 27, 2017 at the Beverly Hilton Hotel, honoring the best editors in films and television. The event was hosted by Rachel Bloom.

== Winners and nominees ==
Winners will be listed first, highlighted in boldface.

=== Film ===
Best Edited Feature Film – Dramatic:

Joe Walker – Arrival

- John Gilbert – Hacksaw Ridge
- Jake Roberts – Hell or High Water
- Jennifer Lame – Manchester by the Sea
- Nat Sanders and Joi McMillon – Moonlight

Best Edited Feature Film – Comedy or Musical:

Tom Cross – La La Land

- Julian Clarke – Deadpool
- Roderick Jaynes – Hail, Caesar!
- Mark Livolsi – The Jungle Book
- Yorgos Mavropsaridis – The Lobster

Best Edited Animated Feature Film:

Fabienne Rawley and Jeremy Milton – Zootopia

- Christopher Murrie – Kubo and the Two Strings
- Jeff Draheim – Moana

Best Edited Documentary Feature:

Bret Granato, Maya Mumma and Ben Sozanski – O.J.: Made in America

- Spencer Averick – 13th
- Matthew Hamachek – Amanda Knox
- Paul Crowder – The Beatles: Eight Days a Week – The Touring Years
- Eli B. Despres – Weiner

=== Television ===
Best Edited Half-Hour Series for Television:

Steven Rasch – Veep: "Morning After"

- Brian Merken – Silicon Valley: "The Uptick"
- Shawn Paper – Veep: "Mother"

Best Edited One Hour Series for Commercial Television:

David L. Bertman – This Is Us: "Pilot"

- Skip Macdonald – Better Call Saul: "Fifi"
- Skip Macdonald and Curtis Thurber – Better Call Saul: "Klick"
- Kelley Dixon and Chris McCaleb – Better Call Saul: "Nailed"
- Philip Harrison – Mr. Robot: "eps2.4_m4ster-s1ave.aes"

Best Edited One Hour Series for Non-Commercial Television:

Tim Porter – Game of Thrones: "Battle of the Bastards"

- Yan Miles – The Crown: "Assassins"
- Dean Zimmerman – Stranger Things: "Chapter One: The Vanishing of Will Byers"
- Kevin D. Ross – Stranger Things: "Chapter Seven: The Bathtub"
- Stephen Semel and Marc Jozefowicz – Westworld: "The Original"

Best Edited Mini-Series or Motion Picture for Television:

Carol Littleton – All the Way

- Jay Cassidy – The Night Of
- Adam Penn, Stewart Schill and C. Chi-yoon Chung – The People v. O. J. Simpson: American Crime Story: '"Marcia, Marcia, Marcia"

Best Edited Documentary for Television:

Bob Eisenhart – Everything is Copy (Nora Ephron: Scripted & Unscripted)

- Steve Audette – The Choice 2016
- Oliver Lief – We Will Rise: Michelle Obama’s Mission to Educate Girls Around the World

Best Edited Non-Scripted Series:

Mustafa Bhagat – Anthony Bourdain: Parts Unknown: "Senegal"'

- Hunter Gross – Anthony Bourdain: Parts Unknown: "Manila"
- Josh Earl and Alexander Rubinow – Deadliest Catch: "Fire at Sea: Part 2"

== Special awards ==
=== The Heritage Award ===
- Lori Jane Colman
- Diana Friedberg
- William Gordean

=== Career Achievement Award ===
- Janet Ashikaga
- Thelma Schoonmaker

=== Filmmaker of the Year Award ===
- J. J. Abrams
