= Joi McMillon =

American film editor

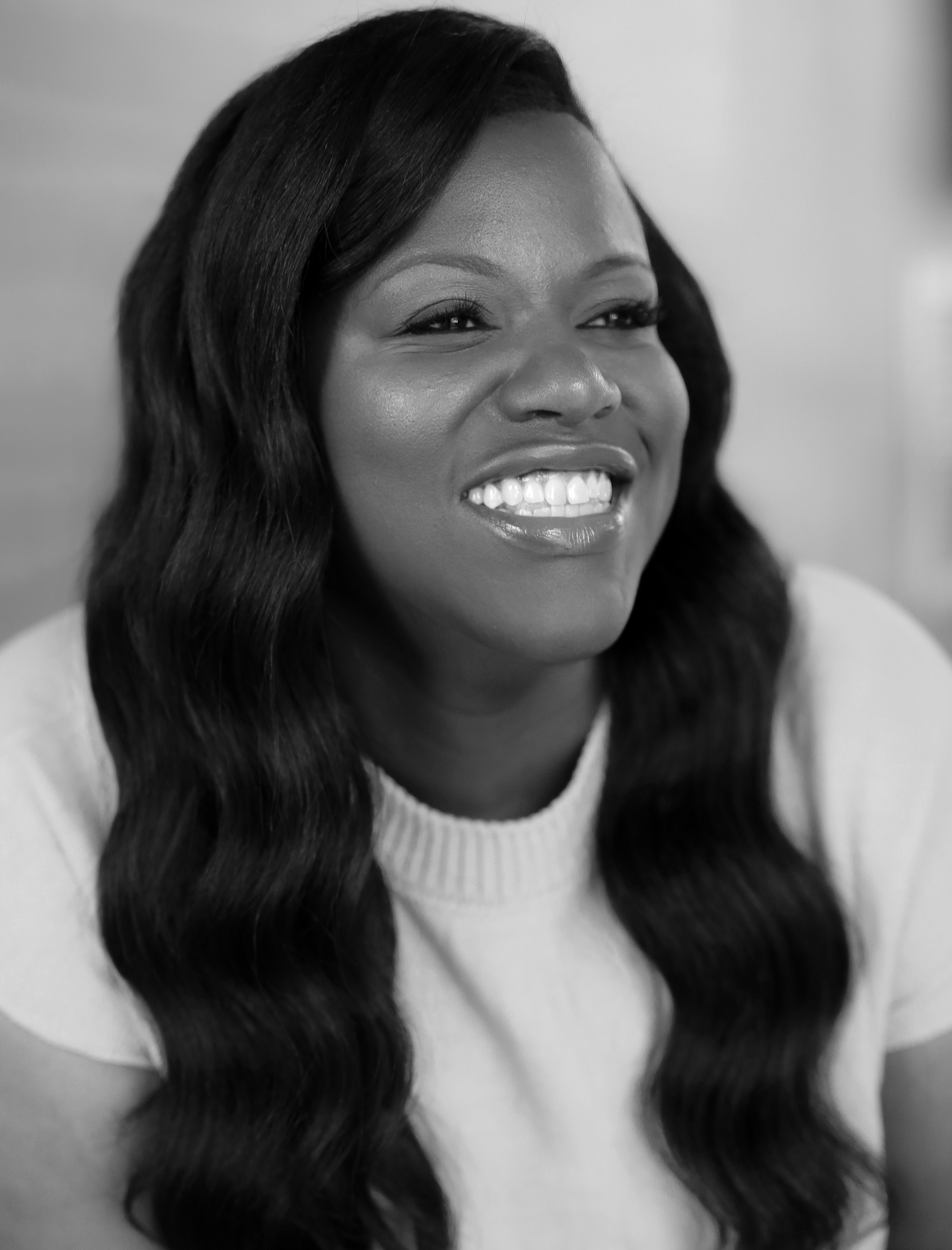
- McMillon in 2021
- Education: Florida State University College of Motion Picture Arts
- Occupations: Film and television editor

Joi McMillon is an American film editor. In 2003, she graduated from Florida State University College of Motion Picture Arts. McMillon is known for her work on the Academy Award-winning film Moonlight (2016), and If Beale Street Could Talk (2018), both winning several respective accolades.

== Career ==
McMillon initially planned to be a journalist, but a high school field trip to Universal Studios introduced her to the craft of editing and inspired her to apply to film school. She attended Florida State University College of Motion Picture Arts, graduating in 2003.

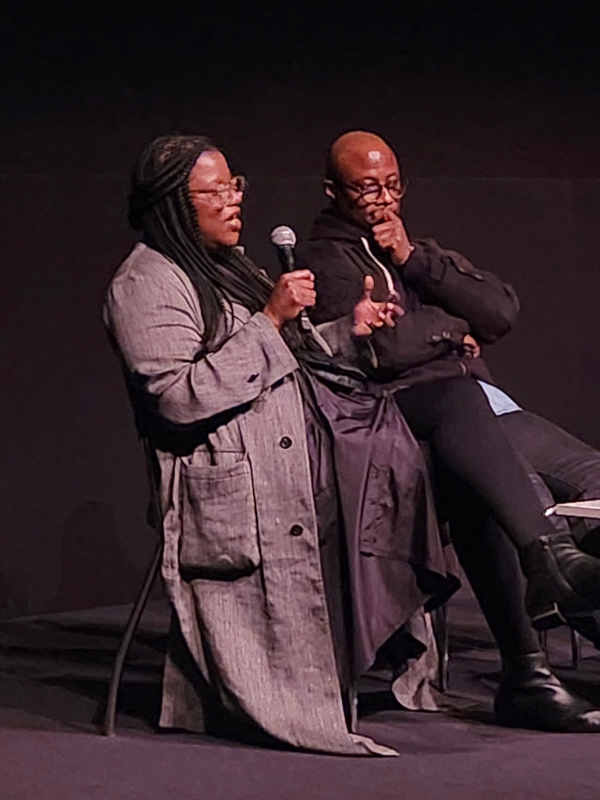
McMillon and director Barry Jenkins, with whom she worked on Moonlight, If Beale Street Could Talk, and The Underground Railroad

In 2017, she was nominated for an Academy Award for Best Film Editing (shared with Nat Sanders) at the 89th Academy Awards. McMillon is the first black woman to be nominated for an Oscar for film editing. Barry Jenkins said of her nomination in 2017: "I respect her work. It makes me very proud of the work she did to see that I'm not the only one. Clearly all these folks in the academy respected the work she did as well." McMillon also won (with Nat Sanders) Best Film Editing for her work on Moonlight at the 2017 Spirit Awards.

Since then, she has edited numerous films and a television series. In 2018, she collaborated with Nat Sanders again on the editing of If Beale Street Could Talk. In 2020, McMillon cut together Zola with filmmaker Janicza Bravo. Zola went on to win 2022 Winner Independent Spirit Award for Best Editing. In 2021, Joi led the editorial department on The Underground Railroad, a limited series adapted from Colson Whitehead's Pulitzer Prize-winning novel for Amazon Studios.

== Filmography ==
=== Editor ===
- Blue Boy (Short, 2009)
- Shades of Gray (Short, 2009)
- Shoot the Moon (Short, 2009)
- Chlorophyl (Short, 2011)
- The Other Side of Silence (Documentary, 2012)
- The Radio Gamers (Short, 2013)
- Off-Season (Short, 2013)
- SMILF (Short, 2015)
- Anne & Jake (TV series) (7 episodes, 2015)
- Girls (TV series) (1 episode, 2016)
- Man Rots from the Head (Short, 2016)
- Moonlight (2016)
- Lemon (2017)
- Hum (Short) (2017)
- American Woman (2018)
- If Beale Street Could Talk (2018)
- Zola (2020)
- The Underground Railroad (TV series) (2021)
- Mufasa: The Lion King (2024)

=== Editorial department ===
- The Biggest Loser (TV series) (assistant editor - 5 episodes, 2004)
- The Surreal Life (TV series) (assistant editor - 12 episodes, 2004)
- Going Hollywood (TV series) (first assistant editor - 2005)
- Beauty and the Geek (TV series) (first assistant editor - 15 episodes, 2005–2006)
- The Sarah Silverman Program (TV series) (assistant editor - 5 episodes, 2007) (first assistant editor - 1 episode, 2007)
- Talk to Me (apprentice editor, 2007)
- Taking 5 (first assistant editor, 2007)
- Judy's Got a Gun (TV Movie) (assistant editor, 2007)
- Columbus Day (first assistant editor, 2008)
- American Violet (first assistant editor, 2008)
- Not Easily Broken (first assistant editor, 2009)
- I Can Do Bad All by Myself (first assistant editor, 2009)
- Why Did I Get Married Too? (first assistant editor, 2010)
- Arcadia Lost (first assistant editor, 2010)
- For Colored Girls (first assistant editor, 2010)
- Madea's Big Happy Family (first assistant editor, 2011)
- Good Deeds (first assistant editor, 2012)
- Madea's Witness Protection (assistant editor, 2012)
- Temptation: Confessions of a Marriage Counselor (first assistant editor, 2013)
- Wyatt Cenac: Brooklyn (TV Movie) (assistant editor, 2014)
- Togetherness (TV series) (assistant editor - 5 episodes, 2015)
- Another Evil (additional editor, 2016)
- Sausage Party (assistant editor: live action footage, 2016)
- Mr. Church (first assistant editor, 2016)

=== Other credits ===
- Little Brown Boy (2003) (Short)
- My Josephine (2003) (Short)
- Straw Hat (2004) (Producer, assistant director)
- Medicine for Melancholy (2008) (special thanks)
- Sausage Party (2016) (special thanks)

== Accolades ==
Year	Award	Category	Nominated work	Recipients	Result
2016	Academy Awards	Best Film Editing	Moonlight	Joi McMillon (shared with Nat Sanders)	Nominated
2016	Alliance of Women Film Journalists	Best Editing	Moonlight	Joi McMillon (shared with Nat Sanders)	Nominated
2016	American Cinema Editors Awards	Best Edited Feature Film - Dramatic	Moonlight	Joi McMillon (shared with Nat Sanders)	Nominated
2016	Critics' Choice Awards	Best Editing	Moonlight	Joi McMillon (shared with Nat Sanders)	Nominated
2016	Central Ohio Film Critics Association	Best Film Editing	Moonlight	Joi McMillon (shared with Nat Sanders)	2nd Placed
2016	Chicago Film Critics Association Awards	Best Editing	Moonlight	Joi McMillon (shared with Nat Sanders)	Nominated
2016	Independent Spirit Awards	Best Editing	Moonlight	Joi McMillon (shared with Nat Sanders)	Won
2016	Indiewire Critics' Poll	Best Film Editing	Moonlight	Joi McMillon (shared with Nat Sanders)	Won
2016	London Critics Circle Film Awards	Technical Achievement Award	Moonlight	Joi McMillon (shared with Nat Sanders)	Nominated
2016	Online Film Critics Society Awards	Best Editing	Moonlight	Joi McMillon (shared with Nat Sanders)	Nominated
2016	Phoenix Film Critics Society Awards	Best Film Editing	Moonlight	Joi McMillon (shared with Nat Sanders)	Nominated
2016	San Francisco Film Critics Circle	Best Film Editing	Moonlight	Joi McMillon (shared with Nat Sanders)	Nominated
2016	Satellite Awards	Best Editing	Moonlight	Joi McMillon (shared with Nat Sanders)	Nominated
2016	Seattle Film Critics Awards	Best Film Editing	Moonlight	Joi McMillon (shared with Nat Sanders)	Nominated
2016	St. Louis Film Critics Association	Best Editing	Moonlight	Joi McMillon (shared with Nat Sanders)	Nominated
2016	Washington DC Area Film Critics Association Awards	Best Editing	Moonlight	Joi McMillon (shared with Nat Sanders)	Nominated

== See also ==
- List of film director and editor collaborations
