= Barry Jenkins =

American filmmaker (born 1979)

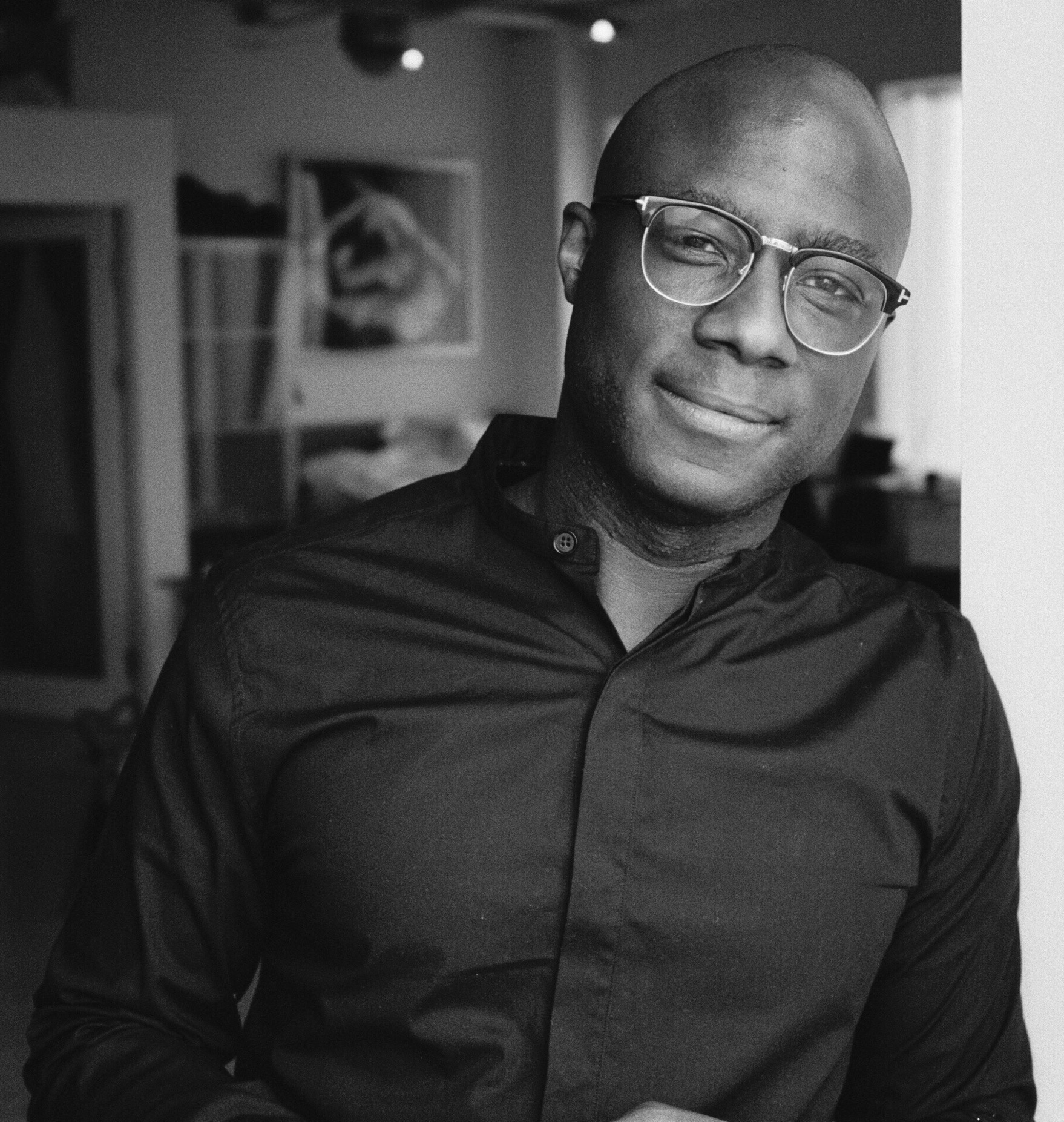
- Jenkins in 2017
- Born: November 19, 1979 (age 46); Miami, Florida, U.S.
- Education: Florida State University
- Occupations: Film director; screenwriter; producer
- Years active: 2003–present
- Spouse: Lulu Wang (m. 2024)
- Children: 1

Barry Jenkins (born November 19, 1979) is an American filmmaker. After making his filmmaking debut with the short film My Josephine (2003), he directed his first feature film, Medicine for Melancholy (2008), for which he received an Independent Spirit Award nomination for Best First Feature. He is also a member of the Chopstars collective as a creative collaborator.

Following an eight-year hiatus from feature filmmaking, Jenkins directed and co-wrote the LGBTQ-themed independent drama Moonlight (2016), which won numerous accolades, including the Academy Award for Best Picture. Jenkins received an Oscar nomination for Best Director and jointly won the Academy Award for Best Adapted Screenplay with Tarell Alvin McCraney. He became the fourth Black person to be nominated for Best Director and the second Black person to direct a Best Picture winner. He released his third directorial feature, If Beale Street Could Talk, in 2018 to critical praise and screenplay-award nominations at the Academy Awards and Golden Globes.

He is also known for his work in television. Jenkins directed "Chapter V" of the Netflix series Dear White People in 2017. In 2021, he created and directed the Amazon Video limited series The Underground Railroad, based on the novel of the same name, for which he received a Primetime Emmy Award for Outstanding Directing for a Limited Series or Movie nomination and a Peabody Award. In 2017, Jenkins was included on the annual Time 100 list of the most influential people in the world.

== Early life ==
Jenkins was born on November 19, 1979, at Jackson Memorial Hospital in Miami, Florida, the youngest of four half-siblings, each from a different father. His father separated from his mother while she was pregnant with Jenkins, believing that he was not Jenkins's father; he died when Jenkins was 12. Jenkins, in later life, still has "no idea who my 'real' father is". "I don't think any of us were planned, but I was definitely a mistake", he said later.

His mother, a nurse, was addicted to crack cocaine, and was a teenage runaway who Jenkins has said abandoned him. (Note: His mother would later overcome her addiction.) Jenkins grew up in Liberty City, a neighborhood of Miami, and was primarily raised by another older woman (who had also looked after his mother while she was a teenager) in an overcrowded apartment: "I wasn't raised by anyone who was a blood relative of mine, and yet I could see my blood relatives all around the neighborhood because things were just so, so bad". As a teenager Jenkins lived with friends from Miami Northwestern Senior High School, where he played football and ran track. His disordered and lonely childhood led him to retreat inwards and develop an active imagination. He hoped to pursue a creative-writing degree.

Jenkins studied film at the Florida State University College of Motion Picture Arts (FSU), where he met many of his future frequent collaborators, including cinematographer James Laxton, producer Adele Romanski and editors Nat Sanders and Joi McMillon. His decision to study there was instigated by an initial visit: "I thought: This is the blackest place in America. I gotta be here". Feeling inadequate in terms of his technological skills, Jenkins took a year off to develop them. Jenkins felt a general lack of confidence at the start of the program, which began for Jenkins in a spontaneous manner. To resolve his personal misgivings, in a divergence from the inspirations of his classmates, he looked toward foreign arthouse cinema and directors like Wong Kar-wai, Claire Denis, Hou Hsiao-hsien, and Lynne Ramsay.

While at Florida State, Jenkins became a member of Alpha Phi Alpha fraternity. Four days after graduating from FSU, he moved to Los Angeles to pursue a filmmaking career, spending two years working on various projects as a production assistant. He became disillusioned with "Hollywood film-making" after working for Harpo Productions, an experience which contrasted with his time studying film, reflecting that "At school, film-making had been the most beautiful thing that ever happened to me".

== Career ==
=== 2000s–2010s: Early work ===
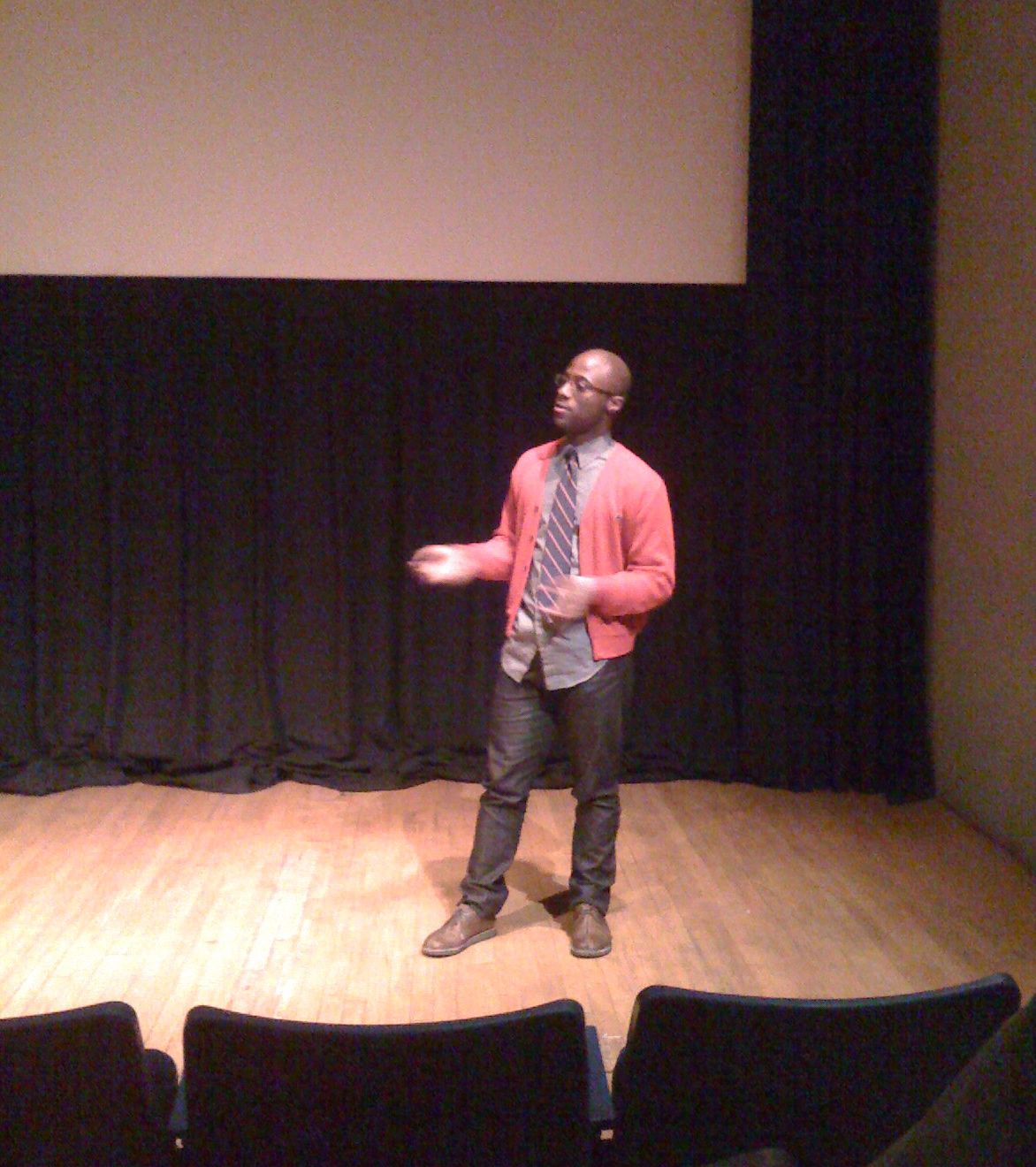
Jenkins at a Q&A for Medicine for Melancholy at the Northwest Film Forum in 2009

Jenkins' first film was his 2001 short My Josephine, which follows the romantic life of a young Arabic-speaking man, following the September 11 attacks. Previously he had fretted over his chances of success due to his racial and class identity, but My Josephine demonstrated that "I could do the work to make myself as accomplished as anyone else". He then explored Black children being tried as adults for the deaths of their peers in Little Brown Boy.

He would later follow it up with Medicine for Melancholy. The film, which has been linked to the mumblecore scene, stars Wyatt Cenac and Tracey Heggins. The impetus being the lack of low-budget mumblecore films which featured African-Americans, Jenkins recalled that the movie represented the "place where I was both physically, emotionally, and mentally". Well received by critics, the film underwent "the usual tour of festivals garnering its share of nominations, reviews, small awards and limited release distribution in major cities in 2009 and 2010". Before and during the production of Medicine for Melancholy, Jenkins worked as a shift supervisor at a Banana Republic store, which he later credited with making him a better filmmaker.

Following Medicine for Melancholy, Jenkins wrote multiple scripts: a time travel epic for Focus Features and adaptations of If Beale Street Could Talk and a memoir by Bill Clegg. He later worked as a carpenter and co-founded Strike Anywhere, an advertising company. In 2011, he wrote and directed Remigration, a sci-fi short film about gentrification. Jenkins became a writer for HBO's The Leftovers, about which he has said, "I didn't get to do much." In 2012, he received a United States Artists Fellowship grant. During this time period, he reckoned he matured as both a person and an artist. The lack of fruition with his scripts led him to consider if he was unable to produce another film; his next feature, he said, "just came to me".

=== 2016: Moonlight ===
Jenkins directed and co-wrote, with Tarell Alvin McCraney, the 2016 drama Moonlight, his first feature film in eight years. It is an adaptation of McCraney's play In Moonlight Black Boys Look Blue. Both writers' lives influenced the story, both having spent their childhoods in close proximity in Miami, Florida, although without knowing each other. While Jenkins found the main character, Chiron, reflective of himself, he did hold "some reservations and doubts" about adapting McCraney's play on account of being heterosexual; however, their shared characteristics and McCraney's trust in Jenkins emboldened him. Jenkins' screenplay – which he composed in ten days – expands upon McCraney's story, having more resources and control at his disposal than he had before. The movie was shot in 25 days, in Miami; the filming described by Naomie Harris as "very low-budget, it was very intimate film-making, collaborative". It premiered at the Telluride Film Festival in September 2016 to a substantial amount of awards and critical acclaim. According to film scholar Rahul Hamid, it was among the "most celebrated films of 2016, boasting ... inclusion in all of the major top ten lists". "He became the breakout of the year", said Camonghne Felix.

The film won dozens of accolades, including the Golden Globe Award for Best Picture – Drama and the Academy Award for Best Picture at the 89th Academy Awards. Jenkins and McCraney also won Best Adapted Screenplay. Overall, the film received eight Oscar nominations, including Best Director. Described as historic, Justin Gomer, scholar of American Studies, said that is "the most racially significant film to ever win", with it affecting the overall "whiteness" of the Oscars. Anthropologist Elizabeth Davis stated that Moonlight and similar films' acclaim indicates an "increase in the social and institutional recognition and approval of blackness". In 2022, in a poll of 1,639 participating critics, programmers, curators, archivists and academics, Sight and Sound crowned Moonlight as the 60th greatest film of all time.

=== 2017–present: Further projects ===
In 2017, Jenkins directed the fifth episode of the Netflix original series Dear White People, having been chosen due to his work on Moonlight. In line with the show's other directors, Jenkins' work was guided by an overall visual framework, although he was encouraged to be distinctive. In 2013, the same year he wrote Moonlight, Jenkins had written a film adaptation of James Baldwin's novel If Beale Street Could Talk. Production began in October 2017 with Annapurna Pictures, Pastel, and Plan B. Jenkins worked closely with Baldwin's estate and was given handwritten notes about how he would have approached a film version – "a slow epiphany" is how Jenkins described reading the notes. The adaptation is largely faithful to the source material, although aspects, such as the opening and ending, are changed. The film was released in December 2018 to critical acclaim. It garnered numerous accolades, including Best Supporting Actress wins for Regina King at the Academy Awards and Golden Globes. Jenkins received an Academy Award nomination for Best Adapted Screenplay.

Aided by his previous television work, Jenkins directed the 2021 television series adaptation of Colson Whitehead's novel The Underground Railroad, the series being a passion project for Jenkins. It was initiated by Amazon Studios (and subsequently ordered to series in June 2018) after Jenkins' strong Oscar haul for Moonlight. The main cast of The Underground Railroad includes Thuso Mbedu as Cora, with Chase W. Dillon as Homer and Aaron Pierre as Caesar.

"[Bringing] together a group of disparate artists", Jenkins and the casting director, Francine Maisler, searched worldwide for an actor to play Cora and sought those then-undiscovered. The series' creation was deeply personal – with Jenkins once receiving an assessment by the on-set therapist. It proved to be the most difficult project of his career yet with him feeling a closer attachment to his ancestral past. The show was met with critical acclaim; it was the most recent entry to the BBC's 2021 list of the 21st century's greatest TV shows. In 2024, he wrote a screenplay based on the life of boxer Claressa Shields titled The Fire Inside and directed Mufasa: The Lion King, a prequel to the CGI remake of Disney's The Lion King that primarily concerns the coming of age origins of Mufasa.

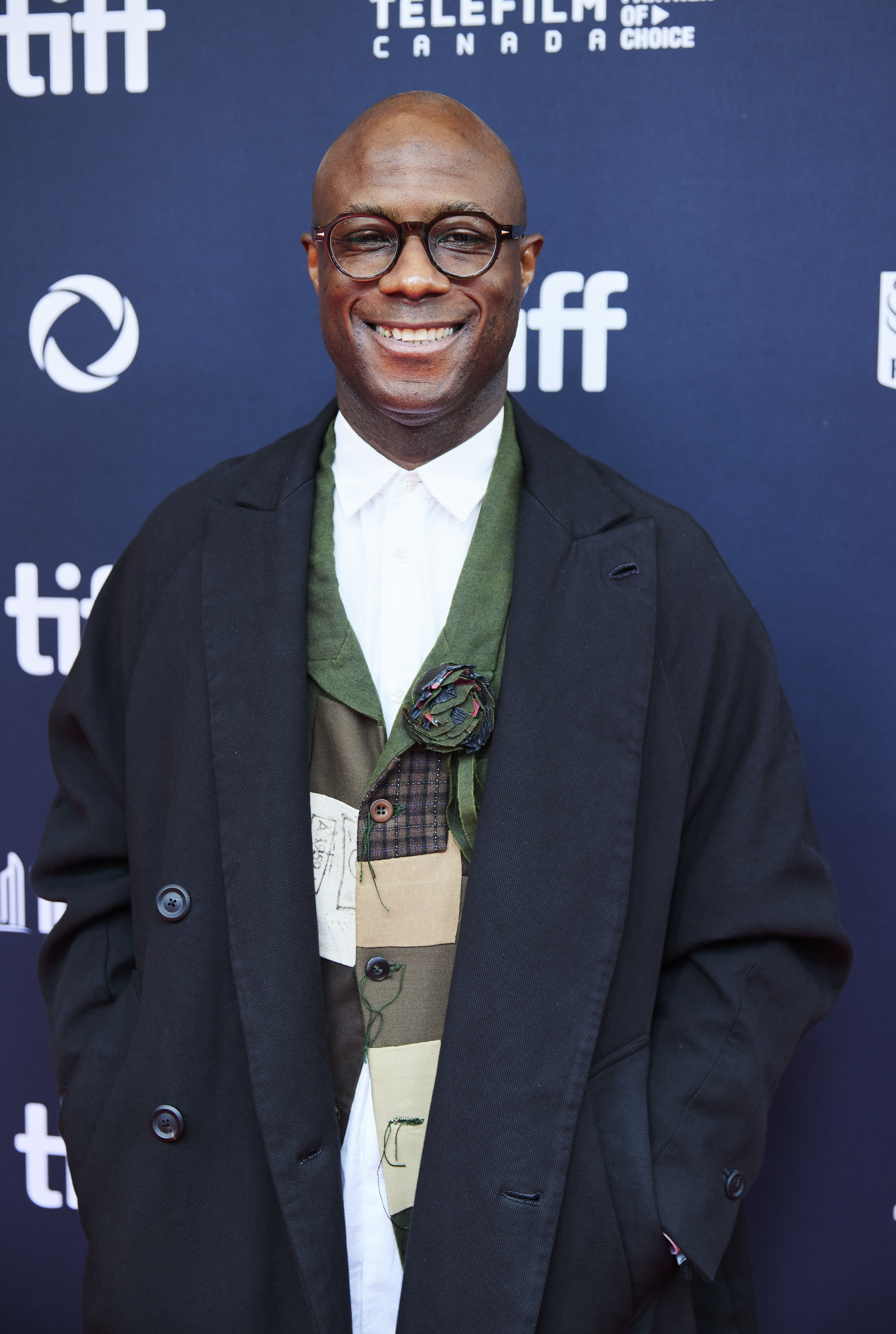
Jenkins at the 2024 Toronto International Film Festival

More recently, his Pastel production company signed a first look deal with HBO, HBO Max and A24. In 2023 he was slated to serve as head of the Platform Prize jury at the 2023 Toronto International Film Festival.

In 2025, he signed to direct Universal's sci-fi thriller The Natural Order, starring Glen Powell and based on an upcoming novel of the same name by Matthew Aldrich, who would co-write the screenplay alongside Jenkins. Jenkins also signed on to direct Zendaya in A24's biopic on the life of Ronettes singer Ronnie Spector, Be My Baby. The film, being written by Dave Kajganich, was to focus on a specific moment of Spector's life, namely her relationship with troubled producer Phil Spector.

=== Unrealized projects ===
Untitled time travel film

In an interview in 2016, Jenkins revealed that in the aftermath of Medicine for Melancholy he wrote and developed a manic-sounding epic about "Stevie Wonder and time travel," involving a mysterious mansion in Harlem and a vintage Moog synthesizer with magical, spacetime-altering properties. Jenkins was working on the film with Focus Features, but it never panned out.

Portrait of an Addict as a Young Man film

Also in the aftermath of Medicine for Melancholy, Jenkins penned a screenplay adaptation, on assignment, of Bill Clegg's 2010 memoir, Portrait of an Addict as a Young Man.

The Intuitionist film

Years prior to his work on The Underground Railroad, Jenkins had tried to adapt The Intuitionist, the first novel by the same author, Colson Whitehead.

Expatriate film

In January 2018, Jenkins was attached to direct Chadwick Boseman in the thriller film Expatriate, set around a 1970s plane hijacking. Boseman wrote the script with his writing partner Logan Coles. The film remains unrealized as of Boseman's death.

Alvin Ailey biopic

In June 2019, Deadline announced that Jenkins was attached to direct Fox Searchlight's biopic about Alvin Ailey, one of the most influential choreographers of the 20th century. As of 2024 the film was still in development, and was considered by producer Adele Romanski as a possible follow up to Mufasa.

Virunga film

Deadline also reported that Jenkins would team up with Leonardo DiCaprio and Netflix, to write the feature adaptation on the documentary Virunga. The true story follows rangers risking their lives to save Africa's most precious national park and its endangered gorillas.

The Knick season 3

In September 2020, Steven Soderbergh confirmed that a new season of The Knick was in development led by Jenkins.

== Artistry ==
Jenkins has a close working relationship with cinematographer James Laxton, stating that "the way we are on set is a shared language, a shared approach to the imagery". On set, Jenkins said that their goal is to incorporate as much of their preceding deliberations as possible whilst still considerate of the actors' needs and available time. He has stated his approach as precise and intimate: "always on set thinking about what else I can do"; his style has been noted to have specific focus upon the emotive states of the characters. Aaron Pierre described Jenkins as "the epitome of a leader ... because he ensured that everyone was feeling safe, everyone was feeling supported". Jenkins has cited James Baldwin as a significant influence, reflecting that in his early career he was "obsessed" with him. Claire Denis' Friday Night was the inspiration behind Medicine for Melancholy. He credits his romantic partner and fellow filmmaker Lulu Wang with inspiring him, "add[ing] rigor to creative practice". Morgan Jerkins opined that Jenkins, who re-reads texts he is adapting, "is not only a filmmaker but also a bibliophile who pulls from both historical and contemporary sources".

Despite a more intense plot and themes, discussing parenting, friendship, and black masculinity, especially in regards to sexual orientation, Jenkins made the decision to invert Medicine for Melancholy's sombre color palette in Moonlight; he wished for the audience to be immersed and for there to be a "softness around the characters" – a desire also reflected in his choice of aspect ratio, 2:35. Each of the film's three distinct chapters feature specific visuals, with the general visuals underscoring the themes of the film and intended to "elevate" the story. Visuals are a key aspect of his storytelling, with focus upon how he can "visually translate [a] story". Various elements of Moonlight represent time, a particular interest of Jenkins; he "transforms time's passing into a series of rites of passage" and uses chopped and screwed's manipulation of time throughout the film.

Moonlight, If Beale Street Could Talk and The Underground Railroad compose, in the eyes of Jenkins, a thematic trilogy, exploring childhood abandonment – including his own feelings. Moonlight depicts his childhood experience as he lived it whereas If Beale Street Could Talk showcased his, at times, desired family; Whitehead's novel helped him process his feelings of abandonment and he recognized separation of family as a prominent aspect of the story. Jenkins has expressed an inclination to empathize with the characters in his work. Adele Romanski identified Medicine for Melancholy, Moonlight, If Beale Street Could Talk as variations upon a template: a love story. Jenkins noted that Moonlight and If Beale Street Could Talk are most similar in their visuals.

=== Black identity ===
In both Medicine for Melancholy and Moonlight, Jenkins couples introspection with speculation upon Black identity; Moonlight and If Beale Street Could Talk are "tough but tender meditations on African American lives". Gomer aligned Jenkins with "the history of black independent filmmakers and artists who interrogate the category of blackness itself". Jenkins has stated that, amidst his solemn consideration of the craft and formalism of film, he seeks to articulate his "personal experience, what it feels like to be a young black man in America" – his perception evident in My Josephine, and surmised to be in Moonlight, saying of the former "it fucking worked. I thought, 'This is what I am going to do for the rest of my life.'" (Note: Jenkins has said "what was so difficult about everything that happened with Moonlight [is that] I'm not smart enough to say as much as I have to say about the film without revealing things about myself. But that's the last thing I ever want to do".)

With Moonlight, Jenkins intertwined "well-known images and stories of contemporary Black life" with queer identity and made the intersectional nature "more legible, not to white audiences but to black communities". Whiteness is diminished in Moonlight, which has been said to defy traditional Hollywood understandings of black masculinity and general black identity, showcasing a spectrum of black sexuality and masculinity. (Note: When asked if he viewed the main character, Chiron, "as an antidote to stereotypes about black masculinity", Jenkins replied: "I did not sit down to draw him in that way, not as a response to anything ... Watching a black man cradle a boy [Chiron] in the Atlantic Ocean ... That's a very simple image. It's not something you draw to counter a stereotype".) The Underground Railroad similarly breaks away, Jenkins choosing to avoid a portrayal of slaves as solely virtuous – Jenkins having "distinguish[ed]" himself from what Gomer dubs "New Black Hollywood". "I hope it can recontextualise rather than reinforce stereotypes about my ancestors, that have been allowed to persist over the decades", Jenkins said.

After The Underground Railroad's release Felix wrote that Jenkins "is breaking the fourth wall to help Black people look themselves in the eye". She viewed the changed ending of If Beale Street Could Talk as an attempt "to give his mostly Black viewership a happy ending, or at least a happier one". Jenkins has expressed consideration of his audience, considering such a perspective as a byproduct of film's expensive nature, although he does not desire to "make decisions that anticipate the reaction of an audience".

== Personal life ==
Jenkins began dating filmmaker Lulu Wang in 2018. They married at a private ceremony in December 2024, and had a child in 2025.

== Filmography ==
=== Film ===
Year	Title	Director	Writer	Producer	Ref.
2008	Medicine for Melancholy	Yes	Yes	No	
2016	Moonlight	Yes	Yes	No	
2018	If Beale Street Could Talk	Yes	Yes	Yes	
2020	Charm City Kings	No	Story	No	
2024	The Fire Inside	No	Yes	Yes	
2024	Mufasa: The Lion King	Yes	No	No	
TBA	Be My Baby	Yes	No	No	

Producer only

- Aftersun (2022)
- All Dirt Roads Taste of Salt (2023)
- Sorry, Baby (2025)
- Preparation for the Next Life (2025)

Executive producer

- Never Rarely Sometimes Always (2020)
- The Fence (2025)

=== Television ===
Year	Title	Creator	Director	Writer	Executive producer	Notes	Ref.
2017	Dear White People	No	Yes	No	No	Episode "Chapter V"	
2021	The Underground Railroad	Yes	Yes	Yes	Yes	10 episodes	
2024	True Detective	No	No	No	Yes		

As himself

- Light & Magic (2022) (2 episodes)
