= James Laxton =

American cinematographer

- Education: Florida State University (BFA)
- Occupation: Cinematographer
- Years active: 2003–present
- Relatives: Aggie Guerard Rodgers (mother)

James Laxton is an American cinematographer, best known for his collaboration with Barry Jenkins, with his work on Moonlight earning him a nomination for the Academy Award for Best Cinematography.

== Career ==
Laxton began at Florida State University, where he met Barry Jenkins. After graduating, Laxton entered the industry by assisting the camera department on features and shorts, including projects from directors such as David Nordstrom, David Parker, and Cole Schreiber.

In childhood, Laxton accompanied his mother, a noted costume designer, to film sets. He reported being inspired by the rhythm of chaos and calm on the movie set, which played a significant role in his decision to enter the industry.

Laxton's most critically acclaimed credit is the 2016 film Moonlight، directed by Jenkins. A relatively low budget of 1.5 million dollars forced Laxton to forgo equipment such as underwater camera gear and search for innovative cinematographic solutions.

If Beale Street Could Talk was also a Jenkins collaboration. The film features a tragic love story set in 1970s New York City, between Clementine "Tish" Rivers (played by KiKi Layne) and wood artist Alonzo "Fonny" Hunt (played by Stephan James). The two struggle against racism, sexual harassment and assault, and a false rape accusation.

In discussing the success of the movie, which has been described as "trading docu-realism for crafted visual poetry of the highest level," Laxton and Jenkins accredited their years-long process of conversation and collaboration.

== Awards and nominations ==
| Year | Title | Awards/Nominations |
|---|---|---|
| 2008 | Medicine for Melancholy | Nominated – Independent Spirit Award for Best Cinematography |
| 2016 | Moonlight | Independent Spirit Award for Best Cinematography; Los Angeles Film Critics Association Award for Best Cinematography; New York Film Critics Circle Award for Best Cinematography; San Francisco Film Critics Circle Award for Best Cinematography; Nominated – Academy Award for Best Cinematography; Nominated – ASC Award for Outstanding Cinematography; Nominated – Chicago Film Critics Association Award for Best Cinematography; Nominated – Critics' Choice Movie Award for Best Cinematography; Nominated – San Diego Film Critics Society Award for Best Cinematography; Nominated – St. Louis Gateway Film Critics Award for Best Cinematography; Nominated – Washington D.C. Area Film Critics Award for Best Cinematography |
| 2018 | If Beale Street Could Talk | Nominated – Washington D.C. Area Film Critics Award for Best Cinematography |
