= Nat Sanders =

American film editor (born 1980)

- Born: Nathaniel Sanders; New London, Connecticut, U.S.
- Education: Florida State University
- Occupation: Film editor

Nathaniel Sanders is an American film editor. He is best known for his collaborations with Destin Daniel Cretton and Barry Jenkins. He won Independent Spirit Awards for both Short Term 12 (2013) and Moonlight (2016), as well as being nominated for an Academy Award for the latter.

== Life and career ==
Sanders was born in New London, Connecticut. He studied film at the Florida State University College of Motion Picture Arts, graduating in 2002. After moving to Hollywood, his first job as an editor was on the reality television show The Biggest Loser—a job that he quit when another FSU alumnus, writer-director Barry Jenkins, made his 2008 film Medicine for Melancholy, which Sanders moved to San Francisco to edit. (In 2014, Sanders thanked Jenkins for "saving me from a career in reality television".) When Medicine for Melancholy premiered at the 2008 South by Southwest film festival, Sanders met director Lynn Shelton and soon after headed to Seattle to edit her film Humpday, which was released in 2009.

Following the release of Medicine for Melancholy and Humpday, Sanders was named one of Filmmaker Magazine's "25 New Faces in Independent Film" in 2009. He worked at the Sundance Institute's Directors' Lab while editing his next project, the 2010 film The Freebie. In 2010, he had a minor acting role in Tiny Furniture; he was friends with Lena Dunham, the film's writer, director and lead actress. Sanders also edited Mark and Jay Duplass's film The Do-Deca-Pentathlon, which was released in 2012, four years after it had originally been filmed.

Sanders met Destin Daniel Cretton at the 2011 Sundance Film Festival, and in 2012 Cretton hired Sanders to edit Short Term 12, a feature-length adaption of Cretton's 2009 short film of the same name. In March 2014, Sanders won the Independent Spirit Awards' inaugural Best Editing award for his work on Short Term 12. After Short Term 12, he edited Laggies, his fourth collaboration with Lynn Shelton, and the first season of Togetherness, an HBO series created by Mark and Jay Duplass.

In 2016, Sanders, alongside Joi McMillon, edited the Barry Jenkins drama Moonlight. Sanders was responsible for editing the first and second chapters, while McMillon was responsible for the third. The pair received much acclaim for their work, and were both nominated for the Academy Award for Best Film Editing at the 89th Academy Awards.

He lives in Los Angeles with his wife.

== Filmography ==
=== Films ===
- Medicine for Melancholy (2008)
- Humpday (2009)
- The Freebie (2010)
- On the Ice (2011)
- Your Sister's Sister (2011)
- The Do-Deca-Pentathlon (2012)
- Short Term 12 (2013)
- Laggies (2014)
- Moonlight (2016)
- The Glass Castle (2017)
- If Beale Street Could Talk (2018)
- Just Mercy (2019)
- Shang-Chi and the Legend of the Ten Rings (2021)
- Next Goal Wins (2023)
- Spider-Man: Brand New Day (2026)

=== Television ===
- Togetherness (2015)
