= List of accolades received by If Beale Street Could Talk (film) =

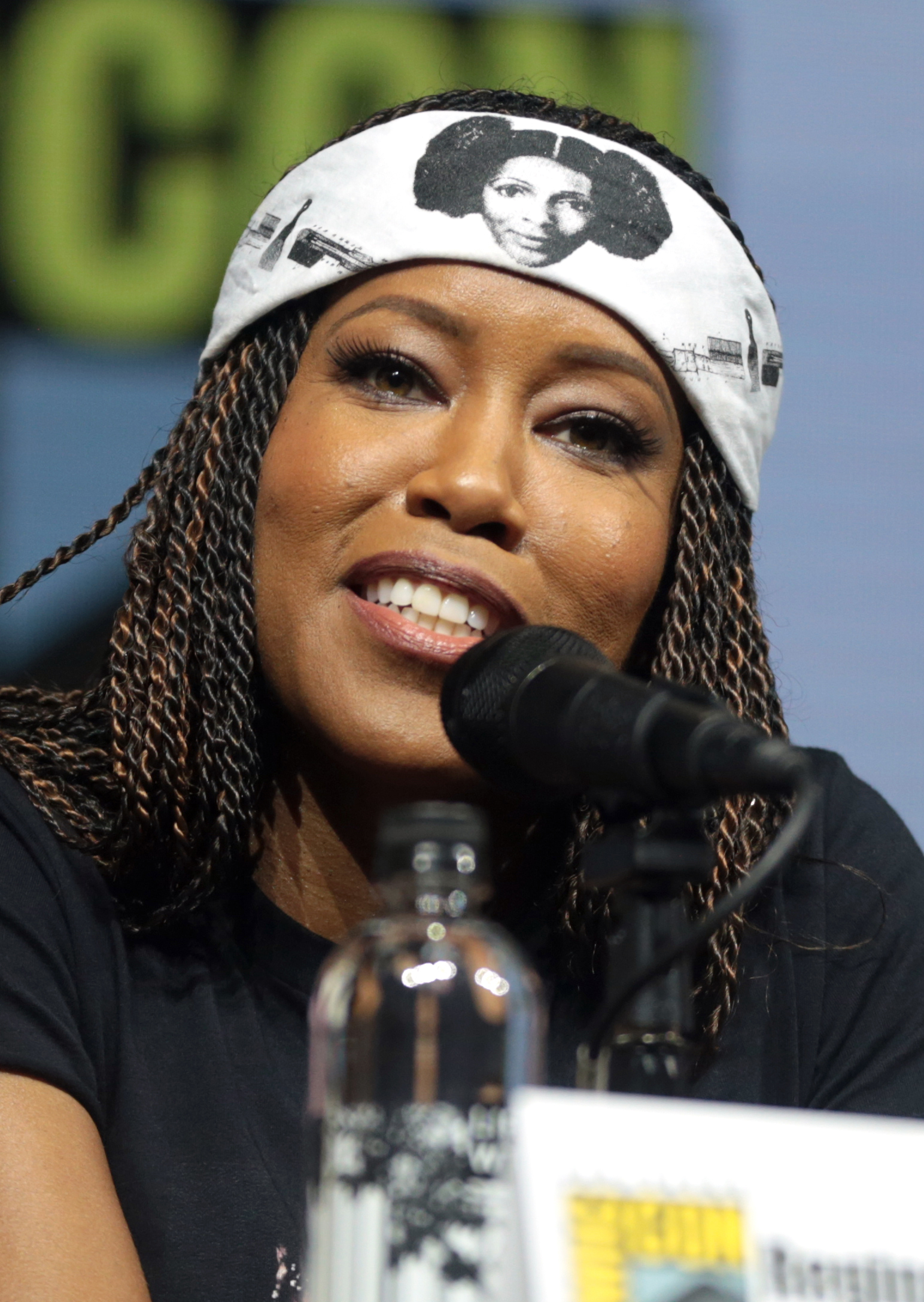
- Regina King received several awards and nominations for her supporting role in the film.
Accolades
Award	Wins	Nominations
AARP Movies for Grownups Awards	1	1
Academy Awards	1	3
African-American Film Critics Association	2	2
Alliance of Women Film Journalists	1	5
American Film Institute Awards	1	1
Artios Awards	0	1
Austin Film Critics Association	5	10
BET Awards	1	2
Black Reel Awards	4	14
Boston Society of Film Critics	4	4
British Academy Film Awards	0	2
Chicago Film Critics Association	2	4
Cinema for Peace	0	1
Critics' Choice Movie Awards	2	5
Dallas–Fort Worth Film Critics Association	2	2
Detroit Film Critics Society	1	1
Dorian Awards	1	5
Dublin Film Critics' Circle	2	2
Florida Film Critics Circle	2	8
Georgia Film Critics Association	0	9
Golden Globe Awards	1	3
Golden Trailer Awards	1	2
Gotham Awards	0	3
Hollywood Music in Media Awards	0	1
Houston Film Critics Society	1	6
Independent Spirit Awards	3	3
IndieWire Critics Poll	3	3
International Cinephile Society	3	5
London Film Critics' Circle	0	3
Los Angeles Film Critics Association	3	3
Mar del Plata International Film Festival	1	2
NAACP Image Awards	1	9
National Board of Review	3	3
National Society of Film Critics	3	3
New York Film Critics Circle	1	1
New York Film Critics Online	3	3
Online Film Critics Society	3	6
Palm Springs International Film Festival	1	1
San Francisco Film Critics Circle	1	7
Satellite Awards	2	7
Seattle Film Critics Society	1	7
St. Louis Film Critics Association	2	5
Toronto International Film Festival	1	1
USC Scripter Awards	0	1
Washington D.C. Area Film Critics Association	2	7
World Soundtrack Awards	1	1
Writers Guild of America Awards	0	1

Totals (Note: Certain award groups do not simply award one winner. They acknowledge several different recipients, have runners-up, and have third place. Since this is a specific recognition and is different from losing an award, runner-up mentions are considered wins in this award tally. For simplification and to avoid errors, each award in this list has been presumed to have had a prior nomination.)
- Wins: 73
- Nominations: 179

If Beale Street Could Talk is a 2018 American romantic drama film written and directed by Barry Jenkins. Based on James Baldwin's novel of the same name, it follows a young African-American woman who, with her family's support, seeks to clear the name of her wrongly-charged husband and prove his innocence before the birth of their child. The film's cast includes KiKi Layne, Stephan James, Colman Domingo, Teyonah Parris, Michael Beach, Dave Franco, Diego Luna, Pedro Pascal, Ed Skrein, Brian Tyree Henry and Regina King. Nicholas Britell composed the film's musical score, and James Laxton was the cinematographer. The film made its world premiere at the Toronto International Film Festival on September 9, 2018. Annapurna Pictures gave the film a limited release on December 14 before giving it a wide release on December 25. The film grossed $20.6 million on a $12 million budget. Rotten Tomatoes, a review aggregator, surveyed 363 reviews and judged 95% to be positive.

If Beale Street Could Talk gained awards and nominations in a variety of categories with particular praise for Jenkin's direction, King's performance as Sharon Rivers, Britell's score, and Laxton's cinematography. King won Best Supporting Actress at the 91st Academy Awards where the film also received nominations for Best Adapted Screenplay and Best Original Score. At the 34th Independent Spirit Awards, the film won all three of its nominations for Best Feature, Best Director, Best Supporting Female (King). King also received Best Supporting Actress awards at the 76th Golden Globe Awards and the 24th Critics' Choice Awards. Both the National Board of Review and American Film Institute included it in their top 10 films of 2018.

== Accolades ==
Table featuring accolades received by If Beale Street Could Talk
Award	Date of ceremony	Category	Recipient(s)	Result	Ref(s)
AARP's Movies for Grownups Awards	February 4, 2019	Best Time Capsule	If Beale Street Could Talk	Won	
Academy Awards	February 24, 2019	Best Supporting Actress	Regina King	Won	
Academy Awards	February 24, 2019	Best Adapted Screenplay	Barry Jenkins	Nominated	
Academy Awards	February 24, 2019	Best Original Score	Nicholas Britell	Nominated	
African American Film Critics Association	December 11, 2018	Best Supporting Actress	Regina King	Won	
African American Film Critics Association	December 11, 2018	Best Independent Film	If Beale Street Could Talk	Won	
Alliance of Women Film Journalists	January 10, 2019	Best Screenplay, Adapted	Barry Jenkins	Nominated	
Alliance of Women Film Journalists	January 10, 2019	Best Breakthrough Performance	KiKi Layne	Nominated	
Alliance of Women Film Journalists	January 10, 2019	Best Actress in a Supporting Role	Regina King	Won	
Alliance of Women Film Journalists	January 10, 2019	Best Ensemble Cast – Casting Director	Cindy Tolan	Nominated	
Alliance of Women Film Journalists	January 10, 2019	Best Cinematography	James Laxton	Nominated	
American Film Institute	January 4, 2019	Top 10 Films of the Year	If Beale Street Could Talk	Won	
Artios Awards	January 31, 2019	Feature Studio or Independent – Drama	Cindy Tolan and Anne Davidson	Nominated	
Austin Film Critics Association	January 7, 2019	Best Film	If Beale Street Could Talk	Won	
Austin Film Critics Association	January 7, 2019	Best Director	Barry Jenkins	Won	
Austin Film Critics Association	January 7, 2019	Best Supporting Actor	Brian Tyree Henry	Nominated	
Austin Film Critics Association	January 7, 2019	Best Supporting Actress	Regina King	Won	
Austin Film Critics Association	January 7, 2019	Best Adapted Screenplay	Barry Jenkins	Won	
Austin Film Critics Association	January 7, 2019	Best Cinematography	James Laxton	Nominated	
Austin Film Critics Association	January 7, 2019	Best Original Score	Nicholas Britell	Nominated	
Austin Film Critics Association	January 7, 2019	Best Editing	Joi McMillon and Nat Sanders	Nominated	
Austin Film Critics Association	January 7, 2019	Breakthrough Artist Award	Brian Tyree Henry	Won	
BET Awards	June 23, 2019	Best Movie	If Beale Street Could Talk	Nominated	
BET Awards	June 23, 2019	Best Actress	Regina King	Won	
Black Reel Awards	February 7, 2019	Outstanding Motion Picture	If Beale Street Could Talk	Nominated	
Black Reel Awards	February 7, 2019	Outstanding Director	Barry Jenkins	Nominated	
Black Reel Awards	February 7, 2019	Outstanding Actor	Stephan James	Nominated	
Black Reel Awards	February 7, 2019	Outstanding Actress	KiKi Layne	Won	
Black Reel Awards	February 7, 2019	Outstanding Supporting Actor	Brian Tyree Henry	Nominated	
Black Reel Awards	February 7, 2019	Outstanding Supporting Actress	Regina King	Won	
Black Reel Awards	February 7, 2019	Outstanding Screenplay	Barry Jenkins	Nominated	
Black Reel Awards	February 7, 2019	Outstanding Ensemble	The cast of If Beale Street Could Talk	Nominated	
Black Reel Awards	February 7, 2019	Outstanding Breakthrough, Male	Brian Tyree Henry	Nominated	
Black Reel Awards	February 7, 2019	Outstanding Breakthrough, Female	KiKi Layne	Nominated	
Black Reel Awards	February 7, 2019	Outstanding Cinematography	James Laxton	Won	
Black Reel Awards	February 7, 2019	Outstanding Score	Nicholas Britell	Won	
Black Reel Awards	February 7, 2019	Outstanding Costume Design	Caroline Eselin	Nominated	
Black Reel Awards	February 7, 2019	Outstanding Production Design	Mark Friedberg	Nominated	
Boston Society of Film Critics	December 16, 2018	Best Film	If Beale Street Could Talk	Won	
Boston Society of Film Critics	December 16, 2018	Best Supporting Actress	Regina King	Won	
Boston Society of Film Critics	December 16, 2018	Best Supporting Actor	Brian Tyree Henry	Runner-up (Note: Tied with Steven Yeun for Burning)	
Boston Society of Film Critics	December 16, 2018	Best Score	Nicholas Britell	Won	
British Academy Film Awards	February 10, 2019	Best Adapted Screenplay	Barry Jenkins	Nominated	
British Academy Film Awards	February 10, 2019	Best Original Music	Nicholas Britell	Nominated	
Chicago Film Critics Association	December 8, 2018	Best Supporting Actress	Regina King	Nominated	
Chicago Film Critics Association	December 8, 2018	Best Adapted Screenplay	Barry Jenkins	Won	
Chicago Film Critics Association	December 8, 2018	Best Cinematography	James Laxton	Nominated	
Chicago Film Critics Association	December 8, 2018	Best Original Score	Nicholas Britell	Won	
Cinema for Peace	February 10, 2019	Cinema for Peace Award for the Most Valuable Film of the Year	If Beale Street Could Talk	Nominated	
Critics' Choice Movie Awards	January 13, 2019	Best Picture	If Beale Street Could Talk	Nominated	
Critics' Choice Movie Awards	January 13, 2019	Best Supporting Actress	Regina King	Won	
Critics' Choice Movie Awards	January 13, 2019	Best Adapted Screenplay	Barry Jenkins	Won	
Critics' Choice Movie Awards	January 13, 2019	Best Original Score	Nicholas Britell	Nominated	
Critics' Choice Movie Awards	January 13, 2019	Best Cinematography	James Laxton	Nominated	
Dallas–Fort Worth Film Critics Association	December 17, 2018	Best Picture	If Beale Street Could Talk	8th Place	
Dallas–Fort Worth Film Critics Association	December 17, 2018	Best Supporting Actress	Regina King	Won	
Detroit Film Critics Society	December 3, 2018	Best Supporting Actress	Regina King	Won	
Dorian Awards	January 12, 2019	Film of the Year	If Beale Street Could Talk	Nominated	
Dorian Awards	January 12, 2019	Director of the Year	Barry Jenkins	Nominated	
Dorian Awards	January 12, 2019	Supporting Film Performance of the Year – Actress	Regina King	Won	
Dorian Awards	January 12, 2019	Screenplay of the Year	Barry Jenkins	Nominated	
Dorian Awards	January 12, 2019	Visually Striking Film of the Year	If Beale Street Could Talk	Nominated	
Dublin Film Critics' Circle	December 20, 2018	Best Actor	Stephan James	8th place (Note: Tied with Robert Pattinson for High Life)	
Dublin Film Critics' Circle	December 20, 2018	Best Cinematography	James Laxton	2nd place	
Florida Film Critics Circle	December 21, 2018	Best Film	If Beale Street Could Talk	Nominated	
Florida Film Critics Circle	December 21, 2018	Best Supporting Actress	Regina King	Nominated	
Florida Film Critics Circle	December 21, 2018	Best Screenplay	Barry Jenkins	Runner-up	
Florida Film Critics Circle	December 21, 2018	Best Ensemble	If Beale Street Could Talk	Nominated	
Florida Film Critics Circle	December 21, 2018	Best Cinematography	James Laxton	Nominated	
Florida Film Critics Circle	December 21, 2018	Best Art Direction / Production Design	If Beale Street Could Talk	Nominated	
Florida Film Critics Circle	December 21, 2018	Best Score	Nicholas Britell	Runner-up	
Florida Film Critics Circle	December 21, 2018	Pauline Kael Breakout Award	Kiki Layne	Nominated	
Georgia Film Critics Association	December 1, 2018	Best Picture	If Beale Street Could Talk	Nominated	
Georgia Film Critics Association	December 1, 2018	Best Director	Barry Jenkins	Nominated	
Georgia Film Critics Association	December 1, 2018	Best Adapted Screenplay	Barry Jenkins	Nominated	
Georgia Film Critics Association	December 1, 2018	Best Cinematography	James Laxton	Nominated	
Georgia Film Critics Association	December 1, 2018	Best Production Design	Mark Friedberg and Kris Moran	Nominated	
Georgia Film Critics Association	December 1, 2018	Best Original Score	Nicholas Britell	Nominated	
Georgia Film Critics Association	December 1, 2018	Best Supporting Actress	Regina King	Nominated	
Georgia Film Critics Association	December 1, 2018	Breakthrough Award	KiKi Layne	Nominated	
Georgia Film Critics Association	December 1, 2018	Best Ensemble	The cast of If Beale Street Could Talk	Nominated	
Golden Globe Awards	January 6, 2019	Best Motion Picture – Drama	If Beale Street Could Talk	Nominated	
Golden Globe Awards	January 6, 2019	Best Screenplay	Barry Jenkins	Nominated	
Golden Globe Awards	January 6, 2019	Best Supporting Actress – Motion Picture	Regina King	Won	
Golden Trailer Awards	May 29, 2019	Best Drama TV Spot	If Beale Street Could Talk	Nominated	
Golden Trailer Awards	May 29, 2019	Don LaFontaine Award for Best Voice Over	Annapurna Pictures and Motive Cinemas	Won	
Gotham Awards	November 26, 2018	Best Feature	If Beale Street Could Talk	Nominated	
Gotham Awards	November 26, 2018	Breakthrough Actor	KiKi Layne	Nominated	
Gotham Awards	November 26, 2018	Audience Award	If Beale Street Could Talk	Nominated	
Hollywood Music in Media Awards	November 14, 2018	Best Original Score – Feature Film	Nicholas Britell	Nominated	
Houston Film Critics Society	January 3, 2019	Best Picture	If Beale Street Could Talk	Nominated	
Houston Film Critics Society	January 3, 2019	Best Director	Barry Jenkins	Nominated	
Houston Film Critics Society	January 3, 2019	Best Supporting Actress	Regina King	Nominated	
Houston Film Critics Society	January 3, 2019	Best Adapted Screenplay	Barry Jenkins	Nominated	
Houston Film Critics Society	January 3, 2019	Best Original Score	Nicholas Britell	Won	
Houston Film Critics Society	January 3, 2019	Best Cinematography	James Laxton	Nominated	
Independent Spirit Awards	February 23, 2019	Best Feature	Dede Gardner, Barry Jenkins, Jeremy Kleiner, Sara Murphy and Adele Romanski	Won	
Independent Spirit Awards	February 23, 2019	Best Director	Barry Jenkins	Won	
Independent Spirit Awards	February 23, 2019	Best Supporting Female	Regina King	Won	
IndieWire Critics Poll	December 17, 2018	Best Film	If Beale Street Could Talk	10th place	
IndieWire Critics Poll	December 17, 2018	Best Supporting Actress	Regina King	2nd place	
IndieWire Critics Poll	December 17, 2018	Best Cinematography	James Laxton	3rd place	
International Cinephile Society	February 4, 2019	Best Picture	If Beale Street Could Talk	8th place	
International Cinephile Society	February 4, 2019	Best Supporting Actor	Brian Tyree Henry	Won	
International Cinephile Society	February 4, 2019	Best Supporting Actress	Regina King	Nominated	
International Cinephile Society	February 4, 2019	Best Adapted Scrrenplay	Barry Jenkins	Nominated	
International Cinephile Society	February 4, 2019	Best Original Score	Nicholas Britell	Won	
London Film Critics' Circle	January 20, 2019	Supporting Actress of the Year	Regina King	Nominated	
London Film Critics' Circle	January 20, 2019	Screenwriter of the Year	Barry Jenkins	Nominated	
London Film Critics' Circle	January 20, 2019	Technical Achievement Award	Nicholas Britell (Music)	Nominated	
Los Angeles Film Critics Association	December 9, 2018	Best Supporting Actress	Regina King	Won	
Los Angeles Film Critics Association	December 9, 2018	Best Use of Music/Score	Nicholas Britell	Won	
Los Angeles Film Critics Association	December 9, 2018	Best Cinematography	James Laxton	2nd place	
Mar del Plata International Film Festival	November 17, 2018	Golden Ástor	If Beale Street Could Talk	Nominated	
Mar del Plata International Film Festival	November 17, 2018	Audience Award	If Beale Street Could Talk	Won	
NAACP Image Awards	March 30, 2019	Outstanding Motion Picture	If Beale Street Could Talk	Nominated	
NAACP Image Awards	March 30, 2019	Outstanding Independent Motion Picture	If Beale Street Could Talk	Won	
NAACP Image Awards	March 30, 2019	Outstanding Directing in a Motion Picture	Barry Jenkins	Nominated	
NAACP Image Awards	March 30, 2019	Outstanding Actor in a Motion Picture	Stephan James	Nominated	
NAACP Image Awards	March 30, 2019	Outstanding Actress in a Motion Picture	KiKi Layne	Nominated	
NAACP Image Awards	March 30, 2019	Outstanding Supporting Actor in a Motion Picture	Brian Tyree Henry	Nominated	
NAACP Image Awards	March 30, 2019	Outstanding Supporting Actress in a Motion Picture	Regina King	Nominated	
NAACP Image Awards	March 30, 2019	Outstanding Writing in a Motion Picture	Barry Jenkins	Nominated	
NAACP Image Awards	March 30, 2019	Outstanding Breakthrough Performance in a Motion Picture	KiKi Layne	Nominated	
National Board of Review	November 27, 2018	Top 10 Films	If Beale Street Could Talk	Won	
National Board of Review	November 27, 2018	Best Supporting Actress	Regina King	Won	
National Board of Review	November 27, 2018	Best Adapted Screenplay	Barry Jenkins	Won	
National Society of Film Critics	January 5, 2019	Best Supporting Actress	Regina King	Won	
National Society of Film Critics	January 5, 2019	Best Supporting Actor	Brian Tyree Henry	3rd place	
National Society of Film Critics	January 5, 2019	Best Cinematography	James Laxton	2nd place	
New York Film Critics Circle	November 29, 2018	Best Supporting Actress	Regina King	Won	
New York Film Critics Online	December 9, 2018	Top 10 Films	If Beale Street Could Talk	Won	
New York Film Critics Online	December 9, 2018	Best Supporting Actress	Regina King	Won	
New York Film Critics Online	December 9, 2018	Best Use of Music	Nicholas Britell	Won	
Online Film Critics Society	January 2, 2019	Best Picture	If Beale Street Could Talk	Nominated	
Online Film Critics Society	January 2, 2019	Best Director	Barry Jenkins	Nominated	
Online Film Critics Society	January 2, 2019	Best Supporting Actress	Regina King	Won	
Online Film Critics Society	January 2, 2019	Best Adapted Screenplay	Barry Jenkins	Won	
Online Film Critics Society	January 2, 2019	Best Original Score	Nicholas Britell	Won	
Online Film Critics Society	January 2, 2019	Best Cinematography	James Laxton	Nominated	
Palm Springs International Film Festival	January 3, 2019	Chairman's Award	Regina King	Won	
San Francisco Film Critics Circle Awards	December 9, 2018	Best Picture	If Beale Street Could Talk	Nominated	
San Francisco Film Critics Circle Awards	December 9, 2018	Best Director	Barry Jenkins	Nominated	
San Francisco Film Critics Circle Awards	December 9, 2018	Best Supporting Actress	Regina King	Won	
San Francisco Film Critics Circle Awards	December 9, 2018	Best Adapted Screenplay	Barry Jenkins	Nominated	
San Francisco Film Critics Circle Awards	December 9, 2018	Best Original Score	Nicholas Britell	Nominated	
San Francisco Film Critics Circle Awards	December 9, 2018	Best Cinematography	James Laxton	Nominated	
San Francisco Film Critics Circle Awards	December 9, 2018	Best Production Design	Mark Friedberg	Nominated	
Satellite Awards	February 17, 2019	Best Motion Picture – Drama	If Beale Street Could Talk	Won	
Satellite Awards	February 17, 2019	Best Director	Barry Jenkins	Nominated	
Satellite Awards	February 17, 2019	Best Supporting Actress – Motion Picture	Regina King	Won	
Satellite Awards	February 17, 2019	Best Adapted Screenplay	Barry Jenkins	Nominated	
Satellite Awards	February 17, 2019	Best Film Editing	Joi McMillon and Nat Sanders	Nominated	
Satellite Awards	February 17, 2019	Best Cinematography	James Laxton	Nominated	
Satellite Awards	February 17, 2019	Best Original Score	Nicholas Britell	Nominated	
Seattle Film Critics Society	December 17, 2018	Best Picture of the Year	If Beale Street Could Talk	Nominated	
Seattle Film Critics Society	December 17, 2018	Best Director	Barry Jenkins	Nominated	
Seattle Film Critics Society	December 17, 2018	Best Actress in a Supporting Role	Regina King	Won	
Seattle Film Critics Society	December 17, 2018	Best Screenplay	Barry Jenkins	Nominated	
Seattle Film Critics Society	December 17, 2018	Best Cinematography	James Laxton	Nominated	
Seattle Film Critics Society	December 17, 2018	Best Original Score	Nicholas Britell	Nominated	
Seattle Film Critics Society	December 17, 2018	Best Ensemble Cast	The cast of If Beale Street Could Talk	Nominated	
St. Louis Film Critics Association	December 16, 2018	Best Supporting Actress	Regina King	Won	
St. Louis Film Critics Association	December 16, 2018	Best Adapted Screenplay	Barry Jenkins	Nominated	
St. Louis Film Critics Association	December 16, 2018	Best Score	Nicholas Britell	Nominated	
St. Louis Film Critics Association	December 16, 2018	Best Cinematography	James Laxton	2nd place	
St. Louis Film Critics Association	December 16, 2018	Best Production Design	Mark Friedberg	Nominated	
Toronto International Film Festival	September 16, 2018	People's Choice Award	If Beale Street Could Talk	2nd Place	
USC Scripter Awards	February 9, 2019	Best Adapted Screenplay	Barry Jenkins	Nominated	
Washington D.C. Area Film Critics Association	December 3, 2018	Best Film	If Beale Street Could Talk	Nominated	
Washington D.C. Area Film Critics Association	December 3, 2018	Best Director	Barry Jenkins	Nominated	
Washington D.C. Area Film Critics Association	December 3, 2018	Best Supporting Actress	Regina King	Won	
Washington D.C. Area Film Critics Association	December 3, 2018	Best Adapted Screenplay	Barry Jenkins	Nominated	
Washington D.C. Area Film Critics Association	December 3, 2018	Best Score	Nicholas Britell	Won	
Washington D.C. Area Film Critics Association	December 3, 2018	Best Cinematography	James Laxton	Nominated	
Washington D.C. Area Film Critics Association	December 3, 2018	Best Acting Ensemble	The cast of If Beale Street Could Talk	Nominated	
World Soundtrack Awards	October 18, 2019	Film Composer of the Year	Nicholas Britell	Won	
Writers Guild of America Awards	February 17, 2019	Best Adapted Screenplay	Barry Jenkins	Nominated	

== See also ==
- 2018 in film
