= Smithsonian African American Film Festival =

Film festival in Washington, D.C.

The Smithsonian African American Film Festival was a film festival in Washington, D.C. organized by the National Museum of African American History and Culture. It was curated and organized by Rhea L. Combs. Showing over 80 films from directors like Barry Jenkins and Steve McQueen, its inaugural event took place October 24–27, 2018.

== History ==
In 2018, from October 24–27, the inaugural event took place on the grounds of the National Museum of African American History and Culture, as well as the Freer Sackler Gallery and the National Gallery of Art.

The film festival showed the works of "15 separate up-and-coming auteurs" as well as "roughly 65 films from years past—many archival." New films shown included Widows directed by McQueen, If Beale Street Could Talk directed by Jenkins, and Quincy directed by Rashida Jones, among others. Older films included Sankofa, a 1993 film directed by Haile Gerima, and Killer of Sheep, a 1978 film directed by Charles Burnett. Additionally, there was a Say Her Name Program consisting of four women-centered films.

On October 25, the official Black Panther costume was exhibited during the festival's Night of the Museum celebration; the costume, as well as numerous other objects from the film, had been acquired by the National Museum of African American History and Culture's Earl W. and Amanda Stafford Center for African American Media Arts earlier in 2018.

The film festival also included filmmaking workshops and networking opportunities for college students.

== Awards ==
In the 2018 film festival, six categories were awarded:

- Narrative Feature: Alaska is a Drag, dir. Shaz Bennett
- Narrative Short: Where the Water Runs, dir. DuBois Ashong
- Documentary Feature: United Skates, dir. Tina Brown and Dyana Winkler
- Documentary Short: Black 14, dir. Darius Clark Monroe
- Experimental and Animation: Give, dir. David de Rozas
- Audience Award: Respect and Love, dir. Angelique Webster
