= List of awards and nominations received by Barry Jenkins =

Barry Jenkins awards and nominations
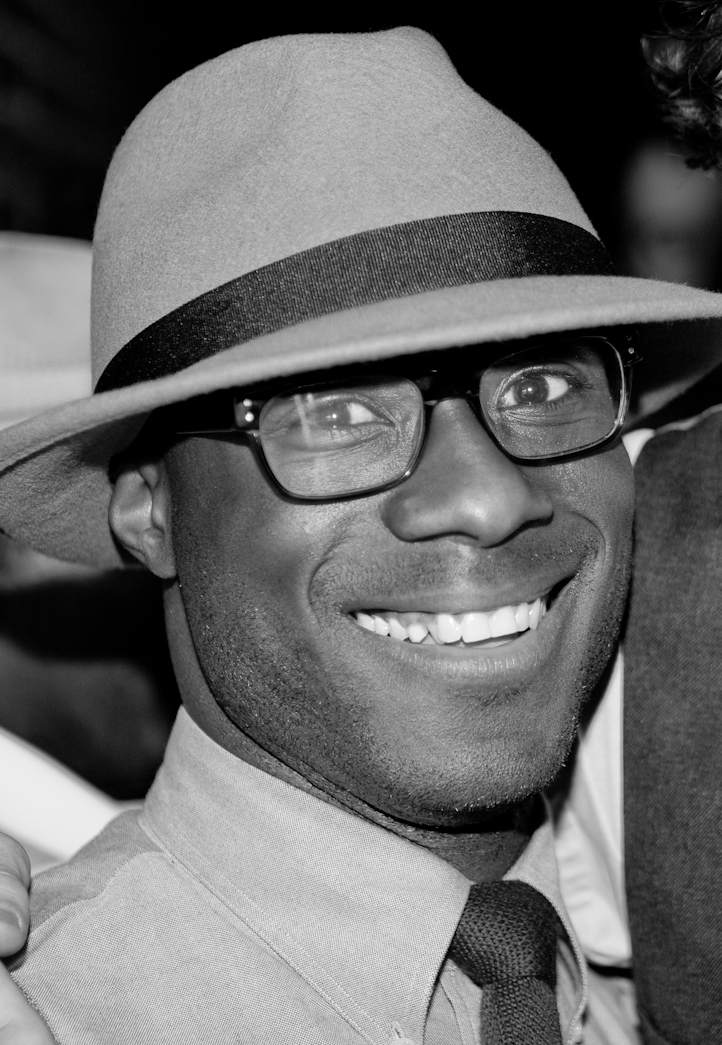
- Barry Jenkins in 2009
Awards and nominations
Award	Wins	Nominations
Academy Awards	1	3
BAFTA Awards	1	4
Golden Globe Awards	0	3
Emmy Awards	0	3
Directors Guild of America Awards	1	2
Writers Guild of America Awards	1	3

Totals (Note: Certain award groups do not simply award one winner. They acknowledge several different recipients, have runners-up, and have third place. Since this is a specific recognition and is different from losing an award, runner-up mentions are considered wins in this award tally. For simplification and to avoid errors, each award in this list has been presumed to have had a prior nomination.)
- Wins: 92
- Nominations: 142

This is a list of awards and nominations received by American filmmaker Barry Jenkins.

Jenkins is an American film director, screenwriter, and producer known for his feature films, Moonlight (2016), an adaptation of the Tarell Alvin McCraney play In Moonlight Black Boys Look Blue and If Beale Street Could Talk (2018) an adaptation of James Baldwin's acclaimed novel of the same name. He is also known for the direction "Episode V" of the Netflix series Dear White People and for direction the Amazon Prime Video limited series The Underground Railroad (2021) based on the Colson Whitehead novel of the same name, for which he was nominated for a Primetime Emmy Award for Outstanding Directing for a Limited Series, Movie, or Dramatic Special and won the BAFTA TV Award for Best International Programme.

He has received three Academy Award nominations, winning Best Adapted Screenplay for Moonlight (2016). He also received nominations from the British Academy Film Awards, the Golden Globe Awards, and the Directors Guild of America.

For his work of Moonlight, Jenkins became the first black filmmaker to ever sweep "The Big Four" critics awards for directing category (LA, NBR, NY, NSFC).

== Major associations ==
=== Academy Awards ===
Year	Category	Nominated work	Result	Ref.
2017	Best Director	Moonlight	Nominated	
2017	Best Adapted Screenplay	Moonlight	Won	
2019	Best Adapted Screenplay	If Beale Street Could Talk	Nominated	

Directed Academy Award performances
Under Jenkins' direction, these actors have received Academy Award nominations and wins for their performances in their respective roles.

Year	Performer	Film	Result
Academy Award for Best Supporting Actor
2016	Mahershala Ali	Moonlight	Won
Academy Award for Best Supporting Actress
2016	Naomie Harris	Moonlight	Nominated
2018	Regina King	If Beale Street Could Talk	Won

=== BAFTA Awards ===
Year	Category	Nominated work	Result	Ref.
2017	Best Film Original Screenplay Writing	Moonlight	Nominated	
2019	Best Film Screenplay Adaptation Writing	If Beale Street Could Talk	Nominated	
2022	Best Television International Programme	The Underground Railroad	Won	
2023	Outstanding British Film	Aftersun	Nominated	

=== Directors Guild Awards ===
Year	Category	Nominated work	Result	Ref.
2017	Outstanding Directing – Feature Film	Moonlight	Nominated	
2022	Outstanding Directing – Miniseries or TV Film	The Underground Railroad	Won	

=== Golden Globe Awards ===
Year	Category	Nominated work	Result	Ref.
2017	Best Director	Moonlight	Nominated	
2017	Best Screenplay	Moonlight	Nominated	
2019	Best Screenplay	If Beale Street Could Talk	Nominated	

=== Primetime Emmy Awards ===
Year	Category	Nominated work	Result	Ref.
2021	Outstanding Directing for a Limited Series or Movie	The Underground Railroad	Nominated	
2021	Outstanding Limited or Anthology Series	The Underground Railroad	Nominated	
2024	Outstanding Limited or Anthology Series	True Detective: Night Country	Nominated	

=== Writers Guild of America Awards ===
Year	Category	Nominated work	Result	Ref.
2017	Best Original Screenplay	Moonlight	Won	
2019	Best Adapted Screenplay	If Beale Street Could Talk	Nominated	
2022	Best Television Long Form – Adapted	The Underground Railroad	Nominated	

== Other awards and nominations ==
=== Black Reel Awards ===
Year	Category	Work	Result	Ref.
2017	Outstanding Director	Moonlight	Won	
2017	Outstanding Screenplay, Adapted or Original	Moonlight	Won	
2019	Outstanding Director	If Beale Street Could Talk	Nominated	
2019	Outstanding Screenplay, Adapted or Original	If Beale Street Could Talk	Nominated	
2021	Outstanding TV Movie or Limited Series	The Underground Railroad	Nominated	
2021	Outstanding Directing, TV Movie/Limited Series	The Underground Railroad	Nominated	
2021	Outstanding Writing, TV Movie/Limited Series	The Underground Railroad	Nominated	

=== British Independent Film Awards ===
Year	Category	Work	Result	Ref.
2025	Best International Independent Film	Sorry, Baby	Nominated	

=== Critics' Choice Awards ===
Year	Category	Work	Result	Ref.
2016	Best Director	Moonlight	Nominated	
2016	Best Original Screenplay	Moonlight	Nominated	
2019	Best Adapted Screenplay	If Beale Street Could Talk	Won	

=== Critics' Choice Television Awards ===
Year	Category	Work	Result	Ref.
2022	Best Limited Series	The Underground Railroad	Nominated	

=== Gotham Awards ===
Year	Category	Work	Result	Ref.
2021	Breakthrough Series – Long Format	The Underground Railroad	Nominated	
2025	Best Feature	Sorry, Baby	Pending	

=== Independent Spirit Award ===
Year	Category	Work	Result	Ref.
2008	Best First Feature	Medicine for Melancholy	Nominated	
2008	Someone to Watch Award	Medicine for Melancholy	Nominated	
2016	Best Director	Moonlight	Won	
2016	Best Screenplay	Moonlight	Won	
2016	Robert Altman Award	Moonlight	Won	
2019	Best Feature	If Beale Street Could Talk	Won	
2019	Best Director	If Beale Street Could Talk	Won	
2022	Best New Scripted Series	The Underground Railroad	Nominated	

=== NAACP Image Awards ===
Year	Category	Work	Result	Ref.
2016	Outstanding Directing in a Motion Picture	Moonlight	Won	
2016	Outstanding Writing in a Motion Picture	Moonlight	Won	
2017	Outstanding Directing in a Comedy Series	Dear White People – "Chapter 5"	Nominated	
2019	Outstanding Directing in a Motion Picture	If Beale Street Could Talk	Nominated	
2019	Outstanding Writing in a Motion Picture	If Beale Street Could Talk	Nominated	
2022	Outstanding Television Movie, Mini-Series or Dramatic Special	The Underground Railroad	Nominated	
2022	Outstanding Directing in a Drama Series	The Underground Railroad	Won	

=== Satellite Awards ===
Year	Category	Work	Result	Ref.
2017	Best Director	Moonlight	Nominated	
2017	Best Original Screenplay	Moonlight	Won	
2019	Best Director	If Beale Street Could Talk	Nominated	
2019	Best Adapted Screenplay	If Beale Street Could Talk	Nominated	

== Critics awards ==
Critics' Awards
Year	Work	Category	Result	Ref.
African-American Film Critics Association Awards
2016	Moonlight	Best Director	Won	
Alliance of Women Film Journalists
2016	Moonlight	Best Director	Won	
2016	Moonlight	Best Writing, Adapted Screenplay	Won	
2019	If Beale Street Could Talk	Best Writing, Adapted Screenplay	Nominated	
Amanda Award
2017	Moonlight	Best Foreign Feature Film	Nominated	
ASECAN Award
2018	Moonlight	Best Foreign Feature Film	Nominated	
Atlantic Film Festival
2016	Moonlight	People's Choice Award - Film	Won	
Austin Film Critics Association Awards
2016	Moonlight	Best Director	Won	
2016	Moonlight	Best Original Screenplay	Won	
2016	Moonlight	Breakthrough Artist Award	Nominated	
2019	If Beale Street Could Talk	Best Director	Won	
2019	If Beale Street Could Talk	Best Adapted Screenplay	Won	
Awards Circuit Community Awards
2016	Moonlight	Best Director	Nominated	
2016	Moonlight	Best Original Screenplay	Nominated	
2019	If Beale Street Could Talk	Best Motion Picturer	Nominated	
2019	If Beale Street Could Talk	Best Director	Nominated	
2019	If Beale Street Could Talk	Best Adapted Screenplay	Won	
Bali International Film Festival
2017	Moonlight	Best Feature Film	Won	
Black Film Critics Circle Awards
2016	Moonlight	Best Director	Won	
2016	Moonlight	Best Original Screenplay	Won	
2018	If Beale Street Could Talk	Best Adapted Screenplay	Won	
Bodil Awards
2018	Moonlight	Best American Film	Nominated	
Central Ohio Film Critics Association
2017	Moonlight	Breakthrough Film Artist	Won	
2017	Moonlight	Best Director	Nominated	
2017	Moonlight	Best Adapted Screenplay	Won	
Chicago Film Critics Awards
2016	Moonlight	Best Director	Won	
2016	Moonlight	Best Original Screenplay	Nominated	
2018	If Beale Street Could Talk	Best Adapted Screenplay	Won	
Chlotrudis Society for Independent Film
2017	Moonlight	Best Director	Won	
Chlotrudis Society for Independent Film
2017	Moonlight	Best Director	Won	
Dallas-Fort Worth Film Critics Association Awards
2016	Moonlight	Best Director	Won	
2016	Moonlight	Best Screenplay	Nominated	
Denver Film Critics Society
2016	Moonlight	Best Director	Won	
2016	Moonlight	Best Original Screenplay	Won	
2019	If Beale Street Could Talk	Best Adapted Screenplay	Nominated	
Detroit Film Critics Society
2016	Moonlight	Breakthrough Film Director	Nominated	
2016	Moonlight	Best Director	Nominated	
2016	Moonlight	Best Adapted Screenplay	Nominated	
Dublin Film Critics Circle Awards
2018	Moonlight	Best Screenplay	Nominated	
Dorian Awards
2017	Moonlight	Wilde Artist of the Year	Nominated	
2017	Moonlight	Director of the Year	Won	
2017	Moonlight	Screenplay of the Year	Won	
2019	If Beale Street Could Talk	Director of the Year	Nominated	
2019	If Beale Street Could Talk	Screenplay of the Year	Nominated	
Florida Film Critics Circle Awards
2016	Moonlight	Breakthrough Film Director	Won	
2016	Moonlight	Best Director	Nominated	
2016	Moonlight	Best Original Screenplay	Nominated	
2018	If Beale Street Could Talk	Best Adapted Screenplay	Nominated	
Georgia Film Critics Association
2017	Moonlight	Breakthrough Film Artist	Won	
2017	Moonlight	Best Director	Nominated	
2017	Moonlight	Best Adapted Screenplay	Won	
2019	If Beale Street Could Talk	Best Director	Nominated	
2019	If Beale Street Could Talk	Best Adapted Screenplay	Nominated	
Gold Derby Awards
2017	Moonlight	Best Director	Nominated	
2017	Moonlight	Best Adapted Screenplay	Won	
2019	If Beale Street Could Talk	Best Motion Picture	Nominated	
2019	If Beale Street Could Talk	Best Adapted Screenplay	Nominated	
Gotham Awards
2008	Medicine for Melancholy	Breakthrough Director	Nominated	
2016	Moonlight	Best Feature	Won	
2016	Moonlight	Best Film - Audience Award	Won	
2018	If Beale Street Could Talk	Best Feature	Nominated	
2018	If Beale Street Could Talk	Best Film - Audience Award	Nominated	
Hawaii Film Critics Society
2017	Moonlight	Best Director	Nominated	
2017	Moonlight	Best Adapted Screenplay	Nominated	
Houston Film Critics Society
2017	Moonlight	Best Director	Nominated	
2017	Moonlight	Best Screenplay	Nominated	
2019	If Beale Street Could Talk	Best Director	Nominated	
2019	If Beale Street Could Talk	Best Screenplay	Nominated	
Indiana Film Journalists Association
2016	Moonlight	Best Adapted Screenplay	Won	
Las Vegas Film Critics Society Awards
2016	Moonlight	Breakthrough Film Artist	Won	
2016	Moonlight	Best Director	Nominated	
2016	Moonlight	Best Original Screenplay	Won	
London Film Critics' Circle
2017	Moonlight	Director of the Year	Nominated	
2017	Moonlight	Screenwriter of the Year	Nominated	
2019	If Beale Street Could Talk	Screenwriter of the Year	Nominated	
Los Angeles Film Critics Association
2008	Medicine for Melancholy	Best Narrative Feature	Nominated	
2017	Moonlight	Best Director	Won	
National Board of Review
2016	Moonlight	Best Director	Won	
2018	If Beale Street Could Talk	Best Adapted Screenplay	Won	
National Society of Film Critics
2017	Moonlight	Best Director	Won	
2017	Moonlight	Best Screenplay	Nominated	
New York Film Critics Online Awards		Best Screenplay		
2016	Moonlight	Best Director	Won	
North Carolina Film Critics Association
2017	Moonlight	Best Director	Nominated	
2017	Moonlight	Best Original Screenplay	Nominated	
2019	If Beale Street Could Talk	Best Director	Nominated	
2019	If Beale Street Could Talk	Best Adapted Screenplay	Won	
Oklahoma Film Critics Circle Awards
2017	Moonlight	Best Director	Nominated	
2017	Moonlight	Best Original Screenplay	Nominated	
2018	If Beale Street Could Talk	Best Adapted Screenplay	Nominated	
Online Film & Television Association Awards
2013	The Big Bang Theory	Best Guest Actress in a Comedy Series	Nominated	
2017	Moonlight	Best Director	Nominated	
2017	Moonlight	Best Original Screenplay	Won	
2019	If Beale Street Could Talk	Best Director	Nominated	
2019	If Beale Street Could Talk	Best Adapted Screenplay	Won	
Palm Springs International Film Festival
2017	Moonlight	Directors to Watch	Won	
Philadelphia Film Critics Circle Awards
2018	If Beale Street Could Talk	Best Director	Won	
San Diego Film Critics Society
2016	Moonlight	Best Director	Nominated	
2016	Moonlight	Best Original Screenplay	Nominated	
San Francisco Film Critics Circle
2008	Medicine for Melancholy	Marlon Riggs Award	Won	
2016	Moonlight	Best Director	Won	
2016	Moonlight	Best Original Screenplay	Won	
2018	If Beale Street Could Talk	Best Director	Nominated	
2018	If Beale Street Could Talk	Best Original Screenplay	Nominated	
Santa Barbara International Film Festival
2017	Moonlight	Outstanding Director	Won	
St. Louis Film Critics Association
2016	Moonlight	Best Director	Nominated	
2016	Moonlight	Best Original Screenplay	Nominated	
2018	If Beale Street Could Talk	Best Adapted Screenplay	Nominated	
Toronto Film Critics Association
2016	Moonlight	Best Director	Nominated	
2016	Moonlight	Best Screenplay, Adapted or Original	Nominated	
Toronto International Film Festival
2018	If Beale Street Could Talk	People's Choice Award	Won	
Utah Film Critics Award
2016	Moonlight	Best Director	Won	
2016	Moonlight	Best Screenplay	Won	
Washington D.C. Area Film Critics Association Awards
2016	Moonlight	Best Director	Nominated	
2016	Moonlight	Best Original Screenplay	Nominated	
2016	If Beale Street Could Talk	Best Director	Nominated	
2016	If Beale Street Could Talk	Best Adapted Screenplay	Nominated	
