= Skate Depot =

Defunct skating rink in Cerritos, California, U.S.

- Address: United States

Construction
- Opened: 1979
- Closed: 2014

Skate Depot was a skating rink in Cerritos, California, United States. The rink opened in 1979 and closed in 2014.

The rink is featured in the HBO documentary film United Skates.
