= Stephan James (actor) =

Canadian actor (born 1993)

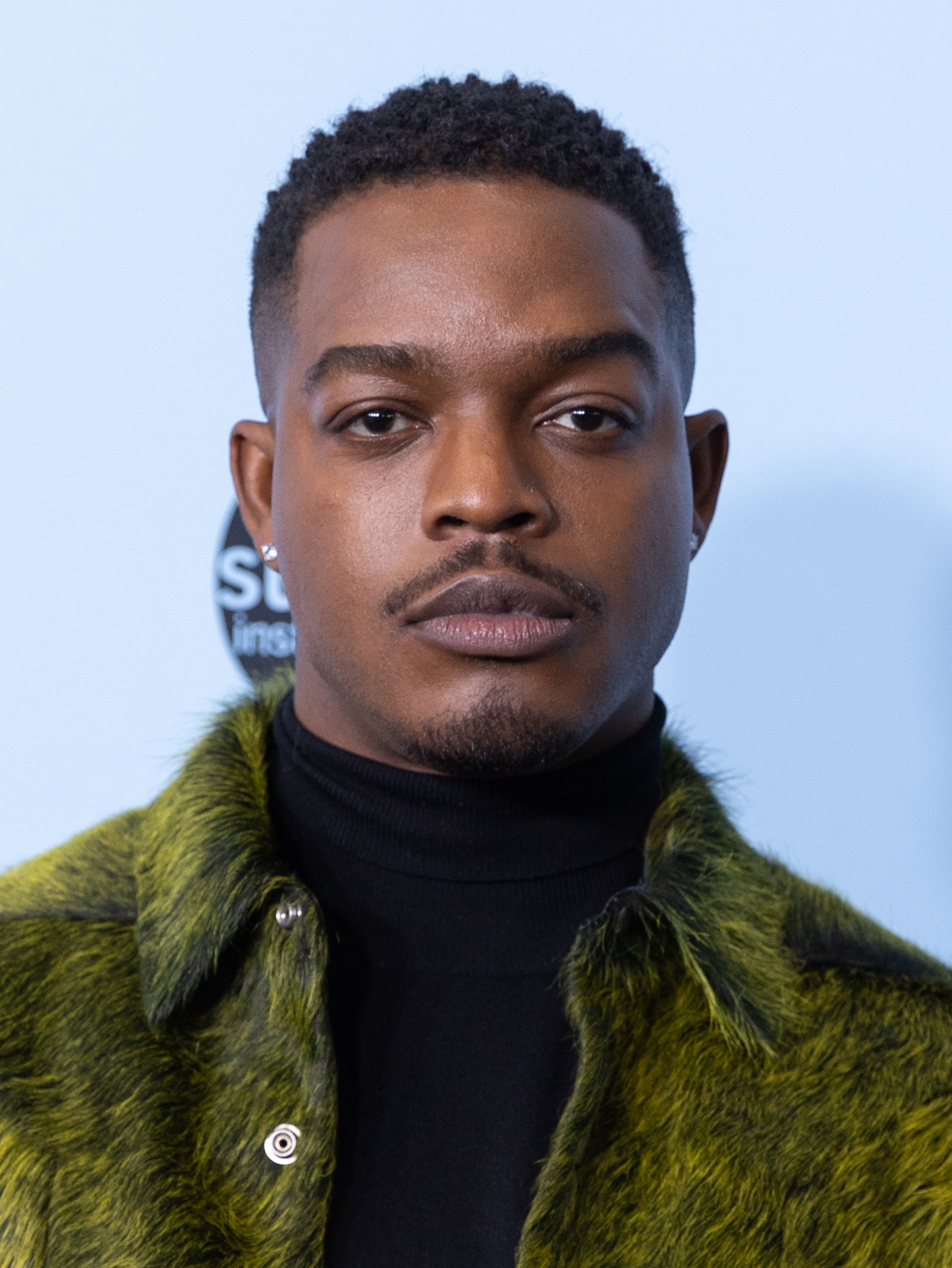
- James at the 2025 Sundance Film Festival
- Born: December 16, 1993 (age 32); Toronto, Ontario, Canada
- Occupation: Actor
- Years active: 2010–present
- Relatives: Shamier Anderson (brother); Sheldon James (brother)

Stephan James (born December 16, 1993) is a Canadian actor. After starring in a string of television series as a teenager, he rose to prominence upon winning a Canadian Screen Award for Best Actor for his role as track and field sprinter Jesse Owens in the 2016 film Race.

In 2018, he starred in Barry Jenkins' acclaimed drama film If Beale Street Could Talk, based on the James Baldwin novel of the same name. Also that year, he portrayed Walter Cruz in the Amazon series Homecoming, for which he received a Golden Globe Award nomination.

== Early life and education ==
Stephan James was born in 1993 in Scarborough, Ontario, which became a district of Toronto in 1998. The middle child of three boys, he is the younger brother of actor Shamier Anderson, whom James credits with inspiring him to get into acting. His family is Jamaican.

He graduated from Jarvis Collegiate Institute in 2011.

== Career ==
=== Early work ===
James got his start in television with a recurring role for two seasons on the long-running Canadian teen series Degrassi. After leaving Degrassi, James played various supporting roles on television, including in How To Be Indie, Clue, and My Babysitter's a Vampire in 2011, and The Listener and The LA Complex in 2012. Also in 2011, he played a supporting role in the ABC Family made-for-TV movie 12 Dates of Christmas.

=== Breakthrough ===
James landed his first major feature film role playing opposite Tatyana Ali and Fefe Dobson in the Canadian film Home Again (2012), in which he played a Jamaican deportee. Although the film received mixed reviews, The Globe and Mail gave James' performance a positive review, calling it "heartbreaking." James garnered a Canadian Screen Award nomination for Best Supporting Actor at the 1st Canadian Screen Awards for his performance, though he ultimately lost to Serge Kanyinda.

In 2013, James was cast as civil rights activist John Lewis in Ava Duvernay's Martin Luther King Jr. film Selma (2014), which went on to be nominated for Best Picture at the Oscars. When asked about the purported "snubs" the film received from the Academy, James said:

To me, I've always seen this film as a victory really, even before I saw the finished version. No award can amount to the way I feel about what we've done with this film. We've done something so relevant to our youth.

In 2015, James guest-starred in the CBC television mini-series The Book of Negroes, based on the award-winning novel of the same name by Lawrence Hill. At the 2015 Toronto International Film Festival, James was named one of the industry's foremost "Rising Stars". In celebration of Black History Month, James was named by CBC as one of their '6 Black Canadian Culture-Makers,' citing Oprah Winfrey as one of his biggest influences.

In 2016, James starred in the lead role of African-American track and field sprinter Jesse Owens in the biopic Race (2016) opposite Jason Sudeikis, replacing Star Wars star John Boyega. For his role in Race, James won the Canadian Screen Award for Best Actor.

In 2017, James played DOJ prosecutor Preston Terry in the FOX limited series, Shots Fired. In 2018, he starred in Barry Jenkins' film adaptation of the James Baldwin novel If Beale Street Could Talk, which was nominated for several Academy Awards. Also that year, he portrayed Walter Cruz, opposite Julia Roberts, Bobby Cannavale, and Shea Whigham, in the Amazon series Homecoming. James received a Golden Globe Award nomination for his performance in Homecoming. More recently, he and Shamier Anderson had signed a deal with Boat Rocker. In February 2022, it was reported that James is attached to star and co-produce a limited series about the life of artist Jean-Michel Basquiat.

== Nonprofit work ==
James and his brother, fellow actor Shamier Anderson, founded a non-profit called B.L.A.C.K. Canada (Building a Legacy in Acting, Cinema + Knowledge) in 2016. In December 2020, they announced an extension of the organization called The Black Academy, which showcases Black talent across Canada in the arts, culture, entertainment and sports. James explained, "We're not short of talent but we are short of opportunities. And so we can only hope that The Black Academy will continue to elevate and inspire the Anglophone and Francophone communities to come together and have one place in which they can build on what they've already started and be celebrated and honored for it, rightfully so." The organization's vision includes building a coalition of supporters who can provide funding, mentorship, programming, and awards to support Black excellence in Canada.

== Filmography ==
=== Film ===
Year	Title	Role	Notes
2012	Home Again	Everton St. Clair	Nominated—Canadian Screen Award for Performance by an Actor in a Supporting Role
2014	Perfect Sisters	Donny	
2014	The Dependables	Shane Jones	
2014	When the Game Stands Tall	Terrance G. "T.K." Kelly	
2014	Selma	John Lewis	Nominated—Black Reel Award for Outstanding Breakthrough Performance, Male
2015	Lost After Dark	Wesley	
2015	Across the Line	Mattie Slaughter	
2016	Race	Jesse Owens	Canadian Screen Award for Best Actor; Nominated—NAACP Image Award for Outstanding Actor in a Motion Picture
2018	If Beale Street Could Talk	Alonzo "Fonny" Hunt	
2019	21 Bridges	Michael Trujillo	
2021	National Champions	LeMarcus James	
2022	Delia's Gone	Louis	
2024	Babes	Claude	
2024	The Piano Lesson	Boy Charles	
2025	Ricky	Ricky	
2025	Night Always Comes	Cody	
2026	War Machine	Staff Sergeant 7	
2026	I Play Rocky	Carl Weathers	

=== Television ===
Year	Title	Role	Notes
2010	My Babysitter's a Vampire	Jock	Television film
2010–2011	How to Be Indie	Wilfred	3 episodes
2010–2012	Degrassi: The Next Generation	Julian Williams	8 episodes
2011	My Babysitter's a Vampire	Jock #1	Episode: "Smells Like Trouble"
2011	Clue	Dmitri	5 episodes
2011	12 Dates of Christmas	Michael	Television film
2012	The Listener	Ibrahim Ayim	Episode: "The Taking"
2012	The L.A. Complex	Infinite Jest	5 episodes
2013	Cracked	Ben Omari	Episode: "Faces"
2014	The Gabby Douglas Story	John 16-18 Years	Television film
2014	Apple Mortgage Cake	William Logan	Television film
2015	Unveiled	Daniel Shepard	Television film
2015	The Book of Negroes	Cummings Shakspear	Episode #1.5
2017	Shots Fired	Preston Terry	10 episodes
2018–2020	Homecoming	Walter Cruz	16 episodes Nominated—Golden Globe Award for Best Actor – Television Series Drama
2020	#FreeRayshawn	Rayshawn Morris	12 episodes Nominated—Primetime Emmy Award for Outstanding Actor in a Short Form Comedy or Drama Series
2022	Surface	Baden	Main role
2023	Beacon 23	Halan Kai Nelson	Main role
TBA	Discretion	Logan	Main role

== Awards and nominations ==
Association	Year	Work	Category	Result	Ref.
Black Film Critics Circle Awards	2014	Selma	Best Ensemble	Won	
Black Reel Awards	2015	Selma	Outstanding Breakthrough Performance, Male	Nominated	
Black Reel Awards	2017	Shots Fired	Outstanding Actor, TV Movie/Limited Series	Nominated	
Black Reel Awards	2019	If Beale Street Could Talk	Outstanding Actor	Nominated	
Canadian Screen Awards	2013	Home Again	Outstanding Performance by an Actor in a Supporting Role	Nominated	
Canadian Screen Awards	2017	Race	Outstanding Performance by an Actor in a Leading Role	Won	
Canadian Screen Awards	2019		Radius Award	Won	
Critics' Choice Movie Awards	2015	Selma	Best Ensemble	Nominated	
Golden Globe Awards	2019	Homecoming	Best Performance in a Television Series – Drama	Nominated	
Georgia Film Critics Association	2014	Selma	Best Ensemble	Nominated	
Georgia Film Critics Association	2018	If Beale Street Could Talk	Best Ensemble	Nominated	
NAACP Image Awards	2017	Race	Outstanding Actor in a Motion Picture	Nominated	
NAACP Image Awards	2019	If Beale Street Could Talk	Outstanding Actor in a Motion Picture	Nominated	
NAACP Image Awards	2021	#FreeRayshawn	Outstanding Performance in a Short-Form Series	Nominated	
Primetime Emmy Awards	2020	#FreeRayshawn	Outstanding Actor in a Short Form Comedy or Drama Series	Nominated	
San Diego Film Critics Society	2014	Selma	Best Acting Ensemble	Nominated	
Seattle Film Critics Society	2018	If Beale Street Could Talk	Best Ensemble Cast	Nominated	
Washington D.C. Area Film Critics Association	2015	Selma	Best Acting Ensemble	Nominated	
Washington D.C. Area Film Critics Association	2018	If Beale Street Could Talk	Best Acting Ensemble	Nominated	
Women Film Critics Circle	2018	If Beale Street Could Talk (with KiKi Layne)	Best Screen Couple	Won	
