= United Skates =

2018 American documentary film

- Directed by: Tina Brown; Dyana Winkler
- Written by: Dyana Winkler
- Cinematography: Matthew Peterson; Tina Brown; Dyana Winkler
- Edited by: Katharine Garrison
- Music by: Jongnic Bontemps; James Lawrence Winkler
- Production companies: Get Lifted Film Co.; Los Angeles Media Fund; Naked Edge Films; Secret Sauce Media
- Distributed by: HBO Films
- Release dates: April 19, 2018 (Tribeca); February 18, 2019 (United States)
- Running time: 89 minutes
- Country: United States
- Language: English

United Skates is a 2018 American documentary film directed by Dyana Winkler and Tina Brown about African-American roller skating culture. The film was executive produced by John Legend and features Salt-N-Pepa, Coolio and Naughty By Nature. The film features several notable roller rinks in the United States, including Skate Depot and World on Wheels.

Its world premiere was held at the Tribeca Film Festival on April 19, 2018. It aired on HBO on February 18, 2019. It later was shown as part of the BBC Four's Storyville on October 2, 2021.
