= World on Wheels =

Defunct roller rink in Los Angeles, California, U.S.

- Interactive map of World on Wheels
- Location: Los Angeles, California, U.S.
- Coordinates: 34.04752°N 118.33863°W

World on Wheels was a roller rink in Los Angeles, California, United States that focused on Hip Hop and R&B. The rink opened in 1981, then closed in 2013 due to filing bankruptcy. After reopening in 2017 from Nipsey Hussle's investments, it closed again in 2020.

The rink is featured in the HBO documentary film United Skates.
