= Rhea L. Combs =

American curator

- Education: Howard University (BA); Cornell University (MA); Emory University (PhD)
- Employer: National Portrait Gallery
- Website: rheacombs.com

Rhea L. Combs is an American curator. She is the current Director of Curatorial Affairs at the National Portrait Gallery, and her previous roles include leadership at the National Museum of African American History and Culture, as well as curatorial involvement in institutions like the Schomburg Center for Research in Black Culture and the Institute of Contemporary Arts. Her published work spans Black pop culture, filmmaking, aesthetics, photography, and other related matters of art, media, and culture in the African diaspora.

== Early life and education ==
Combs earned a bachelor's degree in Communications from Howard University, as well as a master's degree in African American Studies from Cornell University and a PhD from Emory University. Her doctoral studies were concentrated on Black cultural production, film, and gender.

== Career ==
Early on in her career, Combs worked in curation at the Spelman College Museum of Fine Art and as an educator at the Chicago Historical Society. In addition to her curatorial work, Combs taught courses on "visual culture, film, race and gender" at Chicago State University, Emory University, and Lewis & Clark College.

Starting in 2013, Combs worked played a role in the reopening of the National Museum of African American History and Culture in 2016. She then became the head of its Earl W. and Amanda Stafford Center for African American Media Arts, as well as a curator of photography and film. There, she co-curated shows like Rising Up: Hale Woodruff's Murals at Talladega College and Through the African American Lens: Selections from the Permanent Collection of NMAAHC.

Additionally, Combs curated and led organizing efforts on the museum's inaugural Smithsonian African American Film Festival in 2018. Combs has also curated film exhibitions for institutions like the Schomburg Center for Research in Black Culture, Institute of Contemporary Arts, and Black Public Media.

On April 6, 2021, Combs was announced as the Director of Curatorial Affairs at the National Portrait Gallery. She began the role on May 10. In 2024, she curated an exhibition on James Baldwin, titled This Morning, This Evening, So Soon: James Baldwin and the Voices of Queer Resistance.
