= If Beale Street Could Talk (film) =

2018 film directed by Barry Jenkins

- Theatrical release poster
- Directed by: Barry Jenkins
- Screenplay by: Barry Jenkins
- Based on: If Beale Street Could Talk by James Baldwin
- Produced by: Adele Romanski; Sara Murphy; Barry Jenkins; Dede Gardner; Jeremy Kleiner
- Starring: KiKi Layne; Stephan James; Colman Domingo; Teyonah Parris; Michael Beach; Dave Franco; Diego Luna; Pedro Pascal; Ed Skrein; Brian Tyree Henry; Regina King
- Cinematography: James Laxton
- Edited by: Joi McMillon; Nat Sanders
- Music by: Nicholas Britell
- Production companies: Annapurna Pictures; Plan B Entertainment; Pastel Productions
- Distributed by: Annapurna Pictures
- Release dates: September 9, 2018 (TIFF); December 14, 2018 (United States)
- Running time: 117 minutes
- Country: United States
- Language: English
- Budget: $12 million
- Box office: $21.4 million

If Beale Street Could Talk is a 2018 American romantic drama film written and directed by Barry Jenkins and based on James Baldwin's 1974 novel. It stars an ensemble cast that includes KiKi Layne, Stephan James, Colman Domingo, Teyonah Parris, Michael Beach, Dave Franco, Diego Luna, Pedro Pascal, Ed Skrein, Brian Tyree Henry, and Regina King. The film follows a young woman who, with her family's support, seeks to clear the name of her wrongly charged lover and prove his innocence before the birth of their child.

Following the success of Jenkins's Moonlight (2016), it was announced in July 2017 that he would direct an adaptation of Baldwin's novel, from a screenplay that he wrote in 2013. Principal photography began in October 2017 in New York City and the cast was announced that month.

If Beale Street Could Talk had its world premiere at the Toronto International Film Festival on September 9, 2018, and was theatrically released in the United States on December 14, 2018, by Annapurna Pictures. It was praised for its acting, Jenkins's screenplay and direction, cinematography, and the musical score. It was chosen by both the National Board of Review and the American Film Institute as one of the Top 10 Films of 2018. The film received numerous accolades, including Best Supporting Actress wins for King at the Academy Awards and Golden Globes. It was also nominated for Best Motion Picture – Drama and Best Screenplay at the 76th Golden Globe Awards, and Best Adapted Screenplay and Best Original Score at the 91st Academy Awards.

== Plot ==
Note: The film's structure is non-linear, but this plot summary is written in a linear fashion.

Clementine "Tish" Rivers and Alonzo "Fonny" Hunt have been friends all their lives, and become romantically involved. In the 1970s, they struggle to find an apartment, as most New York landlords would not rent to black people. They find a place in a warehouse being converted to loft apartments; Levy, the Jewish landlord, rents it to them because he enjoys seeing couples who are in love.

Tish is assaulted by a man in a mostly white grocery store and Fonny physically throws him out. White policeman Officer Bell is about to arrest Fonny but reluctantly lets him go when the Jewish proprietor vouches for them and chastises Bell for his racism.

Fonny is later arrested for the rape of a woman named Victoria Rogers. Although it is nearly impossible for him to have gone from the scene of the crime to the apartment where he was arrested in the time available, the case against Fonny is considered strong due to Officer Bell's testimony. He claims he saw Fonny fleeing the scene, and Victoria identifies Fonny in a lineup. Tish and Fonny's friend Daniel Carty were with him at the time of the rape, but the alibi is considered unreliable due to Tish and Fonny's relationship and Daniel's previous conviction for grand theft auto.

Tish visits Fonny in jail as he awaits trial and reveals that she is pregnant with their baby. Fonny is excited to be a father, but saddened that the birth might be while he is behind bars. Tish tells her parents, Sharon and Joseph, and sister, Ernestine, about her pregnancy. Though worried for her, Tish's family is supportive and invite Fonny's family over to share the news.

Fonny's divorced father Frank is excited but Fonny's mother Alice declares that as the child was conceived out of wedlock, Tish and her child are damned. Frank hits his ex-wife and, as Alice is leaving with her daughters, Sharon reminds her that she has just condemned her own grandchild.

In a bar, Frank and Joseph discuss how the former is worried about paying for a child and Fonny's legal expenses, but Joseph convinces him that they will be able to provide for their grandchild the same way they provided for their own children.

Sharon travels to Victoria's native Puerto Rico to plead with her to change her testimony but Victoria refuses. Victoria says the police told her to identify Fonny in the line-up. When Sharon gently touches her, Victoria begins to scream. An elderly woman takes Victoria away. Tish gives birth to her son without Fonny, who eventually accepts a plea deal.

Tish and their child, Alonzo Jr., visit Fonny in prison. They share snacks while looking forward to Fonny's release.

== Cast ==
- KiKi Layne as Clementine "Tish" Rivers
  - Milanni Mines as young Tish
- Stephan James as Alonzo "Fonny" Hunt
  - Ethan Barrett as young Fonny
- Regina King as Sharon Rivers, Tish's mother
- Teyonah Parris as Ernestine Rivers, Tish's sister
- Colman Domingo as Joseph Rivers, Tish's father
- Brian Tyree Henry as Daniel Carty, Fonny's friend and a recent parolee
- Ed Skrein as Officer Bell, a police officer who testifies against Fonny
- Emily Rios as Victoria Rogers, a rape victim who misidentifies Fonny
- Michael Beach as Frank Hunt, Fonny's father
- Aunjanue Ellis as Alice Hunt, Fonny's mother
- Ebony Obsidian as Adrienne Hunt, Fonny's sister
- Dominique Thorne as Sheila Hunt, Fonny's sister
- Finn Wittrock as Hayward, Fonny's lawyer
- Diego Luna as Pedrocito, a waiter and Fonny's friend
- Pedro Pascal as Pietro Alvarez, a man who sets up the meeting between Victoria and Sharon
- Dave Franco as Levy, a Jewish landlord
- Marcia Jean Kurtz as a Jewish grocer
- Bobby Conte-Thornton as an Italian punk
- Kaden Byrd as Alonzo Jr., Tish's and Fonny's son

== Production ==
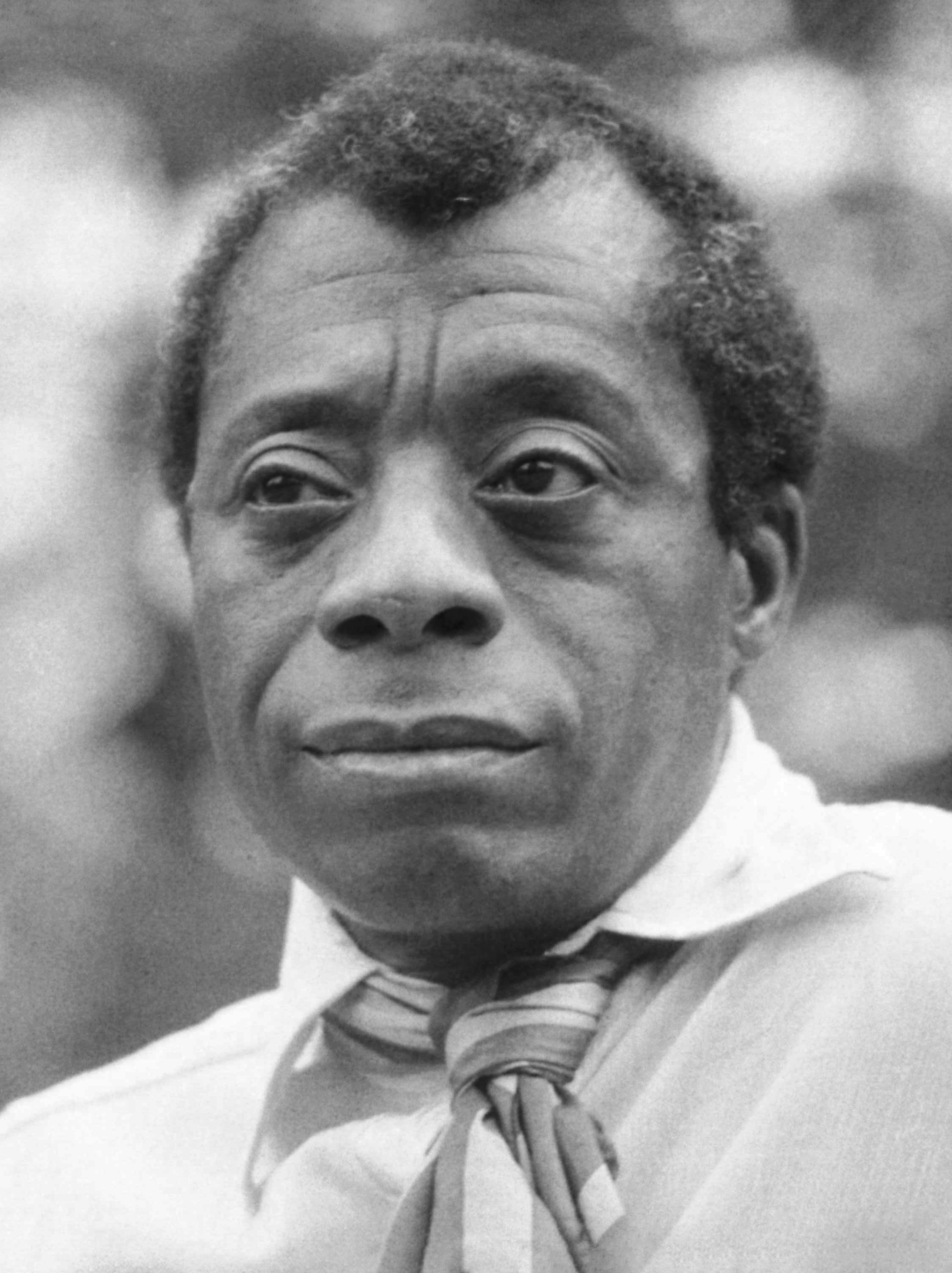
If Beale Street Could Talk author James Baldwin

On July 10, 2017, it was announced that Barry Jenkins would direct an adaptation of James Baldwin's novel If Beale Street Could Talk. Jenkins wrote the screenplay during the summer of 2013, as he was writing Moonlight.

On August 29, 2017, Stephan James was set to star. In September 2017, KiKi Layne and Teyonah Parris were also added, with Layne in the female lead. Lin-Manuel Miranda was almost cast in the film, but he was ultimately not, though he and Jenkins got acquainted and kept in touch since.

On October 18, 2017, it was reported that If Beale Street Could Talk had begun filming in New York City. That same month, Regina King, Colman Domingo, Brian Tyree Henry, Dave Franco, and Ed Skrein joined the cast of the film. Michael Beach, Finn Wittrock, Aunjanue Ellis, and Diego Luna were added in November, and in December 2017, Pedro Pascal and Emily Rios joined. In March 2018, Nicholas Britell was announced as the composer of the film's score.

== Release ==
If Beale Street Could Talk began a limited release in the United States on December 14, 2018, with an expanded release on December 25. It had previously been scheduled for November 30, 2018. The film had its world premiere at the Toronto International Film Festival on September 9, 2018. It also screened at the New York Film Festival on October 11, 2018, the New Orleans Film Festival on October 21, 2018, and the St. Louis International Film Festival on November 10, 2018.

== Reception ==
=== Box office ===
If Beale Street Could Talk grossed $14.9 million in the United States and Canada, and $6.5 million in other territories, for a worldwide total of $21.4 million.

During its opening weekend, December 14, the film made $219,174 from four theaters, for a per-venue average of $54,794, one of the best of 2018. In its second weekend, the film earned $114,902, and in its third made $759,578 from 65 theaters. In its fourth weekend, the film expanded to 335 theaters, earning $1.9 million. The next weekend, January 11, following its Golden Globe win the film expanded to 1,018 theaters and grossed $2.3 million.

=== Critical response ===
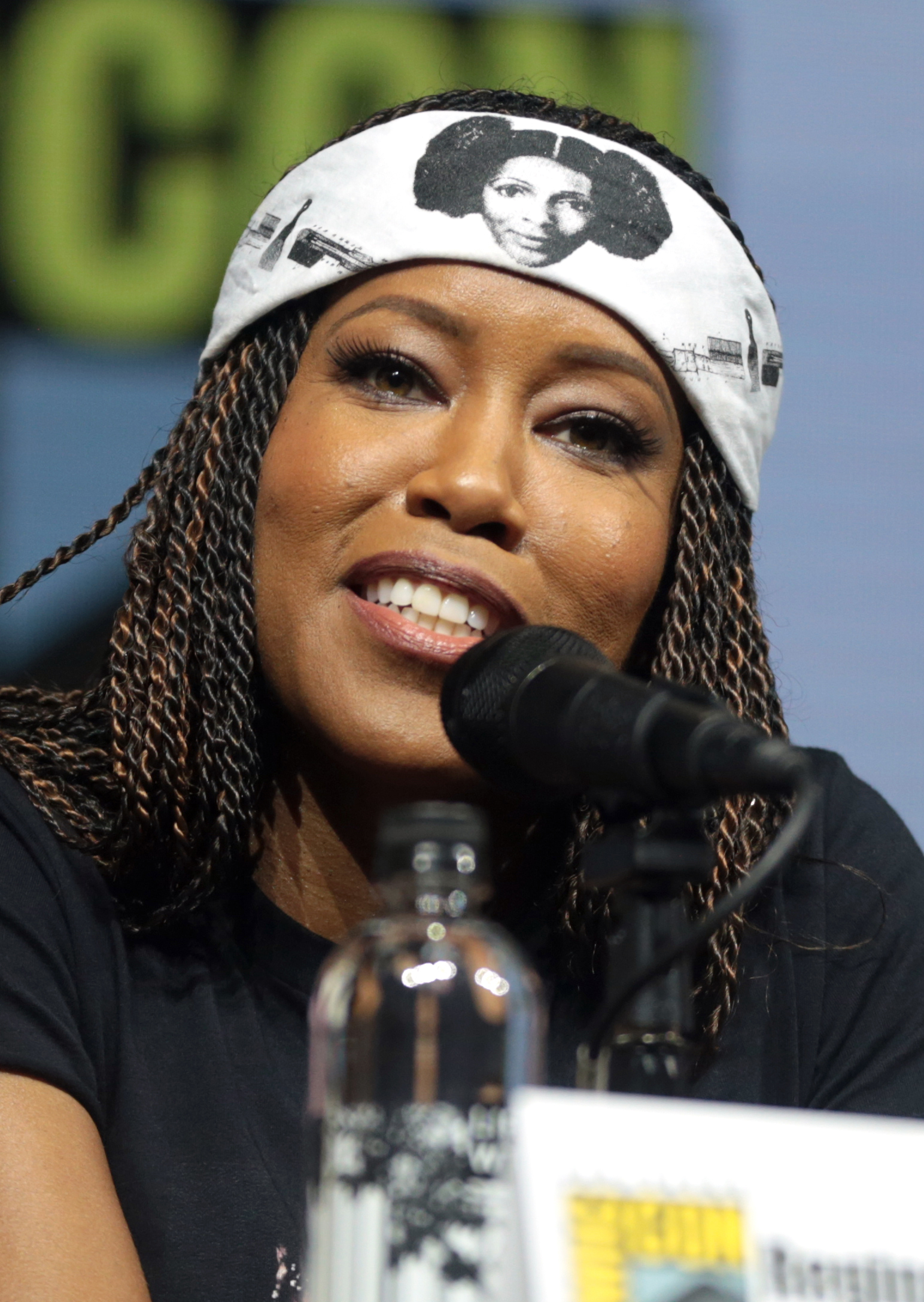
Regina King's performance received widespread critical acclaim and earned her the Academy Award for Best Supporting Actress.

On review aggregator Rotten Tomatoes, the film holds an approval rating of 95%, based on 363 reviews, with an average rating of 8.6/10. The website's critical consensus reads: "If Beale Street Could Talk honors its source material with a beautifully filmed adaptation that finds director Barry Jenkins further strengthening his visual and narrative craft." On Metacritic, the film has a weighted average score of 87 out of 100, based on 53 critics, indicating "universal acclaim". Audiences polled by PostTrak gave the film an 82% overall positive score and a 65% "definite recommend".

Eric Kohn of IndieWire gave the film an "A−", stating: "Jenkins' follow-up to Moonlight also maintains his own expressionistic aesthetic, with its lush colors and entrancing faces that speak volumes in few words, resulting in a fascinating hybrid experience — a seminal voice of the past merging with one of the present in a mesmerizing burst of creative passion." Siddhant Adlakha of /Film said the film felt "electric and alive", and specified: "The worlds these characters create — whether in the form of individual, soul-piercing stares, or moments of burning passion filmed in profile — carry with them the weight of the very history of which Tish constantly speaks."

=== Accolades ===
At the 76th Golden Globe Awards, the film was nominated for three awards: Best Motion Picture – Drama, Best Supporting Actress for King, and Best Screenplay, with King winning. At the 91st Academy Awards, the film was nominated for Best Adapted Screenplay, Best Original Score, and Best Supporting Actress for Regina King, with King winning. At the 24th Critics' Choice Awards, the film received five nominations, including Best Picture, Best Supporting Actress for King, and Best Adapted Screenplay.

Both the National Board of Review and American Film Institute included it in their top 10 films of 2018, and former U.S. President Barack Obama listed the film among his favorite movies of 2018.

== See also ==
- List of black films of the 2010s
