= 76th Golden Globe Awards =

US film and TV award ceremony in 2019

- Date: January 6, 2019
- Site: The Beverly Hilton, Beverly Hills, California, U.S.
- Hosted by: Sandra Oh; Andy Samberg

Highlights
- Best Film: Drama: Bohemian Rhapsody
- Best Film: Musical or Comedy: Green Book
- Best Drama Series: The Americans
- Best Musical or Comedy Series: The Kominsky Method
- Best Miniseries or Television movie: The Assassination of Gianni Versace: American Crime Story
- Most awards: Green Book (3)
- Most nominations: Vice (6)

Television coverage
- Network: NBC

The 76th ceremony of the Golden Globe Awards honored the best in film and American television of 2018, as chosen by the Hollywood Foreign Press Association (HFPA). Produced by Dick Clark Productions and the HFPA, the ceremony was broadcast live on January 6, 2019, from the Beverly Hilton in Beverly Hills, California beginning at 5:00 p.m. PST / 8:00 p.m. EST. The ceremony aired live on NBC in the United States. Actors Sandra Oh and Andy Samberg hosted the ceremony.

The nominees were announced on December 6, 2018, by Terry Crews, Danai Gurira, Leslie Mann, and Christian Slater. The ceremony marked the debut of a new non-competitive award rewarding excellence in television, the Carol Burnett Award, with Carol Burnett herself being the inaugural recipient.

Green Book won the most awards for the ceremony with three, including Best Motion Picture – Musical or Comedy. Bohemian Rhapsody and Roma won two awards each. In television, The Kominsky Method and The Assassination of Gianni Versace: American Crime Story were the most awarded, with two awards each. Jeff Bridges was honored with the Cecil B. DeMille Award for career achievement.

== Winners and nominees ==
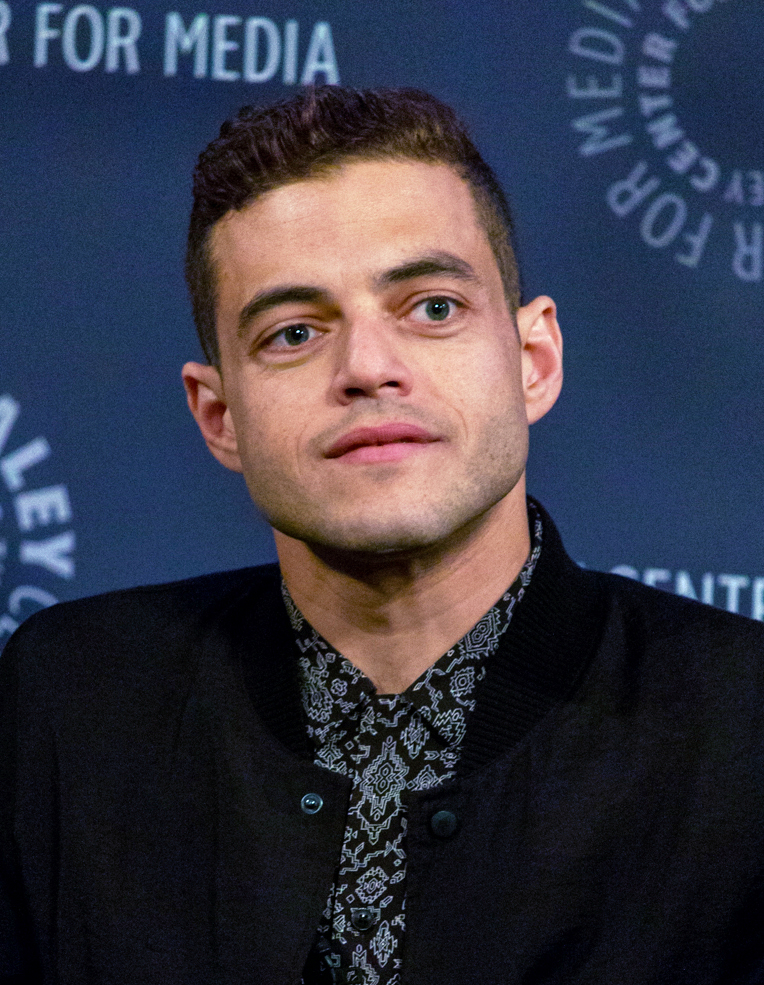
Rami Malek, Best Actor in a Motion Picture – Drama winner

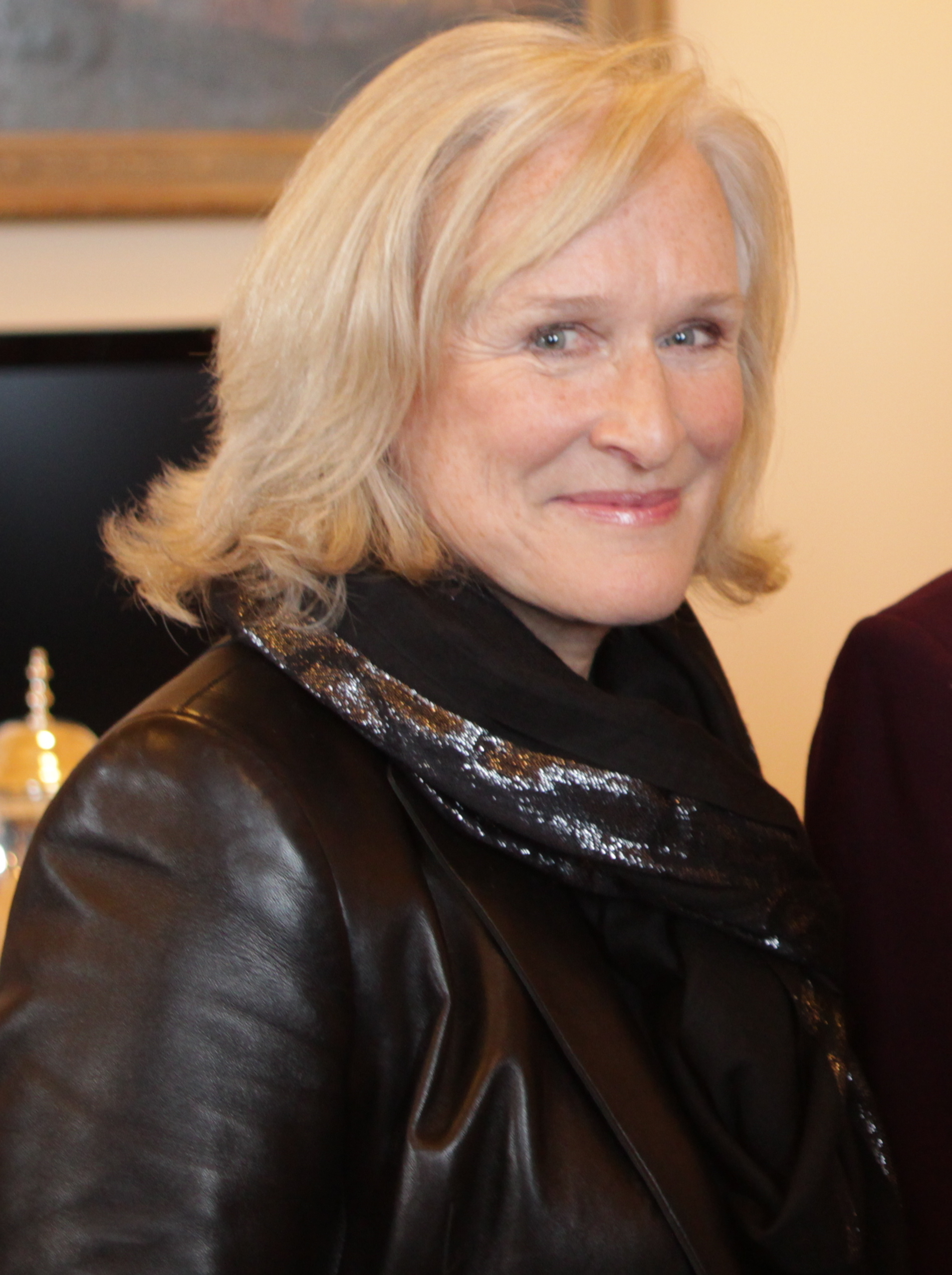
Glenn Close, Best Actress in a Motion Picture – Drama winner

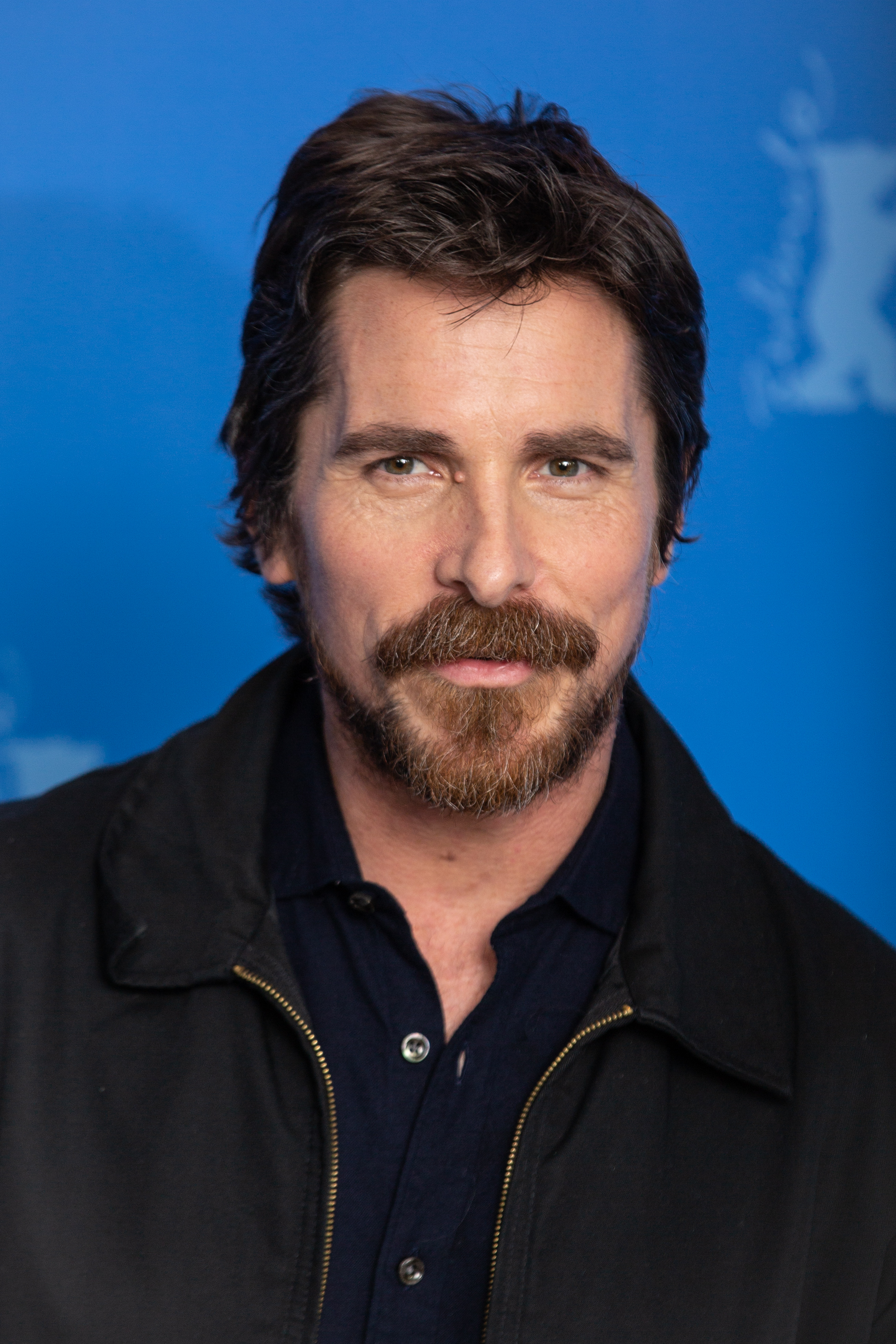
Christian Bale, Best Actor in a Motion Picture – Musical or Comedy winner

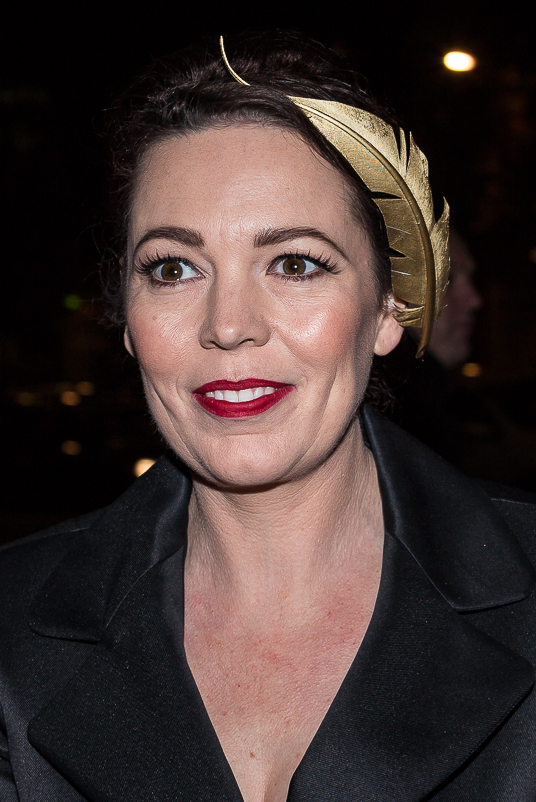
Olivia Colman, Best Actress in a Motion Picture – Musical or Comedy winner

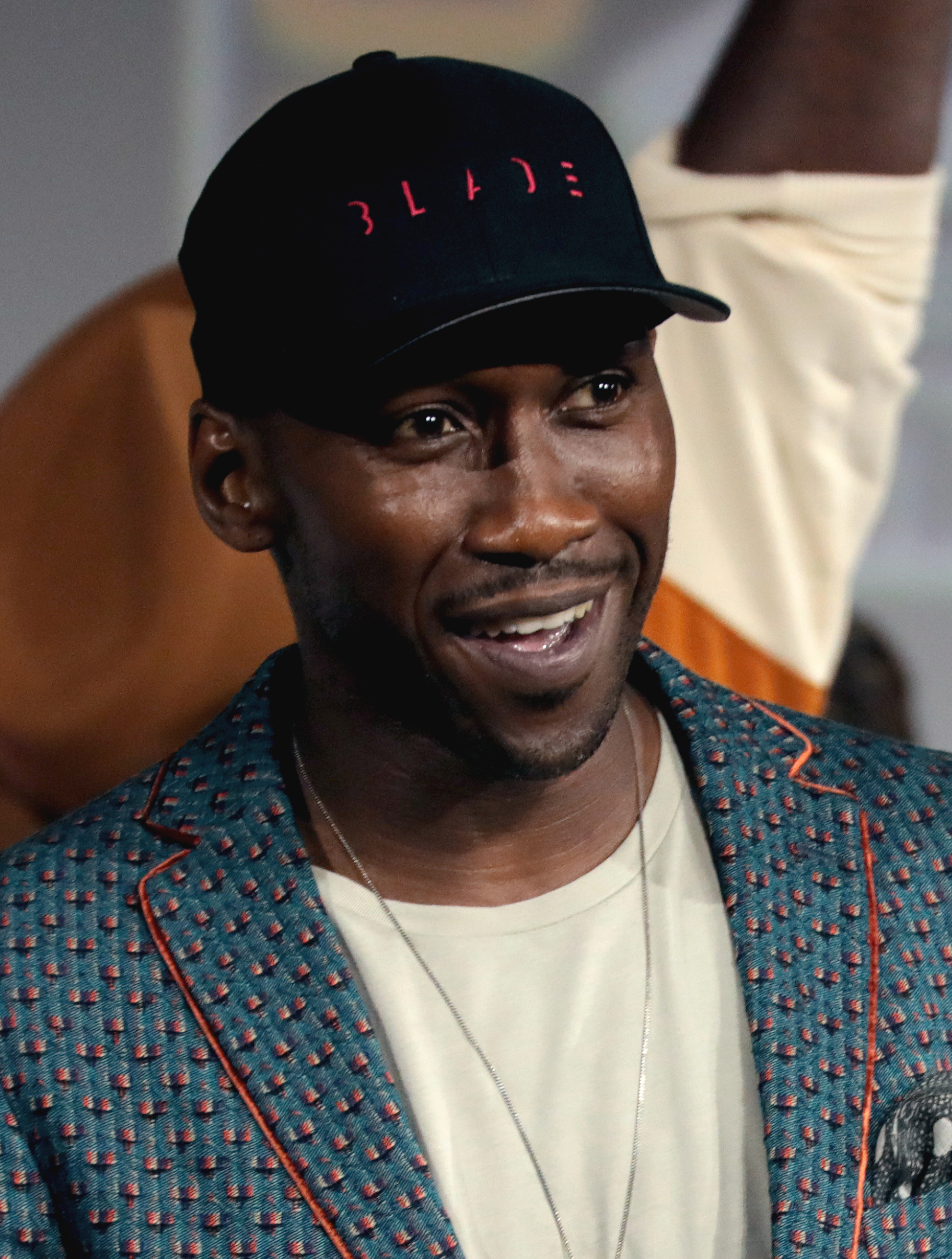
Mahershala Ali, Best Supporting Actor winner

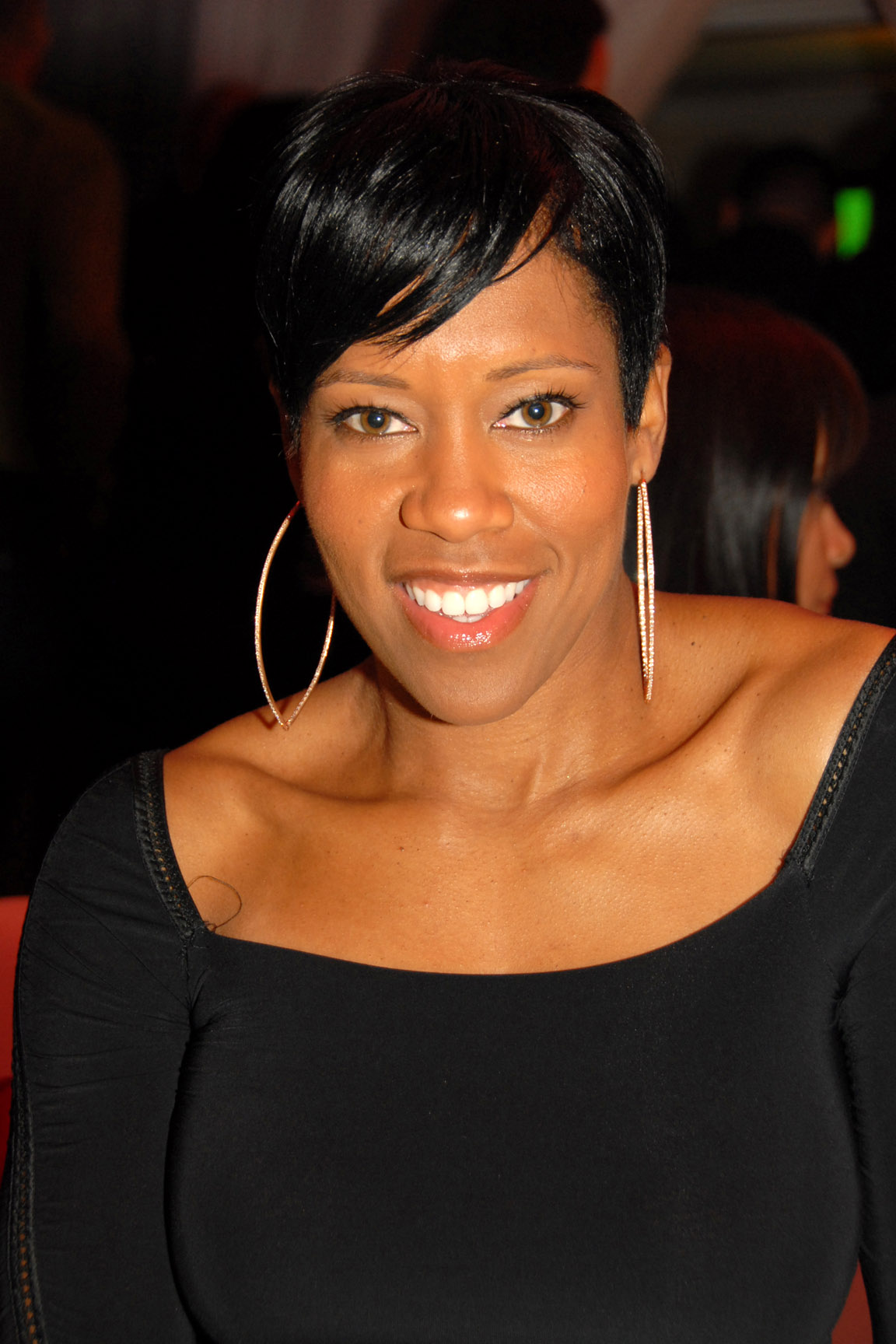
Regina King, Best Supporting Actress winner

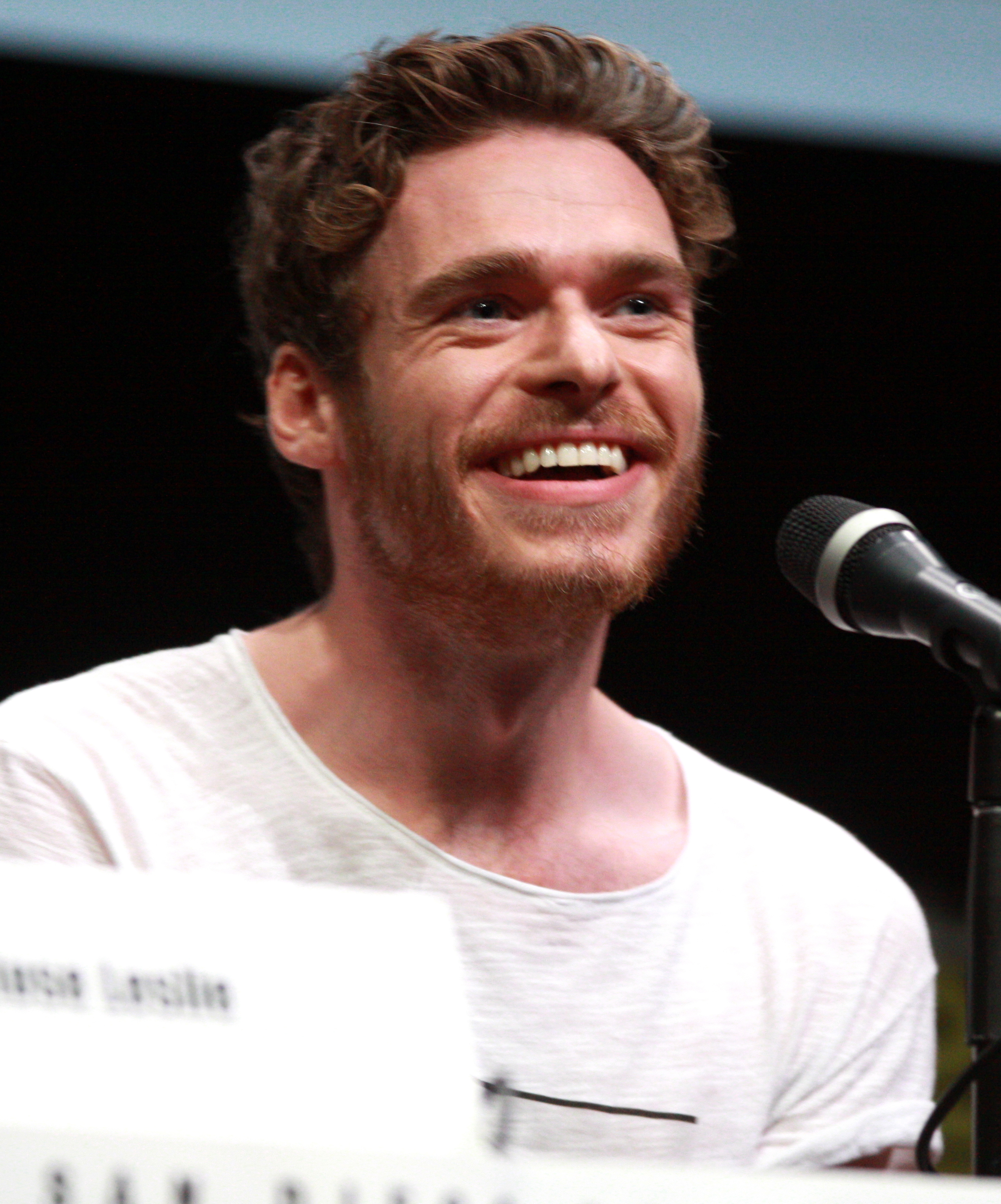
Richard Madden, Best Actor in a Television Series – Drama winner

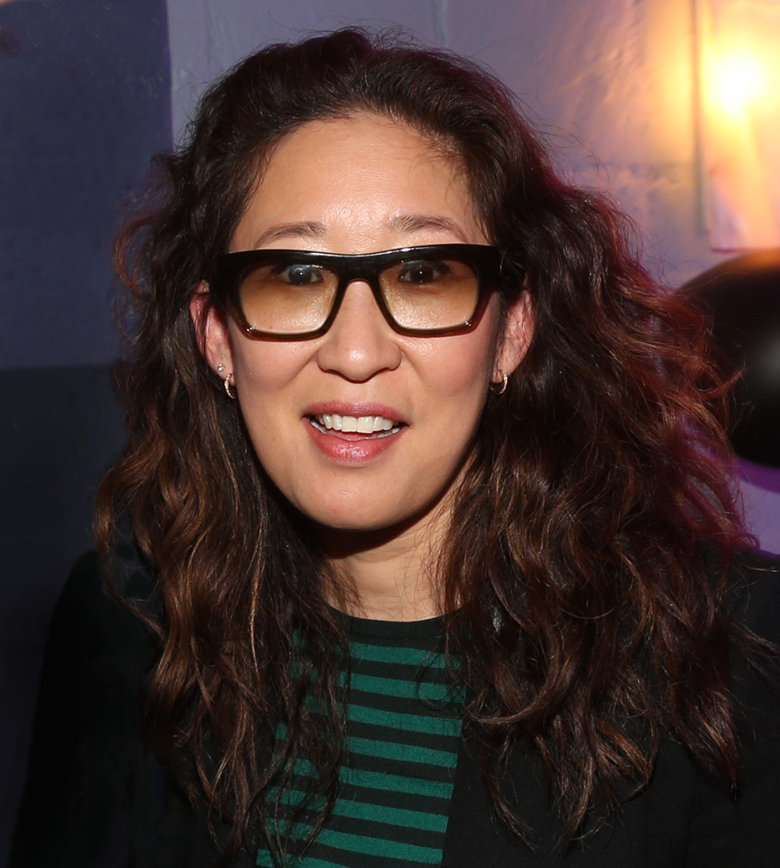
Sandra Oh, Best Actress in a Television Series – Drama winner

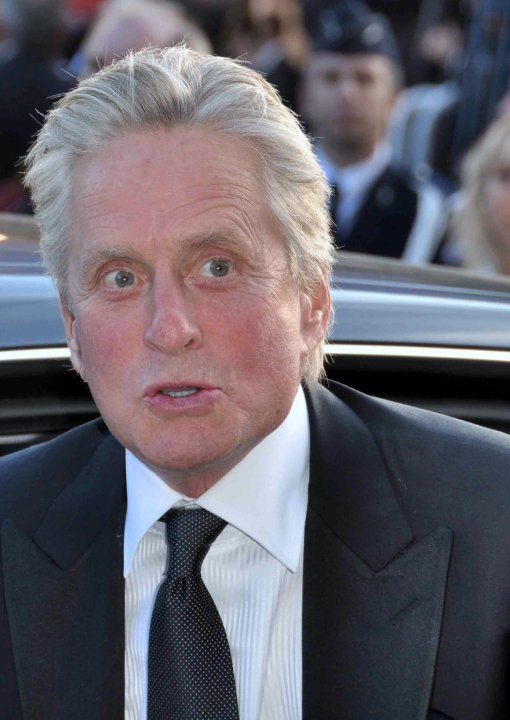
Michael Douglas, Best Actor in a Television Series – Comedy or Musical winner

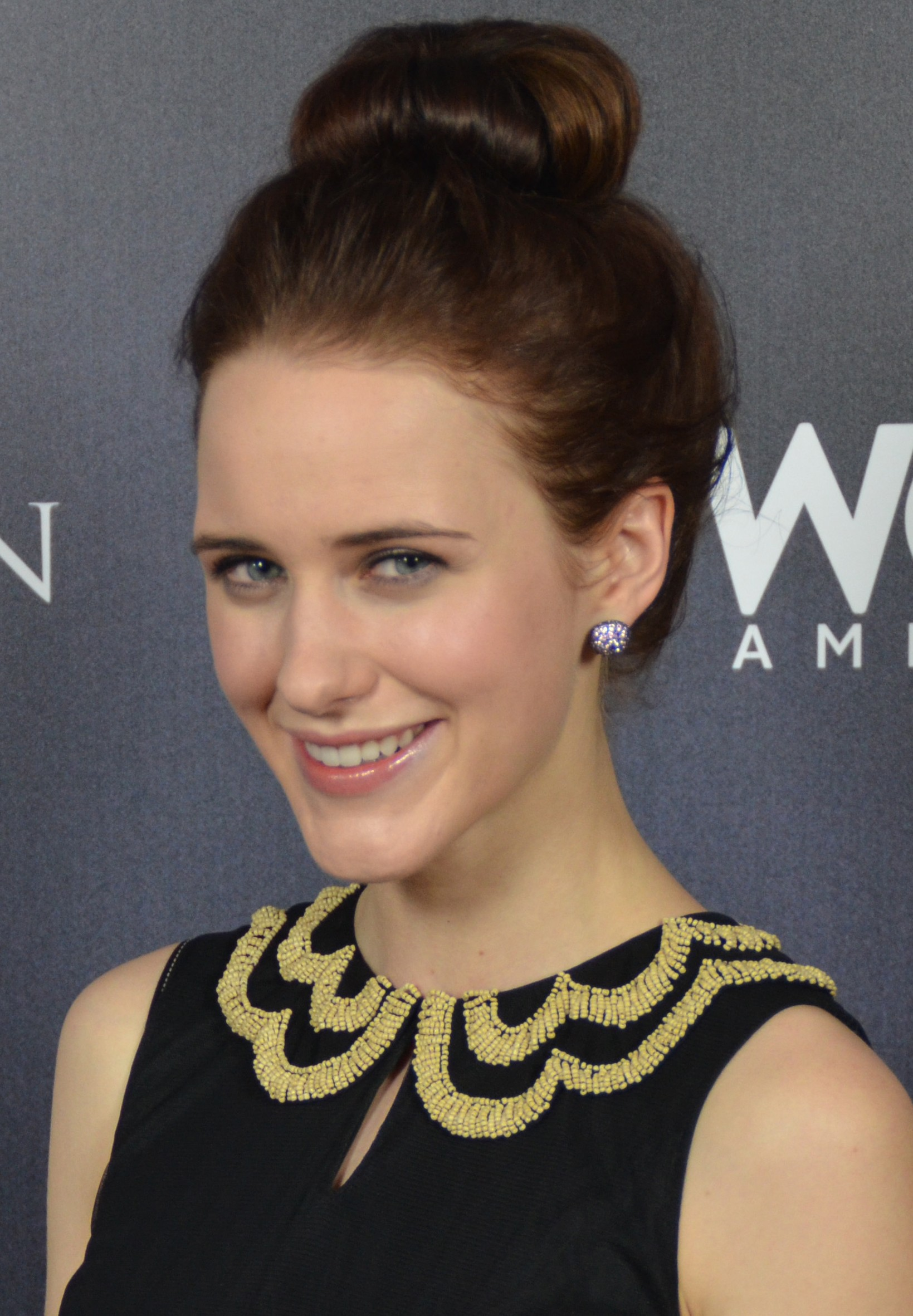
Rachel Brosnahan, Best Actress in a Television Series – Comedy or Musical winner

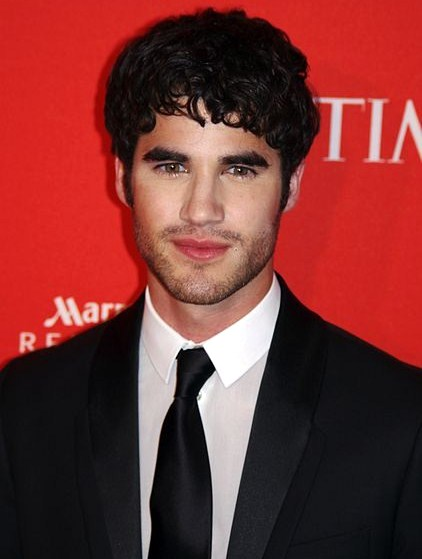
Darren Criss, Best Actor in a Miniseries or Television Film winner

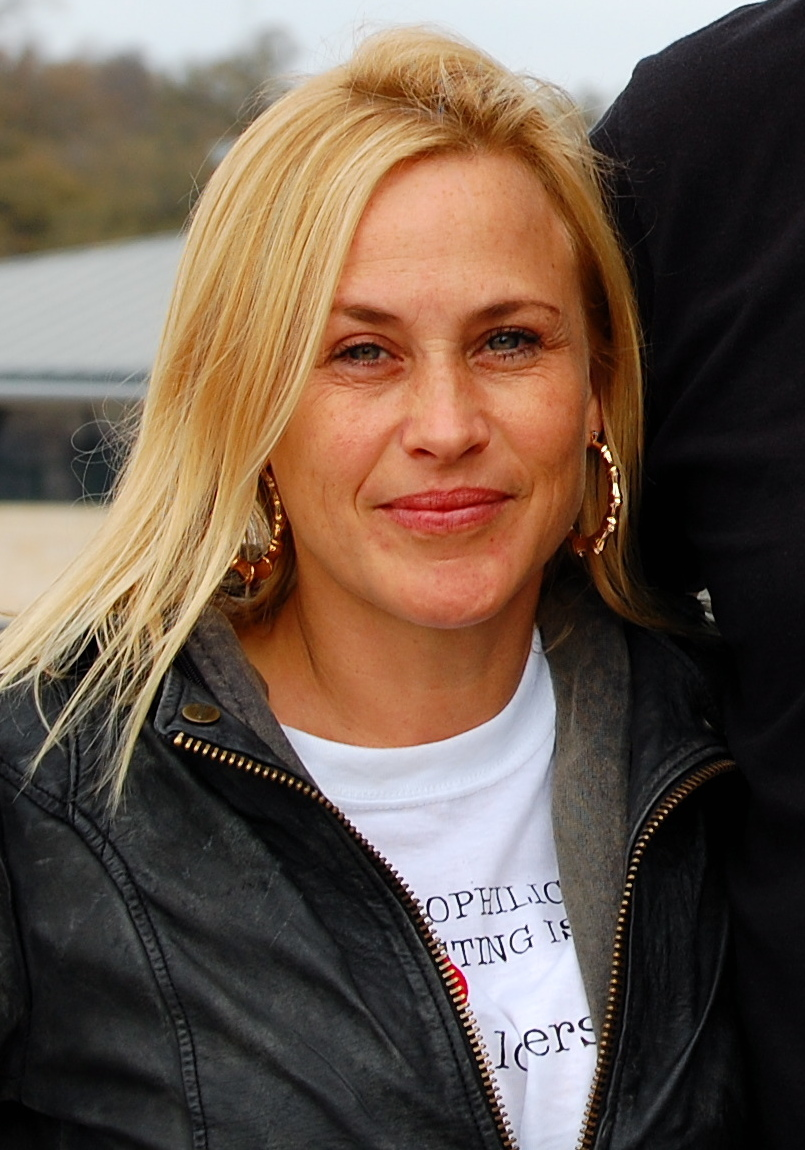
Patricia Arquette, Best Actress in a Miniseries or Television Film winner

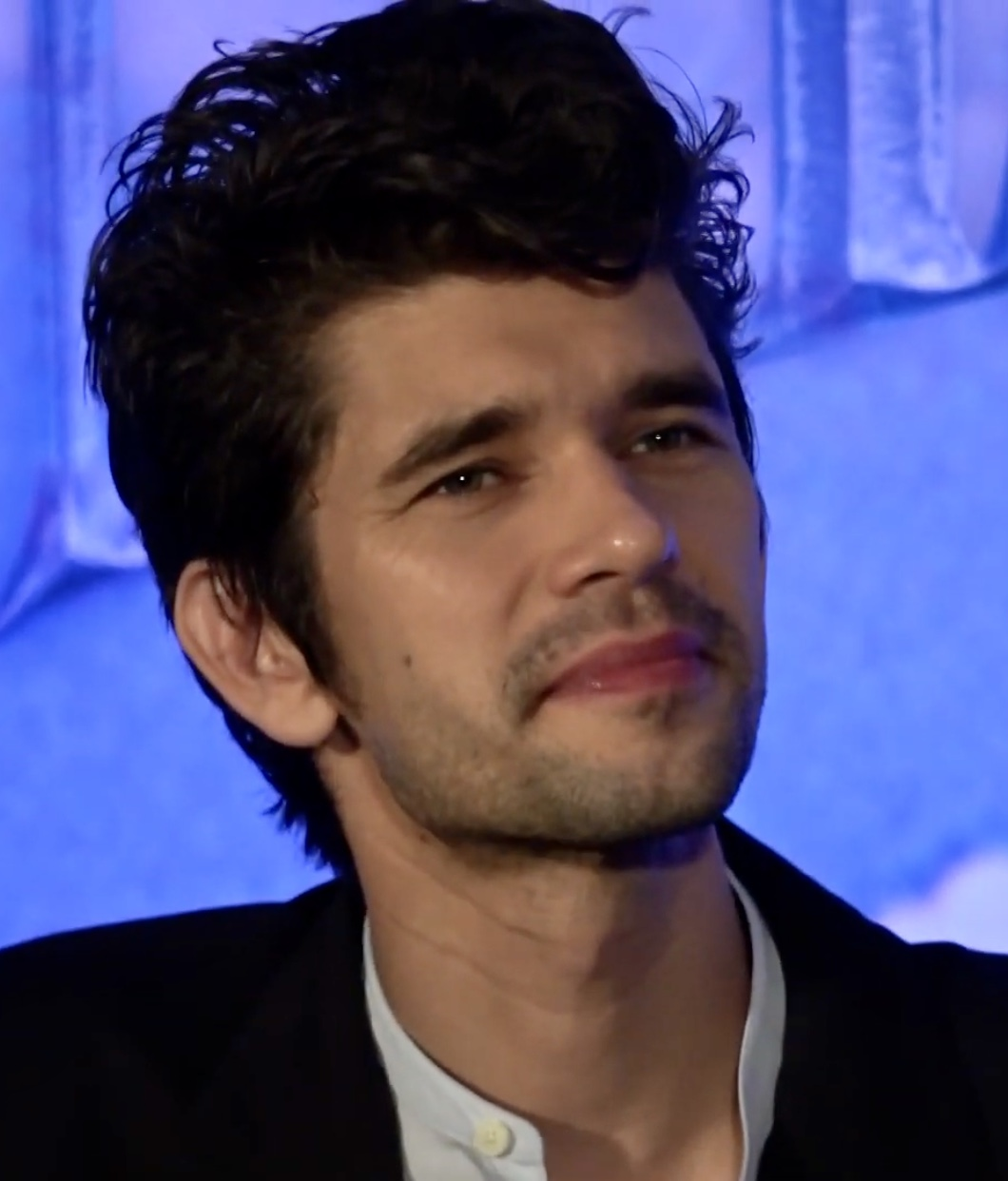
Ben Whishaw, Best Supporting Actor in a Series, Miniseries, or Television Film winner

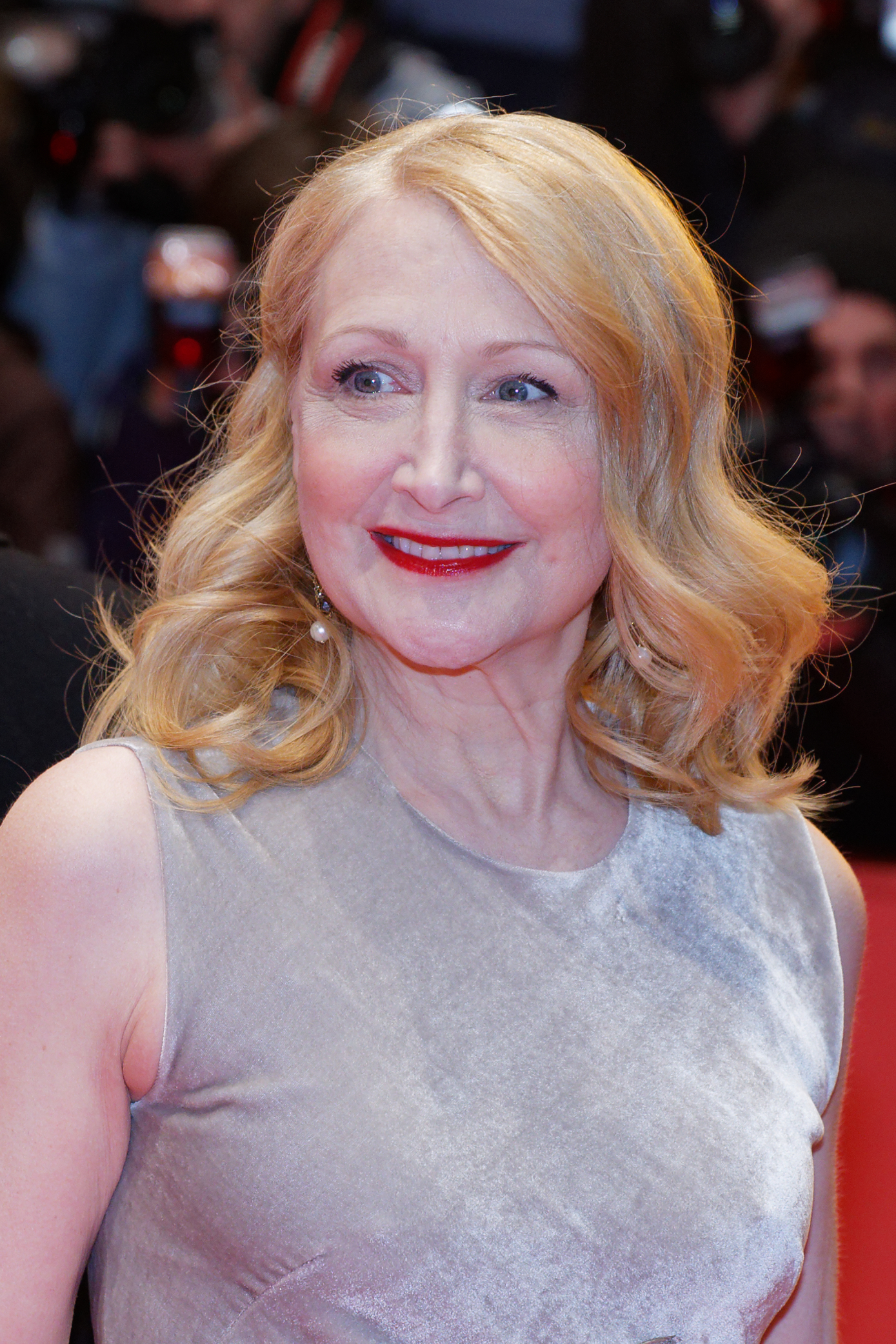
Patricia Clarkson, Best Supporting Actress in a Series, Miniseries, or Television Film winner

=== Film ===
Best Motion Picture
Drama	Musical or Comedy
Bohemian Rhapsody; Black Panther; BlacKkKlansman; If Beale Street Could Talk; A Star Is Born	Green Book; Crazy Rich Asians; The Favourite; Mary Poppins Returns; Vice
Best Performance in a Motion Picture – Drama
Actor	Actress
Rami Malek – Bohemian Rhapsody as Freddie Mercury; Bradley Cooper – A Star Is Born as Jackson Maine; Willem Dafoe – At Eternity's Gate as Vincent van Gogh; Lucas Hedges – Boy Erased as Jared Eamons; John David Washington – BlacKkKlansman as Ron Stallworth	Glenn Close – The Wife as Joan Castleman; Lady Gaga – A Star Is Born as Ally Maine; Nicole Kidman – Destroyer as Erin Bell; Melissa McCarthy – Can You Ever Forgive Me? as Lee Israel; Rosamund Pike – A Private War as Marie Colvin
Best Performance in a Motion Picture – Musical or Comedy
Actor	Actress
Christian Bale – Vice as Dick Cheney; Lin-Manuel Miranda – Mary Poppins Returns as Jack; Viggo Mortensen – Green Book as Frank "Tony Lip" Vallelonga; Robert Redford – The Old Man & the Gun as Forrest Tucker; John C. Reilly – Stan & Ollie as Oliver Hardy	Olivia Colman – The Favourite as Queen Anne; Emily Blunt – Mary Poppins Returns as Mary Poppins; Elsie Fisher – Eighth Grade as Kayla Day; Charlize Theron – Tully as Marlo Moreau; Constance Wu – Crazy Rich Asians as Rachel Chu
Best Supporting Performance in a Motion Picture
Supporting Actor	Supporting Actress
Mahershala Ali – Green Book as Don Shirley; Timothée Chalamet – Beautiful Boy as Nic Sheff; Adam Driver – BlacKkKlansman as Flip Zimmerman; Richard E. Grant – Can You Ever Forgive Me? as Jack Hock; Sam Rockwell – Vice as George W. Bush	Regina King – If Beale Street Could Talk as Sharon Rivers; Amy Adams – Vice as Lynne Cheney; Claire Foy – First Man as Janet Shearon Armstrong; Emma Stone – The Favourite as Abigail Hill; Rachel Weisz – The Favourite as Sarah Churchill
Other
Best Director	Best Screenplay
Alfonso Cuarón – Roma; Bradley Cooper – A Star Is Born; Peter Farrelly – Green Book; Spike Lee – BlacKkKlansman; Adam McKay – Vice	Brian Hayes Currie, Peter Farrelly, and Nick Vallelonga – Green Book; Alfonso Cuarón – Roma; Deborah Davis and Tony McNamara – The Favourite; Barry Jenkins – If Beale Street Could Talk; Adam McKay – Vice
Best Original Score	Best Original Song
Justin Hurwitz – First Man; Marco Beltrami – A Quiet Place; Alexandre Desplat – Isle of Dogs; Ludwig Göransson – Black Panther; Marc Shaiman – Mary Poppins Returns	"Shallow" (Lady Gaga, Mark Ronson, Anthony Rossomando, and Andrew Wyatt) – A Star Is Born; "All the Stars" (Kendrick Lamar, SZA, Sounwave, and Al Shux) – Black Panther; "Girl in the Movies" (Dolly Parton and Linda Perry) – Dumplin'; "Requiem for a Private War" (Annie Lennox) – A Private War; "Revelation" (Jónsi, Troye Sivan, and Leland) – Boy Erased
Best Animated Feature Film	Best Foreign Language Film
Spider-Man: Into the Spider-Verse; Incredibles 2; Isle of Dogs; Mirai; Ralph Breaks the Internet	Roma (Mexico); Capernaum (Lebanon); Girl (Belgium); Never Look Away (Germany); Shoplifters (Japan)

=== Films with multiple nominations ===
The following films received multiple nominations:

Nominations	Films
6	Vice
5	The Favourite
5	Green Book
5	A Star Is Born
4	BlacKkKlansman
4	Mary Poppins Returns
3	Black Panther
3	If Beale Street Could Talk
3	Roma
2	Bohemian Rhapsody
2	Boy Erased
2	Can You Ever Forgive Me?
2	Crazy Rich Asians
2	First Man
2	Isle of Dogs
2	A Private War

=== Films with multiple wins ===
The following films received multiple wins:

Wins	Films
3	Green Book
2	Bohemian Rhapsody
2	Roma

=== Television ===
Best Television Series
Drama	Musical or Comedy
The Americans (FX); Bodyguard (Netflix); Homecoming (Amazon Prime Video); Killing Eve (BBC America); Pose (FX)	The Kominsky Method (Netflix); Barry (HBO); The Good Place (NBC); Kidding (Showtime); The Marvelous Mrs. Maisel (Prime Video)
Best Performance in a Television Series – Drama
Actor	Actress
Richard Madden – Bodyguard (Netflix) as Sergeant David Budd; Jason Bateman – Ozark (Netflix) as Martin "Marty" Byrde; Stephan James – Homecoming (Prime Video) as Walter Cruz; Billy Porter – Pose (FX) as Pray Tell; Matthew Rhys – The Americans (FX) as Philip Jennings	Sandra Oh – Killing Eve as Eve Polastri (BBC America); Caitríona Balfe – Outlander (Starz) as Claire Fraser; Elisabeth Moss – The Handmaid's Tale (Hulu) as June Osborne / Offred; Julia Roberts – Homecoming (Prime Video) as Heidi Bergman; Keri Russell – The Americans (FX) as Elizabeth Jennings
Best Performance in a Television Series – Musical or Comedy
Actor	Actress
Michael Douglas – The Kominsky Method (Netflix) as Sandy Kominsky; Sacha Baron Cohen – Who Is America? (Showtime) as Various Characters; Jim Carrey – Kidding (Showtime) as Jeff Piccirillo; Donald Glover – Atlanta (FX) as Earnest "Earn" Marks / Teddy Perkins; Bill Hader – Barry (HBO) as Barry Berkman / Barry Block	Rachel Brosnahan – The Marvelous Mrs. Maisel (Prime Video) as Miriam "Midge" Maisel; Kristen Bell – The Good Place (NBC) as Eleanor Shellstrop; Candice Bergen – Murphy Brown (CBS) as Murphy Brown; Alison Brie – GLOW (Netflix) as Ruth "Zoya the Destroya" Wilder; Debra Messing – Will & Grace (NBC) as Grace Adler
Best Performance in a Miniseries or Television Film
Actor	Actress
Darren Criss – The Assassination of Gianni Versace: American Crime Story (FX) as Andrew Cunanan; Antonio Banderas – Genius: Picasso (National Geographic) as Pablo Picasso; Daniel Brühl – The Alienist (TNT) as Dr. Laszlo Kreizler; Benedict Cumberbatch – Patrick Melrose (Showtime) as Patrick Melrose; Hugh Grant – A Very English Scandal (Prime Video) as Jeremy Thorpe	Patricia Arquette – Escape at Dannemora (Showtime) as Tilly Mitchell; Amy Adams – Sharp Objects (HBO) as Camille Preaker; Connie Britton – Dirty John (USA Network) as Debra Newell; Laura Dern – The Tale (HBO) as Jennifer Fox; Regina King – Seven Seconds (Netflix) as Latrice Butler
Best Supporting Performance in a Series, Miniseries or Television Film
Supporting Actor	Supporting Actress
Ben Whishaw – A Very English Scandal (Prime Video) as Norman Josiffe; Alan Arkin – The Kominsky Method (Netflix) as Norman Newlander; Kieran Culkin – Succession (HBO) as Roman Roy; Édgar Ramírez – The Assassination of Gianni Versace: American Crime Story (FX) as Gianni Versace; Henry Winkler – Barry (HBO) as Gene Cousineau	Patricia Clarkson – Sharp Objects (HBO) as Adora Crellin; Alex Borstein – The Marvelous Mrs. Maisel (Prime Video) as Susie Myerson; Penélope Cruz – The Assassination of Gianni Versace: American Crime Story (FX) as Donatella Versace; Thandie Newton – Westworld (HBO) as Maeve Millay; Yvonne Strahovski – The Handmaid's Tale (Hulu) as Serena Joy Waterford
Best Miniseries or Television Film
The Assassination of Gianni Versace: American Crime Story (FX); The Alienist (TNT); Escape at Dannemora (Showtime); Sharp Objects (HBO); A Very English Scandal (Prime Video)

=== Series with multiple nominations ===
The following television series received multiple nominations:

Nominations	Series
4	The Assassination of Gianni Versace: American Crime Story
3	The Americans
3	Barry
3	Homecoming
3	The Kominsky Method
3	The Marvelous Mrs. Maisel
3	Sharp Objects
3	A Very English Scandal
2	The Alienist
2	Bodyguard
2	Escape at Dannemora
2	The Good Place
2	The Handmaid's Tale
2	Kidding
2	Killing Eve
2	Pose

=== Series with multiple wins ===
The following two series received multiple wins:

Wins	Series
2	The Assassination of Gianni Versace: American Crime Story
2	The Kominsky Method

=== Cecil B. DeMille Award ===
The Cecil B. DeMille Award is an honorary award bestowed for outstanding contributions to the world of entertainment. It is awarded to honorees who have made a significant mark in the film industry and is named after its first recipient, director Cecil B. DeMille.

- Jeff Bridges

=== Carol Burnett Award ===
The Carol Burnett Award was first awarded at this ceremony and is an honorary award given for outstanding and lasting contributions to television on or off the screen. It is named in honor of its first recipient.

- Carol Burnett

=== Golden Globe Ambassador ===
The Golden Globe Ambassador is a young person, generally a celebrity's daughter or son, who assists in the awards presentations.

- Isan Elba (daughter of Idris Elba)

== Ceremony ==
=== Presenters ===
The following individuals presented awards at the ceremony:

- Bradley Cooper and Lady Gaga with Best Actor – Television Series Musical or Comedy
- Chadwick Boseman, Danai Gurira, Michael B. Jordan, and Lupita Nyong'o with Best Animated Feature Film and introduced Black Panther
- Olivia Colman, Emma Stone, and Rachel Weisz introduced The Favourite
- Kaley Cuoco, Johnny Galecki, and Jim Parsons with Best Actor – Television Series Drama and Best Television Series – Drama
- Adam Driver and John David Washington introduced BlacKkKlansman
- Taraji P. Henson and Gina Rodriguez with Best Supporting Actor – Series, Miniseries or Television Film
- Jamie Lee Curtis and Ben Stiller with Best Actress – Miniseries or Television Film
- Lucy Liu introduced Crazy Rich Asians
- Steve Carell with the Carol Burnett Award
- Idris Elba and Taylor Swift with Best Original Score and Best Original Song
- Octavia Spencer introduced Green Book
- Allison Janney and Sam Rockwell with Best Supporting Actress – Motion Picture
- Kristen Bell and Megan Mullally with Best Actress – Television Series Drama
- Amy Poehler and Maya Rudolph with Best Supporting Actor – Motion Picture and Best Screenplay
- Felicity Huffman and William H. Macy with Best Supporting Actress – Series, Miniseries or Television Film
- Saoirse Ronan with Best Actor – Motion Picture Musical or Comedy
- Antonio Banderas and Catherine Zeta-Jones with Best Foreign Language Film
- Tyler Perry introduced Vice
- Taron Egerton and Amber Heard with Best Actor – Miniseries or Television Film
- Chris Pine with the Cecil B. DeMille Award
- Harrison Ford with Best Director
- Sam Elliott introduced A Star Is Born
- Sterling K. Brown, Justin Hartley, and Chrissy Metz with Best Actress – Television Series Musical or Comedy and Best Television Series – Musical or Comedy
- Emily Blunt and Dick Van Dyke introduced Mary Poppins Returns
- Halle Berry and Lena Waithe with Best Miniseries or Television Film
- Jessica Chastain and Anne Hathaway with Best Actress – Motion Picture Musical or Comedy
- Janelle Monáe introduced If Beale Street Could Talk
- Mike Myers introduced Bohemian Rhapsody
- Bill Murray with Best Motion Picture – Musical or Comedy
- Gary Oldman with Best Actress – Motion Picture Drama
- Richard Gere and Julianne Moore with Best Actor – Motion Picture Drama
- Nicole Kidman with Best Motion Picture – Drama

== Broadcast ==
For the first time, NBC televised the 4:40 p.m. EST Sunday afternoon NFL Wild Card playoff game (which has historically gone to another NFL broadcast partner such as Fox) as a lead-in to the Golden Globes. Because of the large viewership of NFL playoff games, this was expected to boost the Golden Globes' TV ratings, which dropped 11% between 2017 and 2018. Despite the NFL lead-in, the Golden Globes achieved a lower household rating and less total viewers than the 2018 ceremony, though the show experienced a slight increase in the 18–49 demographic.

The regular Golden Globes Red Carpet Preshow was livestreamed exclusively on Facebook Watch instead of airing on NBC.

== In Memoriam ==
No "In Memoriam" section was broadcast on television during the ceremony, so the HFPA included a slideshow on their website, and they included the following names:

- Penny Marshall
- Bernardo Bertolucci
- Stan Lee
- Neil Simon
- Burt Reynolds
- R. Lee Ermey
- Miloš Forman
- Steven Bochco
- Lewis Gilbert
- John Gavin
- John Mahoney

== See also ==
- 91st Academy Awards
- 46th Annie Awards
- 34th Independent Spirit Awards
- 25th Screen Actors Guild Awards
- 24th Critics' Choice Awards
- 23rd Satellite Awards
- 45th Saturn Awards
