= Dyana Winkler =

American director, producer, and writer

- Occupation(s): Director, Writer and producer
- Years active: 2008–present

Dyana Winkler is an American director, producer and writer. She was named one of Variety's 2018 top 10 documentary filmmakers and is best known for her work on the documentary film United Skates.

== Life and career ==
Winkler grew up in Kilauea, Kaua’i. She holds a BA from Mount Holyoke College and an MFA in screenwriting, directing and production, from EICAR in Paris. Her narrative screenplay, Bell, was awarded the 2016 Sundance Sloan Commissioning grant, participated in the 2017 Sundance Screenwriter’s Lab as part of the Alfred P. Sloan Fellowship, and the 2017 SFFILM Cinema Filmmaker Fellowship.

In 2018, Winkler wrote, co-directed and produced the feature documentary, United Skates, Executive Produced by John Legend. It features Salt-N-Pepa, Coolio and Naughty By Nature. The film screened at over 140 film festivals, including its premiere at the Tribeca Film Festival, where it won the Audience Award and was acquired by HBO. In 2020 the film was nominated for an Emmy Award under the category Outstanding Arts and Culture, and took home 14 Audience Choice Awards including, Chicago International Film Festival, New Orleans Film Festival and Vancouver International Film Festival.

== Filmography ==
Year	Film	Writer	Director	Producer
2018	United Skates	✓	✓	✓
