= If Beale Street Could Talk =

1974 novel by James Baldwin

- First edition
- Author: James Baldwin
- Language: English
- Genre: Novel
- Publisher: Dial Press
- Publication date: June 17, 1974
- Publication place: United States
- Media type: Print (hardback)
- Pages: 197
- ISBN: 0-7181-1126-5
- OCLC: 3150118
- Dewey Decimal: 813/.5/4
- LC Class: PZ4.B18 If3 PS3552.A45

If Beale Street Could Talk is a 1974 novel by American writer James Baldwin. His fifth novel (and 13th book overall), it is a love story set in Harlem, New York City, in the early 1970s. The title is a reference to the 1916 W. C. Handy blues song "Beale Street Blues", named after Beale Street in Downtown Memphis, Tennessee.

A film adaptation was released in 2018.

== Summary ==
The novel follows a relationship between a 19-year-old girl named Tish, whose given name is Clementine Rivers, and a 22-year-old sculptor named Fonny, whose given name is Alonzo Hunt. They grew up in the same neighborhood in New York City and are childhood friends. They fall in love and become engaged. The story takes place after Fonny has been accused of raping a woman, and arrested and jailed awaiting his trial. Tish learns that she is pregnant after Fonny is incarcerated and must rely on her and Fonny's family for support.

If Beale Street Could Talk is the first Baldwin novel to focus exclusively on a Black love story; it is also the only novel in his corpus narrated by a woman. Published at the tail end of the Black Arts Movement, it explores love within Black life, centering on the emotional bonds holding two African-American families together.

== Critical reception ==
Reviewing the novel in The New York Times in 1974, the novelist Joyce Carol Oates described If Beale Street Could Talk as "a moving, painful story" but "ultimately optimistic. It stresses the communal bond between members of an oppressed minority, especially between members of a family," offering,

a quite moving and very traditional celebration of love. It affirms not only love between a man and a woman, but love of a type that is dealt with only rarely in contemporary fiction--that between members of a family, which may involve extremes of sacrifice.

Anatole Broyard, also writing for The New York Times, was less sanguine. Deeming the novel a "sentimental love story", he writes,

I get the feeling that Mr. Baldwin doesn't worry overmuch about the authenticity of his books. He knows that, with all his faults, a sizable proportion of the American public will love him still. He is a brand name by now. In fact, he is so dated—I think even Richard Wright is more contemporary—that he might even qualify for our current nostalgia craze. An urbanized "Perils of Pauline," his book could make it equally well as a "gothic" novel, sending thrills of synthetic terror down the spine of that legendary old lady in Dubuque.

In 2015, Stacia L. Brown, writing in Gawker, similarly found Beale Street "belong[ed] to a collection of literature that seeks to humanize black men, through their relationships with parents, lovers, siblings, and children. It swan-dives from optimism to bleakness and rises from the ash of dashed hopes."

When Baldwin spoke to Hugh Hebert of The Guardian upon the release of Beale Street in 1974, he said about his work: "Every poet is an optimist... But on the way to that optimism 'you have to reach a certain level of despair to deal with your life at all.'"
