= Native Son (1951 film) =

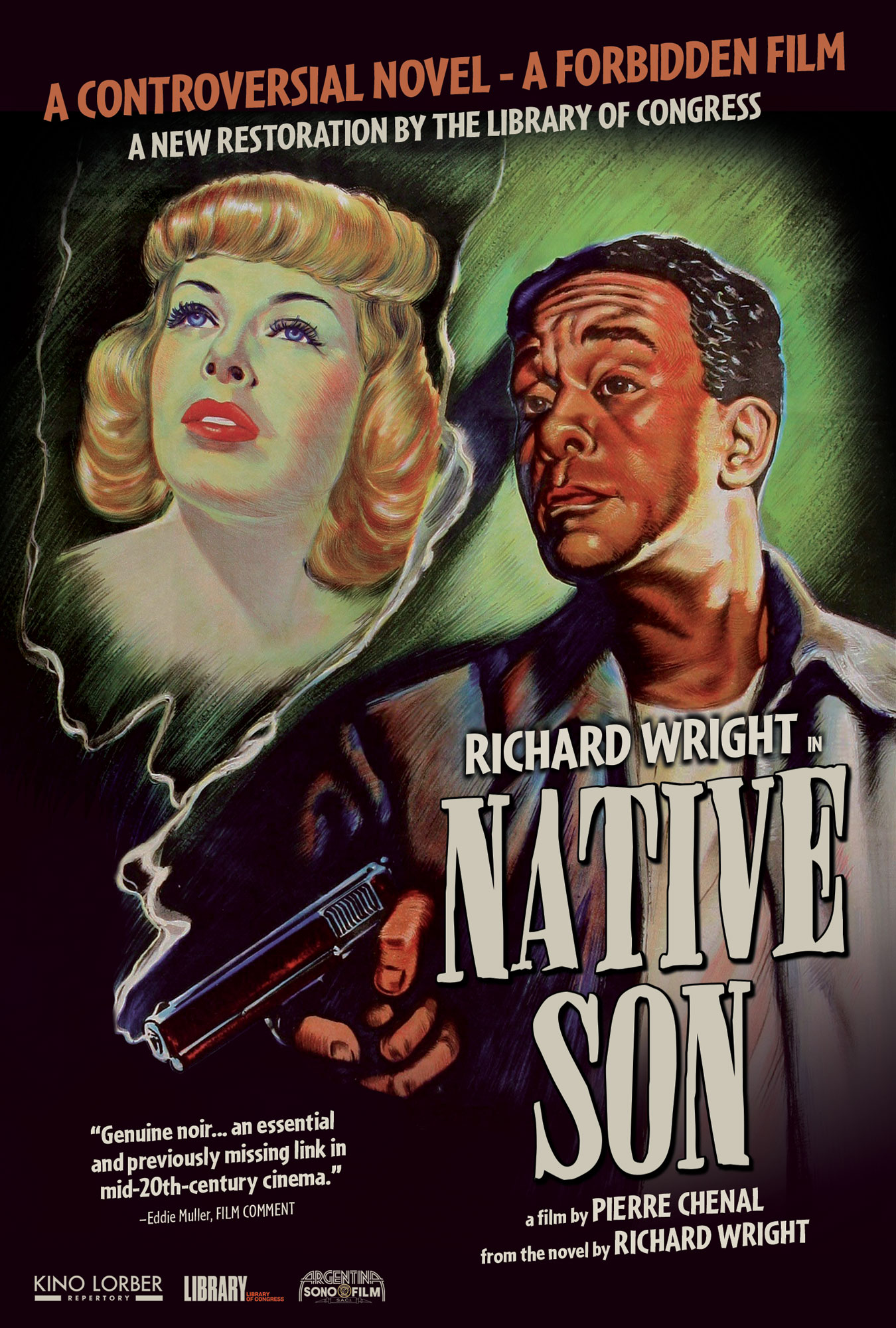
- Artwork for Library of Congress restoration of US-release of this 1951 Argentine film.
- Directed by: Pierre Chenal
- Screenplay by: Richard Wright; Pierre Chenal
- Based on: Native Son; 1940 novel by Richard Wright
- Produced by: Walter Gould; James Prades
- Starring: Richard Wright; Gloria Madison; Willa Pearl Curtis; Jean Wallace; George Rigaud
- Cinematography: A.U. Merayo
- Edited by: George Garate
- Music by: John Elhert
- Production company: Argentina Sono Film
- Distributed by: Argentina Sono Film
- Release date: 1951
- Running time: 104 minutes
- Country: Argentina
- Languages: English; Spanish

Native Son, also known as Sangre negra (in Spanish: "Black Blood"), is a 1951 Argentine melodrama film directed by French filmmaker Pierre Chenal during the classical era of Argentine cinema. It is based on the novel Native Son by American author Richard Wright, who also stars in the film and co-wrote the screenplay with Chenal. Actor Canada Lee, who was originally scheduled to play the film's protagonist Bigger Thomas, had difficulties with his visa while filming Cry, the Beloved Country (1951) in South Africa and had to decline the role; with the whole production in jeopardy due to the mishap, Wright decided to step in and replace Lee.

Due to its controversial plot, the film received severe editing in the United States, which removed about 30 minutes. A restored cut premiered on Turner Classic Movies on February 20, 2021, for the film's 60th anniversary.

Native Son was later remade in two adaptations: one in 1986 and another in 2019.

== Plot summary ==
A young black man, Bigger Thomas, is hired as a chauffeur for a progressive, affluent white family living in Chicago in the early 1940s. That evening, he drives their teenage daughter Mary into town to meet left-wing sympathizers. Their attempts to befriend Bigger are baffling to him because no white person has ever been kind to him and reflect how oblivious they are to the reactions of the black man.

Mary gets so drunk with her boyfriend, Jan, that she passes out. Bigger takes Mary home and carries her to bed. Mary makes advances to Bigger so he kisses her. Mrs. Dalton, who is blind, suddenly opens Mary's door. Bigger panics and covers her mouth with a pillow. Mary cannot breathe, and he accidentally smothers her to death. Mrs. Dalton merely thinks that Mary has passed out from being drunk and leaves the room. Bigger moves the body and puts her in the basement furnace, trying to cover up what happened.

A group of reporters, relegated to the furnace room of the house, notice fragments of bone and an earring in the ashes, prompting Bigger to flee in terror. He joins his girlfriend Bessie, a nightclub singer, in an abandoned building, but when she goes to a drug store for liquor and a sweater for him, Bigger thinks she has conspired with stool pigeon Snippy to put the police onto him, and he murders her, throwing her body into an elevator shaft. He flees the building, but the police give chase, turning a hose on him and forcing his surrender.

He is defended by a leftist lawyer with support from Jan, who worked with Mary toward racial equality. Max, the lawyer, fails to overcome the racism of the judge and jury and Bigger is sentenced to death. When Max tearfully says goodbye to Bigger for the last time, Bigger asks him to "say hello to Mr... to Jan". Bigger had found two white people capable of kindness to him; all the others put him to death.

== Cast ==
- Richard Wright ... Bigger Thomas
- Willa Pearl Curtis ... Mrs. Hannah Thomas
- Gloria Madison ... Bessie Mears
- Lidia Alves ... Vera Thomas
- Leslie Straugh ... Buddy Thomas
- Nicholas Joy ... Henry Dalton
- Ruth Robert ... Helen Dalton
- Jean Wallace ... Mary Dalton
- Charles Cane ... Detective Britten
- George D. Green ... Panama
- George Rigaud ... Farley, a reporter
- Charles Simmonds ... Ernie

== Film noir style ==
Principles of the film had a close relationship to film noir. Richard Wright was a particular fan of film noir, and director Chenal was a pioneer in the style. He was the first to make a film treatment of the novel The Postman Always Rings Twice, and there are many parallels between Native Son and that film noir classic. Regarding the movie's status as a film noir, writers have noted its similarities to this style, stating it has "noir touches" and "the unmistakable feel of noir", and that it "does justice to the noir style." Other writers have gone further, stating it is "good noir" or "darkly satiric noir", and "genuine noir." One writer expounded "indeed it is [film noir] ... Not only in terms of the visual style but in terms of moral ambiguity."

== Production ==
=== Casting ===
While Bigger is 20 years old in the novel, he is about 25 in this version.

Americans were the primary actors while Latin Americans and Argentines of African descent had smaller roles.

=== Development ===
The history of this movie started with the Broadway version of Richard Wright's novel Native Son, produced by Orson Welles. Welles worked with playwright Paul Green and Richard Wright himself on the adaptation. MGM offered Wright $25,000 for the film rights to the novel, but they insisted the movie be cast with white actors exclusively. The independent producer Harold Hecht proposed to make the film, but wanted Bigger to be a white man of an oppressed ethnic background rather than a black man. Wright declined both.

Wright ultimately agreed to a proposal by French director Pierre Chenal to film his version. Chenal's film was greatly influenced by Welles' version and took it as its starting point.

France and Italy were approached for location, but both countries refused to grant the requisite permits; they were recipients of US economic aid from the Marshall Plan and were afraid of repercussions if they hosted such an incendiary film. Wright and Chanal then turned to Argentina, where Chanal had already shot several pictures after fleeing from the Nazis in France. Funding for the film came from Argentina's government, which had raised the money by taxing the box office receipts of Hollywood movies shown there.

Shechtman wrote that the process of making Buenos Aires look like Chicago occurred "without too much difficulty". The slums there substituted easily for the slums of Chicago, and Wright was meticulous about recreating Chicago visually, insisting that storefronts and brand names recreated on set be authentic.

Wright played Bigger because his first choice, Canada Lee, who had portrayed the character in the Broadway play, was not able to do so. Many other actors would not consider the role because they were fearful of repercussions; Wright was blacklisted in Hollywood at the time for membership in the communist party. The role of Mary required the white actress to touch a black man, so multiple actresses were unwilling to take the role. Hollywood actress Jean Wallace accepted the female lead, possibly because her career had stalled due to personal problems.

American studios refused to release the film, but independent distributor Classic Pictures picked it up after extensive editing. About 30 minutes of film had been excised as per the direction of the New York Board of Censors.

== Release and later restoration ==
Despite a heavy editing, multiple U.S. states made it illegal to show the new cut of the film.

The Library of Congress undertook a restoration, with consultation by Edgardo Krebs of the Smithsonian Institution. In 2012, an in-progress version of the restoration aired at the New York Film Festival. The fully restored uncut film, stitched together from a complete 16MM Argentine print and an incomplete 35MM print in the Archivo General de Puerto Rico intended for non-United States markets, premiered in the United States at the Museum of Modern Art in 2016.

== Reception ==
Shechtman wrote that, in regards to the initial U.S. distribution, "Reviewers and theatre owners were encouraged to receive it as tawdry entertainment, and most did." Chenal stated "We presented a perfectly massacred version of the film and they have the right to review it." A review in an African American newspaper described the edited film as being similar to The Birth of a Nation; the review stated that the film was "leaving the audience with no choice but to condemn" Bigger due to omission of key characteristics.

The 1951 review in The New York Times described the film as "a sincere but strangely unconvincing film". The reviewer added "The stature of Native Son has been reduced with this exposure of film". That same review described many of the actors as also being "amateurish".

Media studies professor Thy Phu stated that the film was "a commercial and critical disaster". Film historian Aljean Harmetz wrote in The New York Times that the 1951 film was "criticized as amateurish and melodramatic".

Film journalist Anna Shechtman wrote in The New Yorker that the "amateurism" in the portrayal of Bigger by Wright "almost works" due to the "slow and stilted" voice "as though he's speaking to people in a language they don't know—which, partly, he was." Film critic J. Hoberman in The New York Times argued that the attempt to age Bigger in the film does not help the portrayal and that "Although Wright's delivery is forceful and his looks camera-friendly, he can't avoid seeming inauthentic in a T-shirt and baseball cap, playing a man half his age." In 2019 Todd McCarthy of The Hollywood Reporter wrote that the film "possessed all the elements of a fiasco, and it was."

Regarding the restored version, Chris Vogner of the Houston Chronicle stated "Even if it's not a great film, the "Native Son" is of historical and cultural significance".

Julia Wright, the daughter of Richard Wright, stated that both she and her father did not like the 1951 film in regards to its quality as a film; in regards to the former she cited how there was relatively little content about Bigger's criminal trial. Julia Wright argued the film was a valuable as a "wonderful document of Richard Wright on live film."

== See also ==
- Stein, Sadie (2013-07-15). "Watch Richard Wright Act in Native Son". The Paris Review. Richard Wright's screen test for the film
