= 19th Annual Black Reel Awards =

Film-industry awards in 2019

19th Black Reel Awards
- Date: February 7, 2019
- Location: Washington, D.C.

Highlights
- Most wins: Black Panther (10)
- Most nominations: Black Panther (17)
- Outstanding film: Black Panther

3rd Annual Black Reel Awards for Television
- Date: August 1, 2019
- Location: Washington, D.C.
- Most wins: When They See Us (7)
- Most nominations: When They See Us (17)

The 19th Annual Black Reel Awards ceremony, presented by the Foundation for the Augmentation of African-Americans in Film (FAAAF) and honoring the best films of 2018, took place on February 7, 2019, at 8:00 p.m. EST (5:00 p.m. PST). During the ceremony, the FAAAF presented Black Reel Awards in 23 motion picture categories. The ceremony marked the first year that achievements in costume design, cinematography and production design were recognized by the voting body.

Black Panther led the nominations with a record-breaking eighteen nominations and went on to win ten awards, including Outstanding Film. Other major nominees included If Beale Street Could Talk and BlacKkKlansman, with fourteen and eleven nominations respectively.

The 3rd Annual Black Reel Awards for Television, honoring the best in television from June 1, 2018, to May 31, 2019, took place on August 1, 2019, at 8:00 p.m. EST (5:00 p.m. PST). Netflix's When They See Us led the nominations with a record-breaking seventeen nominations and went on to win seven awards, including Outstanding TV Movie or Limited Series. HBO's Insecure and NBC's This Is Us additionally took home the awards for Outstanding Comedy and Drama Series, respectively.

== Black Reel Awards Film Winners and nominees ==
Winners are highlighted in bold.

Best Film	Best Director
**Black Panther**; BlacKkKlansman; Green Book; If Beale Street Could Talk; Widows	**Ryan Coogler – Black Panther**; Spike Lee – BlacKkKlansman; Barry Jenkins – If Beale Street Could Talk; Boots Riley – Sorry to Bother You; Steve McQueen – Widows
Best Actor	Best Actress
**Chadwick Boseman – Black Panther**; Michael B. Jordan – Creed II; John David Washington – BlacKkKlansman; Keith Stanfield –Sorry to Bother You; Stephan James – If Beale Street Could Talk	**KiKi Layne – If Beale Street Could Talk**; Viola Davis– Widows; Zoe Renee – Jinn; Amandla Stenberg – The Hate U Give; Regina Hall – Support the Girls
Best Supporting Actor	Best Supporting Actress
**Michael B. Jordan – Black Panther**; Russell Hornsby – The Hate U Give; Daniel Kaluuya – Widows; Mahershala Ali – Green Book; Brian Tyree Henry – If Beale Street Could Talk	**Regina King – If Beale Street Could Talk**; Letitia Wright – Black Panther; Danai Gurira – Black Panther; Lupita Nyong'o – Black Panther; Simone Missick – Jinn
Best Breakthrough Performance, Male	Best Breakthrough Performance, Female
**Winston Duke – Black Panther**; John David Washington – BlacKkKlansman; Donald Glover – Solo: A Star Wars Story; Brian Tyree Henry – If Beale Street Could Talk; Daveed Diggs – Blindspotting	**Letitia Wright – Black Panther**; Cynthia Erivo – Bad Times at the El Royale; Laura Harrier – BlacKkKlansman; KiKi Layne – If Beale Street Could Talk; Zoe Renee – Jinn
Best Ensemble	Best Screenplay, Adapted or Original
**Sarah Finn – Black Panther**; Cindy Tolan – Sorry to Bother You; Cindy Tolan – If Beale Street Could Talk; Francine Maisler, Mickie Paskal & Jennifer Rudnicke – Widows; Kim Coleman – BlacKkKlansman	**Boots Riley – Sorry to Bother You**; Steve McQueen & Gillian Flynn – Widows; Spike Lee, Kevin Willmott, Charlie Wachtel and David Rabinowitz – BlacKkKlansman; Ryan Coogler and Joe Robert Cole – Black Panther; Barry Jenkins – If Beale Street Could Talk
Outstanding Feature Documentary	Outstanding Independent Feature
**Quincy – Alan Hicks & Rashida Jones**; Whitney – Kevin Macdonald; Hale County This Morning, This Evening – RaMell Ross; Minding the Gap –Bing Liu; Amazing Grace – Sydney Pollack	**Jinn – Nijla Mumin**; A Boy. A Girl. A Dream. – Qasim Basir; Roxanne Roxanne – Michael Larnell; Monsters and Men – Reinaldo Marcus Green; Yardie – Idris Elba
Outstanding Short Film	Outstanding Independent Documentary
**The Tale of Four – Gabourey Sidibe**; Jump – Kofi Siriboe; WTFIMH: What the Fuck is Mental Health – Kofi Siriboe; Hair Wolf – Mariama Diallo; Funk Force – Desmond Levi Jackson	**Sammy Davis Jr.: I’ve Gotta Be Me – Samuel D. Pollard**; Basquiat: Rage to Riches – David Schulman; Lorraine Hansberry: Sighted Eyes/Feeling Heart – Tracey Heather Strain
Outstanding Foreign Film/ World Cinema Motion Picture	Outstanding Voice Performance
**Lionheart (Nigeria) – Genevieve Nnaji**; Green Days by the River (Trinidad and Tobago) – Michael Mooleedhar; Where Hands Touch (United Kingdom) – Amma Asante; Vaya (South Africa) – Akin Omotoso; Rafiki (Kenya) – Wanuri Kahiu	**Shameik Moore – Spider-Man: Into the Spider-Verse**; Taraji P. Henson – Ralph Breaks the Internet; Samuel L. Jackson – Incredibles 2; Mahershala Ali – Spider-Man: Into the Spider-Verse; Brian Tyree Henry – Spider-Man: Into the Spider-Verse
Best Emerging Filmmaker	Best First Screenplay
**Boots Riley – Sorry to Bother You**; Idris Elba – Yardie; Rashida Jones – Quincy; Nijla Mumin – Jinn; Reinaldo Marcus Green – Monsters and Men	**Boots Riley – Sorry to Bother You**; Daveed Diggs & Rafael Casal – Blindspotting; Reinaldo Marcus Green – Monsters and Men; Michael Larnell – Roxanne Roxanne; Nijla Mumin – Jinn
Best Original or Adapted Song	Outstanding Original Score
**"All the Stars" from Black Panther – Kendrick Lamar & SZA**; "We Won’t Move" from The Hate U Give – Arlissa; "Love Lies (song)" from Love, Simon – Khalid & Normani; "Pray for Me (The Weeknd and Kendrick Lamar song)" from Black Panther – The Weeknd and Kendrick Lamar; "I’ll Fight" from RBG (film) – Jennifer Hudson	**Nicholas Britell – If Beale Street Could Talk**; Terence Blanchard – BlacKkKlansman; Ludwig Göransson – Creed II; Ludwig Göransson – Black Panther; Dustin O’Halloran – The Hate U Give
Outstanding Cinematography	Outstanding Costume Design
**James Laxton – If Beale Street Could Talk**; Chayse Irvin– BlacKkKlansman; Tobias A. Schliessler – A Wrinkle in Time; Rachel Morrison – Black Panther; Sean Bobbitt – Widows	**Ruth E. Carter – Black Panther**; Marci Rodgers– BlacKkKlansman; Caroline Eselin – If Beale Street Could Talk; Deirdra Elizabeth Green – Sorry to Bother You; Paco Delgado – A Wrinkle in Time
Outstanding Production Design
**Hannah Beachler – Black Panther**; Marci Mudd – BlacKkKlansman; Mark Friedberg – If Beale Street Could Talk; Naomi Shohan – A Wrinkle in Time; Tim Galvin – Green Book

== Summary of Film Awards and Nominations ==
List of films with multiple nominations

Film	Wins	Nominations	Outstanding Film Nominee/Winner
Black Panther	10	17	Winner
If Beale Street Could Talk	4	14	Nominee
BlacKkKlansman	0	11	Nominee
Widows	0	7	Nominee
Sorry to Bother You	3	7	
Jinn	1	6	
The Hate U Give	0	4	
Spider-Man: Into the Spider-Verse	1	3	
Monsters and Men	0	3	
Green Book	0	3	Nominee
A Wrinkle in Time	0	3	
Yardie	0	3	
Roxanne Roxanne	0	2	
Quincy (film)	1	2	
Creed II	0	2	
Blindspotting	0	2	

== Black Reel Awards for Television Winners and nominees ==
Winners are highlighted in bold.

Outstanding Drama Series	Outstanding Actor, Drama Series
**This Is Us**; Pose; Claws; Black Lightning; All American	**Billy Porter – Pose**; Sterling K. Brown – This Is Us; Brandon Micheal Hall – God Friended Me; Damson Idris – Snowfall; Kofi Siriboe – Queen Sugar
Outstanding Actress, Drama Series	Outstanding Supporting Actor, Drama Series
**Rutina Wesley – Queen Sugar**; Dawn-Lyen Gardner – Queen Sugar; Niecy Nash – Claws; Angela Bassett –9-1-1 (TV series); Alfre Woodard – Luke Cage	**Joe Morton – God Friended Me**; Nicholas L. Ashe – Queen Sugar; Orlando Jones – American Gods; Giancarlo Esposito – Better Call Saul; Mustafa Shakir – Luke Cage
Outstanding Supporting Actress, Drama Series	Outstanding Directing, Drama Series
**Susan Kelechi Watson – This Is Us**; Tina Lifford – Queen Sugar; Lynn Whitfield – Greenleaf; Karimah Westbrook – All American; Indya Moore – Pose	**"Don't Take My Sunshine Away" from This Is Us - George Tillman Jr. (director)**; "The Book of Apocalypse: Chapter Two: The Omega" from Black Lightning – Salim Akil **(director)**; "A Rock, A River, A Tree" from Queen Sugar – DeMane Davis **(director)**; "Love is the Message" from Pose – Janet Mock **(director)**; "R&B" from This Is Us – Kevin Hooks **(director)**
Outstanding Writing, Drama Series	Outstanding Guest Actor, Drama Series
**"Our Little Island Girl" from This Is Us - Eboni Freeman (writer)**; "Scream" from Claws – Maisha Closson **(writer)**; "Unfriended" from God Friended Me – Safia M. Dirie **(writer)**; "Love is the Message" from Pose – Janet Mock & Ryan Murphy **(writers)**; "R&B" from This Is Us – Kay Oyegun **(writer)**	**Rob Morgan – This Is Us**; Carl Lumbly – This Is Us; Mahershala Ali – Room 104; Ron Cephas Jones – Luke Cage; Common – The Chi
Outstanding Guest Actress, Drama Series	Outstanding Comedy Series
**Phylicia Rashad – This Is Us**; Erika Alexander – Black Lightning; Rutina Wesley – The Walking Dead; Marla Gibbs – NCIS; Cicely Tyson – How to Get Away With Murder	**Insecure**; Black-ish; Grown-ish; On My Block; She's Gotta Have It
Outstanding Actor, Comedy Series	Outstanding Actress, Comedy Series
**Don Cheadle – Black Monday**; Anthony Anderson – Black-ish; Tracy Morgan – The Last O.G.; Idris Elba –Turn Up Charlie; Keegan-Michael Key – Friends from College	**Issa Rae – Insecure**; Tracee Ellis Ross – Black-ish; Tiffany Haddish – The Last O.G.; DeWanda Wise – She's Gotta Have It; Regina Hall – Black Monday
Outstanding Supporting Actor, Comedy Series	Outstanding Supporting Actress, Comedy Series
**Tituss Burgess – Unbreakable Kimmy Schmidt**; Kenan Thompson – Saturday Night Live; Laurence Fishburne – Black-ish; Jay Ellis – Insecure; Anthony Ramos – She's Gotta Have It	**Jenifer Lewis – Black-ish**; Leslie Jones – Saturday Night Live; Yvonne Orji – Insecure; Natasha Rothwell - Insecure; Marsai Martin - Black-ish
Outstanding Directing, Comedy Series	Outstanding Writing, Comedy Series
**"Black Like Us" from Black-ish - Salli Richardson (director)**; "High-Like" from Insecure – Millicent Shelton **(director)**; "Ghost-Like" from Insecure – Regina King **(director)**; "Purple Rain" from Black-ish – Charles Stone III **(director)**; "Black History Month" from Black-ish – Tracee Ellis Ross **(director)**	**"Black Like Us" from Black-ish - Peter Saji (writer)**; "Relatively Grown Man" from Black-ish – Steven White **(writer)**; "Ghost-Like" from Insecure – Issa Rae & Natasha Rothwell **(writers)**; "Obsessed-Like" from Insecure – Prentice Penny **(writer)**; "#NationTime" from She's Gotta Have It – Radha Blank **(writer)**
Outstanding Guest Actor, Comedy Series	Outstanding Guest Actress, Comedy Series
**Katt Williams – Black-ish**; Idris Elba – Saturday Night Live; Ernie Hudson – Ballers; Kenan Thompson – Unbreakable Kimmy Schmidt; RuPaul – Grace and Frankie	**Anna Deavere Smith – Black-ish**; Rosie Perez – She's Gotta Have It; Marla Gibbs – Rel; Maya Rudolph – The Good Place; Regina King – The Big Bang Theory
Outstanding TV Movie or Limited Series	Outstanding Actor, TV Movie or Limited Series
**When They See Us**; Native Son; "The Bobby Brown Story"; Luther; True Detective	**Jharrel Jerome – When They See Us**; Ashton Sanders – Native Son; Mahershala Ali – True Detective; Woody McClain – "The Bobby Brown Story"; Idris Elba – Luther
Outstanding Actress, TV Movie/Limited Series	Outstanding Supporting Actor, TV Movie/Limited Series
**Niecy Nash – When They See Us**; Aunjanue Ellis – When They See Us; Michaela Coel – Black Earth Rising; Emayatzy Corinealdi – The Red Line; Alfre Woodard – Juanita	**Michael K. Williams – When They See Us**; Asante Blackk – When They See Us; Caleel Harris – When They See Us; Marquis Rodriguez – When They See Us; Michael Ealy – "Being Mary Jane: Becoming Pauletta"
Outstanding Supporting Actress, TV Movie/Limited Series	Outstanding Directing, TV Movie/Limited Series
**Marsha Stephanie Blake – When They See Us**; Kylie Bunbury – When They See Us; Isis King – When They See Us; Carmen Ejogo – True Detective; Marla Gibbs – Live in Front of a Studio Audience: Norman Lear's All in the Family and The Jeffersons	**When They See Us - Ava DuVernay (director)**; Juanita – Clark Johnson **(director)**; Native Son – Rashid Johnson **(director)**; "We All Must Care" from The Red Line – Victoria Mahoney **(director)**; "The Bobby Brown Story" – Kiel Adrian Scott **(director)**
Outstanding Writing, TV Movie/Limited Series	Outstanding TV Special or Documentary
**"Part 1" from When They See Us - Ava DuVernay, Julian Breece & Attica Locke (writers)**; "Part 2" from When They See Us – Ava DuVernay, Julian Breece & Attica Locke**(writers)**; "Part 3" from When They See Us – Ava DuVernay & Robin Swicord**(writers)**; "Part 4" from When They See Us – Ava DuVernay & Michael Starrbury**(writers)**; "The Bobby Brown Story" – Abdul Williams**(writer)**	**Surviving R. Kelly**; Wu-Tang Clan: Of Mics and Men; HΘMΣCΘMING; Say Her Name: The Life and Death of Sandra Bland; Rest in Power: The Trayvon Martin Story
Outstanding Music (Comedy, Drama or Limited Series)
**Pose**; Insecure; When They See Us; Greenleaf; Empire

== Summary of Television Awards and Nominations ==
Series with multiple nominations

Film	Wins	Nominations	Outstanding Series Nominee/Winner
When They See Us	7	17	Winner (Outstanding TV Movie/Limited Series)
Black-ish	5	13	Nominee (Outstanding Comedy Series)
This Is Us	6	10	Winner (Outstanding Drama Series)
Insecure	2	10	Winner (Outstanding Comedy Series)
Queen Sugar	1	6	
Pose	2	6	Nominee (Outstanding Drama Series)
She's Gotta Have It	0	5	Nominee (Outstanding Comedy Series)
"The Bobby Brown Story"	0	4	Nominee (Outstanding TV Movie/Limited Series)
Native Son	0	3	Nominee (Outstanding TV Movie/Limited Series)
Saturday Night Live	0	3	
True Detective	0	3	Nominee (Outstanding TV Movie/Limited Series)
God Friended Me	1	3	
Luke Cage	0	3	
Claws	0	3	Nominee (Outstanding Drama Series)
Black Lightning	0	3	Nominee (Outstanding Drama Series)
Juanita	0	2	
The Last O.G.	0	2	
The Red Line	0	2	
Unbreakable Kimmy Schmidt	1	2	
Luther	0	2	Nominee (Outstanding TV Movie/Limited Series)
Greenleaf	0	2	
All American	0	2	Nominee (Outstanding Drama Series)
Black Monday	1	2	
