= Victor Love =

American actor (born 1957)

- Born: Victor Love; August 4, 1957 (age 69); Camp Lejeune, North Carolina, U.S.
- Occupation: Actor
- Years active: 1986–present

Victor Love is an American actor, best known for the role of Bigger Thomas in the 1986 movie adaptation of the Richard Wright novel Native Son, for which he was nominated the Independent Spirit Award for Best Male Lead.

== Filmography ==
=== Film ===
- Native Son (1986, as Bigger Thomas)
- Heaven Is a Playground (1991, as Truth Harrison)
- It's My Party (1996, as Matt Paulson)
- A Gun, a Car, a Blonde (1997, as Bobby/The Black Chinaman)
- Gang Related (1997, as Hooper)
- Shadow of Doubt (1998, as Detective Baker)
- Time to Pay (1999, as Del Farborough)
- Velocity Trap (1999, as Fallout, Endeavor Crew)
- Our Father (2004, short film, as Johnny)
- Ace High (2012, short film, as Inspector Diamond)
- Red All Over (2016, as Clay Wright)

=== Television ===
- Miami Vice (1986, 1 episode, as Clarence Batisse)
- Guilty of Innocence: The Lenell Geter Story (1987, TV movie, as Anthony Williams)
- It's a Living (1987, 1 episode, as Robert)
- The Return of Desperado (1988, TV movie, as Nathaniel Pickett)
- Spenser: For Hire (1988, 1 episode, as Darnell Lewis)
- The Days and Nights of Molly Dodd (1990, 1 episode, as Thelonius the President)
- L.A. Law (1991, 1 episode, as Larry Edwards)
- Great Performances (1991, 1 episode, as The Guy)
- Shannon's Deal (1991, 2 episodes, as Griggs)
- Sibs (1991, 1 episode, as Marvin Shaw)
- A Different World (1992, 1 episode, as Lionel Walker)
- Final Shot: The Hank Gathers Story (1992, TV movie, as Hank Gathers)
- Melrose Place (1992, pilot episode, as Daniel)
- Time Trax (1993, 1 episode, as Mikk Davis)
- For Love and Glory (1993, TV movie, as Peyton)
- Mighty Max (1994, 1 episode)
- Tom Clancy's OP Center (1995, TV movie, as Captain Ted Drake)
- The Watcher (1995, 1 episode)
- The Cartoon Cartoon Show (1995, 1 episode - "Yuckie Duck: Short Orders", as Restaurant Manager)
- The Marshal (1995, 1 episode, as Rainbow Brown)
- Courthouse (1995, 1 episode, as Michael T. Lennox)
- Jonny Quest Versus the Cyber Insects (1995, TV movie, as Commander Harris)
- The Assassination File (1996, TV movie, as Anthony Laskey)
- JAG (1997, 1 episode, as Corporal Jason Magida)
- The Sleepwalker Killing (1997, TV movie, as Det. Ike Nolan)
- Spawn (1997–1998, 12 episodes, as Terry Fitzgerald / Bobby, episodes 1–12)
- Babylon 5 (1998, 2 episodes, as Telepath)
- L.A. Doctors (1999, 1 episode)
- Pacific Blue (1999, 1 episode)
- The West Wing (1999–2000, 4 episodes, as Mike)
- Any Day Now (1999-2002, 4 episodes, as Elston Jackson)
- Seven Days (2001, 1 episode, as Dr. Reginald Carter)
- 7th Heaven (2005, 1 episode, as Rusell Miles)
- Red Band Society (2014–2015, 2 episodes, as Dr. King)
- The Resident (2019, 1 episode, as Dr. Carleton Ward)

=== Video games ===
- Mr. Payback: An Interactive Movie (1995, as Lloyd Braxton)
- Of Light and Darkness (1998 as Brother War and MotorMouth)
