= Captive State (disambiguation) =

Captive State is a 2019 science fiction film.

Captive State may also refer to:

- Captive State: The Corporate Takeover of Britain, a book by George Monbiot published in 2000
- Captivity, a state wherein animals are confined and prevented from moving freely
