= Native Son (2019 film) =

2019 film directed by Rashid Johnson

- Official poster
- Directed by: Rashid Johnson
- Screenplay by: Suzan-Lori Parks
- Based on: Native Son by Richard Wright
- Produced by: Matthew Perniciaro; Michael Sherman
- Starring: Ashton Sanders; Margaret Qualley; Nick Robinson; KiKi Layne; Bill Camp; Sanaa Lathan
- Cinematography: Matthew Libatique
- Edited by: Brad Turner
- Music by: Kyle Dixon; Michael Stein
- Production companies: A24; Bow + Arrow Entertainment
- Distributed by: HBO Films
- Release dates: January 24, 2019 (Sundance); April 6, 2019 (United States)
- Running time: 104 minutes
- Country: United States
- Language: English

Native Son is a 2019 American drama film directed by Rashid Johnson from a screenplay by Suzan-Lori Parks. It is based on the novel of the same name by Richard Wright. The film stars Ashton Sanders, Margaret Qualley, Nick Robinson, KiKi Layne, Bill Camp and Sanaa Lathan.

Native Son had its world premiere at the Sundance Film Festival on January 24, 2019, and was released in the United States on April 6, 2019, by HBO Films.

== Plot ==
Bigger Thomas is a young African-American man living with his family in Chicago. One day, Bigger receives an opportunity to interview for a job as the live-in chauffeur for the wealthy businessman Henry Dalton and his family. Bigger's friend Jack wants Bigger to participate in a robbery with him instead, but Bigger's girlfriend Bessie convinces him to take the interview. The interview with Mr. Dalton goes successfully, and Bigger is introduced to Mrs. Dalton and Mary, Mr. Dalton's radical daughter.

That night, Bigger drives Mary to a political meeting led by her boyfriend, Jan Erlone. Afterward, Jan and Mary take Bigger out to a local club that Bigger frequents, and the three become friends. As Bigger grows closer to Jan and Mary, he has a falling out with Jack. Bigger failed to show up for the robbery he promised he would participate in, leaving Jack to abandon it. Jack accuses Bigger of succumbing to the stereotypes he himself had shown disdain for. After attending an orchestra with Mary and Jan, Bigger retreats to his room to find an expensive album he had wished to purchase gifted to him by Mary. In thanks, Bigger obtains drugs for Mary and Jan to take at a party.

At the party, Mary and Jan get into an argument after Jan discovers Mary making out with another guy. Bigger drives Mary home and goes to his room. However Mary, who is experiencing strong side effects from the drugs, is dancing around outside half-dressed and shouting. Bigger, fearing he will lose his job if Mary is discovered like this by her parents, helps Mary to her room. Mrs. Dalton is awakened by the noise and begins to call out to Mary. Bigger attempts to calm Mary down to no avail and proceeds to hold a pillow over her face to stop the noise. After Mrs. Dalton returns to her room, Bigger discovers that he has accidentally smothered Mary to death. He then drags Mary's body to the furnace room and cremates it.

The next day, Bigger is interviewed by two detectives who have been hired by Mr. Dalton to find his missing daughter. Jan, however, is initially the prime suspect in Mary's disappearance until one of Mary's pieces of jewelry is found in the furnace by another of Mr. Dalton's staff. As police put out a warrant for Bigger's arrest, he goes into hiding. He privately meets up with Jan, who tells Bigger that he should turn himself in. Similarly, Bessie, who has been hiding Bigger, pleads with him to turn himself in too. Bigger convinces Bessie to run away with him instead, and takes her to an abandoned building where they spend the night.

The next morning, Bessie and Bigger have an argument in which Bigger indirectly confesses to killing Mary. Upon further argument, Bigger begins to strangle Bessie to death but comes to his senses and stops himself. Bessie runs away in fear. The police arrive, having been alerted to Bigger's whereabouts by some passersby who spotted Bigger looking out a window of the building. The police confront Bigger, who is turned away with his hands in his jacket pockets. Turning around, Bigger begins to take his hands out of his pockets. The police shoot and kill him, mistakenly believing that he had a gun in his hand.

== Cast ==
- Ashton Sanders as Bigger Thomas
- Margaret Qualley as Mary Dalton
- Nick Robinson as Jan Erlone
- KiKi Layne as Bessie
- Bill Camp as Henry Dalton
- Sanaa Lathan as Trudy Thomas
- Stephen Henderson as Mr. Green
- Lamar Johnson as Jack
- Jerod Haynes as Gus
- Barbara Sukowa as Peggy
- Elizabeth Marvel as Mrs. Dalton
- David Alan Grier as Marty

This version of Bigger has, as described by Troy Patterson of The New Yorker, "goth black" nail polish and "toxic green" dyed hair. He additionally wears jackets with patches and graffiti-like designs. The character enjoys reading Ralph Ellison books and is able to teach himself material. Soraya Nadia McDonald, in an article in The Undefeated, described Bigger here as "afropunk".

Patterson argued that this Bigger is "a bit adrift", "serious and cerebral", and "a late adolescent at loose ends" instead of the "thoughtless lunk" and "social problem" in the original novel. Anna Shechtman of The New Yorker wrote that the 2019 Bigger has a "confident style" stemming from Ellison and that this Bigger "has an assuredness that Wright, Love, and even the character that Wright originally wrote seemed to lack." In the film Bessie describes Bigger as "a fixer upper", reflecting that he has issues to work on.

In this version Jan and Mary are in favor of Occupy Wall Street. Parks chose to change the political affiliations of Jan and Mary because the Communist Party of the United States no longer had the stature it had in the past.

In this version, Bigger's mother works as a paralegal. Bigger's father did accounting before his death. Bigger's mother, in this version, has a boyfriend, who works as a lawyer.

== Production ==
In February 2017, it was announced Rashid Johnson would direct the film, from a screenplay written by Suzan-Lori Parks.

Johnson first read the novel, gifted to him by his mother, in his teenage years. The production team received permission from the estate of Richard Wright to create the film. Parks reviewed the 1951 film and the 1986 film.

In March 2018, it was announced Ashton Sanders, Nick Robinson, Margaret Qualley, Bill Camp and KiKi Layne had been cast in the film. Matthew Perniciaro and Michael Sherman will produce under their Bow and Arrow Entertainment banner, while A24 will distribute. In April 2018, Sanaa Lathan, Connie Nelson, Lamar Johnson and Jerod Haynes joined the cast of the film.

Principal photography began on April 9, 2018, in Cleveland, Ohio. Production concluded on May 6, 2018.

Stranger Things composer's Kyle Dixon & Michael Stein compose the film score. The soundtrack will be released at Milan Records.

The Dalton residence has artwork from African-Americans; Johnson stated that he often saw such art in residences of white liberals.

Parks made Henry Dalton a fan of older technology so a furnace, used to disguise Mary's killing, would be present in his house, and so video cameras would not be present in the scene when Bigger kills Mary. Additionally, the old technology is meant to be representative of existing "structures, systems, and systemic patterns" that are hampering society despite the social progress made.

The film team wanted for Bigger, Bessie, Mary, and Jan to form friendships with one another, something they felt the earlier films had not tried with those characters. Furthermore, Johnson removed Bigger raping Bessie partly because of issues involving sexual assault occurring in the 2010s. He also removed Bessie's death because having her survive would "give Bigger an opportunity to be both complicated and (empathetic) simultaneously, and that was just a step off of a cliff that didn't allow us to tell the story in a (contemporary) way that we thought would facilitate conversation." The team also chose not to include a trial scene, to give more space to the social interactions between Bigger and Mary.

== Release ==
The film had its world premiere at the Sundance Film Festival on January 24, 2019, Prior to, HBO Films acquired U.S. distribution rights to the film. It was released on April 6, 2019.

== Reception ==
On review aggregator website Rotten Tomatoes, the film holds an approval rating of 62% based on 52 reviews, with an average of 6.1/10. The site's critics consensus reads: "Native Son's struggles with its problematic source material are uneven but overall compelling, thanks largely to Ashton Sanders' poised work in the central role." On Metacritic, the film has a weighted average score of 63 out of 100, based on 12 critics, indicating "generally favorable reviews".

Benjamin Lee of The Guardian gave the film four of five stars, calling it "darkly compelling" with a "spellbinding performance", though he criticized it for not having "some connectivity between dramatic events".

Owen Gleiberman of Variety wrote that the film works well in the first half, but that it is constrained by the novel's turns of events in the second half.

Troy Patterson, writing in The New Yorker, argues that the development of the film shows that the original text is out of date and is flawed.

McDonald criticized this film for omitting the killing of Bigger's girlfriend as that plot point could have been used to explore domestic violence in African-American communities. In this version Bigger begins choking Bessie but ultimately does not complete the act, and he does not attempt to rape Bessie.

Prince Shakur, in Teen Vogue, stated that the film shows that systemic factors are still harming black men even in the present day.

== See also ==
- List of black films of the 2010s
