= Native Son =

1940 novel by Richard Wright

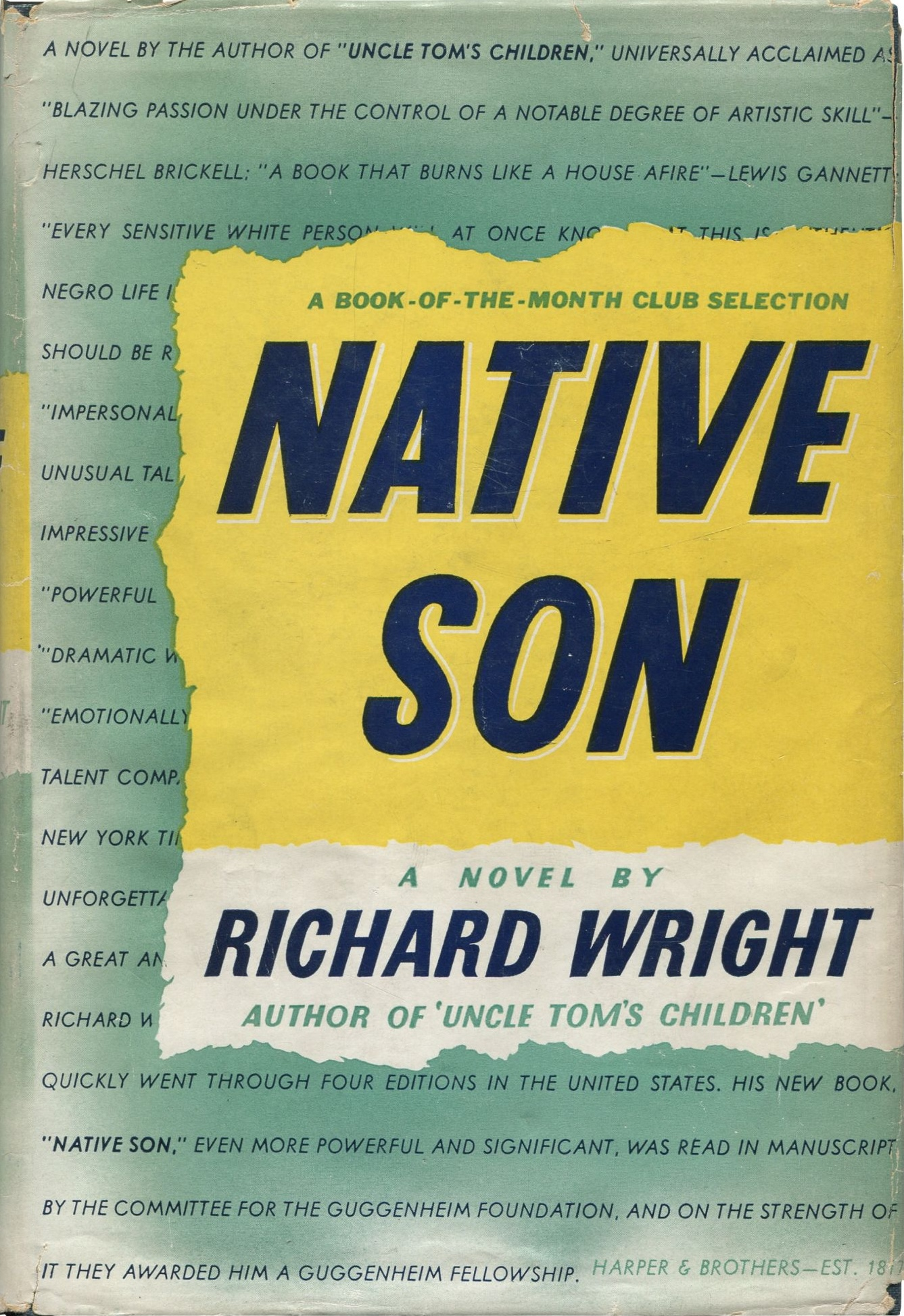
- First edition
- Author: Richard Wright
- Language: English
- Genre: African-American literature, Social protest novel
- Publisher: Harper & Brothers
- Publication date: March 1, 1940
- Publication place: United States
- Media type: Print (hardback & paperback)
- OCLC: 61277693
- Dewey Decimal: 813.52

Native Son (1940) is a novel written by the American author Richard Wright. It tells the story of Bigger Thomas, a 20-year-old black man living in utter poverty in a poor area on Chicago's South Side in the 1930s. Thomas kills a white woman at a time when racism is at its peak and pays the price for it.

While not apologizing for Bigger's crimes, Wright portrays a systemic causation behind them. Bigger's lawyer, Boris Max, makes the case that there is no escape from this destiny for his client or any other black American, since they are the necessary product of the society that formed them and told them since birth who exactly they were supposed to be.

== Plot summary ==
=== Book One: Fear ===
Twenty-year-old Bigger Thomas lives in one room with his brother Buddy, his sister Vera, and their mother. Suddenly, a rat appears. The room turns into a maelstrom, and after a violent chase, Bigger kills the animal with an iron skillet and terrorizes his sister Vera with the dead rat. She faints, and Mrs. Thomas scolds Bigger, who hates his family because they suffer and he cannot do anything about it.

That evening, Bigger has to see Mr. Dalton, a white man, for a new job. Bigger's family depends on him. He would like to leave his responsibilities forever, but when he thinks of what to do, he only sees a blank wall.

Bigger walks to a poolroom and meets his friend, Gus. Bigger tells him that every time he thinks about whites, he feels something terrible will happen to him. They meet other friends, G.H. and Jack, and plan a robbery. They are all afraid of attacking and stealing from a white man, but none of them wants to admit their concerns. Before the robbery, Bigger and Jack go to the movies. They are attracted to the world of wealthy whites in the newsreel and feel strangely moved by the tom-toms and the primitive black people in the film, yet also feel they are equal to those worlds. After the film, Bigger returns to the poolroom and attacks Gus violently, forcing him to lick his blade in a demeaning way to hide Bigger's own cowardice. The fight ends any chance of the robbery occurring, and Bigger is vaguely aware that his actions were intentional.

When he finally gets the job, Bigger does not know how to behave in Dalton's large, luxurious house. Mr. Dalton and his blind wife use strange words. They try to be kind to the young man, but actually make him uncomfortable; Bigger does not know what they expect of him.

Then their daughter, Mary, enters the room, asks Bigger why he is not in a union, and calls her father a "capitalist". Bigger does not know the word and becomes even more confused and fearful that he may lose the job. After the conversation, Peggy, an Irish cook, takes Bigger to his room and tells him the Daltons are a nice family, but he must avoid Mary's Communist friends. After she leaves, Bigger marvels that he has never had a room of his own before.

That night, he drives Mary around and meets her Communist boyfriend Jan. Throughout the evening, Jan and Mary talk to Bigger, oblige him to take them to a diner where their friends are eating, invite him to sit at their table, and tell him to call them by their first names. Bigger does not know how to respond to their requests and becomes frustrated, as he is simply their chauffeur for the night. At the diner, they buy a bottle of rum, then Bigger drives throughout Washington Park while Jan and Mary drink and make out in the back seat. Jan departs, but Mary is so drunk that Bigger has to carry her to her bedroom when they return home. He is terrified someone will see him with her in his arms; however, he still cannot resist the forbidden temptation and kisses her.

Just then, the bedroom door opens, and Mrs. Dalton enters. Bigger knows she is blind but is terrified she will sense him there. Frightened of the consequences if he, a black man, were to be found in Mary's bedroom, he silences Mary by pressing a pillow into her face. Mary claws at Bigger's hands while Mrs. Dalton is in the room, trying to alert Bigger that she cannot breathe. Mrs. Dalton approaches the bed, smells alcohol in the air, scolds her daughter, and leaves. As Bigger removes the pillow, he realizes that Mary has suffocated to death. Bigger starts thinking frantically, and decides he will tell everyone that her boyfriend Jan took Mary into the house that night.

Thinking it will be better if Mary disappears as she was supposed to leave for Detroit in the morning, Bigger decides in desperation to burn her body in the house furnace. Her body initially will not fit through the furnace opening, but after decapitating it, Bigger finally manages to put the corpse inside. He adds extra coal to the furnace, leaves the corpse to burn, and goes home.

=== Book Two: Flight ===
Bigger's current girlfriend Bessie Mears suspects him of having done something to Mary. Bigger goes back to work.

Mr. Dalton has hired a private detective, Mr. Britten, who interrogates Bigger accusingly, but Dalton vouches for Bigger. Bigger relates the events of the previous evening in a way calculated to throw suspicion on Jan, knowing Mr. Dalton dislikes Jan because he is a Communist. When Britten finds Jan, he puts the boy and Bigger in the same room and confronts them with their conflicting stories. Jan is surprised by Bigger's story, but offers him help.

Bigger storms away from the Daltons'. He decides to write a false kidnapping note when he discovers that Mr. Dalton owns the rat-infested flat that Bigger's family rents. Bigger slips the note under the Daltons' front door and then returns to his room.

When the Daltons receive the note, they contact the police, who take over the investigation from Britten, and journalists soon arrive at the house. Bigger is afraid, but does not want to leave. In the afternoon, he is ordered to remove the ashes from the furnace and make a new fire. He is terrified and starts poking the ashes with the shovel until the whole room is full of smoke. Furious, one of the journalists takes the shovel and pushes Bigger aside. He immediately finds the remains of Mary's bones and an earring in the furnace, and Bigger flees.

Bigger goes directly to Bessie and tells her the whole story. Bessie realizes that white people will think he raped the girl before killing her. They leave together, but Bigger has to drag Bessie around because she is paralyzed by fear. When they lie down together in an abandoned building, Bigger rapes Bessie and falls asleep. In the morning, he decides he has to kill her in her sleep. He hits Bessie on the head with a brick before throwing her through a window and into an air shaft, then realizes that the money he had taken from Mary's purse was in Bessie's pocket.

Bigger flees through the city, during which he sees newspaper headlines and overhears various conversations about the crime. Whites hate him for the murder and blacks hate him even more for the shame he brought to the black community. After a frantic chase over the city rooftops, the police finally catch him.

=== Book Three: Fate ===
During his first few days in prison, Bigger does not eat, drink, or talk to anyone. Then Jan comes to visit him. He says Bigger has taught him a lot about black and white relationships, and offers him the help of a Communist lawyer named Boris Max. In the long hours that Max and Bigger spend talking, Bigger starts understanding his relationships with his family and with the world. He acknowledges his fury, his need for a future, and his wish for a meaningful life. He reconsiders his attitudes about white people, whether they are aggressive like Britten or accepting like Jan.

Throughout the trial, the prosecuting team focus primarily on Mary's murder and pay significantly less attention to Bessie's murder. It is also falsely argued that Bigger raped Mary before killing her. The novel finishes with Max's lengthy closing argument. In it, he does not argue that Bigger is innocent. Rather he talks about how whites have intentionally blinded themselves to racial oppression, and that the ghettos, in turn, have fueled oppression and crime. He concludes with the statement that the court cannot sentence Bigger to death when they have not even acknowledged that as a human being he has the right to exist. Max urges for them to give him life in prison instead.

Bigger is found guilty and sentenced to death for murder. As his execution draws near, he appears to have come to terms with his fate.

== Development ==
The Book-of-the-Month Club exerted influence to have Native Son edited. Wright originally had a scene where Bigger and a friend illegally masturbate in a movie theater, and other lines showing that Mary sexually arouses Bigger. Library of America published a restored draft version of the book assembled by editor Arnold Rampersad.

== Characters ==
=== Bigger Thomas ===
The protagonist of the novel, Bigger, commits crimes and is put on trial for his life. He is convicted and sentenced to the electric chair. His acts give the novel action but the real plot involves Bigger's reactions to his environment and his crime. Through it all, Bigger struggles to discuss his feelings, but he can neither find the words to fully express himself nor does he have the time to say them. However, as they have been related through the narration, Bigger – typical of the "outsider" archetype — has finally discovered the only important and real thing: his life. Though too late, his realization that he is alive — and able to choose to befriend Mr. Max — creates some hope that men like him might be reached earlier.

Debatable as the final scene is, in which for the first time Bigger calls a white man by his first name, Bigger is never anything but a failed human. He represents a black man conscious of a system of racial oppression that leaves him no opportunity to exist but through crime. As he says to Gus, "They don't let us do nothing... [and] I can't get used to it." A line goes, one cannot exist by simply reacting: a man must be more than the sum total of his brutalizations. Bigger admits to wanting to be an aviator and later, to Max, aspire to other positions esteemed in the American Dream. But here he can do nothing ... just be one of many blacks in what was called the "ghetto" and maybe get a job serving whites; crime seems preferable, rather than accidental or inevitable. Not surprisingly, then, he already has a criminal history, and he has even been to reform school. Ultimately, the snap decisions which the law calls "crimes" arose from assaults to his dignity and his subsequent violent reaction towards those he feels he is entitled to dominate, and being trapped like the rat he killed with a pan, living a life where others held the skillet.

==== Critical reception ====
Vincent Canby of The New York Times stated that Wright was aware "that he was taking a terrible chance with" the character. The Bigger in the original novel comes from a low socioeconomic background. Troy Patterson of The New Yorker argued that the character in the novel is a "thoughtless lunk" and "social problem". In all versions, Bigger is a chauffeur who accidentally kills Mary Dalton, the daughter of his boss.

University of California at Los Angeles associate English professor Richard Yarborough stated that "Wright didn't want him to be sympathetic, so he made him very brutal. Wright didn't want tears. He felt that pity would be an evasion." Yarborough added, "You can forgive Bigger for the accidental killing but not for the killing of Bessie." Soraya Nadia McDonald, in an article for The Undefeated, stated, "Needless to say, this is not a character who inspires sympathy."

In the novel, Bigger additionally murders his girlfriend, Bessie Mears. Jerrold Freeman, director of the 1986 film, stated that "The scene is pivotal in the novel because it underscores the disintegration of Bigger Thomas, a victim of racism and segregation in Chicago of the 1930's who in turn becomes a victimizer."

Earlier drafts of the novel show that Mary sexually arouses Bigger, but these lines were removed from the final version. Louis Menand wrote in The New Yorker that in the final version, as a result of the cuts, "Bigger's sexuality has always been a puzzle. He hates Mary, and is afraid of her, but she is attractive and is negligent about sexual decorum, and the combination ought to provoke some sort of sexual reaction; yet in the familiar edition it does not."

Wright later wrote an essay called "How 'Bigger' Was Born", which was included as an introduction in reprints of the novel.

=== Mary Dalton ===
An only child, Mary is a rich white girl who has far leftist leanings. She is a Communist sympathizer recently understood to be frolicking with Jan, a known Communist party organizer. Consequently, she is trying to abide, for a time, by her parents' wishes and go to Detroit. She is to leave the morning after Bigger is hired as the family chauffeur. Under the ruse of a University meeting, she has Bigger take her to meet Jan. When they return to the house, she is too drunk to make it to her room unassisted and thus, Bigger helps her. Mrs. Dalton comes upon them in the room and Bigger smothers Mary for fear that Mrs. Dalton will discover him. Although she dies earlier in the story, she remains a significant plot element, as Bigger constantly has flashbacks during stressful times, in which he sees various scenes from her murder.

=== Henry Dalton ===
Father of Mary, owns a controlling amount of stock in a real estate firm that maintains the black ghetto. Blacks in the ghetto pay too much for rat-infested flats. As Max points out at the inquest, Mr. Dalton refuses to rent flats to black people outside of the designated ghetto area. He does this while donating money to the NAACP, buying ping-pong tables for the local black youth outreach program, and giving people like Bigger a chance at employment. Mr. Dalton's philanthropy, however, only shows off his wealth while backing up the business practices that contain an already oppressed people. An example of this is when the reader learns that Mr. Dalton owns the real estate company that controls a lot of the South Side (where most of the black community lives), but instead of using his power to improve their situation, he does things such as donate ping-pong tables to them, or hire individual blacks to work in his house. Mr. Dalton is blind to the real plight of blacks in the ghetto, a plight that he maintains.

=== Mrs. Dalton ===
Mary Dalton's mother. Her blindness serves to accentuate the motif of racial blindness throughout the story. Both Bigger and Max comment on how people are blind to the reality of race in America. Mrs. Dalton betrays her metaphorical blindness when she meets Mrs. Thomas. Mrs. Dalton hides behind her philanthropy and claims there is nothing she can do for Bigger.

=== Jan Erlone ===
Jan is a member of the Communist Party as well as the boyfriend of Mary Dalton. Bigger attempts to frame him for the murder of Mary. Nonetheless, Jan uses this to try to prove that black people aren't masters of their own destinies, but rather, a product of an oppressive white society. Jan had already been seeking a way to understand the 'negro' so as to organize them along communist lines against the rich like Mr. Dalton. He is not able to fully do so, but he is able to put aside his personal trauma and persuade Max to help Bigger. He represents the idealistic young Marxist who hopes to save the world through revolution. However, before he can do that, he must understand the 'negro' much more than he thinks he does.

=== Other characters ===
- Gus: Gus is a member of Bigger's gang, but he has an uneasy relationship with Bigger. Both are aware of the other's nervous anxiety concerning whites. Consequently, Bigger would rather brutalize Gus than admit he is scared to rob a white man.
- Jack Harding: Jack is a member of Bigger's gang and perhaps the only one Bigger ever views as a real friend.
- G.H.: G.H. is another member of Bigger's gang. He is the neutral member of the gang who will do what the gang does, but will not be too closely attached to any one member of the gang.
- Mr. Boris Max: A lawyer from the Communist Party who represents Bigger against the State's prosecuting attorney. As a Jewish American, he is in a position to understand Bigger. It is through his speech during the trial that Wright reveals the greater moral and political implications of Bigger Thomas' life. Even though Mr. Max is the only one who understands Bigger, Bigger still horrifies him by displaying just how damaged white society has made him. When Mr. Max finally leaves Bigger, he is aghast at the extent of the brutality of racism in America. The third part of the novel, called Fate, seems to focus on Max's relationship with Bigger, and because of this Max becomes the main character of Fate.
- Bessie Mears: Bigger's girlfriend. She drinks often, saying that she is trying to forget her hard life. At the end of Book 2, Bigger takes her to an abandoned building and rapes her, then proceeds to kill her in haste to keep her from talking to the police. This is his second killing in the book.
- Peggy: Peggy is the Daltons' Irish-American housekeeper and, like Max, can empathize with Bigger's status as an outsider. However, she is more typical of poor whites who are sure to invest in racism if only to keep someone / anyone below themselves. Peggy hides her dislike for blacks and treats Bigger kindly.
- Buddy Thomas: Buddy, Bigger's younger brother, idolizes Bigger as a male role model. He defends him to the rest of the family and consistently asks if he can help Bigger.
- Mrs. Thomas: Bigger's mother. She struggles to keep her family alive on the meager wages earned by taking in laundry. She is a religious woman who believes she will be rewarded in an afterlife, but as a black woman accepts that nothing can be done to improve her people's situation. Additionally, she knows Bigger will end up hanging from the "gallows" for his crime, but this is just another fact of life.
- Vera Thomas: Vera is Bigger's sister. In her, Bigger sees many similarities to his mother. Bigger fears Vera will grow up to either be like his mother, constantly exhausted with the strain of supporting a family, or like Bessie, a drunk trying to escape her troubles.
- Buckley: The state prosecutor.
- Britten: The Daltons' investigator. He seems quite prejudiced, first toward Bigger (because Bigger is black) and then toward Jan (because Jan is a Communist).

== True crime influence ==
Wright based aspects of the novel on the 1938 arrest and trial of Robert Nixon, executed in 1939 following a series of "brick bat murders" in Los Angeles and Chicago.

== Title ==
Native Son was the original title of Chicago writer Nelson Algren's first novel, Somebody in Boots, based on a piece of doggerel about the first Texan. Algren and Wright had met at Chicago's John Reed Club circa 1933 and later worked together at the Federal Writers' Project in Chicago. According to Bettina Drew's 1989 biography Nelson Algren: A Life on the Wild Side, he bequeathed the title "Native Son" to Wright.

== Literary significance and criticism ==
Wright's protest novel was an immediate best-seller; it sold 250,000 hardcover copies within three weeks of its publication by the Book-of-the-Month Club on March 1, 1940. It was one of the earliest successful attempts to explain the racial divide in America in terms of the social conditions imposed on African Americans by the dominant white society. It also made Wright the wealthiest Black writer of his time and established him as a spokesperson for African-American issues, and the "father of Black American literature." As Irving Howe said in his 1963 essay "Black Boys and Native Sons": "The day Native Son appeared, American culture was changed forever. No matter how much qualifying the book might later need, it made impossible a repetition of the old lies ... [and] brought out into the open, as no one ever had before, the hatred, fear, and violence that have crippled and may yet destroy our culture." The novel's treatment of Bigger and his motivations is an example of literary naturalism.

The book also received criticism from some of Wright's fellow African-American writers. James Baldwin's 1948 essay, Everybody's Protest Novel, dismissed Native Son as protest fiction, as well as limited in its understanding of human character and in artistic value. The essay was collected with nine others in Baldwin's Notes of a Native Son (1955).

In 1991, Native Son was published for the first time in its entirety by the Library of America, together with an introduction, a chronology, and notes by Arnold Rampersad, a well-regarded scholar of African-American literary works. This edition also contains Richard Wright's 1940 essay "How 'Bigger' Was Born". The original edition had a masturbation scene removed at the request of the Book-of-the-Month club.

Native Son is number 27 on Radcliffe's Rival 100 Best Novels List. The Modern Library placed it number 20 on its list of the 100 best novels of the 20th Century. Time Magazine also included the novel in its Time 100 Best English-language Novels from 1923 to 2005.

=== Censorship in the United States ===
The novel has endured a series of challenges in public high schools and libraries all over the United States. Many of these challenges focus on the book's being "sexually graphic", "unnecessarily violent", and "profane." Despite complaints from parents, many schools have successfully fought to keep Wright's work in the classroom. Some teachers believe the themes in Native Son and other challenged books "foster dialogue and discussion in the classroom" and "guide students into the reality of the complex adult and social world."

The book is number 71 on the American Library Association's list of the 100 Most Frequently Challenged Books of 1990–2000.

=== Native Son and the Bible ===
Biblical allusions appear frequently throughout Native Son, but they do not serve as an uplifting component of Bigger Thomas' life. Instead, Richard Wright seems to allude to the Bible with irony. Bigger is exposed to Christianity through his religious mother, Reverend Hammond, a Catholic priest, and his encounter with the church. However, Bigger's constant rejection of Christianity and the church reveals Wright's negative tone toward the religion. He views Christianity as an opiate of the black masses.

Bigger has several negative encounters with religion. In one instance, Bigger hears his mother singing a hymn when he sneaks into his flat to get his pistol to prepare for robbing Blum's delicatessen. His mother is singing the words: "Lord, I want to be a Christian, /In my heart, in my heart." Her hymns and prayers are wholly ineffective and do nothing to forestall his violence. Even toward the end of the novel, with her son facing a possible death sentence, Bigger's mother pleads with him to pray to God for repentance. Reverend Hammond also preaches to Bigger, yet he does not understand the words of Reverend Hammond and does not pray for repentance. Instead, Bigger does the opposite and rejects Christianity. When he later sees the fiery cross that the Ku Klux Klan displays, he tears the cross which Reverend Hammond had given him from his neck and throws it to the ground. In yet another instance, Bigger overhears the church choir singing and ponders whether he should become Christian. However, his contemplation of changing his heart into a humble heart causes him to reject the idea because it meant, "losing his hope of living in the world. And he would never do that."

Wright directly alludes to the Bible in the epigraph of Native Son. The epigraph states, "Even today is my complaint rebellious; my stroke is heavier than my groaning" (Job 23:2). This quotation is from the Book of Job. According to the Bible, Job was a faithful man of God. However, Job experienced immense suffering in his lifetime, losing his children and his great wealth. He was stricken with poverty and boils. In these afflictions, God was silent, leaving Job in a state of deep spiritual anguish. This tone of anguish and despair is established in the epigraph at the outset of Native Son and emphasizes Bigger's suffering.

Job and Bigger are parallel characters in their dealings with suffering. That further suggests the aptness of Wright's epigraph. Job suffered trials from an outside force that he could not control. Similar to Job, Bigger struggled with an outside force of the racial norms of society. The parallel is further strengthened by the freedom both characters display in their defiance.

Savory has mentioned two quotes in the book of Job and Native Son that suggest Bigger and Job's parallel stories. The protagonist of the book of Job lifts himself proudly through his suffering. "If the charges my opponent brings against me were written down so that I could have them, I would wear them proudly around my neck, and hold them up for everyone to see. I would tell God everything I have done, and hold my head high in his presence". During this point of the passage, Job has yet to confess his sins to God. Convinced of his innocence, Job asserts that he will stand proud and tall in God's presence.

Bigger has a similar experience. He muses, "He had done this. He had brought all this about. In all of his life these two murders were the most meaningful things that had ever happened to him. He was living, truly and deeply, no matter what others might think, looking at him with their blind eyes. Never had he had the chance to live out the consequences of his actions: never had his will been so free as in this night and day of fear and murder and flight." It is the first time in the novel where Bigger does not throw the blame on others but instead asserts that he was responsible for his actions. Through that, he finally experiences free will and finds freedom.

=== Influence on Wright by Stowe's Uncle Tom's Cabin ===
Native Son contains several allusions to other works that were significant during Wright's time. One of the major works that influenced Native Son was Harriet Beecher Stowe's Uncle Tom's Cabin (1852), the best-selling novel of the 19th century which also played a major role in the abolitionist movement.

Wright's Native Son (1940) contains multiple similarities to Uncle Tom's Cabin. Like Uncle Tom's Cabin, Native Son can be interpreted as an illustration of the harsh reality of racial injustice in the United States. James Baldwin, writing in the Partisan Review, boldly linked the two novels. In both books, racial injustice is a "pre-ordained pattern set upon the living reality". There is little the characters can do to escape racial discrimination. Additionally, both of these novels are a form of social protest, seek to disprove the idea that society neatly analyzes and treats race, and portrays African Americans who emerge confused, dishonest, and panicked as they are trapped and immobilized as prisoners within the American dream.

The title and content of another book Wright published, the collection of short stories Uncle Tom's Children (1938), suggest the inspiration Stowe's work provided Wright in his own books. Both Uncle Tom's Cabin and Uncle Tom's Children exploit the term "Uncle Tom", attacking an African American who seems to act in a subservient manner toward white people. However, while these two titles are similar and contain similar themes, Wright's Native Son can also be considered reactionary against Uncle Tom's Cabin. Bigger Thomas is the antithesis of Uncle Tom. Bigger is fearful of and angry toward white society. He also lacks the religious background and Christian faith that Uncle Tom possessed. This contrast between the characters of Bigger Thomas and Uncle Tom may be Wright's attempt to show the contemporary racial conflicts that persisted long after the publication of Stowe's novel in 1852.

=== Influence of Communism on Native Son ===
Wright was affiliated with the Communist Party of the United States both prior to and following his publishing of Native Son. The Communist ideas in Native Son are evident as Wright draws a parallel between the Scottsboro boys case and Bigger Thomas' case. One parallel is the court scene in Native Son, in which Max calls the "hate and impatience" of "the mob congregated upon the streets beyond the window" (Wright, p. 386) and the "mob who surrounded the Scottsboro jail with rope and kerosene" after the Scottsboro boys' initial conviction. Critics attacked Max's final speech in the courtroom, claiming that it was an irrelevant elaboration on Wright's own Communist beliefs and unrelated to Bigger's case.

There are many different interpretations concerning which group was the intended target of Max's speech. James Baldwin, a renowned critic of Wright's, presented his own interpretation of Max's final speech in Notes by a Native Son; Baldwin says Max's speech is "addressed to those among us of good will and it seems to say that, though there are whites and blacks among us who hate each other, we will not; there are those who are betrayed by greed, by guilt, by blood, by blood lust, but not we; we will set our faces against them and join hands and walk together into that dazzling future when there will be no white or black" (Baldwin, p. 47). However, other critics, such as Siegel, have argued that the original text in Native Son does not imply "the dazzling future when there will be no white or black".

== Adaptations ==
=== On stage ===
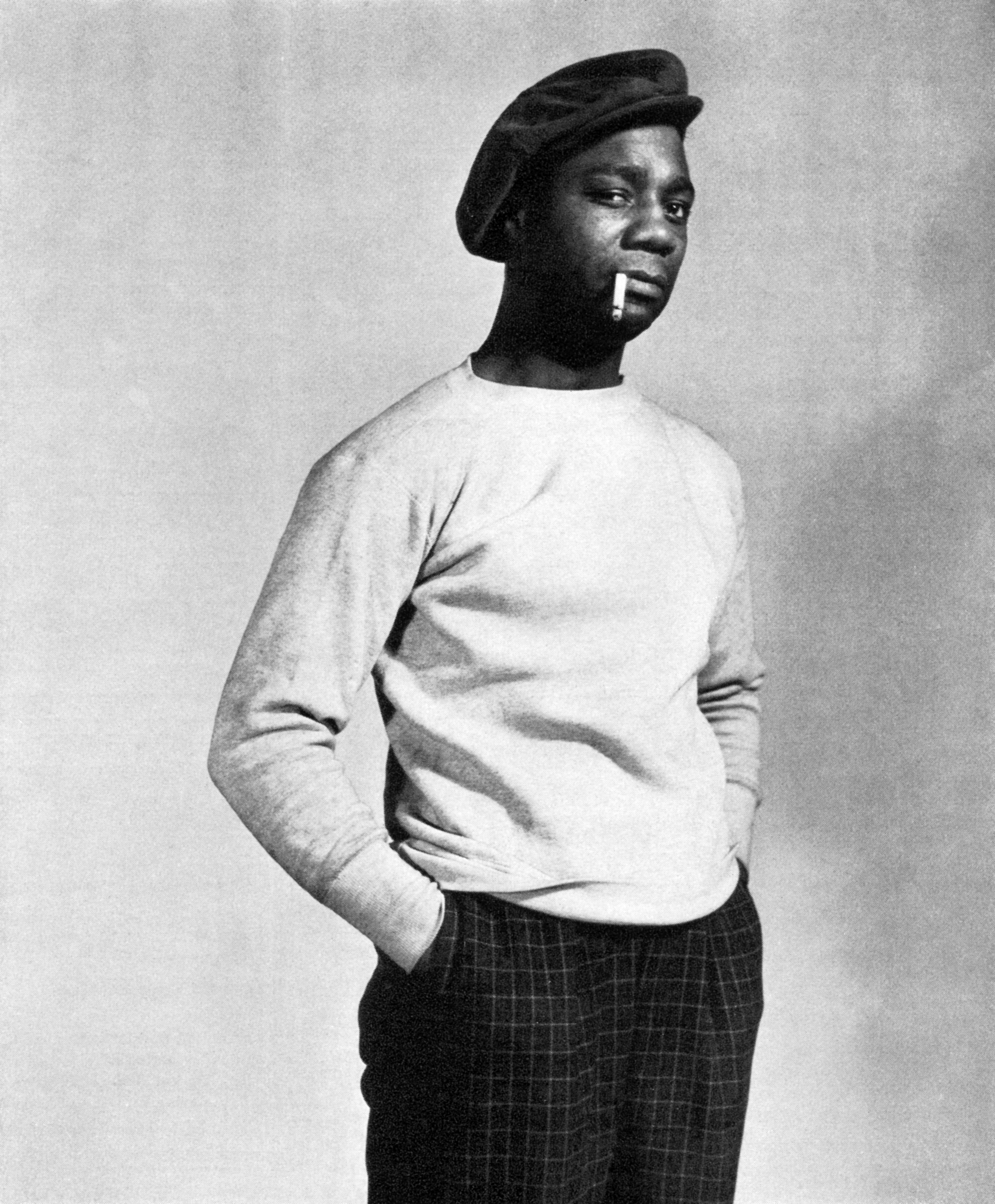
Canada Lee as Bigger Thomas in the original Broadway production of Native Son (1941), produced and directed by Orson Welles

Native Son was adapted for the stage by Wright and Paul Green, with some conflict between the authors affecting the project. The initial production, directed by Orson Welles and with Canada Lee as Bigger, opened at the St. James Theatre on March 24, 1941.

The book was newly adapted and directed again by Kent Gash (in conjunction with the Paul Green Foundation) for Intiman Theatre in Seattle, Washington, in 2006. The production, featuring Ato Essandoh as Bigger Thomas, was a more literal translation of the book than the 1941 version and was a critical success.

In 2014, a stage adaptation by Nambi E. Kelley played the Court Theatre in Chicago with Jerod Haynes starring as Bigger Thomas. Directed by Seret Scott, the show was the highest grossing straight play in the theatre's 60-year history, went on to win multiple awards, and has had celebrated productions across the country, most notably at Yale Repertory Theatre in New Haven, Connecticut. The play can be purchased through Samuel French Publications.

=== In films ===
Native Son has been adapted into a film three times: once in 1951, again in 1986 and a third released in 2019. The first version was made in Argentina. Wright, aged 42, played the protagonist despite being twice the age of 20-year-old Bigger Thomas. The film was not well received; Wright's performance was a particular target of critics.

==== 1986 film ====
Victor Love, who portrayed Bigger in the 1986 film, stated that his appearance and voice not being "street" meant that he did not feel he was initially seriously considered for the role. He was auditioning for Othello, which he did not get, when he was called to perform as Bigger. Love felt that Wright did not really mean for Bigger Thomas to be played unsympathetically and that instead he was afraid to ask people to care for Bigger. According to Love the filmmakers initially refused him the role, but later offered it to him. The 1986 Native Son film omits the murder of Bessie, and Yarborough described this version of Bigger as "much more a sympathetic victim". Canby wrote that this Bigger was acted "in such a passive way that Bigger Thomas never appears capable of taking charge of his own destiny, which is at the heart of Wright's terrifying fable."

==== 2019 film ====
The 2019 film version of Bigger lives in a middle-class household. He has, as described by Patterson, "goth black" nail polish and "toxic green" dyed hair. He also enjoys reading Ralph Ellison books and is able to teach himself material. Anna Shechtman of The New Yorker wrote that the 2019 Bigger has a "confident style" stemming from Ellison and that this Bigger "has an assuredness that Wright, Love, and even the character that Wright originally wrote seemed to lack." In regards to the 2019 film, Patterson stated that this Bigger is "a bit adrift", "serious and cerebral", and "a late adolescent at loose ends". In the film, Bessie describes Bigger as "a fixer upper", reflecting that he has issues to work on. In this version, Bigger begins trying to choke Bessie but ultimately does not do it. Filmmaker Rashid Johnson explained that he removed Bessie's death from the film because having her survive would "give Bigger an opportunity to be both complicated and (empathetic) simultaneously, and that was just a step off of a cliff that didn't allow us to tell the story in a (contemporary) way that we thought would facilitate conversation."

== Allusions and references in other works ==
=== Films ===
Native Son is mentioned in a flashback in the film American History X (1998), when Dennis criticizes his son Derek's teacher for including lessons on African-American literature and affirmative action.

An allusion to the story is presented in part 1 of The Second Renaissance (2003), a short anime film from The Animatrix collection. In this film, a domestic robot named "B1-66ER" is placed on trial for murder. The name is created using Leet Speak.

In the motion picture The Help (2011), the main character (played by Emma Stone) is seen in an oblique camera angle to have a copy of Native Son on her bookshelf.

Film adaptations were released in 1951, 1986 and 2019. The 2019 adaptation was directed by Rashid Johnson and starred Ashton Sanders (as Bigger Thomas), Margaret Qualley, Nick Robinson and KiKi Layne.

=== Literature ===
Notes of a Native Son is the title of a collection of ten essays by James Baldwin, published in 1955, mostly tackling issues of race in America and Europe, that includes critical essays addressing "Native Son". James Baldwin's short story "Previous Condition" mentions a lead part in a play production of Native Son as "type-casting".

In Cecil Brown's novel The Life and Loves of Mr. Jiveass Nigger (1969), the protagonist, George Washington, states that he is not fearful, that he is not a "Bigger Thomas".

Native Son is mentioned in Edward Bunker's novel Little Boy Blue (1981) as being read while in solitary confinement by the main character, Alex Hammond, who is said to be greatly fascinated by it.

A large section of Percival Everett's novel Erasure (1999) contains a parody of Native Son, entitled "My Pafology".

A line from the trial speech by Bigger Thomas' lawyer, Boris Max, is woven into the plot of Lemony Snicket's book, The Penultimate Peril (2005): "Richard Wright, an American novelist of the realist school, asks a famous unfathomable question.... 'Who knows when some slight shock,' he asks, 'disturbing the delicate balance between social order and thirsty aspiration, shall send the skyscrapers in our cities toppling?' ... So when Mr. Wright asks his question, he might be wondering if a small event, such as a stone dropping into a pond, can cause ripples in the system of the world, and tremble the things that people want, until all this rippling and trembling brings down something enormous,..."

In Ron Suskind's book A Hope in the Unseen (1998), Native Son is referenced during a discussion the main character takes part in at Brown University.

=== Music ===
Bigger Thomas is mentioned in one of the lyrical hooks of "The Ritual" in Saul Williams's The Inevitable Rise and Liberation of NiggyTardust! (2007).

The U2 song "Vertigo" was called "Native Son" by the band during the recording sessions for How to Dismantle an Atomic Bomb (2004). The song was originally released digitally as part of Unreleased & Rare, which debuted in The Complete U2 (2004), and later in U2: Medium, Rare & Remastered (2009).

=== Television ===
On the HBO series Brave New Voices, during the 2008 finals, the Chicago team performed a poem called "Lost Count: A Love Story". This poem addresses the youth on youth murder in Chicago and includes the phrase: "Being brown in Bigger Thomas' town".

In the Star Trek: Deep Space Nine episode, "Far Beyond the Stars" (1998), Benny Russell cites Native Son as an example of a significant work of African-American literature.

HBO released Native Son, a film adaptation of the book, on April 6, 2019. It was directed by Rashid Johnson, starring Ashton Sanders as Bigger Thomas and Kiki Layne as Bessie Mears.

== Critical reception ==
Critical reception remains mixed, given disparities in the perception of Bigger Thomas: "Is he a helpless victim of his environment? A symbol of the proletariat empowered by violence? Is the incompleteness of Bigger's personality a realistic portrayal or an act of bad faith that succumbs to racist caricature?" Audiences were also split along the divide of race and gender: they were forced to choose between sympathizing with a rapist, or condemn him and ignore that he was a victim of systemic racism. Said Ayana Mathis of The New York Times, "I don't imagine many black people would have embraced such a grotesque portrait of themselves. [...] What future, what vision is reflected in such a miserable and incompletely realized creature?"

James Baldwin wrote: "No American Negro exists who does not have his private Bigger Thomas living in his skull." Frantz Fanon discussed the novel in his 1952 essay "L'expérience vécue du noir" ("The Fact of Blackness"). "In the end", wrote Fanon, "Bigger Thomas acts. To put an end to his tension, he acts, he responds to the world's anticipation." The book was a successful and groundbreaking best seller. However, it was also criticized by Baldwin and others as ultimately advancing Bigger as a stereotype, and not a real character.

Shechtman wrote that the character "was a disgrace" to middle-class African Americans, adding that liberal white Americans saw Bigger more positively as "a black antihero, claiming their interest and testing their sympathy". Canby concurred that middle-class African Americans saw the character negatively, adding that white people who held prejudice against blacks had their beliefs that black men were sexual threats confirmed by the character. Shechtman stated that, overall, the character "had quickly become lodged in the country's popular imagination".

Ellison wrote that "Bigger Thomas had none of the finer qualities of Richard Wright, none of the imagination, none of the sense of poetry, none of the gaiety. And I preferred Richard Wright to Bigger Thomas." The initial release of the 1950 film was heavily edited. An African-American newspaper review described the edited film as "leaving the audience with no choice but to condemn" Bigger, due to omission of key characteristics.

== Analysis ==
David Bradley wrote in The New York Times that, in his first reading of the novel, while he strongly disliked the work, "It wasn't that Bigger failed as a character, exactly" as Bradley knew of the author's intentions to make Bigger unlikeable, but Bradley felt the author did not succeed in making Bigger symbolize ordinary black men. Upon reading an edition of the book with an introduction, Bradley stated "Suddenly I realized that many readers of Native Son had seen Bigger Thomas as a symbol". Upon researching other writings from the author Bradley interpreted Bigger as Wright's autobiographical view of himself, and Bradley changed his own view to see the work as a tragedy despite Wright initially not meaning for this.

Clyde Taylor, an associate professor of English at Tufts University, criticized Bradley's view, claiming that the analysis failed to perceive how the work "disrupted the accommodation to racism through polite conventions in American social discourse".

== See also ==
- African-American literature
- Black Boy
- Richard Wright

== Plot references ==
- Native Son, ISBN 0-06-080977-9
- Native Son, ISBN 0-06-081249-4
- Native Son (the restored text established by The Library of America), ISBN 0-06-083756-X
- Overview of Native Son at Sparknotes
