= The Retrieval =

- Theatrical release poster
- Directed by: Chris Eska
- Written by: Chris Eska
- Produced by: Jacob Esquivel; Jason Wehling
- Starring: Ashton Sanders; Tishuan Scott; Keston John; Bill Oberst Jr.; Christine Horn; Alfonso Freeman
- Cinematography: Yasu Tanida
- Edited by: Chris Eska
- Music by: Matthew Weidemann; Yellow 6
- Production companies: Arts+Labor; Doki-Doki Productions; Sixth Street Films
- Distributed by: Variance Films
- Release dates: March 11, 2013 (SXSW); April 2, 2014 (United States)
- Running time: 93 minutes
- Country: United States
- Language: English

The Retrieval is a 2013 American drama film written and directed by Chris Eska. The film stars Ashton Sanders, Tishuan Scott, Keston John, Bill Oberst Jr., Christine Horn and Alfonso Freeman. The film was released on April 2, 2014, by Variance Films.

The film centers around Will, a Black boy during the American Civil War, and Nate— a Black Union soldier who is the target of bounty hunters. Will has been forcibly pressed into a bounty hunter gang, because his age and assumed innocence are useful in luring unsuspecting targets in. He plots to deliver Nate from up North down to a prearranged location in the South for his gang to kill Nate, but along the way he struggles with this decision as Nate becomes more of a father figure.

== Cast ==
- Ashton Sanders as Will
- Tishuan Scott as Nate
- Keston John as Marcus
- Bill Oberst Jr. as Burrell
- Christine Horn as Rachel
- Alfonso Freeman as Isaac
- Raven Nicole LeDeatte as Abby
- Jonathan Brooks as Royce
- Jody Stelzig as Chasing Cavalryman
- Sam Pullin as Ryan

== Release ==
The film premiered at South by Southwest on March 11, 2013. The film was released on April 2, 2014, by Variance Films.

== See also ==
- List of films featuring slavery
