= The Sleepwalker Killing =

- Genre: Crime; Drama
- Based on: Unsolved Mysteries
- Written by: June Callwood; Lyle Slack
- Directed by: John Cosgrove
- Starring: Hilary Swank; Jeffrey Nordling; Charles Esten; Natalija Nogulich; Lisa Darr
- Music by: Gary Malkin
- Country of origin: United States
- Original language: English

Production
- Executive producers: John Cosgrove; Terry Dunn Meurer
- Producers: John Cosgrove; Lyle Slack; Cyrus Yavneh
- Cinematography: Eric Van Haren Noman
- Editor: Edward A. Warschilka
- Running time: 88 minutes
- Production companies: Cosgrove/Meurer Productions; World International Network

Original release
- Network: NBC
- Release: April 28, 1997

The Sleepwalker Killing also known as From the Files of Unsolved Mysteries: The Sleepwalker Killing, is a 1997 TV movie based on a popular real-life case from the Unsolved Mysteries television series. The film was written by June Callwood and Lyle Slack and directed by John Cosgrove. Cosgrove also served as executive producer on the TV series.

== Plot ==
A segment from the Unsolved Mysteries TV series inspired this story, in which Mark Schall kills his mother-in-law and wounds his father-in-law in the middle of the night, then turns himself in. He claims, however, that he cannot remember the crime itself. His defense team finds evidence that suggests the crimes were committed while Mark was sleep walking. They build their defense around this theory.

== Cast ==
- Hilary Swank as Lauren Schall
- Jeffrey Nordling as Det. Lloyd Boyko
- Charles Esten as Mark Schall
- Natalija Nogulich as Atty. Brooke McAdam
- Lisa Darr as D.A. Mary Ellen Matulus
- Sean Murray as Christopher Lane
- Victor Love as Det. Ike Nolan
- Marisa Coughlan as Tanya Lane
- Sam Anderson as Roth Lane
- Julianna McCarthy as Eileen Hunter
- Joel Polis as Asst. Atty. Jimmy
- John Rubinstein as Dr. Frank Corrigan

== Releases ==
The TV movie was originally aired NBC on April 28, 1997 and was released later released on DVD on May 24, 2005.
