= The Equalizer 2 =

2018 American action crime drama film directed by Antoine Fuqua

- Theatrical release poster
- Directed by: Antoine Fuqua
- Written by: Richard Wenk
- Based on: The Equalizer by Michael Sloan; Richard Lindheim
- Produced by: Todd Black; Jason Blumenthal; Denzel Washington; Alex Siskin; Steve Tisch; Antoine Fuqua; Mace Neufeld; Tony Eldridge; Michael Sloan
- Starring: Denzel Washington; Pedro Pascal; Ashton Sanders; Bill Pullman; Melissa Leo
- Cinematography: Oliver Wood
- Edited by: Conrad Buff IV
- Music by: Harry Gregson-Williams
- Production companies: Columbia Pictures; Escape Artists; Zhiv Productions; Mace Neufeld Productions; Picture Farm
- Distributed by: Sony Pictures Releasing
- Release date: July 20, 2018 (United States)
- Running time: 121 minutes
- Country: United States
- Language: English
- Budget: $62–79 million
- Box office: $190 million

The Equalizer 2 (also promoted as The Equalizer II and EQ2) is a 2018 American vigilante action-thriller film directed by Antoine Fuqua. It is the sequel to the 2014 film The Equalizer, which was based on the TV series of the same name, as well as the second installment of The Equalizer trilogy. The film stars Denzel Washington in the lead role, Pedro Pascal, Ashton Sanders, Melissa Leo, Bill Pullman, and Orson Bean in his final film role. It follows Marine Corps veteran and retired DIA officer Robert McCall as he sets out on a path of revenge after an associate is murdered. The film is the fourth collaboration between Washington and Fuqua, following Training Day (2001), The Equalizer (2014), and The Magnificent Seven (2016), and marks the first time Washington has starred in a sequel to one of his films.

Talks of a sequel began seven months before the first film was released. The project was officially announced in April 2015. Filming began in September 2017 and took place in Boston and other areas in Massachusetts.

The Equalizer 2 was released in the United States on July 20, 2018, by Sony Pictures Releasing. The film received mixed reviews and was a commercial success, like its predecessor, grossing $190 million worldwide. Another sequel, The Equalizer 3, was released on September 1, 2023.

== Plot ==
After taking down Pushkin's operations, (Note: As depicted in The Equalizer (2014)) Robert McCall works as a driver and assists the less fortunate with the help of his close friend and former DIA colleague Susan Plummer. McCall travels to Istanbul, and disguises himself as a bearded Turkish man to retrieve a 9-year-old girl kidnapped by her father and returns her to her mother (who is the owner of a bookstore he frequents).

With Susan's assistance, McCall gathers information for Sam Rubinstein, an elderly Holocaust survivor looking to recover a painting of his long-dead sister. After McCall returns home to find that his apartment's courtyard has been vandalized, he accepts an offer from Miles Whittaker, a troubled teenaged resident with artistic talent, to paint a mural on the walls. McCall also helps one of his passengers, a young woman named Amy, who shows signs of having been drugged and assaulted. He takes her to the hospital and returns to brutally beat the men who attacked her.

Susan and DIA officer Dave York, McCall's former partner, are called to investigate the murder-suicide of an agency affiliate and his wife in Brussels. Susan is accosted in her hotel room and killed during what seems to be a robbery. McCall determines that the expertly delivered fatal knifing means that Susan was targeted and that the murder-suicide was also staged.

McCall reveals to Dave that he is still alive and informs him of his findings. When McCall is attacked by an assassin posing as a passenger, he kills the man and retrieves his mobile phone, discovering Dave's number on its call list. McCall confronts Dave at his home. Dave confesses that soon after McCall's supposed death, their unit was disbanded by the government. He and the rest of the team became contract killers. Dave says that he killed Susan because she would have figured out that he was behind the Brussels killings.

When McCall leaves Dave's house, he confronts his teammates: Kovac, Ari, and Resnik. Before departing, he promises to kill them all to avenge Susan's death. Resnik and Ari head to Susan's house to kill her husband Brian, but McCall helps him escape. Dave and Kovac break into McCall's apartment, where Miles is painting the walls. Monitoring the apartment via webcams, McCall directs Miles to hide in a secret safe room and makes a call to Dave to lure him away. When Miles emerges from hiding, Dave and Kovac capture him for leverage.

Dave deduces that McCall has gone to his evacuated stormy seaside hometown. Once there, Kovac, Ari, and Resnik search the town in hurricane winds while Dave positions himself on top of a watchtower. McCall stealthily subdues Dave's teammates one by one. He impales Kovac with a harpoon fired from a speargun and kills Ari with two knives. Then, McCall leads Resnik to a trap in his deceased wife's bakery, triggering a flour explosion that dispatches Resnik ignited by his own stun grenade.

Now alone, Dave reveals that he has Miles tied up and gagged in the trunk of his car. He fires several taunting shots to lure out McCall, but McCall foils his last shot by shooting the car's tires to lower it. Dave, having been knocked down by the wind as it grows stronger, yells at McCall about failing to save Susan and attempting to save Miles. McCall surprises Dave on the tower. After a fight, McCall stabs Dave with his own knife in the abdomen in a similar fashion to Susan's fate, slashes the back of Dave's neck, and throws his body into the sea. He then rescues Miles, and the two retreat into his home to bind their wounds and wait for the hurricane to blow over.

Back in Boston, Susan's information about Sam's painting helps McCall reunite Sam with his long-lost sister. Miles finishes painting the mural on the apartment complex's brick wall, returns to school, and focuses on his art. McCall's neighbor, Fatima, notices Miles' new mural. Having moved back into his old house, McCall looks out towards the sea.

== Cast ==
- Denzel Washington as Robert McCall
- Pedro Pascal as Dave York
- Ashton Sanders as Miles Whittaker
- Orson Bean as Sam Rubinstein
- Bill Pullman as Brian Plummer
- Melissa Leo as Susan Plummer
- Jonathan Scarfe as Resnik
- Sakina Jaffrey as Fatima

== Production ==
=== Development and casting ===
On February 24, 2014, seven months before the release of The Equalizer, it was announced that Sony Pictures and Escape Artists were planning a sequel to the first film, with Richard Wenk penning the script again. In early October 2014, Antoine Fuqua stated that there would be a sequel to the film only if audiences and Denzel Washington wanted it. Fuqua said vigilante Robert McCall was an interesting character, and that the sequel could have more of an international flavor.

On April 22, 2015, Sony officially announced a sequel, with Washington returning to his role as McCall. Fuqua's returning was not yet confirmed. In September 2016, producer Todd Black revealed that the script of the film was complete, and that Fuqua would return to direct, with shooting set to begin in September 2017.

On August 21, 2017, Pedro Pascal was cast in an unspecified role. Two days later, Melissa Leo and Bill Pullman were confirmed to reprise their roles from the first film, as Susan and Brian Plummer, and it was reported that the film would be produced by Jason Blumenthal, Black, Washington, Steve Tisch, Mace Neufeld, Alex Siskin and Tony Eldridge. On August 24, 2017, Ashton Sanders joined the film to play a character who comes to consider Washington's McCall a father figure. On March 25, 2018, it was revealed that Sakina Jaffrey had also been added to the cast.

=== Filming ===
Principal photography on the film began in the South End area of Boston, Massachusetts, on September 14, 2017. Filming also took place on Lynn Shore Drive in Lynn, Massachusetts, the Powder Point Bridge in Duxbury, Massachusetts, as well as in Brant Rock, Massachusetts. The final action scene was filmed here. Interior scenes were filmed in a studio in Canton, Massachusetts.

While Sony and other publications reported the film was made on a net production budget of $62 million, Deadline Hollywood stated their sources insisted the cost was "in the high [$70 million]" range after Massachusetts tax credits.

== Release ==
=== Theatrical ===
The Equalizer 2 was released on July 20, 2018, by Sony Pictures. Sony had originally scheduled the film for a September 29, 2017, release, but on November 3, 2016, the film was pushed to September 14, 2018, and then on September 28, 2017, the release date was brought forward to August 3, 2018, but then on February 13, 2018, it got settled on its July 20, 2018 release.

=== Home media ===
The Equalizer 2 was released on Digital HD on November 13, 2018, and on Ultra HD Blu-ray, Blu-ray and DVD on December 11, 2018, by Sony Pictures Home Entertainment.

== Reception ==
=== Box office ===
The Equalizer 2 grossed $102 million in the United States and Canada, and $88 million in other territories, for a total worldwide total of $190.4 million, against a production budget of $62 million.

In the United States and Canada, The Equalizer 2 was released alongside two other sequels, Mamma Mia! Here We Go Again and Unfriended: Dark Web, and was projected to gross $27–32 million from 3,388 theaters in its opening weekend. It made $3.1 million from Thursday night previews, double the $1.45 million earned by the original film in 2014, and $13.5 million on its first day. It went on to debut to $35.8 million, finishing first at the box office. It also bested the opening of the first film ($34.1 million) and was the third-best domestic start for Washington. It fell 61% to $14 million in its second weekend, finishing third behind newcomer Mission: Impossible – Fallout and Mamma Mia!, and in its third weekend grossed $8.8 million, dropping to fifth place.

=== Critical response ===
On review aggregator Rotten Tomatoes, the film holds an approval rating of 52% based on 211 reviews, with an average rating of 5.6/10. The website's critical consensus reads: "The Equalizer 2 delivers the visceral charge of a standard vigilante thriller, but this reunion of trusted talents ultimately proves a disappointing case study in diminishing returns." On Metacritic, the film has a weighted average score of 50 out of 100, based on 43 critics, indicating "mixed or average reviews". Audiences surveyed by CinemaScore gave the film an average grade of "A" on an A+ to F scale, up from the first film's "A−", while those polled by PostTrak gave it an 86% overall positive score, with 69% saying they would definitely recommend it.

David Ehrlich of IndieWire gave the film a "C−", saying: "The good news is that fans of Antoine Fuqua's The Equalizer—a bland and pulpy 2014 riff on the '80s TV series of the same name—are in for more of the same. The bad news is the rest of us are too."

== Sequel ==
In August 2018, Fuqua announced his plans to continue the film series, expressing interest in the plot taking place in an international setting.

By January 2022, a third Equalizer film was confirmed to be in development, with Washington to return in the titular role. Fuqua is slated to direct the film. Principal photography was scheduled to commence sometime in 2022, with Washington announcing that the film would be the next he makes.

In April 2022, Sony confirmed that the film was set to be released on September 1, 2023. Filming began in October 2022 on the Amalfi Coast in Italy.
