= KiKi Layne =

American actress (born 1991)

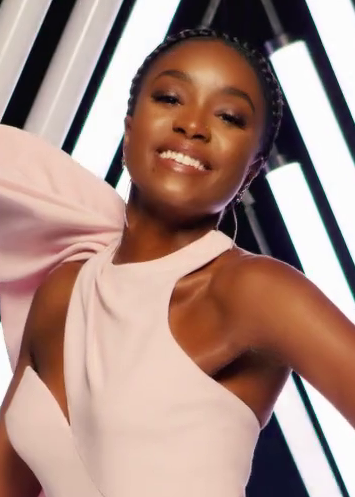
- Layne in 2019
- Born: Kiandra Layne; December 10, 1991 (age 34); Cincinnati, Ohio, U.S.
- Education: DePaul University (BFA)
- Occupation: Actress
- Years active: 2015–present

Kiandra "KiKi" Layne (born December 10, 1991) is an American actress. She is known for her film roles in the romantic drama If Beale Street Could Talk (2018), the drama Native Son (2019), the action superhero film The Old Guard (2020), the romantic comedy Coming 2 America (2021), and the psychological thriller Don't Worry Darling (2022).

== Early life ==
Layne is from Cincinnati, Ohio. She earned a BFA in acting from The Theatre School at DePaul University in 2014.

In a 2018 interview with Vanity Fair, Layne said that she was always acting growing up and that her favorite movie as a child was The Lion King. She said, "I used to watch it every day and create these extravagant stories with my Barbies and stuffed animals."

== Career ==
Layne's first acting role was with Lena Waithe in the pilot for the drama series The Chi, filmed in 2015.

She has modeled for the fashion brand Kate Spade New York.

Layne's breakout role was in Barry Jenkins' 2018 drama If Beale Street Could Talk. She starred in the 2019 screen adaptation of Richard Wright’s 1940 novel Native Son, then alongside Charlize Theron in 2020's The Old Guard, directed by Gina Prince-Bythewood.

Layne was featured in composer Max Richter's Voices, which was inspired by the Universal Declaration of Human Rights. The album contains readings of the Declaration by Eleanor Roosevelt and Layne, with a further 70 readings by people around the world.

In 2021, Layne joined the cast alongside Eddie Murphy in the Amazon Prime sequel Coming 2 America.

Layne stars as Detective Ellie Steckler in Chip 'n Dale: Rescue Rangers.

She reprised her The Old Guard role in 2025's The Old Guard 2.

== Personal life ==
Layne is currently in a relationship with Ari'el Stachel, whom she met on the set of Don't Worry Darling in the fall of 2020.

== Filmography ==
Year	Title	Role	Notes
2015	Veracity	Olivia	Short film
2016	Chicago Med	Emmie Miles	Episode: "Soul Care"
2018	If Beale Street Could Talk	Tish Rivers	
2019	Native Son	Bessie	
2019	Captive State	Carrie	
2019	The Staggering Girl	Adut	Short film
2020	The Old Guard	Nile Freeman	
2021	Coming 2 America	Meeka Joffer	
2022	Chip 'n Dale: Rescue Rangers	Ellie Steckler	
2022	Don't Worry Darling	Margaret	
2024	Dandelion	Dandelion	Also executive producer
2025	The Old Guard 2	Nile Freeman	
2026	Killing Castro	TBA	

== Awards and nominations ==
Association	Year	Work	Category	Result	Ref.
Black Reel Awards	2019	If Beale Street Could Talk	Outstanding Actress, Motion Picture	Won	
Black Reel Awards	2019	If Beale Street Could Talk	Outstanding Breakthrough Performance, Female	Nominated	
Black Reel Awards	2021	The Old Guard	Outstanding Supporting Actress, Motion Picture	Nominated	
Critics' Choice Super Awards	2021	The Old Guard	Best Actress in a Superhero Movie	Nominated	
Georgia Film Critics Association	2018	If Beale Street Could Talk	Breakthrough Award	Nominated	
Gotham Awards	2018	If Beale Street Could Talk	Best Breakthrough Actor	Nominated	
NAACP Image Awards	2019	If Beale Street Could Talk	Outstanding Actress in a Motion Picture	Nominated	
NAACP Image Awards	2019	If Beale Street Could Talk	Outstanding Breakthrough Performance in a Motion Picture	Nominated	
Seattle Film Critics Society	2018	If Beale Street Could Talk	Best Ensemble Cast	Nominated	
Washington D.C. Area Film Critics Association	2018	If Beale Street Could Talk	Best Acting Ensemble	Nominated	
Women Film Critics Circle	2018	If Beale Street Could Talk	Breakthrough Award	Nominated	
Women Film Critics Circle	2018	If Beale Street Could Talk	Best Ensemble	Nominated	
Women Film Critics Circle	2018	KiKi Layne & Stephan James	Best Screen Couple	Won	
