= Ashton Sanders =

American actor (b. 1995)

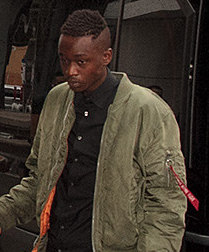
- Sanders at 2016 TIFF
- Born: Ashton Durrand Sanders; October 24, 1995 (age 30); Carson, California, U.S.
- Education: DePaul University (attended)
- Occupation: Actor
- Years active: 2012–present

Ashton Durrand Sanders (born October 24, 1995) is an American actor best known for his acclaimed portrayal of teenage Chiron in the Academy Award-winning film Moonlight (2016). He has since acted in films such as The Equalizer 2 (2018), All Day and a Night (2020), and Judas and the Black Messiah (2021). He portrayed Bigger Thomas in Native Son (2019) and Bobby Brown in Whitney Houston: I Wanna Dance with Somebody (2022).

== Early life and education ==
Sanders was born in Carson, California. He attended Grand Arts High School in Downtown Los Angeles, from which he graduated in 2014. He was studying towards a BFA at The Theatre School at DePaul University, before leaving after three years in 2016 to focus on his acting career.

== Career ==
Sanders made his film debut in The Retrieval, directed by Chris Eska. The film had its world premiere at South by Southwest on March 11, 2013. It was released in a limited release on April 2, 2014, by Variance Films.

In 2015, Sanders had a small role in Straight Outta Compton. In 2016, he appeared in an episode of Refinery29's web series The Skinny.

The same year, Sanders appeared in the drama film Moonlight, directed by Barry Jenkins. The film had its world premiere at the Telluride Film Festival on September 2, 2016, and began a limited release on October 21, 2016, by A24. Moonlight received massive critical acclaim as well dozens of accolades, including the Golden Globe Award for Best Picture – Drama. The film also won three Academy Awards for Best Picture, Best Adapted Screenplay, and Best Supporting Actor for Mahershala Ali. Sanders' role in the film was praised by critics; Benjamin Lee of The Guardian called his performance "powerful".

Sanders co-starred in The Equalizer 2, a sequel to the hit action film The Equalizer, opposite Denzel Washington. In 2019, Sanders starred in Rupert Wyatt's science fiction thriller film Captive State, opposite John Goodman and Vera Farmiga. He also played the lead in HBO's adaptation of the novel Native Son. Sanders was cast as Bobby "RZA" Diggs on the Hulu biographical drama series Wu-Tang: An American Saga. The series ran for three seasons from September 4, 2019, to April 5, 2023. In November 2020, he was set to star in The Things They Carried, a Vietnam War movie with an ensemble cast.

In September 2021, Sanders was cast as Bobby Brown in Whitney Houston: I Wanna Dance with Somebody, a biopic feature on Whitney Houston.

== Filmography ==
=== Film ===
Year	Title	Role	Notes
2012	Making Possibilities	Donnie	Short film Los Angeles Film and Script Festival Honorable Mention
2013	The Retrieval	Will	
2015	Straight Outta Compton	Kid on bus	
2016	Moonlight	Teen Chiron	Austin Film Critics Association Special Honorary Award for Best Ensemble; Gotham Special Jury Award – Ensemble Performance; Independent Spirit Robert Altman Award; MTV Movie Award for Best Kiss; Nominated – Black Reel Award for Outstanding Supporting Actor; Nominated – Black Reel Award for Outstanding Breakthrough Performance, Male; Nominated – Screen Actors Guild Award for Outstanding Performance by a Cast in a Motion Picture
2016	We Home	Javan	Short film
2016	The Last Virgin in LA	Josh	Short film
2018	The Equalizer 2	Miles Whittaker	
2018	The Kids Are Alright	Angel	Short film based on the Grammy-nominated album The Kids Are Alright by Chloe x Halle
2019	Native Son	Bigger Thomas	
2019	Captive State	Gabriel Drummond	
2020	All Day and a Night	Jahkor	
2021	Judas and the Black Messiah	Jimmy Palmer	
2022	Whitney Houston: I Wanna Dance with Somebody	Bobby Brown	
2026	Brothers Under Fire	Lieutenant Carson	
2026	Corporate Retreat	Carl Thomas	

=== Television ===
Year	Title	Role	Notes
2016	The Skinny	Tyler	Episode: "Squad"
2019	Wu-Tang: An American Saga	Bobby/The RZA	Series regular
2022	The Proud Family: Louder and Prouder	College Kareem (voice)	Episode: "When You Wish Upon a Roker"
2025	Invasion	Joel	Recurring (season 3)
