= Captive State =

2019 American film by Rupert Wyatt

- Theatrical release poster
- Directed by: Rupert Wyatt
- Written by: Erica Beeney; Rupert Wyatt
- Produced by: David Crockett; Rupert Wyatt
- Starring: John Goodman; Ashton Sanders; Jonathan Majors; Colson Baker; Vera Farmiga
- Cinematography: Alex Disenhof
- Edited by: Andrew Groves
- Music by: Rob Simonsen
- Production companies: Participant Media; Lightfuse & Gettaway
- Distributed by: Focus Features
- Release date: March 15, 2019
- Running time: 109 minutes
- Country: United States
- Language: English
- Budget: $25 million
- Box office: $9.4 million

Captive State is a 2019 American science fiction thriller film directed, co-written, and produced by Rupert Wyatt. The film stars John Goodman, Ashton Sanders, Jonathan Majors, Colson Baker, and Vera Farmiga, and follows a young man who conspires to rebel against an alien race that had invaded Earth and imposed martial law on humanity almost a decade earlier. Captive State was released in the United States on March 15, 2019, by Focus Features. It received mixed reviews from critics and was a box-office bomb, grossing $9 million against a $25 million budget.

== Plot ==
In 2018, Chicago is placed under martial law after a global extraterrestrial invasion. As the Drummond family attempts to flee the city, they break through a barricade but are confronted by the aliens, who vaporize the parents but leave their sons Gabriel and Rafe alive.

By 2027, the world has capitulated to the alien "Legislators", submitting to their governance. Humans are conscripted to build "Closed Zones", underground habitats for the aliens with access only granted to and by high government officials.

Gabriel Drummond, living in the impoverished Pilsen neighborhood, is confronted by Chicago Police Special Branch Commander William Mulligan, who was partnered with Gabriel's father before the invasion. Mulligan is convinced that the Phoenix resistance group has not been neutralized, contrary to what the public has been told, but Gabriel offers him no information.

Gabriel meets with a member of Phoenix to sell a hand-rolled cigarette containing secret information received from a coworker. The man takes him to Wicker Park, where he meets his brother Rafe, the leader of the resistance. Rafe takes the coded cigarette and directs Gabriel to leave as Phoenix is planning to attack the upcoming Unity Rally at Soldier Field. Rushing to his apartment and hastily packing, Gabriel is again confronted by Mulligan, who had him under surveillance. Gabriel evades Mulligan and hides underground.

The cigarette’s code allows Rafe's team to access Chicago's surveillance system and the deployment patterns of law enforcement units. Rafe and other Phoenix members attack the Unity Rally, using an invisible alien explosive device against the aliens when they arrive. The attack initially appears successful, but the city is subsequently locked down and swarmed by security forces in response. Angered by the attack, the aliens bring in hunters from off-world to seek out the perpetrators, finding Rafe and his accomplices Anita and Daniel. Anita is vaporized and Daniel ingests a cyanide pill to avoid capture, but Rafe is shot and arrested by Mulligan before he can ingest his cyanide pill.

Gabriel emerges from hiding but is taken into custody during a police raid. Mulligan shows him his brother being tortured for information and convinces him to send a message through the Phoenix network in hopes of meeting the supposed ringleader, Number One. Gabriel is eventually led to Jane Doe, a prostitute running a brothel in Pilsen, who acknowledges Gabriel by name, to his confused surprise. Police raid the house, and Doe is killed.

The subsequent investigation reveals that Doe bugged her own residence to record conversations with Special Branch members and glean classified information. The tapes reveal that Police Commissioner Eugene Igoe divulged sensitive information about the aliens' arrival to Soldier Field which allowed Phoenix to develop their attack strategy. Igoe, along with Rafe and many others, are deported off-world and Mulligan, declaring the Chicago threat neutralized, is promoted to Acting Commissioner.

Mulligan meets with Gabriel privately, with Gabriel lamenting that Rafe's plan failed. Mulligan, retrieving a box earlier received from Doe, reveals a BlackBerry phone, giving the memory card to Gabriel and suggesting that maybe failure was the plan. Gabriel reviews the card’s contents — a video depicting his own baby shower, and revealing Jane Doe taught at the same school as his mother. It was at the shower that she was introduced to Mulligan, with several Phoenix members present, and the video closes with Mulligan leaving a message for Gabriel, inspiring him to carry the torch of Phoenix.

Meanwhile, Mulligan is cleared to meet underground with the Legislators. As he descends, the invisible substance of the powerful alien explosive envelops him, indicating he is part of the resistance and that the whole 'failed' plan was orchestrated to allow him to deal a fatal blow to the Legislators.

During the credits, a map details that the Chicago Closed Zone was successfully destroyed, with other resistance strikes and protests having broken out in cities all over the world, indicating that the opening exhortation to "light a match and ignite a war" has led humanity to attempt to overthrow their alien oppressors.

== Cast ==
- John Goodman as Detective William Mulligan
- Ashton Sanders as Gabriel Drummond
- Jonathan Majors as Rafe Drummond, infamous insurgent
- Colson Baker as Jurgis, Gabriel's friend
- Vera Farmiga as Jane Doe / Priscilla Scott
- Alan Ruck as Charles Rittenhouse, an insurgent
- Kevin Dunn as Police Commissioner Eugene Igoe
- David J. Height as Master of Ceremonies
- Madeline Brewer as Rula, Gabriel's girlfriend
- James Ransone as Patrick Ellison, an insurgent
- Yasen Peyankov as Ivan Leviev, the hacker
- Rene L. Moreno as Raul Casillas, the courier
- Avery Lee as Harrison Ma, the surgeon
- Caitlin Ewald as Anita Hölderlin, a driver for the Union Day attack
- Ben Daniels as Daniel Larkin, a co-ordinator for the Union Day attack
- Lawrence Grimm as Evan Hayes, a driver for the Union Day attack
- Guy Van Swearingen as Eddie the Priest, a co-ordinator for the Union Day attack
- Chronicle Ganawah as Michael Posner, a driver for the Union Day attack
- Eric C. Lynch as Nelson Macauley, the morgue attendant
- D. B. Sweeney as Levitt
- Kevin J. O'Connor as Kermode
- KiKi Layne as Carrie, a drug dealer
- Marc Grapey as Mayor Ed Lee

== Production ==
On August 24, 2016, it was announced that Rupert Wyatt would direct a science fiction film titled Captive State, from a screenplay he had written with his wife Erica Beeney. Later that month, it was reported that Participant Media had won a heated bidding war for the rights to the film and would produce alongside Amblin Partners. Focus Features would distribute the film domestically and Entertainment One is distributing in other markets, including Canada, the United Kingdom, New Zealand, and Australia.

In November 2016, John Goodman signed to star in the film. The following month, Ashton Sanders joined the cast. Vera Farmiga, Machine Gun Kelly, and newcomer Jonathan Majors joined the cast on January 25, 2017. On February 2, 2017, Kevin Dunn was cast in a supporting role. Madeline Brewer was added as a love interest of Sanders' character on February 21, 2017. In March 2017, Ben Daniels confirmed his casting via his Twitter account.

Principal photography began on February 15, 2017, in Chicago, Illinois. Production was primarily based at Cinespace Chicago Film Studios, and a large amount of filming took place in the Lower West Side neighborhood of Pilsen. In March 2017, production spent two days on location in Edgewater, Chicago.

Machine Gun Kelly sustained a hairline fracture on set toward the end of filming, reportedly from repeated punches to the chest from an unnamed person playing a police officer. The actor stated that when he complained to a crew member about the incident, he was told to "suck it up."

== Music ==
In March 2018, it was reported that Rob Simonsen would compose the film's score. A soundtrack album was released on compact disc by Sony Classical, and digitally by Masterworks.

== Release ==
Captive State was released in the United States on March 15, 2019, by Focus Features. It was originally scheduled to be released on August 17, 2018, but was pushed back to March 29, 2019, before finally being moved up two weeks to its current release date.

The film's UK theatrical release was cancelled shortly before its set date of March 29, 2019. Wyatt has claimed that local distributor, Entertainment One, refused to tell him why they pulled the release. The film was finally released in the UK on digital platforms on March 8, 2021.

== Reception ==
=== Box office ===
In the United States and Canada, Captive State was released alongside Wonder Park and Five Feet Apart, and was projected to gross around $5 million from 2,200 theaters in its opening weekend. The film made $1.3 million on its first day, including $300,000 from Thursday night previews. It debuted to $3.1 million, finishing seventh. Ultimately, the film was a box office bomb, grossing only $9.4 million worldwide against a $25 million budget.

=== Critical response ===
On review aggregation website Rotten Tomatoes, the film holds an approval rating of 42% based on 79 reviews, with an average score of 5.4/10. The website's critical consensus reads, "This sci-fi thriller may not necessarily leave viewers in a Captive State, but it offers reasonably diverting alien invasion action with ambitious political undertones." On Metacritic, the film has a weighted average score of 54 out of 100, based on 19 critics, indicating "mixed or average" reviews. Audiences polled by CinemaScore gave the film an average grade of "C−" on an A+ to F scale, and filmgoers at PostTrak gave it 2 out of 5 stars.

In a middling review for The A.V. Club, A.A. Dowd wrote "It's not unreasonable to expect something like excitement out of a story about freedom fighters plotting to take back the planet. Captive State does not clear that fairly low bar." Frank Scheck of The Hollywood Reporter gave the film a negative review, describing it as "[v]isually murky, choppily edited and lacking both narrative clarity and well-defined characterizations," while the Los Angeles Times's Gary Goldstein was also critical of the film, writing: "In Captive State aliens have taken over the world (as they will), but it's the viewers stuck watching this messy, lugubrious sci-fi thriller who may feel like the ones being held captive."
