= Anna Shechtman =

American journalist and crossword constructor

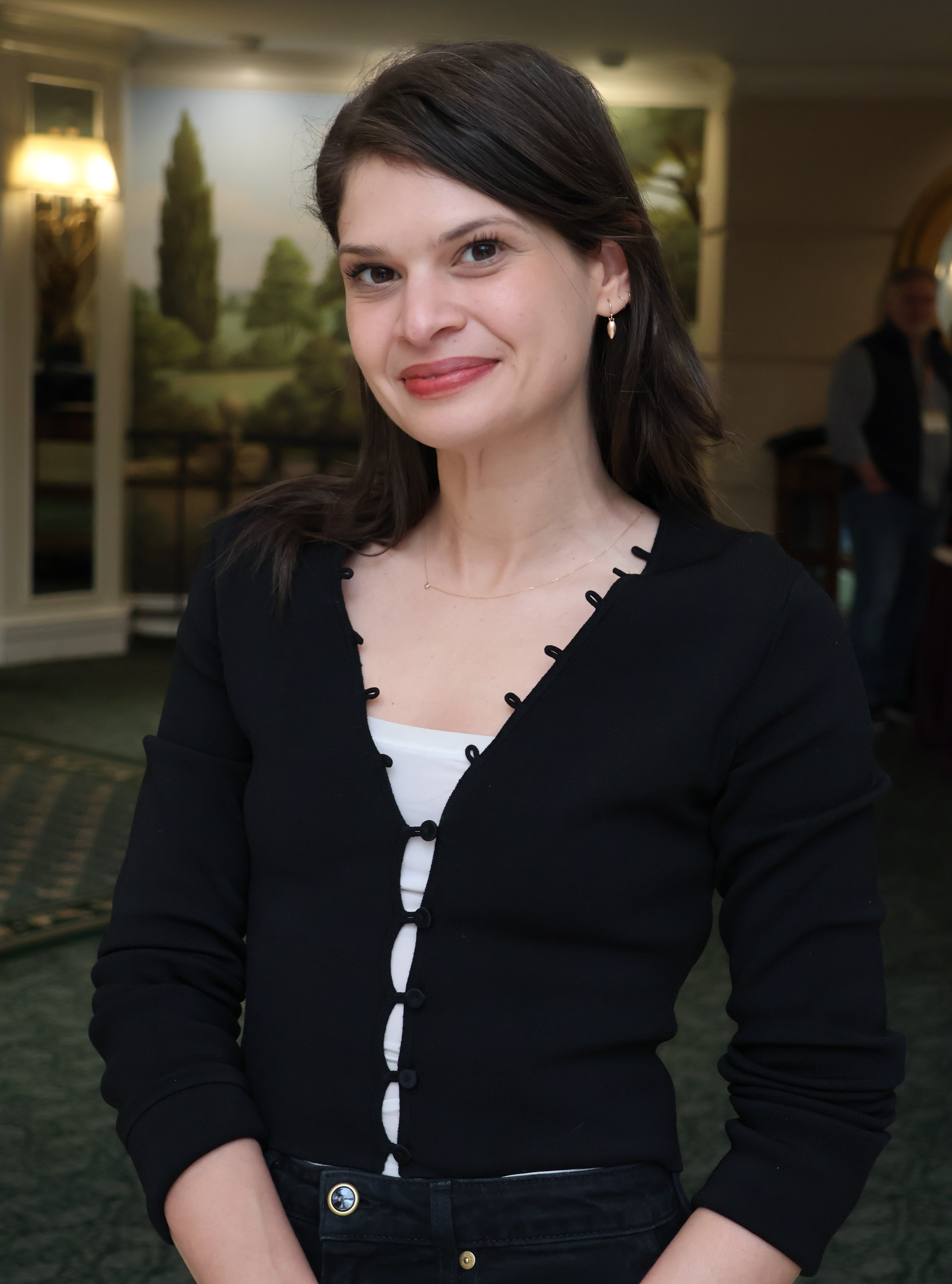
- Shechtman in 2024
- Born: August 30, 1990 (age 35)
- Education: Swarthmore College; Yale University
- Occupations: Critic and crossword constructor

Anna Shechtman (born 1990) is an American critic and crossword constructor. Shechtman is an assistant professor of Literatures in English at Cornell University and critic who constructs crossword puzzles for The New Yorker and The New York Times. She is an editor-at-large at the Los Angeles Review of Books.

== Early life ==
Shechtman grew up in a Jewish family in New York City's Tribeca neighborhood. She earned her bachelor's degree from Swarthmore College. In 2020 she received her PhD in English literature and film and media studies from Yale University.

== Career ==
Shechtman writes film criticism for the New York Review of Books, oftentimes with literary and film critic D.A. Miller

=== Crosswords ===
Shechtman was 19 when her first crossword appeared in the New York Times. Until she was 25, she created most of her puzzles by hand using graph paper and dictionaries rather than crossword software. Shechtman is the second youngest female crossword creator to be published in the New York Times. After graduating college, Will Shortz asked Shechtman to be his assistant at the New York Times.

In May 2019, The Guardian called her "the new queen of crosswords".

=== Book publication ===
Shechtman's book The Riddles of the Sphinx: Inheriting the Feminist History of the Crossword Puzzle was published on March 5, 2024. The book presents overlapping histories of the crossword and US feminism, arguing that the experience of gender is lived in language. The female constructors covered in the book adopted a formal, sometimes rigid relationship to language to negotiate lives under patriarchy. Some were self-identified conservatives; some were avowed feminists. All shared a preoccupation with word puzzles and an oftentimes punishing relationship to their bodies and the body of language. One figure highlighted in the book is Margaret Farrar, the first editor of crossword puzzles for the New York Times.

== Bibliography ==
- "Black-and-white thinking : the power and pleasure of the grid". Personal History. The New Yorker. Vol. 97, no. 31. December 27, 2021. pp. 20–24. (Note: Online version is titled "Escaping into the crossword puzzle".)
- The riddles of the Sphinx : inheriting the feminist history of the crossword puzzle. HarperOne. 2024.
