= Native Son (1986 film) =

1986 film directed by Jerrold Freedman

- Theatrical release poster
- Directed by: Jerrold Freedman
- Written by: Richard Wesley
- Based on: Native Son by Richard Wright
- Produced by: Diane Silver
- Starring: Carroll Baker; Matt Dillon; Oprah Winfrey; Elizabeth McGovern; Geraldine Page
- Cinematography: Thomas Burstyn
- Edited by: Aaron Stell
- Music by: James Mtume
- Distributed by: Cinecom Pictures
- Release date: December 12, 1986 (US)
- Running time: 111 minutes
- Country: United States
- Language: English
- Budget: $2 million
- Box office: $1.3 million

Native Son is a 1986 American drama film directed by Jerrold Freeman, and starring Carroll Baker, Victor Love, Matt Dillon and Oprah Winfrey. The film is based on the 1940 novel Native Son, written by Richard Wright.

== Plot ==
Set in Chicago in the 1930s, Bigger Thomas, an African American who lives in an impoverished neighborhood, is employed by a prosperous white family who live in the suburbs of a major city. The money Bigger makes at his new job will be used to supplement his mother's income. As a chauffeur, he is directed by the father of the family to take Mary, the daughter, to the university. Instead, Mary decides to pick up her Socialist boyfriend, Jan, and to spend the time drinking and partying.

Jan and Mary portray a young liberal couple who venture into a black neighborhood with Bigger for the sole purpose of being entertained at Ernie's, a black nightclub. On the way home, Mary becomes inebriated and Bigger must get her to her bedroom without being detected. Mary's mother, who is blind, enters the room and Bigger panics at the thought of being caught with a white woman. He accidentally kills Mary by placing a pillow over her head to keep her quiet. Still frightened, Bigger disposes of the body in the furnace, possibly because he feels he would not get a fair trial for the accidental death of a white woman. Meanwhile, Jan is wanted by the police for Mary's murder and Bigger plays a role in the accusations against him.

== Cast ==
- Carroll Baker as Mrs. Dalton
- Akosua Busia as Bessie
- Matt Dillon as Jan Erlone
- Art Evans as Doc
- John Karlen as Max
- Victor Love as Bigger Thomas
- Elizabeth McGovern as Mary Dalton
- John McMartin as Mr. Dalton
- Geraldine Page as Peggy
- Willard E. Pugh as Gus
- David Rasche as Buckley
- Ving Rhames as Jack
- Lane Smith as Britton
- Oprah Winfrey as Mrs. Thomas

== Development ==
Richard Wesley wrote the script. According to Judith Michaelson of the Los Angeles Times, not only was the violence reduced, but the emphasis on Communism was also "muted" compared to the book.

Victor Love stated that his appearance and voice not being "street" meant that he did not feel he was initially seriously considered for the role. He was auditioning for Othello, which he did not get, when he was called to perform as Bigger. Love felt that Wright did not really mean for Bigger Thomas to be played unsympathetically and that instead he was afraid to ask people to care for Bigger. According to Love the filmmakers initially refused him the role, but later offered it to him.

According to Julia Wright, the daughter of Richard Wright, there were shoots depicting Bessie's death, but the filmmakers did not complete a shoot that they liked. The film producers ultimately removed the murder of Bessie to make the protagonist more sympathetic to audiences. Freeman opposed this and argued that this interfered with how the character becomes increasingly damaged in the source work. Freeman stated "The scene is pivotal in the novel because it underscores the disintegration of Bigger Thomas, a victim of racism and segregation in Chicago of the 1930's who in turn becomes a victimizer." Producer Diane Silver argued in favor of the change, stating "The angst that worked in the book was impossible to put on the screen." American Playhouse producer Lindsay Law also supported the change arguing that an audience would disengage from the character if he kills Bessie and that "The book had more layers than you could explore in a two-hour film." Julia Wright argued that the performance of Love meant that the murder scene was not necessary.

== Reception ==
On Rotten Tomatoes the film has an approval rating of 50% based on reviews from 10 critics.

Vincent Canby of The New York Times wrote that the character of Bigger was acted "in such a passive way that [he] never appears capable of taking charge of his own destiny, which is at the heart of Wright's terrifying fable." Canby also stated that he preferred the "skin-deep" characters in the minor roles, with Mary being "excellent", and the performances of Bessie, Mary's parents, the maid, and the prosecutor as "Equally effective, and equally one-dimensional". However he felt this Jan "looks too young and too picturesque to fit easily into Wright's world." Canby wrote that the story from the original work had "been so softened that it almost seems upbeat, which would have infuriated Wright."

Kevin Thomas of the Los Angeles Times stated that the film had "vibrant performances", with praise in particular for Love's acting, but he felt that the film became "plodding", especially after the death scene of Mary; Thomas also argued the film was less impactful due to not having Bessie's murder nor having a lot of "insight into the psychology of black rage".

Anna Shechtman of The New Yorker wrote that "The character of Bessie barely registers in the movie at all." Aljean Harmetz of The New York Times concurs, stating that "the character [...] has been almost completely trimmed out."

Rita Kempley of the Washington Post criticized the "melodrama and speechy, preachy dialogue" and concluded that it "is as worthy as it is self-righteous." Kempley praised the performances of Love and Winfrey.

Patrick Reardon of the Chicago Tribune praised the film, arguing that its message was still valuable in the 1980s.

Julia Wright had a positive reception to the 1986 film, arguing there was "honesty and respect" for the book, and in particular praising Love's acting.

In 2019, Todd McCarthy of The Hollywood Reporter wrote that the film was "Little remarked".
