= Jackie Chan Stunt Team =

Group of stuntmen who work alongside Jackie Chan

- Born: Hong Kong
- Occupations: Actors, action directors, stuntmen
- Years active: 1976–present
- Awards: Hong Kong Film Awards – Best Action Choreography; 1985 Project A 1986 Police Story; 1988 Project A Part II; 1989 Police Story 2; 1990 Miracles; 1995 Drunken Master II; 2002 The Accidental Spy Golden Horse Awards – Best Action Choreography; 1994 Drunken Master II; 1995 Thunderbolt; 1997 Mr. Nice Guy; 1998 Who Am I? 2004 New Police Story

Chinese name
Transcriptions
Standard Mandarin
- Hanyu Pinyin: Chéng Jiā Bān
Yue: Cantonese
- Jyutping: Sing4 Gaa1 Baan1

The Jackie Chan Stunt Team (Chinese: 成家班; Cantonese Yale: Sing Ga Ban; lit. 'Chan's Family Group'), also known as Jackie Chan's Stuntmen Association, is a group of stuntmen and martial artists who work alongside Jackie Chan. Founded in the 1970s, it originally included Hong Kong action stuntmen and martial artists, before expanding to include international talent over the next several decades.

== History ==
The JC Stunt Team was established in 1976 and originated from the relationships Chan formed in his early starring roles in Hong Kong action movies. Several of his co-stars and stuntmen hired by the film studios began working together regularly. This engendered a familiarity of one another's skills and abilities and it made sense for them to become a working team. Some of the members had received training at the Peking Opera schools, similar to Chan.

By 1983, and the release of the film Project A, the stunt team had become an official organisation of six members. The organisation meant that the stuntmen not only received insurance coverage (though they were eventually blacklisted by all insurance companies in Hong Kong due to the increasing danger of their stunt work), but also a monthly salary and higher pay. By the time of Police Story 2 in 1988, the team had expanded to around twenty members. This incarnation of the team was disbanded in 1990 and thereafter, individual members were contracted and used on a film-by-film basis rather than all members remaining on the payroll. This allowed for some new faces, and the return of former members.

The formation of Chan's team influenced others in the film industry to follow suit, particularly his former co-stars and "brothers" Sammo Hung and Yuen Biao (their stunt teams known as "Hung Ga Ban" and "Yuen Ga Ban" respectively). Other actors who formed their own stunt teams include Lau Kar-leung, Philip Ko, Stanley Tong and Bruce Law. Chan's stunt team worked in collaboration with Sammo Hung's team on films like Dragons Forever, Thunderbolt and Around the World in 80 Days. A small number of films that Chan produced but did not appear in, or was not involved in at all, have utilised his stunt team. These include The Gold Hunters (1981), Rouge (1988), The Inspector Wears Skirts 2 (1989), Stage Door Johnny (1990) and Angry Ranger (1991).

== Members (past and present) ==
These are former and current members of Chan's stunt team. Where possible, the films they have worked on are included.

- Wong Yiu - co-founder of the team in 1977 - The Fearless Hyena, Dragon Fist, Dance of Death, Spiritual Kung Fu, Half a Loaf of Kung Fu
- Peng Kang - co-founder of the team in 1977 - Spiritual Kung Fu, Half a Loaf of Kung Fu, The Fearless Hyena, Dragon Fist, The Fearless Hyena Part II
- Brad Allan (Bradley James Allan) – First ever non-Asian member of the team - Mr. Nice Guy, Who Am I?, Jackie Chan: My Stunts, Gorgeous, Shanghai Noon, The Accidental Spy, Rush Hour 2, The Tuxedo, Shanghai Knights, The Medallion, New Police Story, Rush Hour 3, Armour Of God 3: Chinese Zodiac, Shang-Chi and the Legend of the Ten Rings.
- Paul Andreovski – Mr. Nice Guy, Who Am I?, Shanghai Noon, The Accidental Spy, Rush Hour 2, The Tuxedo, Shanghai Knights, The Medallion, Around the World in 80 Days, The Spy Next Door. Chan's personal boxing coach.
- Lee Huang (Konstantin Widjaja) - Bleeding Steel, Project X (SNAFU), Kung Fu Yoga
- Andy Owen (Andrew Owen) – Rush Hour 3
- Andy Long (Andreas Nguyen) – Armour Of God 3: Chinese Zodiac, Police Story 2013, Dragon Blade
- Vi-Dan Tran – The Foreigner, Bleeding Steel
- Yamson Domingo – Police Story, Thunderbolt
- Anthony Carpio (Go Shut-Fung) – Armour of God, Project A Part II, Police Story 2 Miracles, Twin Dragons, Drunken Master II, Thunderbolt, Jackie Chan: My Stunts, The Accidental Spy, The Medallion, New Police Story, Rob-B-Hood
- Chris Chan (Chan Sai-Tang) – Project A Part II, Police Story 2, Miracles, Twin Dragons, City Hunter, Crime Story, The Accidental Spy
- Chan Siu-wah - Thunderbolt, The Accidental Spy
- Chan Man-ching – Dragons Forever, Police Story 3: Supercop, Drunken Master II, Rumble in the Bronx, Thunderbolt, Police Story 4: First Strike, Mr. Nice Guy, Rush Hour, Who Am I?, Jackie Chan: My Stunts, Gorgeous, The Accidental Spy, Rob-B-Hood
- Chan Tat-kwong (Chan Daat-Gong) – Project A, Police Story, Armour of God, Project A Part II, Police Story 2, Dragons Forever, Miracles, Twin Dragons, Crime Story, Drunken Master II, Thunderbolt, The Medallion, New Police Story, Rob-B-Hood
- Chan Wai-to - Police Story 4: First Strike
- Don L. Lee, The Spy Next Door, V8 commercial advertisements.
- Andy Cheng (Cheng Kai-Chung) – Mr. Nice Guy, Who Am I?, Jackie Chan: My Stunts, Rush Hour, Shanghai Noon, Rush Hour 2, The Tuxedo
- Johnny Cheung (Cheung Yiu-Wah) – Dragon Lord, Project A, The Protector, Police Story, Armour of God, Project A Part II, Dragons Forever, Police Story 2, Miracles, Twin Dragons, Crime Story, Drunken Master II, Rush Hour, Who Am I?, Jackie Chan: My Stunts, Around the World in 80 Days, Rob-B-Hood
- Danny Chow (Chow Yun-kin) – Dragon Lord, Police Story, Project A Part II, Dragons Forever, Miracles
- Joe Eigo – The Medallion, Around the World in 80 Days
- Fung Hak-on (Fung Hark-On) – Snake in the Eagle's Shadow, The Young Master, Winners and Sinners, Heart of Dragon, The Protector, Police Story, Dragons Forever, Miracles, Twin Dragons
- Hon Chun – Project A Part II, Thunderbolt, Rob-B-Hood
- Dani Hu (Fok Chan Keung) – The Protector, Police Story
- Louis Keung (Mak Wai-Cheung) – Heart of the Dragon, Miracles, Police Story 3: Supercop, Thunderbolt, Jackie Chan: My Stunts, Gorgeous, The Medallion
- Benny Lai (Lai Keung-Kuen) – The Young Master, Dragon Lord, Project A, Wheels on Meals, Police Story, Armour of God, Project A Part II, Police Story 2, Dragons Forever, Miracles, Operation Condor, Twin Dragons, Rumble in the Bronx, Thunderbolt, The Accidental Spy, Rush Hour 2
- Rocky Lai (Lai Keung-Kun) – Project A, Police Story, Armour of God, Project A Part II, Dragons Forever, Police Story 2, Miracles, Twin Dragons, Police Story 3: Supercop, Drunken Master II, Thunderbolt, Rumble in the Bronx, Police Story 4: First Strike, Mr. Nice Guy, Who Am I?, Jackie Chan: My Stunts, Gorgeous, The Accidental Spy, The Medallion, Rob-B-Hood
- Sam Wong (Lai Sing-kwong / Wong Ming-Sing) – Project A, Police Story, Armour of God, Project A Part II, Police Story 2, Miracles, Police Story 3: Supercop, City Hunter, Crime Story, Drunken Master II, Thunderbolt, Rumble in the Bronx, Who Am I?, Rush Hour, Jackie Chan: My Stunts, Gorgeous, The Accidental Spy. Stunt Team Leader.
- Ben Lam (Lam Kwok-Bun) – Heart of Dragon, Police Story, Project A Part II, Police Story 2
- Chris Li (Lee Kin Sang) – Project A, Police Story, Project A Part II, Police Story 2, Miracles, Twin Dragons, Drunken Master II
- Lee Chun-kit – Project A Part II, Police Story 2, Miracles, Around the World in 80 Days
- Nicky Li (Li Chung-Chi) – Project A, Armour of God, Project A Part II, Dragons Forever, Miracles, Twin Dragons, Crime Story, Drunken Master II, Thunderbolt, Rumble in the Bronx, Mr. Nice Guy, Rush Hour, Who Am I?, Shanghai Noon, Rush Hour 2, The Tuxedo, Shanghai Knights, The Medallion, Around the World in 80 Days, New Police Story, Rob-B-Hood. Stunt Team Leader.
- Ken Lo (Lo Wai-Kwong) – Project A Part II, Police Story 2, Miracles, Operation Condor, City Hunter, Police Story 3: Supercop, Crime Story, Drunken Master II, Thunderbolt, Police Story 4: First Strike, Who Am I?, Rush Hour, Jackie Chan: My Stunts, Gorgeous, Rush Hour 2, Shanghai Knights, Around the World in 80 Days, New Police Story, The Myth, Rob-B-Hood, Armour Of God 3: Chinese Zodiac. Also known for working as Chan's personal bodyguard.
- Mars (Chiang Wing-fat / Feng Sing) – The Young Master, Dragon Lord, Winners and Sinners, Project A, Wheels on Meals, The Protector, Police Story, Armour of God, Project A Part II, Dragons Forever, Police Story 2, Miracles, Operation Condor, Police Story 3: Supercop, Twin Dragons, Crime Story, Drunken Master II, Thunderbolt, Police Story 4: First Strike, Rumble in the Bronx, Mr. Nice Guy, Rush Hour, Gorgeous, Jackie Chan: My Stunts, Rush Hour 2, Shanghai Knights, Around the World in 80 Days, New Police Story.
- Max Huang (Huang You Liang) – Armour Of God 3: Chinese Zodiac, Police Story 2013
- Jack Wong (Wong Wai-Leung) – Jackie Chan: My Stunts, The Accidental Spy, Around the World in 80 Days, New Police Story, Rob-B-Hood
- Pang Hiu-sang – Police Story
- Frankie Poon (Poon Bin-chung) – Project A, Project A Part II
- William Tuen (Tuan Wai-Lun) – City Hunter, Police Story 3: Supercop, Crime Story, Drunken Master II, Thunderbolt, Rush Hour, Gorgeous, Rush Hour 2
- Wan Faat – Snake in the Monkey's Shadow, Project A, The Protector, Police Story, Project A Part II, Dragons Forever, Police Story 2, Miracles, Operation Condor, Twin Dragons, Crime Story, Drunken Master II
- Paul Wong (Wong Kwan) – The Young Master, Dragon Lord, Winners and Sinners, The Protector, Police Story
- Jon Foo (Jonathan Patrick Foo) – The Myth
- Peng Zhang – Rush Hour 3
- Wong Wai Fai - Rush Hour 2
- He Jun (Hoh Gwan) – The Tuxedo, Shanghai Knights, The Medallion, Around The World In 80 Days, New Police Story, The Myth, Rob-B-Hood, The Spy Next Door, Armour Of God 3: Chinese Zodiac, Police Story 2013
- Gang Wu (Ng Kong) – Shanghai Noon, Rush Hour 2, The Tuxedo, Shanghai Knights, The Medallion, Around the World in 80 Days, New Police Story, The Myth, Rob-B-Hood, Rush Hour 3, The Spy Next Door, The Karate Kid, Armour Of God 3: Chinese Zodiac
- Park Hyun Jin – Rush Hour 2, The Tuxedo, Shanghai Knights, The Medallion, Around the World in 80 Days, New Police Story, The Myth, Rob-B-Hood, Rush Hour 3, The Spy Next Door
- Lee In Seob – The Tuxedo, Shanghai Knights, The Medallion, Around the World in 80 Days, New Police Story, The Myth, Rob-B-Hood, Rush Hour 3, Armour Of God 3: Chinese Zodiac
- Han Kwan Hua (Han Guan Hua) – Shanghai Knights, The Medallion, New Police Story, Around the World in 80 Days, The Myth, Rob-B-Hood, Rush Hour 3, The Spy Next Door, Armour Of God 3: Chinese Zodiac
- Temur Mamisashvili - Skiptrace, Kung Fu Yoga, Bleeding Steel
- Allen Sit - Police Story 3: Supercop, Police Story 4: First Strike, Rumble in the Bronx, Thunderbolt
- Ho Sung-pak - Drunken Master II
- Shashwad Babalgaon - Expend4bles,
- Kenya Sawada - Thunderbolt
- Chu Tau - Thunderbolt, The Medallion
- Tang Chiu-yau - Police Story 4: First Strike, The Accidental Spy
- Kwan Yung - Who Am I?, Rush Hour, The Accidental Spy
- Tom Wu - Shanghai Knights
- Russ Price – Who Am I?
- Fan Xiaoshuang – Kung Fu Yoga, Spider-Man: Brand New Day

== Awards and nominations ==
- 2001 Taurus World Stunt Awards
  - Nominated: Shanghai Noon
- 2002 Taurus World Stunt Awards
  - Won: Rush Hour 2
- 2004 Taurus World Stunt Awards
  - Nominated: Shanghai Knights
- 2008 Taurus World Stunt Awards
  - Nominated: Rush Hour 3
