= The Medallion =

2003 Hong Kong-American film by Gordon Chan

- Theatrical release poster
- Directed by: Gordon Chan
- Written by: Bennett Joshua Davlin; Alfred Cheung; Gordon Chan; Bey Logan; Paul Wheeler
- Produced by: Alfred Cheung
- Starring: Jackie Chan; Lee Evans; Claire Forlani; Julian Sands; John Rhys-Davies; Anthony Wong; Christy Chung
- Cinematography: Arthur Wong
- Edited by: Don Brochu; Chan Ki-hop
- Music by: Adrian Lee
- Production company: Emperor Multimedia Group
- Distributed by: TriStar Pictures (Theatrical); Screen Gems (Home Video)
- Release dates: 15 August 2003 (Hong Kong); 22 August 2003 (United States)
- Running time: 88 minutes
- Countries: Hong Kong; United States
- Language: English
- Budget: $35–41 million
- Box office: $34.3 million

The Medallion (Chinese: 飛龍再生/免死金牌) is a 2003 buddy action comedy film directed by Hong Kong film director Gordon Chan, who also wrote the screenplay with Bennett Joshua Davlin, Bey Logan, Paul Wheeler, and Alfred Cheung, who also produced.

The film stars Jackie Chan, Lee Evans, Claire Forlani, and Julian Sands. It was much less successful than Chan's other American films such as the Rush Hour film series, Shanghai Noon, and its sequel, Shanghai Knights. The film was theatrically released on 15th August 2003 in Hong Kong and 22 August 2003 in the United States by TriStar Pictures. However, on the home media release, it was released by Screen Gems.

In the film, Eddie (Jackie Chan) is a Hong Kong police officer hired by Interpol to capture a crime lord known as Snakehead (Sands) and stop him from kidnapping a chosen boy with special powers and a medallion that gives superhuman power and immortality.

Much of the film features supernatural and mystical themes, though it is filled with action and comedy. The film received negative reviews from critics. Even though the film's United States box office result was strong enough for Sony/TriStar Pictures to make profit, the film performed poorly at the worldwide box-office, and only grossed $34.3 million in worldwide box office against $35‒41 million production budget.

== Plot ==
Eddie Yang is a Hong Kong police inspector cooperating with Interpol in the capture of a crime lord named AJ "Snakehead" Staul. Snakehead procures an ancient book from a Chinese bookstore keeper, which tells the story of a boy chosen every thousand years to bind the two halves of a legendary medallion. In Hong Kong, Eddie and Interpol agent Arthur Watson led a raid to capture Snakehead and his men, who were about to kidnap the boy named Jai. Eddie and the agents fight off Snakehead's men, infiltrating the temple containing Jai. The agents save Jai, but Snakehead eludes them. Two weeks later, Snakehead captures Jai aboard a cargo boat in Hong Kong. Eddie and a team of Hong Kong police engage and defeat several of Snakehead's men, but some of them escape with Jai to Dublin, Ireland.

In Ireland, Eddie was assigned to help Interpol with the investigation, much to Watson's annoyance. Eddie also reunites with his girlfriend, Nicole James. By chance, Eddie later encounters and apprehends one of Snakehead's top men, who confesses that Jai got held in the harbor. Eddie, Watson, and Nicole move to rescue Jai, defeating several of Snakehead's men. Eddie and Jai end up trapped inside a container, which is then knocked into the water by one of Snakehead's men before they can be released. Eddie manages to keep Jai alive by finding an inflatable tent and securely putting Jai inside there, but Eddie suddenly dies from drowning. After being saved, Jai uses his medallion on Eddie's body.

In the morgue, Watson grieves over Eddie's body and prepares to say his last words, but Eddie appears beside him. Eddie finds out that Jai used the medallion to bring him back to life, and his former body vanishes into dust. Jai splits the medallion into its two halves, giving one of them to Eddie. Snakehead's men appear in the hospital to recapture Jai, and during the fight, Eddie discovers the medallion has also granted him superhuman strength and immortality.

Nicole looks after Jai, but he is captured again by one of Snakehead's men. At his castle hideout, Snakehead forces Jai to activate the medallion so he can gain its power with only one-half of it; Snakehead only gains superhuman strength and remains mortal. To steal the other half, Snakehead and his men attack Watson's family. Watson's Chinese wife reveals herself to be a police operative like him, much to Watson's surprise, as he kept his job secret from his family. Together, they fight off the attack from Snakehead's men.

Eddie, Watson, and Nicole learn the location of Snakehead's castle lair and go to finish him once and for all. The operation runs smoothly, but Snakehead kills Nicole and becomes immortal. He and Eddie engage in a vicious fight until Eddie uses the medallion to take away the life it gave, leading to the serpent and fish from the medallion appearing and bringing Snakehead, which traps him in the medallion. Jai allows Eddie to use the medallion to resurrect Nicole, who gains super-strength and immortality. The two then run in superhuman speed into the distance as Jai enters another dimension through a portal, scaring Watson.

== Cast ==
- Jackie Chan as Inspector Eddie Yang
- Lee Evans as Interpol Inspector Arthur Watson
- Claire Forlani as Inspector Nicole James
- Alex Bao as Jai
- Julian Sands as A.J. "Snakehead" Staul
- Johann Myers as Giscard
- John Rhys-Davies as Commander Hammerstock-Smythe
- Anthony Wong as Lester Wong, Snakehead's assistant
- Christy Chung as Charlotte Watson
- Billy Hill as Miles Watson
- Nicholas Tse as the waiter at the restaurant (cameo)
- Edison Chen as the waiter at the restaurant (cameo)

=== Snakehead's henchmen ===
- Scott Adkins
- Bruce Khan
- Han Guan Hua
- Paul Andreovski
- Nicola Berwick
- Reuben Langdon (credited as Reuben Christopher Langdon)
- Hiro Hayama (credited as Hiroyoshi Komuro)
- Mark Strange (credited as Michael Strange)
- Matt Routledge (credited as Matthew James Routledge)
- Chris Torres (uncredited)
- Brad Allan (uncredited)
- Jude Poyer (uncredited)

== Production ==
With a projected budget of $35 million, the film was at the time the most expensive Hong Kong production ever, making Bennett Joshua Davlin the highest paid screenwriter in Asia.

=== Original plot and conception ===
Highbinders was the film's working title. In the original plot, those who were given power by the medallion became Highbinders, and Snakehead's goal was to create a Highbinder army at his disposal.

According to the editors' commentary, The Medallion wasn't American-made. However, Columbia-TriStar bought the distribution and editing rights worldwide except in Japan, France, and Hong Kong (but these three countries retain the American cut of the film, the only cut ever made). The original cut was meant to be around 108 minutes. The plot of the film explained Snakehead's crime syndicate of human smuggling, the deaths that occurred from it, and his desire to create an army of Highbinders to aid his organization. These details were all cut to focus on the medallion. As a result of several scene cuts, some original dialogue was overdubbed, including a small amount of Cantonese dialogue.

Over 20 minutes of these deleted scenes can be viewed on the U.S. DVD. Among these scenes are alternate endings where Eddie prevents Nicole's death, an extended fight sequence between Eddie and Snakehead's men, and an alternate ending to the chase sequence between Eddie and Giscard.

=== Filming ===
Filming took place in August 2001 in Dublin, Ireland. Production took a break while Jackie Chan shot 'The Tuxedo', and production resumed in Asia later that year. Filming took place in Dublin Castle, and in the Wicklow countryside. The filmmakers had initially planned to shoot scenes in Australia, but were convinced to film in Dublin instead.

== Reception ==
=== Box office ===
In its US release, The Medallion was No. 5 at the box office on its opening weekend and fell steadily lower during its 10-week release. Overall, it has earned $22.2 million, ranking No. 42 among all martial arts films released in the US and eighth among the Jackie Chan films distributed in the US. The US box office performance had exceeded Sony/TriStar Pictures' profitability target ('mid-teens' box office target).

=== Critical response ===
The film received generally negative reviews from critics. On Rotten Tomatoes the film has a rating of 17% based on reviews from 125 critics. The site's consensus states: "The use of special effects diminishes some of Chan's appeal in this disposable picture." On Metacritic the film has a score of 38% based on reviews from 30 critics, indicating "generally unfavorable reviews". Audiences surveyed by CinemaScore gave the film a grade B.

- Mick LaSalle, San Francisco Chronicle: "The best of Jackie Chan's American movies, a pleasant little action comedy that makes one wonder how other filmmakers could ever get it wrong."
- Roger Ebert, Chicago Sun-Times: "A disposable entertainment, redeemed by silliness, exaggeration, and Chan's skill and charm. I would not want to see it twice, but I liked seeing it once." Ebert called it an improvement over The Tuxedo but not as good as Shanghai Knights.
- Steven Rea, Philadelphia Inquirer: "Chan's signature mix of screwball comedy and gymnastic derring-do landed him his own cartoon series a few years back, and The Medallion -- with its bumbling spies and bounding star -- is about as cartoonish as live action gets."
- Dennis Harvey, Variety: "At times plays as if it were aimed at children, but more often simply seems to be aiming blind at whatever genre cliche the five credited writers fix upon in any given scene."
- Wesley Morris, Boston Globe: "Moves from cheekiness to ineptitude, often in a single take."
- Jami Bernard, New York Daily News: "Evans fumbles through painfully extended homophobic jokes, weak double entendres and agonizingly contorted double-takes."
- Marc Savlov, Austin Chronicle: "One of the Peking Opera-trained superstar's most mediocre films, rivaling last year's God-awful The Tuxedo for sheer messy filmmaking and brazen acts of tedium... Abysmal."

=== Accolades ===
- 23rd Hong Kong Film Awards
  - Nomination: Best Action Choreography (Sammo Hung)
  - Nomination: Best Visual Effects (Matthew Gidney)
