= Fan Xiaoshuang =

Chinese stunt performer (born 1995)

- 范小双
- Born: Fan Xiaoshuang; 1995 (age 30–31); Handan, Hebei Province, China
- Occupations: Martial artist; stunt performer
- Years active: 2012–present

Fan Xiaoshuang (Chinese: 范小双; born 1995), also known as Snow Fan, is a Chinese martial artist and stunt performer. She was trained in changquan and became a stunt performer in Hong Kong action cinema, working on films including Monster Hunt (2015), The Mermaid (2016), and Shock Wave (2017). She later expanded her career into Hollywood, serving as a stunt double in the Marvel Cinematic Universe films Shang-Chi and the Legend of the Ten Rings (2021) and The Marvels (2023), before making her acting debut as Snow in Spider-Man: Brand New Day (2026).

== Early life ==
Fan was born in Handan, Hebei Province, China, in 1995, into a family of martial artists. Her family ran a martial arts school, and she began training in fist fighting and swordsmanship at the age of seven. She studied at a sports school in Wu'an, and she won a provincial level championship in changquan and placed third in a gunshu competition. She also attained the Master Athlete grade in wushu, issued by the General Administration of Sport of China.

== Career ==
Fan began working as a stunt performer in the film industry at the age of 17. She worked in Hong Kong action cinema, appearing in the films Painted Skin: The Resurrection, Monster Hunt, The Mermaid, and Shock Wave. She also participated in the Chinese co-produced monster film The Great Wall and action film Kung Fu Yoga.

She later expanded her career into Hollywood, working as the stunt double for Xu Xialing (played by Meng'er Zhang) and Ying Li (played by Fala Chen) in the 2021 Marvel Cinematic Universe (MCU) film Shang-Chi and the Legend of the Ten Rings, for which she performed the tai chi movements for Chen. She returned for another MCU film The Marvels as the stunt double for Kamala Khan (played by Iman Vellani), and worked on Now You See Me: Now You Don't.

In 2024, she joined the Jackie Chan Stunt Team as part of its tenth generation. In 2026, she made her acting debut in the MCU film Spider-Man: Brand New Day, playing Snow, the leader of the ninja monk clan The Hand. As the film's action director Peng Zhang had previously collaborated with the Jackie Chan Stunt Team, she secured an audition through Zhang. She underwent five months of training prior to the shoot to prepare for the three-minute fight sequence at the end of the film, as the scene was filmed mostly with stunt work and minimal CGI.
