= Brad Allan =

Australian martial artist and actor (1973–2021)

- Born: Bradley James Allan; 14 February 1973; Melbourne, Australia
- Died: 7 August 2021 (aged 48)
- Other names: Bai-Hu (White Tiger); Bradley Allan
- Occupations: Action choreographer, actor, stuntman, assistant director, choreographer, stunt co-ordinator, martial artist
- Years active: 1994–2021
- Height: 1.63 m / 5ft 4in
- Awards: 1 won (World Stunt Awards); 3 nominated (Screen Actors Guild Awards)

Bradley James Allan (14 February 1973 – 7 August 2021) was an Australian martial artist, action choreographer, actor, and stunt performer. He worked in the Hong Kong film industry as a member of the Jackie Chan Stunt Team and choreographed action scenes in Hollywood films. He is best known for his role as Alan in the 1999 film Gorgeous.

== Biography ==
Brad Allan began boxing and karate training around age 10. He studied Wushu and gymnastics from age 14, spending two years learning under Beijing Wushu Team members Liang Chang-xing and Tang Lai-wei, compatriots of actor Jet Li. He was also trained in a number of other martial arts including karate, aikido, hapkido, taekwondo, Wing Chun, boxing, and kickboxing. He later spent time at the Shanghai Institute of Sport and learned Mandarin. In 1993, he made his first film appearance in the unofficial sequel film Drunken Master III. He briefly joined the Australian stunt team New Generation Stunts.

He was a member of the Australian team at the fourth World Wushu Championships in Rome, in November 1997. Later that year, he heard Jackie Chan was filming Mr. Nice Guy in Melbourne and knew some of the Australian crew. He was invited to demonstrate his martial arts style for action film director Cho Wing. Allan made a brief appearance in the film and was signed for a role in Chan's next Hong Kong film, Who Am I? (1998), where he would double for Ron Smoorenburg and Michelle Ferre. He was subsequently invited to join Chan's stunt team, 'Sing ga ban', as their first non-Asian member. Allan progressed through the stunt team, and ultimately became team leader.

In the 2000s, in addition to being a member of Chan's stunt team, Allan gained action choreography/direction roles in major Hollywood films including The Chronicles of Riddick and Hellboy II: The Golden Army.

In 2010, Allan teamed up with British director Edgar Wright for the making of Scott Pilgrim vs. the World as second unit director. Allan and his team again teamed up with Wright in 2011 and 2012 for Cuban Fury and The World's End, respectively.

On 7 August 2021, Allan died of an apparent heart attack at the age of 48. News of his death was first announced by Chan on social media. Shang-Chi and the Legend of the Ten Rings, released in September 2021, is dedicated to Allan. His final film, Argylle, released in February 2024, pays tribute to him.

== Filmography ==
=== Television and other work ===
Year	Title	Role	Notes
1998	Raw FM	Jack	ABC TV series (Australian TV)
1998	Good Guys/Bad Guys	Driver	Le Mesurier Films (Australian TV)
1999	Noah's Ark	Stuntman and stuntdouble	
1999	Thunderstone	Stuntdouble	TV series
2000	Saturday Night Live	Opening monologue thug	Episode: "Jackie Chan/Kid Rock"; Uncredited
2002	Mutant X	Computer sparring partner	Episode: "Interface"; Uncredited
2011	Our Deal	Stunt coordinator	Music video director: Drew Barrymore

=== Films ===
Year	Title	Director	Role	Notes
1994	Drunken Master III	Lau Kar-leung	Foreigner on bus	Uncredited
1997	Mr. Nice Guy	Sammo Hung	Stunt performer	Uncredited
1998	Who Am I?	Jackie Chan; Benny Chan	Stunt performer	as Bradley Allan
1998	Hot War	Jingle Ma	Stunt performer	Uncredited
1999	Gorgeous	Vincent Kok	Stunt performer	as Bradley Allan
1999	Gen-X Cops	Benny Chan	Stunt performer	
1999	Jackie Chan: My Stunts	Jackie Chan	Stunt performer	
2000	Shanghai Noon	Tom Dey	Stunt performer Assistant fight choreographer	
2001	The Accidental Spy	Teddy Chan	Stunt performer Stunt co-ordinator	as Bradley James Allen
2001	Rush Hour 2	Brett Ratner	Stunt performer	as Bradley James Allan
2002	The Tuxedo	Kevin Donovan	Stunt performer	
2003	Shanghai Knights	David Dobkin	Stunt performer Action choreographer	Uncredited (S.P.)
2003	The Medallion	Gordon Chan	Stunt performer	as Bradley James Allan
2003	Peter Pan	P. J. Hogan	Fight co-ordinator	
2004	New Police Story	Benny Chan	Stunt choreographer	
2004	The Chronicles of Riddick	David Twohy	Stunt co-ordinator	
2005	The Pacifier	Adam Shankman	Stunt performer Fight choreographer	Uncredited (S.P.)
2006	Eragon	Stefen Fangmeier	Stunt rigger	
2007	Rush Hour 3	Brett Ratner	Stunt co-ordinator	as Bradley James Allan
2008	Hellboy II: The Golden Army	Guillermo del Toro	Action director Stunt co-ordinator	
2008	Bedtime Stories	Adam Shankman	Action choreographer	
2009	Ninja Assassin	James McTeigue	Stunt performer	
2009	A Christmas Carol	Robert Zemeckis	Stunts	
2009	Avatar	James Cameron	Stunts	Uncredited
2010	Percy Jackson & the Lightning Thief	Chris Columbus	Stunts	Uncredited
2010	Kick-Ass	Matthew Vaughn	Stunt co-ordinator	
2010	A Nightmare on Elm Street	Samuel Bayer	Fight choreographer	
2010	Scott Pilgrim vs. the World	Edgar Wright	Stunt co-ordinator Second unit director	
2011	Ghost Rider: Spirit of Vengeance	Mark Neveldine and Brian Taylor	Stunt co-ordinator Second unit director	
2011	Mars Needs Moms	Simon Wells	Stunts	
2011	I Am Number Four	D.J. Caruso	Stunt co-ordinator	
2011	The Adventures of Tintin: The Secret of the Unicorn	Steven Spielberg	Stunts	Uncredited
2012	Chinese Zodiac	Jackie Chan	Action co-ordinator	
2013	Pacific Rim	Guillermo del Toro	Action designer	
2013	The World's End	Edgar Wright	Stunt co-ordinator Second unit director	
2013	Iceman	Ariel Vromen	Action co-ordinator	
2014	Cuban Fury	James Griffiths	Stunt co-ordinator Second unit director	
2014	Wolves	David Hayter	Stunt co-ordinator Second unit director	
2015	Kingsman: The Secret Service	Matthew Vaughn	Stunt co-ordinator Second unit director	
2015	Little Boy	Alejandro Gómez Monteverde	Stunt co-ordinator	
2015	Insidious: Chapter 3	Leigh Whannell	Stunts	
2015	Sinister 2	Ciaran Foy	Stunts	
2017	Wonder Woman	Patty Jenkins	Stunts	
2017	Kingsman: The Golden Circle	Matthew Vaughn	Stunt co-ordinator Second unit director	
2018	Solo: A Star Wars Story	Ron Howard	Stunt co-ordinator Second unit director	
2021	Shang-Chi and the Legend of the Ten Rings	Destin Daniel Cretton	Supervising Stunt co-ordinator Second unit director	Posthumous release
2021	The King's Man	Matthew Vaughn	Stunt co-ordinator Second unit director	Posthumous release
2024	Argylle	Matthew Vaughn	Stunt co-ordinator	Posthumous release; Final film
