= Andy Cheng =

Chinese actor and stuntman

- Born: Kai-Chung Cheng; Hong Kong
- Occupations: Actor; Stuntman; Director; Fight coordinator
- Years active: 1990–present
- Spouse: Coco
- Children: 2

Cheng Kai-Chung, also known as Andy Cheng, is a Hong Kong actor, stuntman, choreographer, martial artist, and director. He was a prominent member of the Jackie Chan Stunt Team from the late 1990s to early 2000s until he broke out on his own and became a member of the Stunts Unlimited team. He has doubled for Chan on occasion when Chan suffered serious injuries, and Chan saved his life on the set of Rush Hour 2 when a boat stunt went awry. Cheng has been working steadily as both a director and stunt coordinator.

== Early life ==
Cheng was born in Hong Kong. At the age of 14, he began studying the Korean martial art of Tae Kwon Do. He won three gold medals at the Hong Kong Invitationals from 1988 to 1990, followed by a bronze medal at the 1991 Asian Games. He would retire from competition to start his career in the film industry.

== Film career ==
In 1990, Cheng was discovered by legendary filmmaker Lau Kar-leung and had a small role as a Tae Kwon Do instructor in New Kids in Town. From there, Andy spent the next five years working at TVB, owned and operated by the Shaw Brothers. He would then be invited to join the Jackie Chan Stunt Team and serve as a stuntman and occasional double for Chan himself when needed. This would lead Cheng to appear in prominent henchman roles in films like Rush Hour and Rush Hour 2 while doubling for Chan in films like Who Am I? and Mr. Nice Guy.

In 2001, Cheng was loaned out to director Isaac Florentine to amp up the action sequences and serve as lead fight choreographer on U.S. Seals II: The Ultimate Force. In addition to fight choreography, Andy appeared in the film as Artie, a blonde-haired henchman to Damian Chapa's villain character. This led to Cheng eventually forming his own team, with martial artist and assistant Dan Southworth as his assistant on films like The Scorpion King and The Rundown, both starring Dwayne Johnson with Cheng serving as the stunt coordinator and fight choreographer on these films.

In 2006, Cheng made his feature film directorial debut on End Game, a political thriller starring Cuba Gooding Jr. A year later, he followed that up with the car racing film Redline, starring Nathan Phillips and Nadia Bjorlin. Cheng was the stunt coordinator for the 2008 hit adaptation of Stephenie Meyer's acclaimed youth adult novel Twilight. Cheng has since worked steadily as a stunt coordinator in both television and film.
