= Nicola Berwick =

British stunt actor

Nicola Berwick(born 24 December 1978) is a British stunt actress.

== Biography ==
Nikki Berwick is a champion of tang soo do.

== Filmography as a stunt double ==
- 2012: 47 Ronin
- 2011: Green Lantern, Blake Lively
- 2008: Quantum of Solace
- 2008: Franklyn
- 2008: Indiana Jones and the Kingdom of the Crystal Skull
- 2007: The Bourne Supremacy
- 2007: Blood and Chocolate
- 2006: Casino Royale, Eva Green
- 2006: Jane Hall
- 2006: Basic Instinct 2, Sharon Stone
- 2005: The Legend of Zorro, Catherine Zeta-Jones
- 2005: Green Street, Claire Forlani
- 2004: Alexander (2004 film)
- 2004: Sky Captain and the World of Tomorrow, Bai Ling
- 2004: Thunderbirds, Sophia Myles
- 2004: Harry Potter and the Prisoner of Azkaban (film)
- 2004: The Life and Death of Peter Sellers
- 2004: Ella Enchanted (film), Anne Hathaway
- 2004: Agent Cody Banks 2: Destination London, Hannah Spearritt
- 2003: The Medallion
- 2003: Lara Croft Tomb Raider: The Cradle of Life, Angelina Jolie
- 2002: Die Another Day, Rosamund Pike
- 2002: Blade II, Leonor Varela
- 2001: Lara Croft: Tomb Raider, Angelina Jolie
- 2001: The Mummy Returns, Rachel Weisz & Patricia Velasquez
- 1997: Mortal Kombat Annihilation, Sonya Blade
