= Jackie Chan: My Stunts =

1999 Hong Kong documentary by Jackie Chan

- DVD cover
- Directed by: Jackie Chan; Xavier Lee (co-director)
- Written by: Bey Logan (english script); Toni O (mandarin script)
- Produced by: Jackie Chan; Thomas Chung; Willie Chan; Solon So
- Starring: Jackie Chan; Jackie Chan Stunt Team
- Narrated by: Michael Brown; Tsui Man
- Edited by: Xavier Lee
- Distributed by: Media Asia Films; Jackie Chan Group
- Release dates: 30 March 1999 (Hong Kong); 3 March 2000 (Japan); February 2004 (Singapore)
- Running time: 94 minutes
- Country: Hong Kong
- Languages: Cantonese; English

Jackie Chan: My Stunts (Chinese: 成龍：我的特技) is a 1999 documentary film about Jackie Chan's stunts, fights, and other related things and how he performs them. Throughout the film Jackie gives breakdowns of how the stunts were performed in many of his films, including Police Story. Who am I? and Rush Hour with demonstrations of different techniques and experiments inside his "stunt lab".

== Cast ==
- Jackie Chan as himself
- Yuen Biao (The Young Master footage)
- Ron Smoorenburg as himself (making of Who Am I?)
- Kwan Yung as himself (making of Who Am I?)
- Danielle Chau
- Reuben Langdon

=== Jackie Chan Stunt Team ===
- Ken Lo as himself
- Brad Allan as himself
- Paul Andreovski as himself (making of Who Am I?)
- Mars as himself
- Anthony Carpio as himself
- Nicky Li as himself
- Rocky Lai as himself
- Johnny Cheung as himself
- Louis Keung as himself
- Sam Wong as himself
- Chan Man Ching as himself
- Andy Cheng as himself
- Rocky Cheung as himself
- Jack Wong as himself

== See also ==
- Jackie Chan filmography
- Jackie Chan Stunt Team
