= Joe Eigo =

Canadian stunt performer

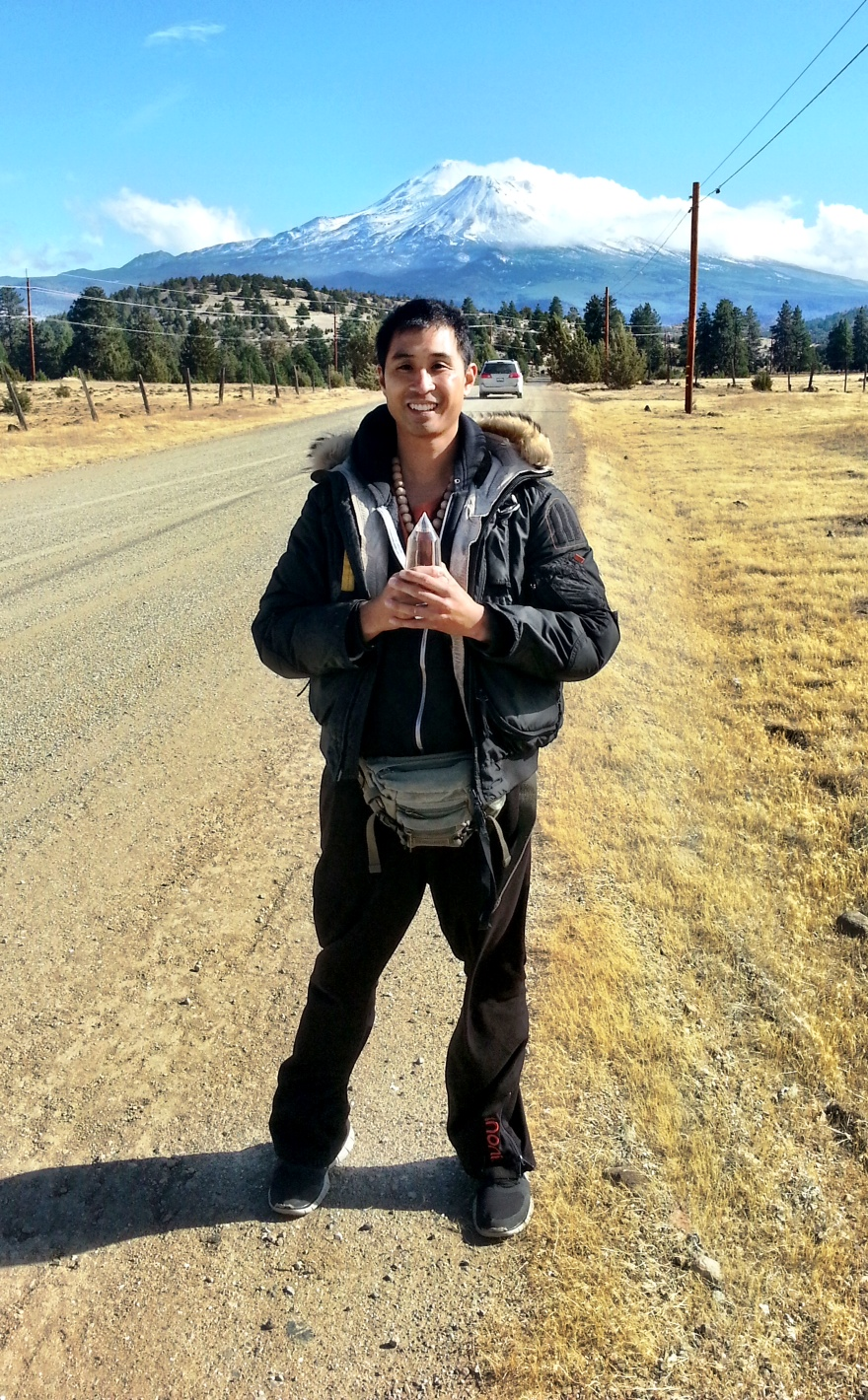
- Joe Eigo at Mount Shasta
- Born: February 19, 1980 (age 46); Toronto, Ontario, Canada
- Occupation: Performer/entrepreneur

Joe Eigo (born February 19, 1980) is a Canadian stunt performer.

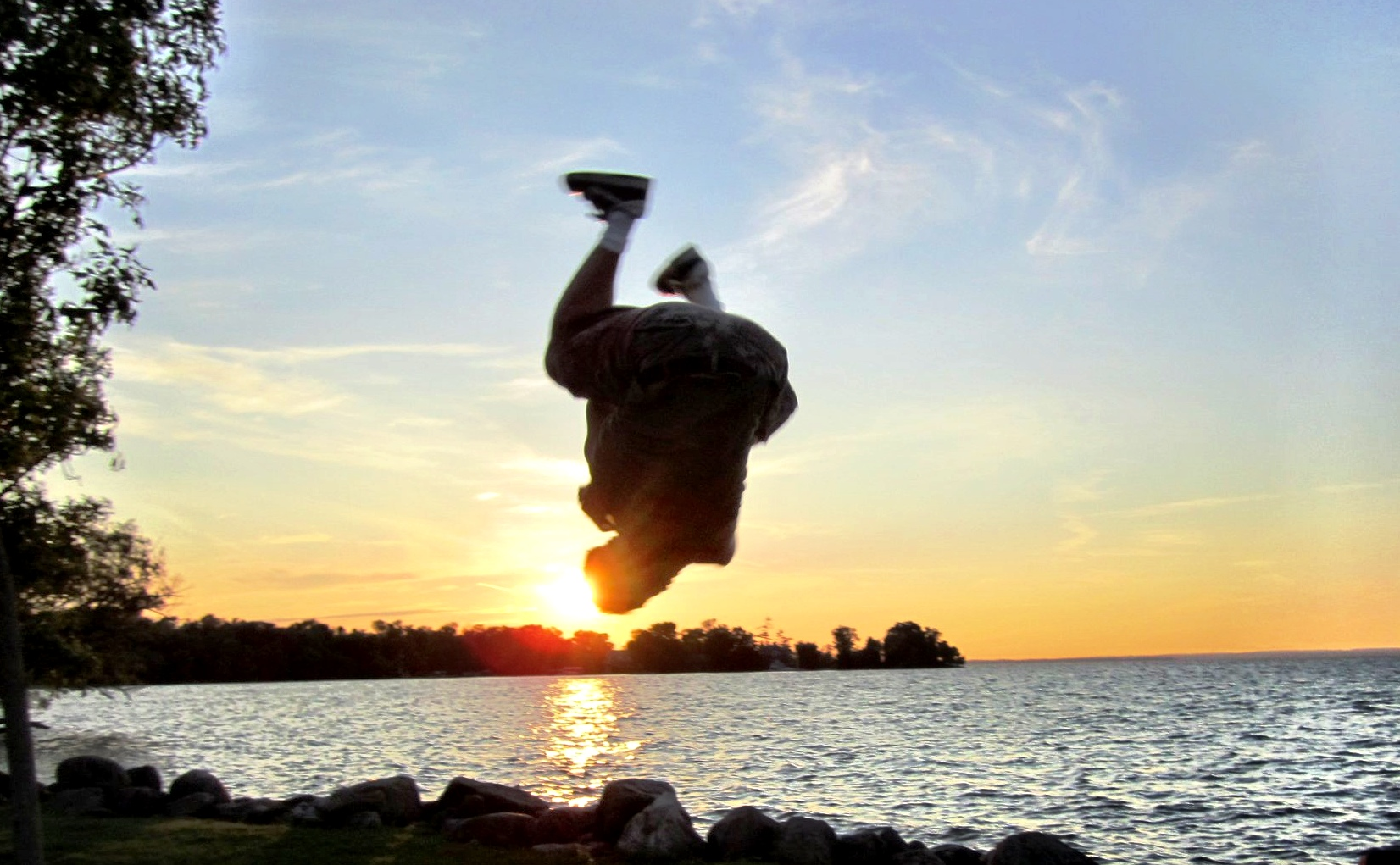
Joe Eigo in an aerial vortex flip

== Biography ==
Joe Eigo is the joint creator of "Multi Level Moves", which is "an experiment to explore the limits of the human body", essentially a rebranding of what is known as Tricking. He was a member of the Jackie Chan Stunt Team, performed with Chan in the 2004 film Around the World in 80 Days, and also performed in the 2006 Toronto musical production of The Lord of the Rings.

Eigo was the subject of a photo portrait by Toronto Star photographer Peter Power for which the Toronto Star received an award of excellence from the Missouri School of Journalism.

Eigo's "Matrix - for Real" video has been viewed over 4.5 million times on Metacafe, for which he had made US$25,000 as of January 2007. In the video, Eigo flips from boulders, trees and training mats, performs strings of back flips in the middle of a street, tosses a soccer ball in the air and then kicks it while completing a back flip.

Eigo is also an enthusiastic "truth" advocate. He most often makes claims towards the ulterior motives behind Climate engineering also, the use of Spiritual Sciences in conjunction with "powerful energy tools for planetary and personal healing". These claims have yet to be substantiated.

Eigo is a spokesman for the multilevel marketing company Morinda Inc., formerly known as Tahitian Noni company, which came under scrutiny for making many false claims about the health benefits of the product, "Noni-Juice".

== Filmography ==
- American Pie Presents: Beta House (2007)
- American Pie 5: The Naked Mile (2006) (stunts) (USA: informal title), a.k.a. American Pie Presents: The Naked Mile (Australia: DVD box title)
- Around the World in 80 Days (2004 film) (stunts) (as Jeffrey Joseph Eigo)
- LazyTown (2004) TV Series (stunt double for Sportacus 10), a.k.a. Latibær (Iceland)
- Christmas Rush (2002) (TV) (stunts) (uncredited), a.k.a. Breakaway (USA: video title)
- Odyssey 5 (2002) (TV) (stunt double)
- Witchblade (2000) (TV) (stunt double)
