= Mr. Nice Guy (1997 film) =

1997 Hong Kong film by Sammo Hung

- Film poster
- Traditional Chinese: 一個好人
- Simplified Chinese: 一个好人
- Hanyu Pinyin: Yī Gè Hǎo Rén
- Jyutping: Jat1 Go3 Hou2 Jan4
- Directed by: Sammo Hung
- Written by: Edward Tang; Ma Fibe
- Produced by: Leonard Ho; Chua Lam
- Starring: Jackie Chan; Richard Norton
- Cinematography: Raymond Lam
- Edited by: Peter Cheung
- Music by: Clarence Hui; Peter Kam; J. Peter Robinson
- Distributed by: Golden Harvest; New Line Cinema
- Release dates: 31 January 1997 (Hong Kong); 20 March 1998 (United States)
- Running time: 101 minutes
- Country: Hong Kong
- Language: English
- Budget: US$>25 million
- Box office: US$31.7 million

Mr. Nice Guy (一個好人, LSHK Jat1 go3 hou2 jan4) is a 1997 English-language Hong Kong action comedy film directed by Sammo Hung, who also cameos as an unfortunate cyclist. The film stars Jackie Chan and Richard Norton. The film was released theatrically in Hong Kong on 31 January 1997.

Mr. Nice Guy features a collaboration between Chan and Norton, reuniting them for the first time since 1993's City Hunter. Set in Melbourne, Victoria, Australia, it is Chan's first film to be scripted and shot in English.

== Plot ==
Giancarlo, the Italian mob's boss, discovers that his lover Tina is actually a mole for the Demons street gang, so he buries her alive at a mining site. Later, journalist Diana records footage of a cocaine deal between the mob and The Demons. During the deal, Giancarlo kills the Demons' leader Grank and a gun fight ensues. Giancarlo spots Diana and her partner Richard and orders the mob to chase them. Richard is captured while Diana flees, bumping into TV chef Jackie, who helps her escape. En route, she accidentally switches the videotape of the drug trade with one of Jackie's cooking videos. Jackie brings the tape to his adoptive brother, police officer Romeo. Romeo's children watch the video, unaware of what it is. The mob force Richard to give them Diana's address. They ambush Diana at her house and kidnap her after realizing that Jackie has the tape they want. Diana escapes after creating a distraction in front of a crowd.

The mob believes that Jackie has the tape and follows him around, while the Demons follow them, hoping for a chance to avenge Grank. Jackie is forced to fend them off and run when they attack him. Jackie learns why the mob is chasing him after Diana sneaks into his house searching for the tape. Before Diana can leave, Giancarlo's henchmen show up.

Jackie and the women escape just as the Demons blow up his apartment with grenades, killing the mobsters. The Demons later call Giancarlo to set up a meeting to trade the tape and the mob's stolen cocaine for a large sum of money. Everyone decides to stay at the home of Jackie's friend Lakeisha for safety, but the Demons soon find them. They kidnap Jackie's girlfriend Miki and give Jackie a cell phone, demanding that he give them the videotape in 12 hours. Jackie turns to Romeo for the police's help. The next day, Jackie goes to meet the Demons to trade in a decoy videotape, but no Demon meets Jackie in person. Instead, they frequently call him on his cell and make him go to various locations in the city.

Meanwhile, the police follows Jackie, but the gang discovers this and escapes with Miki. Jackie, angry at the cops' mishandling, refuses to work with them anymore. He is later kidnapped by the Demons. Jackie fights off the gang and causes their van to crash. Before the police show up, Jackie forces a Demons member to reveal where Miki is: at a construction site. Diana and Lakeisha follow Jackie. While Jackie looks for Miki, Giancarlo and his men arrive. A fight ensues and ends with the mobsters capturing Jackie. Lakeisha is also taken, while Diana is injured but escapes. Giancarlo murders the other Demons on site except for Sandy, who also escapes but with serious injuries.

Meanwhile, Romeo discovers his son watching Diana's tape, the proof he needs to arrest the mob, and visits the hospital where Diana and Sandy are being treated. The women mention what happened to Jackie and the others. At Giancarlo's home, Giancarlo demands the tape from Jackie. Jackie decides to call Romeo, but he is not home. Afterwards, Jackie is forced into an unfair fight with Giancarlo. After taking a beating, Giancarlo orders his men to kill Jackie, Nikki and Lakeisha at the mining site. However, they escape and destroy Giancarlo's home by driving through it in a mining vehicle, which also causes cocaine to be spread outside in view of the police. Jackie rams the vehicle at Giancarlo, who ends up heavily injured, humiliated and arrested. The authorities arrive with Romeo, but they decide to state that they did not witness anything and that it was just another gang battle, so that Jackie can go free while the mobsters are arrested for possession of cocaine.

== Cast ==
- Jackie Chan as Jackie
- Richard Norton as Giancarlo Luchetti
- Karen McLymont as Lakeisha
- Miki Lee as Miki
- Gabrielle Fitzpatrick as Diana
- Vince Poletto as Romeo
- Barry Otto as Baggio
- Sammo Hung as Cyclist (Cameo)
- Emil Chau as Ice cream vendor
- Mina Godenzi as Cook show audience
- Peter Houghton as Richard
- Peter Lindsay as Grank, Demon gang leader
- David No as Victor
- Rachel Blakely as Sandy, Demon gang member
- Judy Green as Tina, Demon gang member
- Aaron Notarfrancesco as Sonny
- Jake Notarfrancesco as Nancy
- Matthew Dyktynski as Cooking show floor manager
- Frederick Miragliotta as NEA head officer
- Nick Carrafa as NEA head officer

=== Jackie Chan Stunt Team ===
- Brad Allan
- Chan Man-Ching
- Andy Cheng
- Rocky Lai
- Nicky Li
- Mars
- Lee Seung Hoon

== Production ==
In 1996, Jackie Chan commented on Sammo Hung's unpopularity with film buyers: "[...] no one wants to see him in movies anymore. It's a very sad thing, so I called him up and we made a movie [Mr. Nice Guy] together again. So, right now Sammo can only direct; he cannot act."

The film was originally going to be the fifth film in Chan's Police Story film series, with its setting in Sydney, Australia, but in a month's time it was revised to become a stand-alone action film set in Melbourne. It is Chan's first film to be scripted and shot in English.

According to his book I Am Jackie Chan: My Life in Action, Chan hurt his neck when he messed up on a flip during a fight scene. He also broke his nose during filming.

== Box office ==
Mr. Nice Guy opened on Chinese New Year, 1997, against director Hung's own Once Upon a Time in China and America. Both were box office successes, but Mr. Nice Guy was the bigger of the two. It made HK$45,420,457 (US$5,866,697) during its Hong Kong run. In Taipei, Taiwan, Mr. Nice Guy grossed NT$43.1 million (US$1.5 million) and sold 201,407 tickets in 1997. In China, it grossed CN¥65 million (US$7.84 million) at the box office. In South Korea, it sold 702,027 tickets and grossed US$3.44 million. In Japan, it earned ¥370 million (US$3.06 million) at the box office.

In North America, Mr. Nice Guy was released by New Line Cinema on 20 March 1998 in 1,463 theatres. In its opening weekend, it grossed US$5,250,704 ($3,588 per screen) on its way to a total of US$12,716,953, equivalent to $26,016,998 adjusted for inflation in 2021. In Europe, the film sold 912,178 tickets. The film grossed US$19 million in international territories outside of North America, for a total of US$31,716,953 grossed worldwide, equivalent to $64,824,555 adjusted for inflation in 2021.

== Reception ==
On Rotten Tomatoes the film has an aggregated review score of 45% based on 31 critic reviews.

== Accolades ==
- 1997 Golden Horse Film Festival
  - Winner: Best Action Direction (Wing Cho)
- 1998 Hong Kong Film Awards
  - Nomination: Best Action Choreography (Wing Cho)

== New Line Cinema edit and DVD releases ==
For US$6 million, New Line Cinema acquired from Golden Harvest the international distribution rights to the film outside of Asia. The film received a partial dub, a new score, and more than 13 minutes of cuts were made. Most of the cuts were bits of violence (violence against women in particular), and cuts for pacing. Many scenes were also rearranged. The most noticeable scene rearrangement are the opening scenes of Giancarlo killing Tina and Jackie's cooking show. The original version opens with Giancarlo killing Tina, then Jackie's cooking show, but New Line Cinema's edit opens the other way around, giving the movie a "lighter" tone from the start.

There are also differences between the Hong Kong and the Japanese versions of the film. The only scene cut from the Hong Kong version is the entirety of a dinner scene featuring Jackie, Romeo, Baggio, Lakiesha, Sonny, and Nancy (Romeo's children). The Japanese version contains this scene in its entirety, whereas the New Line Cinema edit contains most of this scene, but with a few cuts.

Various DVD versions of this film have been made. The Warner Brothers Japanese R2 version is the only version available with the original English dialog and the fully uncut version (the Japanese edit). However, the picture is non-anamorphic and has no English subtitles. The Taiwan Funny version has the New Line Cinema and Taiwanese versions, but the latter is dubbed in Mandarin. The HK version is similar to the Taiwanese, but dubbed in Cantonese. Both dubbed Asian versions refer to the Demons as the "Wolves," although in the end credits the actors are credited as "Demons."

In September 2019, Warner Archive Collection announced that it would release the film on Blu-ray, including the original uncut version newly remastered in HD sourced from a 4K scan of the original camera negative, in addition to the original New Line cut. The Blu-ray was released on 29 October 2019.
