= Spider-Man: Brand New Day =

2026 Marvel Studios film

- Theatrical release poster
- Directed by: Destin Daniel Cretton
- Written by: Chris McKenna; Erik Sommers
- Based on: Spider-Man by: Stan Lee; Steve Ditko
- Produced by: Kevin Feige; Amy Pascal; Avi Arad; Rachel O'Connor
- Starring: Tom Holland; Zendaya; Sadie Sink; Jacob Batalon; Jon Bernthal; Florence Pugh; Tramell Tillman; Marisa Tomei; Mark Ruffalo
- Cinematography: Brett Pawlak
- Edited by: Nat Sanders; Gina Sansom; Harry Yoon
- Music by: Michael Giacchino
- Production companies: Columbia Pictures; Marvel Studios; Pascal Pictures
- Distributed by: Sony Pictures Releasing
- Release dates: July 27, 2026 (Dolby Theatre); July 31, 2026 (United States)
- Running time: 145 minutes
- Country: United States
- Language: English
- Budget: $225 million
- Box office: $2.524 billion

Spider-Man: Brand New Day is a 2026 American superhero film based on the Marvel Comics character Spider-Man. Produced by Columbia Pictures, Marvel Studios, and Pascal Pictures, and distributed by Sony Pictures Releasing, it is the 38th film in the Marvel Cinematic Universe (MCU) and the fourth film in the MCU Spider-Man film series following Spider-Man: No Way Home (2021). The film was directed by Destin Daniel Cretton, written by Chris McKenna and Erik Sommers, and stars Tom Holland as Peter Parker / Spider-Man alongside Zendaya, Sadie Sink, Jacob Batalon, Jon Bernthal, Florence Pugh, Tramell Tillman, Marisa Tomei, and Mark Ruffalo. In the film, Parker is on his own and dedicated to protecting New York City as the hero Spider-Man. His personal struggles and overworking cause his superpowers to evolve while he faces a new telepathic threat.

Sony was developing a fourth MCU Spider-Man film by August 2019, and producer Amy Pascal revealed in November 2021 that it was intended to be the first in a new trilogy starring Holland. Work on the story began that December, with Holland more involved in development than he was for the previous films. McKenna and Sommers returned as writers by February 2023, Cretton was hired to direct by October 2024, and the title—derived from the 2008 comic book storyline "Brand New Day" that reset Spider-Man's status quo—was announced in March 2025. The producers wanted Holland's Parker to be a "proper Spider-Man" for the first time, on his own and fighting street-level crime. Cretton rewrote the script with Justin Kuritzkes. Ahead of filming, Bernthal and Ruffalo were revealed to be reprising their MCU roles of Frank Castle / Punisher and Bruce Banner / Hulk. Filming took place from August to December 2025, with location filming in Glasgow, Scotland, and throughout England. Soundstage work occurred at Pinewood Studios in England.

Spider-Man: Brand New Day premiered at the Dolby Theatre in Hollywood, Los Angeles, on July 27, 2026, and was released in the United States on July 31 as part of Phase Six of the MCU. The film received largely positive reviews from critics, with praise for Holland's performance, the action sequences, and the more mature, character-driven story compared to the previous MCU Spider-Man films. It grossed $2.524 billion worldwide and set multiple box office records, becoming the highest-grossing Spider-Man film, the highest-grossing film of 2026, the highest-grossing film in the United States and Canada, and the third-highest-grossing film of all time. An extended cut, subtitled [Brand New] Brand New Day, is set for release on December 4.

== Plot ==
After Dr. Stephen Strange's magic spell makes the world forget that Peter Parker exists, he chooses to protect his girlfriend Michelle "MJ" Jones-Watson and best friend Ned Leeds by not reintroducing himself to them. Over the next four years, Parker anonymously protects New York City as its celebrated hero Spider-Man. He defeats major criminals, including Mac Gargan and the Hand ninjas, earning the trust of police detective Jean DeWolff. Parker regularly visits his aunt May's grave.

Parker stops Frank Castle from causing collateral damage in pursuit of a tank that crashes into a Department of Damage Control (DODC) prison. The driver is possessed by a telepath who body hops from person to person to help Gargan escape, but is unable to enter Parker's mind. Yelena Belova informs Parker that multiple DODC facilities have been attacked by someone searching for "V-Max". DODC director Bill Metzger, now using the Hand for security, denies any knowledge of "V-Max" to Parker.

Ned and MJ move back to New York after graduating from MIT. Parker encounters them and sees MJ kiss her new boyfriend. Returning home in distress, he wakes up the next day with heightened senses and spinnerets in his wrists. When the telepath attacks another DODC facility with a possessed Gargan, Parker loses control of his new abilities and brutally beats Gargan, inadvertently injuring a police officer. After DeWolff tells him to regain control, Parker learns from Bruce Banner, who has an inhibitor device that uses siRNA to suppress his super-powered alter ego, the Hulk, and builds his own inhibitor. While he tests it, the telepath finds his apartment and learns about MJ from an unsent reintroduction letter he wrote to her. Parker races to get MJ to safety, but the telepath possesses and almost kills her. He rescues MJ and identifies the telepath as teenager Jean Grey.

Parker takes MJ to Castle's hideout for protection, where she helps complete his inhibitor and a universal inhibitor. Jean attacks the DODC's headquarters with a possessed Banner, whose inhibitor is removed, causing him to become the Hulk. While Parker fights the Hulk, Jean possesses Castle to open a vault hiding DODC agents. Parker calms the Hulk, then blocks Jean's powers with the universal inhibitor while Metzger tranquilizes her. Jean mentions "Sara" before losing consciousness; Metzger claims he remembers thinking of a colleague by that name while possessed by Jean. Parker returns to MJ, who has found the letter. He apologizes for not telling her and declares his love, but MJ does not remember him nor reciprocate his feelings. Despite this, she invites him to her and Ned's apartment, where a masked Parker bonds with them both. After MJ describes not remembering anything while possessed, Parker realizes Metzger lied. Parker contacts Yelena, who learns from redacted DODC files that Sara is Jean's sister, another telepath kidnapped by the DODC.

Metzger experiments on Jean at a DODC facility on Roosevelt Island that Parker infiltrates. Jean deduces that "V-Max" is the weathered label on the air vent in her cell, the last thing Sara saw—and mentally communicated to Jean—before she died. Enraged, Jean creates a psionic field that extends beyond the facility, freezing everyone within it except for Parker, including MJ and Ned. Jean rebuffs Parker's apologies and attacks him using the Hand. He removes his inhibitor and embraces his new abilities, defeating the Hand and stopping Jean from killing Metzger. Parker lets her enter his mind, where she experiences a memory of May saying she loves him for who he is. Parker and Jean reconcile over their respective losses. Parker senses Castle shooting at Jean from a distance and shields her, sustaining a critical injury. Jean drops the psionic field.

Parker wakes up in a hospital with a remorseful Castle, who says Jean remotely kept him alive with her powers. Jean leaves the city, Metzger disappears, and the DODC comes under investigation. At May's grave, Parker vows to stop trying to do everything alone, later agreeing to let DeWolff handle a robbery while he recovers. Seeing Ned again, Parker reintroduces himself with their old handshake.

== Cast ==
- Tom Holland as Peter Parker / Spider-Man:
  A former Avenger who received spider-like abilities after being bitten by a radioactive spider. Following Dr. Stephen Strange's spell at the end of the film Spider-Man: No Way Home (2021), the world has forgotten that Parker exists and he is now focused on anonymously protecting New York City from street-level crime. Director Destin Daniel Cretton said Parker is "dedicating his entire existence" to being Spider-Man. Holland felt this was a unique and "profound" superhero story to tell, and said Parker's dedication to selflessness and sacrifice would have consequences for his personal life and health. He said the film focuses on Parker's search for identity as he transitions from youth to adulthood, inspired by Holland's own journey into adulthood. In Brand New Day, Parker's superpowers begin to evolve: his eyes turn fully black at times; his senses are heightened; and he gains the ability to generate organic webs from his wrists instead of relying on mechanical web-shooters, similar to Tobey Maguire's version of the character in Sam Raimi's Spider-Man film series (2002–2007).
- Zendaya as Michelle "MJ" Jones-Watson:
  Parker's former classmate and ex-girlfriend who attended the Massachusetts Institute of Technology (MIT) with Ned Leeds, with whom she shares an apartment. MJ has a new love interest in the film, causing conflicting feelings for Parker. Zendaya worked with the writers to ensure MJ's "quirks" from the previous films were retained while still maturing the character, after she felt an initial draft had made her too "normal".
- Sadie Sink as Jean Grey:
  A young mutant with psionic abilities such as telekinesis, telepathy, and possession. She is searching for her sister Sara, who was taken by the Department of Damage Control (DODC), bringing her into conflict with Spider-Man. Jean's origin story is depicted differently from the comics and prior adaptations, showing her learn about her powers alongside Sara instead of them manifesting after her friend Annie dies in a car crash. Sink watched the previous screen adaptations of Jean as reference, but noted that this version is very different. She and Cretton focused on portraying her as a "hurt teenager" who is lonely, angry, and desperate. Jean is still learning about her abilities, does not believe she is a villain, and thinks her actions are justified. Cretton said using a young, lonely person as the villain solidified his understanding of the film's ideas.
- Jacob Batalon as Ned Leeds:
  Parker's former best friend who attended MIT with MJ. He has created an app called "Spidey Tracker" in the hopes of learning who Spider-Man is, to thank him for saving Ned and his classmates while they were in high school as shown in the previous films. Batalon said Ned and MJ live "really great full lives" despite both feeling that "something's kind of missing" since forgetting about Parker.
- Jon Bernthal as Frank Castle / Punisher:
  A vigilante who, following the brutal murder of his family, aims to fight the criminal underworld by any means necessary, no matter how lethal the results are. Castle's "psychological state" going into Brand New Day was explored in the Disney+ television special The Punisher: One Last Kill (2026), with Bernthal saying the character has essentially "sworn off human beings" at this point. United States Army Special Forces member Colton Hill was on set to assist Bernthal with his portrayal, as he did on previous projects. Holland said the dynamic between Parker and Castle evolved into a "big brother/little brother rivalry" as he and Bernthal improvised during filming. Bernthal said Castle's role in the film was a "cautionary tale" for Parker, showing where the latter could end up if he goes down a darker, more solitary path. Castle operates from a houseboat named Golden Girl, built from a converted industrial barge, which serves as both a command center and a safe house. He also uses a comic-accurate version of the Punisher's Battle Van.
- Florence Pugh as Yelena Belova / Black Widow:
  A member of the New Avengers who was originally trained in the Red Room to be a Black Widow assassin. The character uses a New York bathhouse as her "office", where Spider-Man consults her and gains information that he needs for his missions. The film reveals that Belova is now known as the "Black Widow", an alias used by her sister Natasha Romanoff before her death.
- Tramell Tillman as Bill Metzger:
  The head of the DODC. A radical anti-mutant activist in the comics, Metzger is revealed in the film to be experimenting on superpowered individuals. Tillman discussed the character's motivations, which are kept from the audience, with Cretton and writer Justin Kuritzkes. His performance was inspired by politicians, particularly the calmness and steadiness of former U.S. President Barack Obama.
- Marisa Tomei as May Parker: Peter's aunt, who was killed in No Way Home. She appears inside a memory that Peter shares with Jean.
- Mark Ruffalo as Bruce Banner / Hulk:
  A founding Avenger and genius scientist who, because of exposure to gamma radiation, transforms into a muscular, green-skinned humanoid when enraged or agitated. Banner is now a professor at Empire State University (ESU), teaching quantum mechanics, and Peter turns to him for help regarding his evolving superpowers. Banner wears an inhibitor device to suppress the gamma radiation in his body and appear in his human form; this technology was introduced during the mid-credits scene of the film Shang-Chi and the Legend of the Ten Rings (2021) and explained in the Disney+ television series She-Hulk: Attorney at Law (2022). In Brand New Day, after the inhibitor is removed and Jean interferes with his mind, Banner regresses to his uncontrollable, destructive "Savage Hulk" persona, last seen in the film Avengers: Infinity War (2018).

Additionally, Michael Mando reprises his MCU role of Mac Gargan / Scorpion, a criminal who was captured by Spider-Man and arrested in the film Spider-Man: Homecoming (2017), and now wears a suit of armor equipped with a mechanized scorpion-like tail. Liza Colón-Zayas portrays Jean DeWolff, a New York City Police Department (NYPD) detective; Olivia Booth-Ford plays Sara Grey, Jean's older sister who has the same mutant powers as her; Shannon Young Cho portrays Cindy, one of Banner's students at ESU; stunt performer and martial artist Xiaoshuang Fan plays Snow, the leader of a group of ninjas called the Hand; Naomi Watts voices E.V., Parker's AI assistant; and Keith David narrates a nature documentary on spiders that Parker watches. Eman Esfandi appears as MJ's unnamed boyfriend, identified by the film's subtitles as "Paul". Esfandi denied speculation that he was portraying Paul Rabin, one of Mary Jane Watson's boyfriends from the comics. News anchor Pat Kiernan appears as himself after doing so in various other MCU projects.

Zabryna Guevara is briefly seen as Sheila Rivera, the new mayor of New York City from the Disney+ television series Daredevil: Born Again (2025–present), during an opening montage that also includes short appearances by Marvin Jones III as Lonnie Lincoln / Tombstone, a superhuman crime boss with albinism; stunt performer Aidan Kennedy as Fred Myers / Boomerang and as a member of the Hand; Billy Clements as Ramrod, a cyborg; and an unknown performer as the Tarantula. Photographs of Tony Revolori and Martin Starr as their respective MCU characters Flash Thompson and Roger Harrington are also seen. Rosario Dawson reprised her role as Claire Temple from Marvel's Netflix television series for a scene that was cut from the original theatrical release, but is set to be included in the extended cut re-release.

== Production ==
=== Development ===
==== Interest and writing delay ====
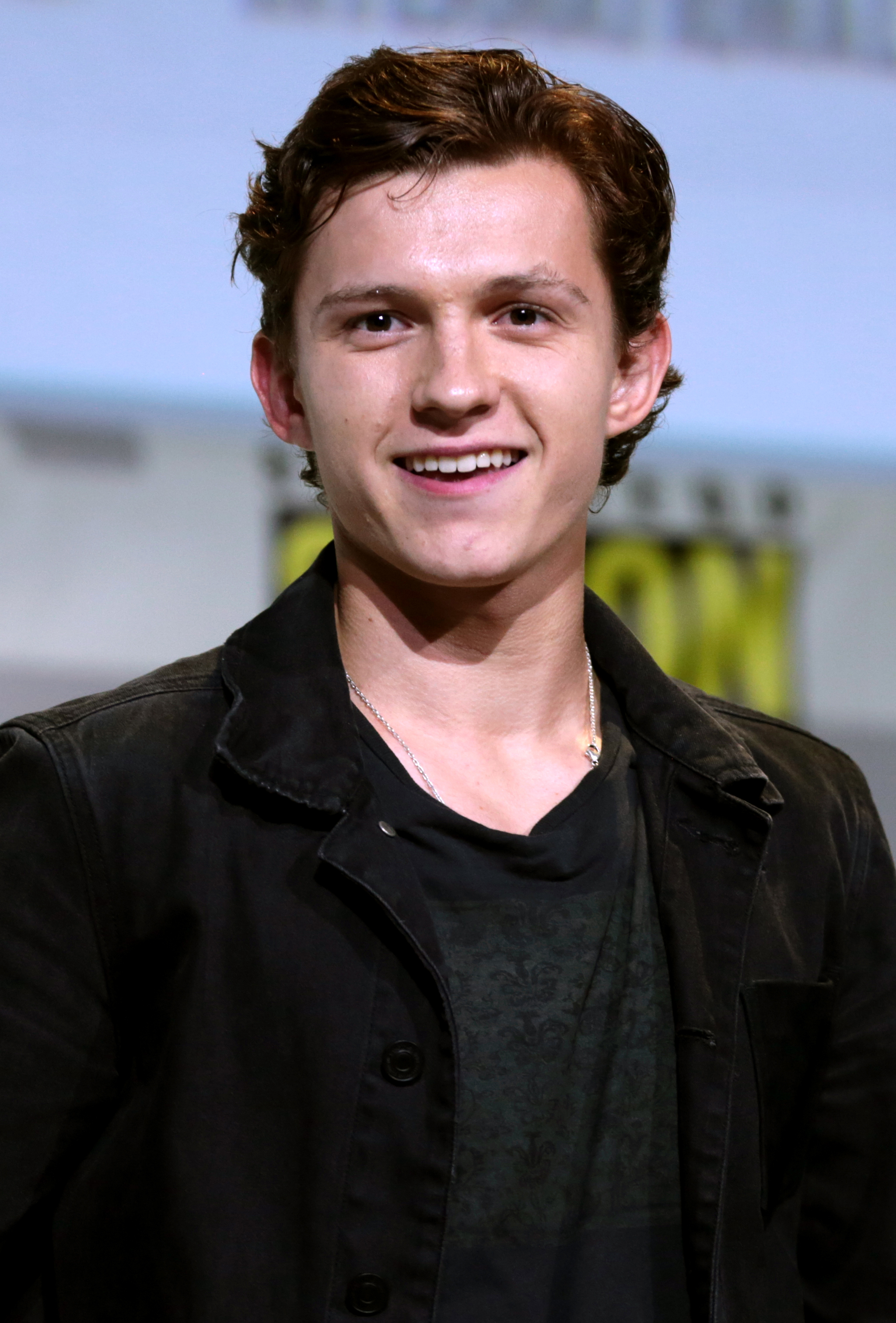
Star Tom Holland (pictured in July 2016) was more involved in Brand New Day's development than he was for the previous MCU Spider-Man films.

Sony Pictures said in August 2019 that it would not be making future Spider-Man films with Marvel Studios and its president, Kevin Feige, after negotiations to update the production deal between the two companies failed. Sony co-produced Spider-Man: Homecoming (2017) and Spider-Man: Far From Home (2019) with Marvel Studios and Amy Pascal, and was reported to be developing two more films. Following a negative fan reaction, Sony and Marvel's parent company Disney returned to negotiations and announced a new agreement at the end of September, allowing Marvel Studios and Feige to produce Spider-Man: No Way Home (2021) with Pascal. In February 2021, Peter Parker / Spider-Man star Tom Holland said No Way Home was the final film in his contract but he hoped to continue playing the character, and later added that any further Spider-Man films would differ from the previous trilogy and feature a tonal change.

Around the release of No Way Home in December 2021, Holland said he was unsure if he should continue making Spider-Man films, feeling he would have done something wrong if he were still portraying the character in his thirties. He was interested in a film being made about Miles Morales / Spider-Man instead, and added that he would be saddened to leave the franchise but he had achieved what he wanted with the character. Despite these comments, Pascal hoped to continue working with Holland on future Spider-Man films, and said work on the first film in a new trilogy was about to begin. Aaron Couch at The Hollywood Reporter said Sony did not yet have official plans for further MCU Spider-Man films but hoped to continue its collaboration with Marvel Studios. Pascal hoped the partnership between Sony and Disney would last forever, and Feige promised that it would not break down again as it did during No Way Home's development. He said Holland would return in another MCU film and confirmed that Marvel Studios had begun discussing the story for the next Spider-Man film with Pascal, Sony, and Disney.

By April 2022, Sony was expecting director Jon Watts to return from the previous trilogy after he exited as director of Marvel Studios' Fantastic Four film (2025). Sony Pictures CEO and chairman Tom Rothman hoped the "whole group" would return, including Watts, Holland, and Zendaya—Holland's then-girlfriend and later wife who portrays Michelle "MJ" Jones-Watson. In February 2023, Feige said writers were working on a story with "big ideas", but this was put on hold in May because of the 2023 Writers Guild of America strike. Pascal said work would resume after the strike concluded. Holland said he was in meetings about ideas and "ambitions" for the film, and these were also put on hold due to the strike. He was happy with the creative reasoning for why a fourth film should be made, but was apprehensive about the stigma surrounding fourth films. He felt they "hit a home run" with the first three films, calling No Way Home the "perfect send-off", and part of him wanted to exit the franchise on that high note and "pass the baton" to another actor. Holland only wanted to return if they could "do justice to the character".

==== Restarting active work ====
The writers' strike ended in September 2023, and Holland confirmed in November that discussions had resumed. He had more input on the story than with the previous films because he was involved in the creative process much earlier. Holland tried to understand fan sentiment on the internet because "we make these movies for [the fans]", and said fans were interested in a more relatable film where Spider-Man does not have to save the world. He presented this "vibe" to the studios, who also believed a more character-focused approach made sense after struggling to determine how they could go "bigger" than No Way Home's multiverse-based crossover story. Holland pitched that Parker's powers should go through puberty-like changes, which the creative team liked and developed further. Another proposal was to give him a pet dog, which was rejected.

Journalist Jeff Sneider reported in early 2024 that Justin Lin had been in contention to direct; that Chris McKenna and Erik Sommers had returned from the prior three films to write the script; and that filming was set to begin in September or October of that year, delaying filming for the third season of Euphoria (2026) to accommodate Zendaya's schedule. In April, Holland said they were giving the writers the time they needed to work on the script following the strike. Feige said in July that a script draft was being submitted "relatively soon", and Watts might not direct due to his schedule. Watts ultimately chose not to direct the film.

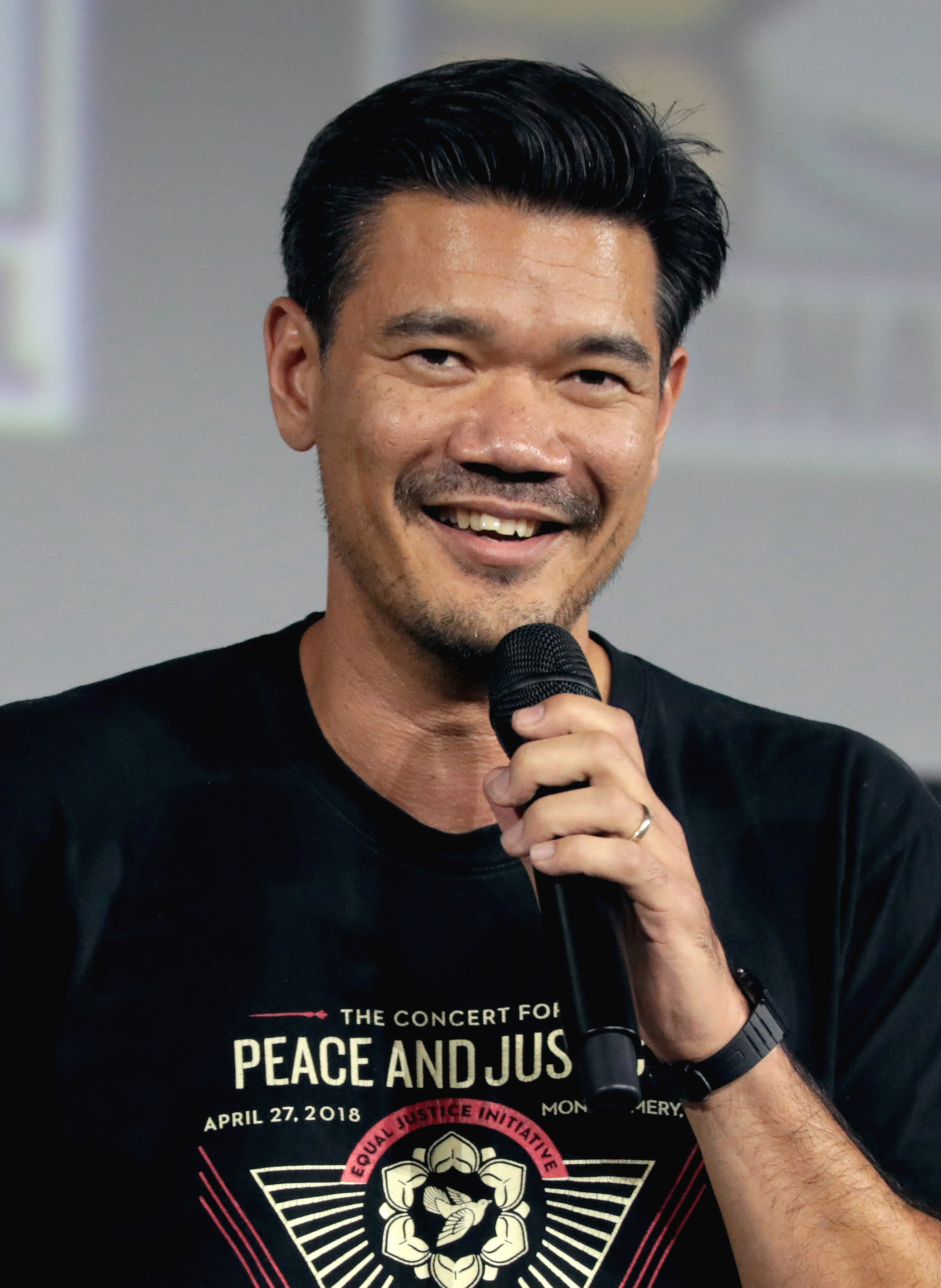
Destin Daniel Cretton was hired to direct the film after working on other Marvel Studios projects.

After further work on the script, the studios began meeting with directors. Destin Daniel Cretton was the top choice to direct by September 2024. He directed the film Shang-Chi and the Legend of the Ten Rings (2021) for Marvel Studios and signed an overall deal with them in December 2021 that included directing a sequel to that film and developing the Disney+ series Wonder Man (2026). Cretton was also hired to direct the MCU crossover film Avengers: The Kang Dynasty in July 2022, but stepped down in November 2023; The Kang Dynasty was subsequently reworked into Avengers: Doomsday (2026). Cretton later said he did not feel like the right fit for that story. He discussed other potential projects with Feige and the fourth Spider-Man film was raised as a possibility. It was said to be the priority for Marvel Studios over a sequel to Shang-Chi and the Legend of the Ten Rings. Feige and Pascal informed Cretton of their plans for a more grounded story that focused on Parker's isolation following the events of No Way Home, and he was interested in exploring the character's loneliness. As Cretton entered talks to direct in September, Holland and Zendaya were also reportedly in talks to return, McKenna and Sommers were confirmed to be writing, and filming was expected to begin in early 2025.

In October 2024, Holland was cast in The Odyssey (2026), and Sony approved his request to delay filming by six months so he could complete that film first. Cretton denied that he only joined the film because of this delay, but appreciated the extra development time. Holland was excited after reading a script draft with Zendaya, but he felt further work was needed, and said the script was "going in a hundred different directions" before Cretton's hiring. He confirmed that filming would now begin in mid-2025, and said it would be challenging but achievable to fit into the overall plan for the MCU. At the end of October, Holland and Cretton were confirmed to have signed on and the film was scheduled for release on July 24, 2026. Justin Kuritzkes, who worked with Zendaya on the film Challengers (2024), rewrote the script with Cretton during the additional development period, after McKenna and Sommers left to work on Doomsday and Avengers: Secret Wars (2027). Cretton said Kuritzkes brought a different perspective and wrote "some of the most beautiful scenes", including the memory Parker has of his aunt May. Kuritzkes continued working with Cretton until the film was finished, and received an offscreen "additional literary material" credit; McKenna and Sommers were officially credited as writers.

Throughout late 2024, Sneider reported on shifting production schedules and potential changes to Zendaya's role due to her commitments to Euphoria's third season, The Odyssey, and the film Dune: Part Three (2026), which were all scheduled to be filmed in 2025. Katcy Stephan at Variety also reported that Zendaya's role in the next Spider-Man film was unclear following her November 2024 casting in The Odyssey. Sneider reported that Charlie Cox would reprise his role as Matt Murdock / Daredevil from No Way Home and other MCU media, but Cox denied his involvement in October 2025.

=== Pre-production ===
In February 2025, filming was confirmed to start in mid-2025 in London, and the release date was pushed back a week to July 31, 2026, to distance it from the release of The Odyssey earlier that month. In March, Sadie Sink was cast as Jean Grey, a member of the X-Men in the comics. She was offered the role without auditioning, having worked with Cretton on the film The Glass Castle (2017). Her character was kept secret until the film's release, and became the subject of speculation, with many believing it to be Jean. Pascal likened this to Tobey Maguire and Andrew Garfield appearing as previous versions of Spider-Man in No Way Home, which was also kept secret until that film's release and became the subject of speculation. Pascal and Cretton both said the secrecy was for the benefit of surprising fans upon the film's release. At the end of March, Holland and Cretton announced the title as Spider-Man: Brand New Day. McKenna and Sommers said the creative team wanted to differentiate the film from the previous trilogy by not using "home" in the title. "Brand New Day" is a 2008 comic book storyline that has some similarities to this film, and they found that title "just too appealing" for a story that shows a fresh start for its main character.

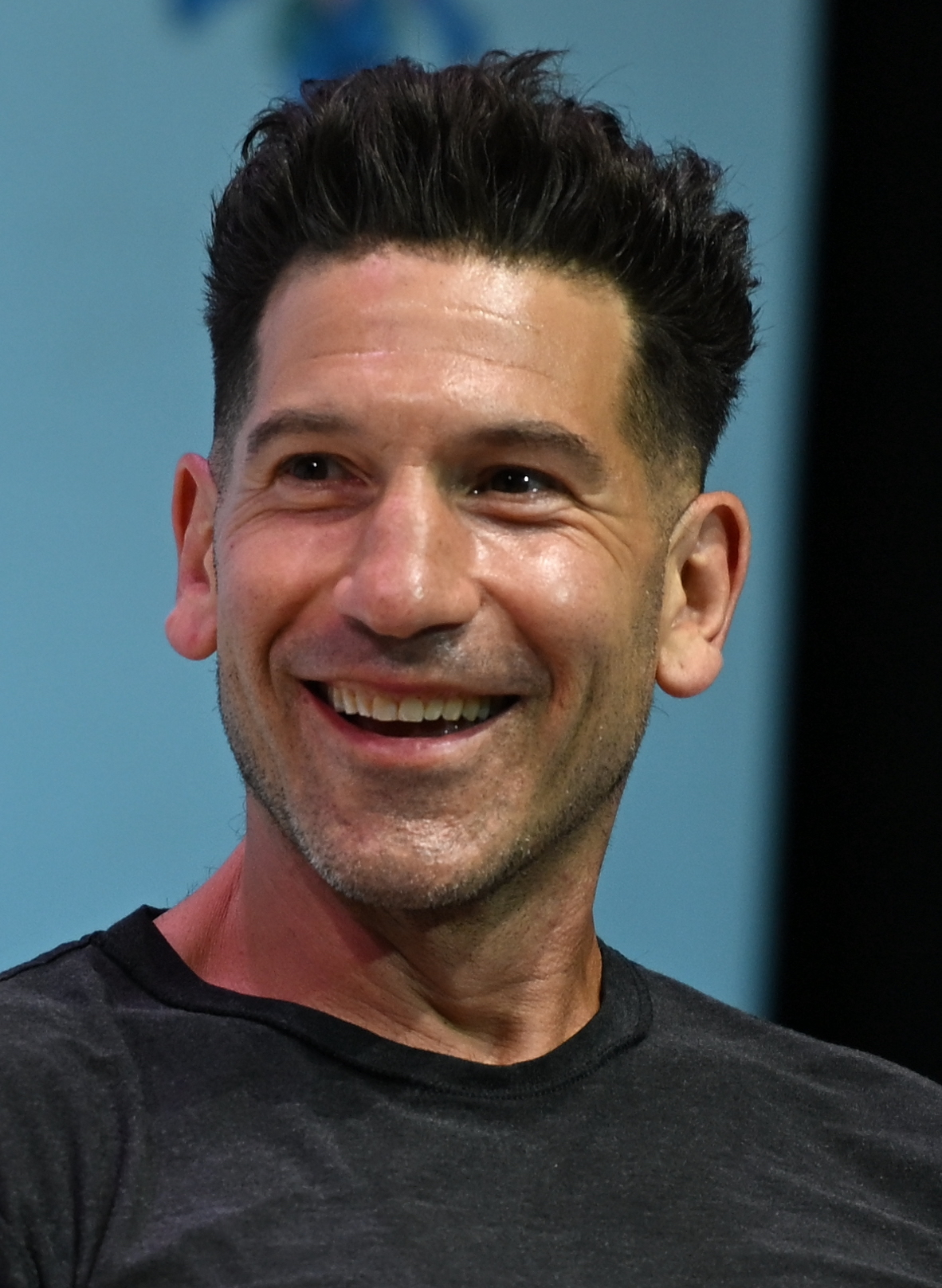
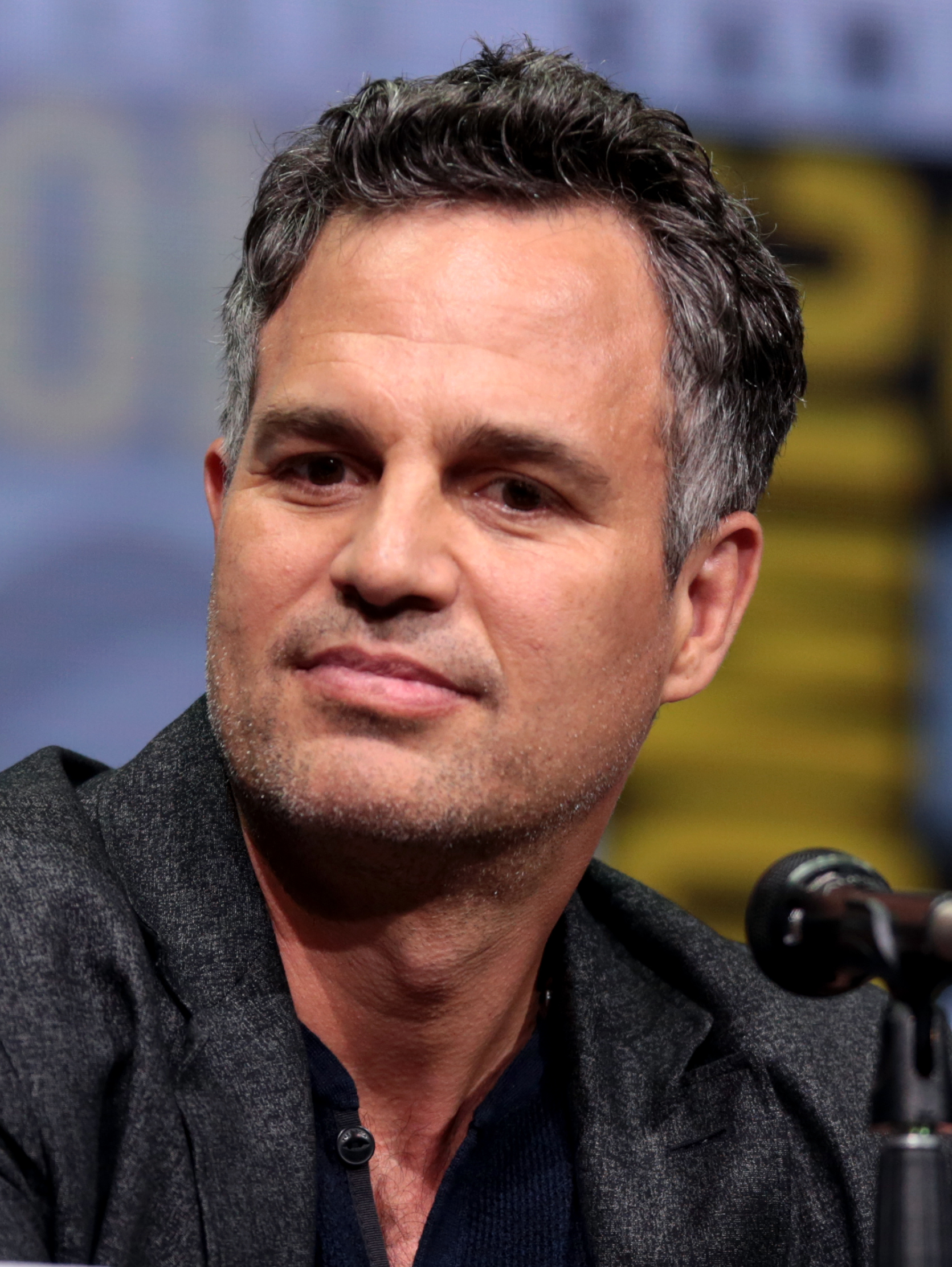
Jon Bernthal and Mark Ruffalo reprised their respective MCU roles of Frank Castle / Punisher and Bruce Banner / Hulk as part of an agreement between Sony and Marvel Studios.

Liza Colón-Zayas joined the cast in May, as detective Jean DeWolff, while Zendaya and Jacob Batalon—who portrays Ned Leeds—were confirmed to be returning from the previous films in June. Filming was set to begin that August, and Jon Bernthal was revealed to be reprising his MCU role of Frank Castle / Punisher. Holland and Bernthal worked together on the film Pilgrimage (2017) and helped each other during the casting process for their respective MCU roles. Holland said it was challenging to include an R-rated character like the Punisher in Brand New Day, and they worked to ensure an "authentic" portrayal of Castle, including by finding workarounds for his profanity and violence; in one example, Spider-Man covers Castle's mouth with webs when he tries to swear. Bernthal said it was important to himself, Holland, and Cretton that the film's portrayal of Castle feel like the same character that is seen in the Disney+ television special The Punisher: One Last Kill (2026).

The filmmakers were in constant discussions with the creative team behind the Disney+ series Daredevil: Born Again (2025–present), to ensure "impacts are felt" between the two projects and events line up for their shared characters, such as Castle and Sheila Rivera. Marvel Television head Brad Winderbaum said the tones of each project were different but they exist in the same world. Following rumors that Mark Ruffalo would reprise his MCU role of Bruce Banner / Hulk, his casting was confirmed with the start of filming in August 2025. The Hollywood Reporter's Couch and Borys Kit said Ruffalo's role only "firmed up" as the script came together in the lead-up to filming. The previous MCU Spider-Man films each featured a major MCU co-star as part of Sony's deal with Marvel Studios, similar to the Marvel Team-Up comic books that feature Spider-Man teaming-up with different heroes. They felt Brand New Day was "stacking the deck" by featuring both Bernthal and Ruffalo. Holland previously expressed interest in Spider-Man teaming-up with the Hulk, enjoying an image from the comics of the pair together and believing they should have a "big brother–little brother" dynamic. Bringing the two characters together on screen was a long-held dream for Feige. Also in August, Michael Mando was set to reprise his role as Mac Gargan / Scorpion from Homecoming, following up on that film's mid-credits scene.

==== Story ====
Holland and Cretton described Brand New Day as the start of a new chapter for Parker that would have a more mature tone than the previous trilogy. Those films explored an expanded version of the first act of Sam Raimi's film Spider-Man (2002)—which shows Maguire's Peter Parker in high school—that concludes with Holland's Parker living on his own at the end of No Way Home. Feige said this was a promise that audiences would see him as a "proper Spider-Man" for the first time, with "classic elements" from the comics and Spider-Man fighting street-level crime rather than dealing with "world-ending events". Marvel wanted to include other street-level heroes that Holland's Spider-Man had not interacted with before, such as the Punisher. Unlike the previous trilogy, which used each film's major MCU co-star as a mentor for Parker, Brand New Day depicts him having more of a coworker relationship with the supporting characters. McKenna and Sommers said this was part of Parker growing up and no longer looking to more experienced heroes for guidance.

No Way Home ends with Dr. Stephen Strange casting a spell to make the world forget that Parker exists. MJ and Ned remember their interactions with Spider-Man but not who he is. Cretton said there were many discussions about the mechanics of the spell, and they followed set rules such as not showing any pictures that Parker should appear in. Brand New Day is set four years after the spell was cast, allowing the characters to grow up since No Way Home. Holland said Parker is in "the darkest chapter of his life", fully dedicating himself to being Spider-Man and neglecting his civilian life. He said Parker's inability to balance professional and personal life was one of the film's core themes, and an important message for young people in the digital age. The character's trauma and stress trigger an evolution in his superpowers, including gaining the ability to shoot organic webs from his wrists similar to the 2005–06 comic book storyline "The Other". Cretton said this is frightening for Parker, who initially believes he is becoming a monster. Sommers said Parker always struggles to balance his civilian life with being Spider-Man, and in this film he "has given up so much of his humanity that the spider side of him is starting to fill that vacuum". After trying to suppress the transformation, Parker learns to embrace both sides of himself and find balance. McKenna said the film's title applies to its end as much as its beginning, with Parker's character arc ending with him able to "actually have a brand new day and move forward".

McKenna and Sommers thought the shapeshifting villain Chameleon was an appropriate classic Spider-Man antagonist to use for a "metamorphosis" story. They considered giving him the telepathic ability to possess people instead of making him a physical shapeshifter, to differentiate him from the shapeshifting alien Skrulls seen in previous MCU projects. Chameleon was unable to be included after Sony used him in the film Kraven the Hunter (2024), part of Sony's Spider-Man Universe (SSU), so other telepathic characters were considered as the main antagonist, including the Shadow King. The writers considered having that character telepathically search for his own body around New York City, although they felt Parker would not be able to develop a satisfying connection with a villain who has no body. Another character considered was Jean Grey, a young telepath who has a similar journey of trauma and loss to Parker, with no mentor figures or community of support. Cretton said Jean became the "perfect" option once Sink's casting was suggested, and denied that she was included as part of a mandate to set up Marvel Studios' untitled X-Men film (2028). Once Grey was chosen, the writers were able to solidify the story after going through many iterations to suit different potential villains.

Brand New Day takes place before Doomsday, which was originally scheduled to be released first. Cretton said its delay to December 2026 allowed Brand New Day to stand alone and include elements that would not have been possible if it came after Doomsday. Pascal said the Punisher and the Hulk were included because they face similar problems to Parker, with McKenna adding that Banner was the perfect character to help Parker with his mutating powers. MCU character Yelena Belova / Black Widow was featured in the script from the first draft. The creative team wanted Parker to be able to defeat the film's minor antagonists within a day or two. They include Tombstone, Boomerang, Tarantula, Ramrod, and the Hand ninjas who were previously seen in Marvel's Netflix television series. Additionally, Parker uses Shocker's gauntlet from Homecoming to fight the Hulk. Cretton said there were discussions about many other characters being added, including Shang-Chi and the Legend of the Ten Rings protagonist Xu Shang-Chi, and comic villain Paste-Pot Pete.

==== Design ====
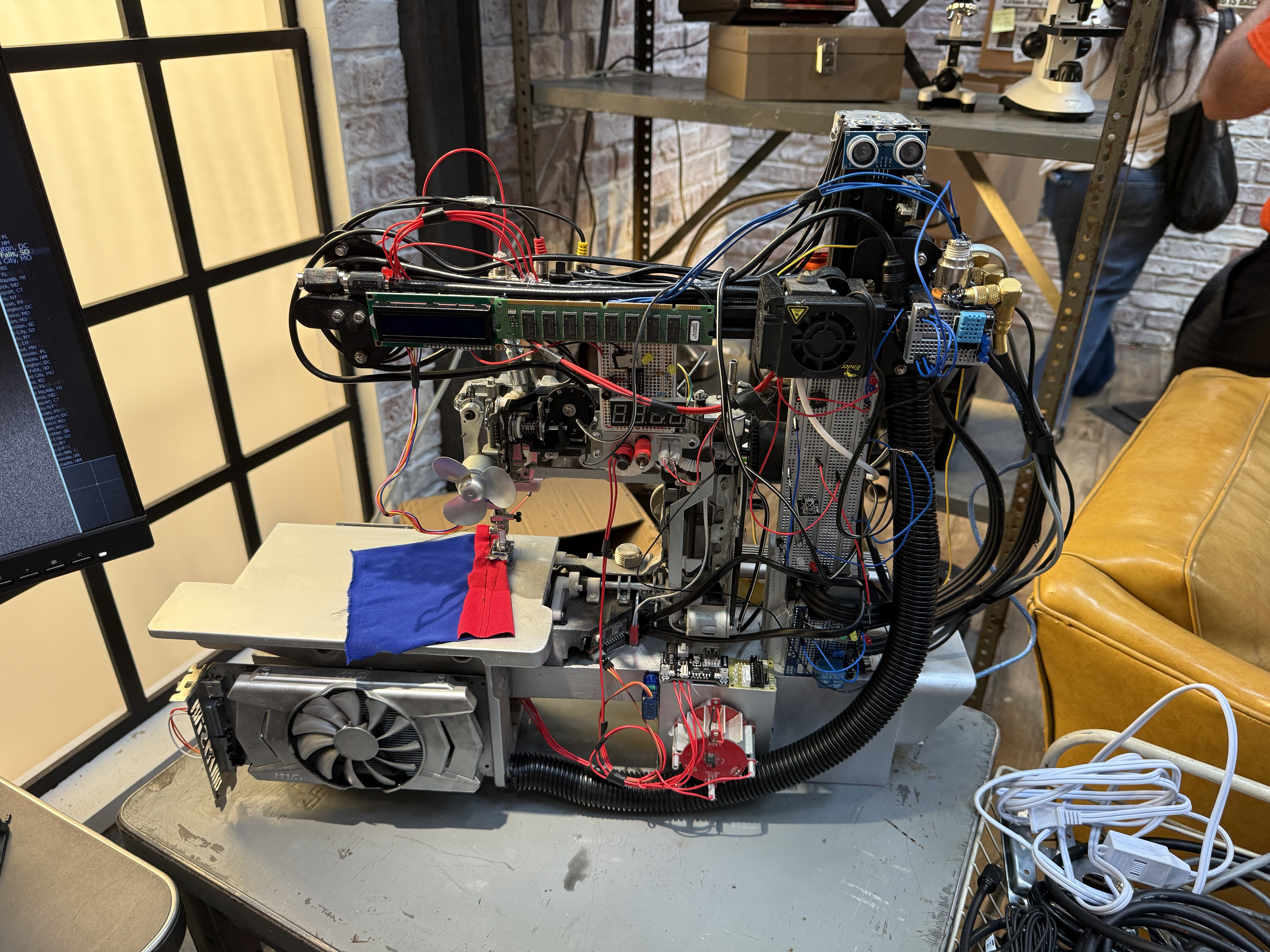
Sony and Little Caesars created a replica of Parker's apartment from Brand New Day as a fan experience, including his "Fabricator" which builds and repairs his Spider-Man suit.

Charles Wood returned as production designer from previous MCU media, and costume designer Sanja Milkovic Hays also returned from No Way Home and other MCU films. She said the first conversations for Brand New Day were about Parker being on his own, with no access to Tony Stark's money and resources, so he had to build his own Spider-Man suit which Cretton wanted to look more homemade than Holland's previous costumes. Parker also builds an artificial intelligence (AI) called E.V., voiced by Naomi Watts who worked with Holland on the film The Impossible (2012); and a homemade "Fabricator", a combination of a sewing machine and a 3D printer that builds and repairs his suit.

Holland was involved in designing the new Spider-Man suit. It is similar to the suit that was introduced at the end of No Way Home, which was made by Holland's Parker following his interactions with Maguire's and Garfield's Spider-Men in that film. The script for No Way Home explains that Parker took inspiration from the suits worn by those characters when designing his own. Holland liked the idea of Parker "trying to be his big brothers, that he looks up to them and sees little details on their suits that he thinks are really cool". He tried on costumes originally made for Maguire and Garfield, and researched which details fans liked most about those suits. The previous films used visual effects to perfect the suit, but for Brand New Day the creative team chose not to do this so wrinkles and imperfections could be seen, including Holland's face moving underneath the mask. Holland wears the suit for around 80 percent of the film, much more than the previous films, and he said it was built completely differently from his previous costumes, which made it comfier and more flexible.

Jean Grey wears a hood to hide her identity, with green and yellow colors used as a reference to the comics. Influences on Castle's appearance include the cover of The Punisher War Journal #15 by Jim Lee and John Buscema's design for the character. His vest was made by a manufacturer of real military vests and then painted with the Punisher's skull symbol. The filmmakers considered using the Hulk's original gray look from the comics, dubbed "Gray Hulk", before deciding the audience should see the more familiar green "Savage Hulk". Ruffalo's facial features were de-emphasized in the design. Scorpion's armor and the end of his mechanized tail were built by specialty costume company FBFX. The rest of his tail was created with visual effects.

Wood did extensive research in New York City before recreating parts of it on the streets of Glasgow, Scotland, and on sets at Pinewood Studios in Buckinghamshire, England. Two or three city blocks of buildings and rooftops were built on a backlot, including a rooftop with a large "Silver Cup" sign. Other sets included Parker's apartment, which has a view of Queensboro Bridge to show that "he had this view of the city he could never join"; MJ and Ned's apartment in Queens; Jean's cell, which was built inside a larger space that is revealed when the walls are raised; and Yelena's bathhouse "office", inspired by a Victorian era bathhouse in Manchester. For the tank seen early in the film, Wood requested several symbols be put on it including a devil and a panther. The devil symbol was compared to the logo for Mister Negative's Inner Demons gang from the comics.

=== Filming ===
Principal photography began on August 3, 2025, in Glasgow under the working title Blue Oasis, with Brett Pawlak returning as cinematographer from many of Cretton's previous films. The film was shot on the Arri Alexa 265 camera with Panavision's Primo 65 and Panaspeed lenses, in two aspect ratios: 2.39:1 for wide screens and 1.90:1 for digital IMAX. Pawlak wanted the film's color grading to combine "incredibly saturated reds and blues" with "deep blacks and shadow", inspired by the depictions of Spider-Man's costume in the Amazing Fantasy comic book. Holland was inspired by director Christopher Nolan's efficient approach on The Odyssey and wanted to bring a similar work ethic to Brand New Day, insisting that they have each day's filming planned ahead of time, and that practical stunts be performed when possible. Peng Zhang coordinated the fight sequences, returning from Shang-Chi and the Legend of the Ten Rings. Some stunts were inspired by the Marvel's Spider-Man video game series, including its finishing moves. The production team analyzed footage of wingsuit flyers and parkour athletes for the scenes where Spider-Man swings on his webs. For the fight between Parker and the Hand, when the latter are under Jean's control, Zhang choreographed the ninjas in a bird wing-inspired formation, referencing Jean's comic book connection to the Phoenix Force. Dance choreographer Nathan Kim designed the body movements for when Jean is body hopping.

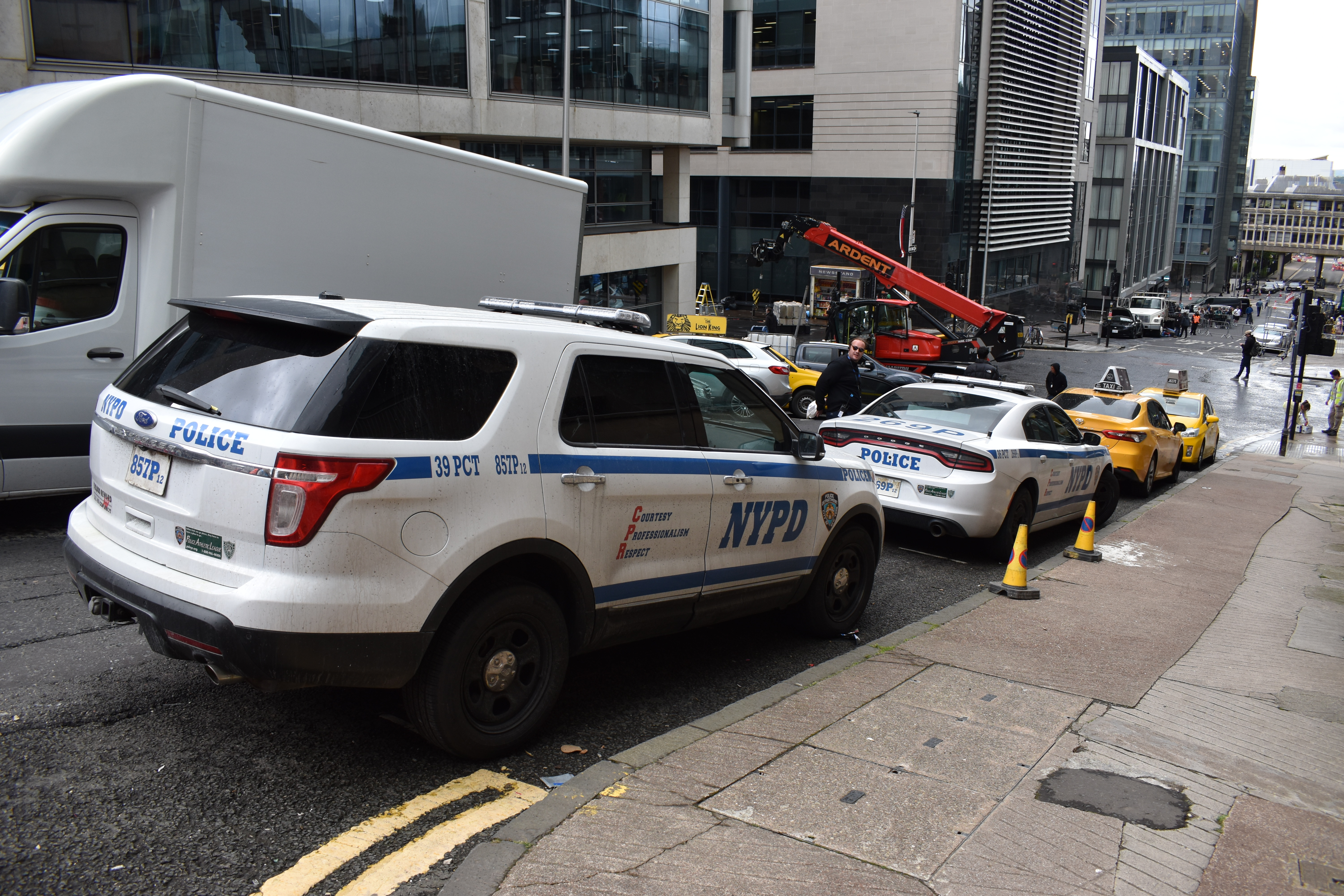
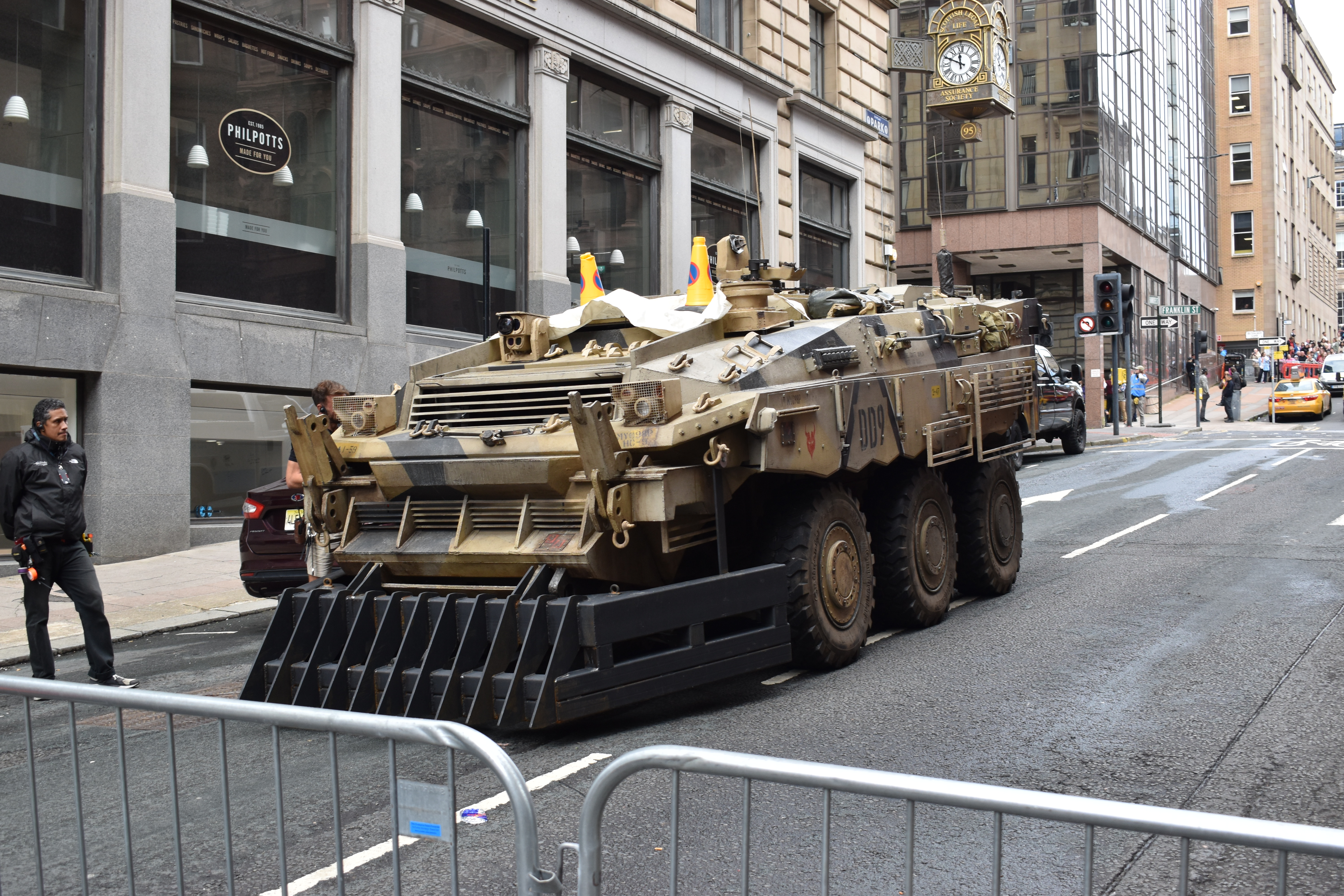
NYPD cars and NYC taxis (left) were featured in the Glasgow, Scotland, location shooting in August 2025, with the city standing in for New York City. An armored tank was also part of filming (right).

Bernthal was set to film his scenes back-to-back with One Last Kill, which finished filming in early August 2025. Production for Brand New Day was scheduled for around two weeks throughout Glasgow city centre—including Merchant City, George Square, and Trongate—for scenes set in New York, including the film's opening action sequence with the tank. Holland was excited to start principal photography with location shooting after production on No Way Home was restricted to soundstages due to the COVID-19 pandemic. He was glad fans could experience the start of filming with the cast and crew.

Filming took place at Brookwood Cemetery in Surrey, England, on August 7, 2025, for scenes of Parker visiting May's grave. These were some of the first non-stunt scenes filmed. After filming the cemetery shots they needed for the opening montage, Cretton asked Holland to do another take that could be used for the end of the film. Holland improvised a line about deciding not to go it alone anymore, which Cretton added to the film. He said this became their "north star", distilling the film to a core idea that they could work backward from. Tramell Tillman joined the cast at the end of August, as Bill Metzger, the head of the Department of Damage Control (DODC). Soundstage work took place at Pinewood for most of September. For the scene where Parker is bonding with Ned, Holland asked to stop filming because it did not feel organic and he felt it needed to be reworked; filming was stopped for the day and the actors all contributed ideas before Cretton and Kuritzkes rewrote the scene.

Filming took place in London's Battersea Park between early and mid-September 2025. On September 19, Holland suffered a mild concussion while filming a stunt on the Pinewood set, where filming was paused until September 29 while Holland recovered. Marvin Jones III was revealed to be portraying Lonnie Lincoln / Tombstone after voicing a version of the character in Sony's animated film Spider-Man: Into the Spider-Verse (2018). Filming took place at Fanum House in Basingstoke, England, with one of Holland's stunt doubles. Filming at Basingstoke continued in early October, with Holland joining the filming there, along with Mando. Later that month, Holland, Sink, and Ruffalo were seen filming at Senate House in London, which stood in for DODC headquarters. In early November, filming took place at Ravenscourt Park in London, for scenes related to Jean's backstory. Throughout November, filming took place at HM Prison Dorchester in Dorchester, England, for the abandoned prison where Parker fights the Hand. Other locations in the film include Hertford County Hall in Hertfordshire, standing in for Empire State University; and Turk's Shipyard at Chatham Historic Dockyard in Kent where Castle's safe house is located. Cretton announced on December 19, 2025, that filming had wrapped. Brand New Day is the first film to have sequences filmed specifically for the ScreenX format; manufacturer CJ 4DPlex shot additional footage to show on ScreenX's side screens.

Cretton designed several shots that recreate comic book covers or images, including Spider-Man swinging with a civilian from the character's debut comic Amazing Fantasy vol. 1 #15 (August 1962); Spider-Man fighting Tarantula from The Amazing Spider-Man vol. 1 #134 (July 1974); Spider-Man dodging Ramrod from The Amazing Spider-Man vol. 1 #221 (July 1981); Tombstone holding Spider-Man from the side of a building from The Spectacular Spider-Man vol. 1 #142 (May 1988); Spider-Man being attacked by Boomerang from The Amazing Spider-Man vol. 1 #345 (March 1991); Scorpion's tail striking Spider-Man from Spider-Man Adventures #2 (November 1994); and Castle carrying an injured Spider-Man from Civil War vol. 1 #5 (February 2006). Many of these shots appear in the opening montage that shows what Parker has been doing since the end of No Way Home. Cretton enjoyed imagining what happens before or after each of the comic images. Some of the shots were filmed at 420 frames per second, and Cretton said it was "virtually impossible" for an actor to perform at that rate. A shot of Spider-Man and the Hand jumping at each other required at least 65 takes. In contrast, Holland achieved the desired pose for the Scorpion shot in two or three takes.

=== Post-production ===
In January 2026, Justin Kroll from Deadline Hollywood reported that Feige had been solely focused on the production of Doomsday and Secret Wars for the last year, and had let Pascal handle much of the production for Brand New Day; Cretton disputed this. In addition to Feige and Pascal, other producers on the film included frequent Spider-Man film producer Avi Arad and Pascal's producing partner Rachel O'Connor.

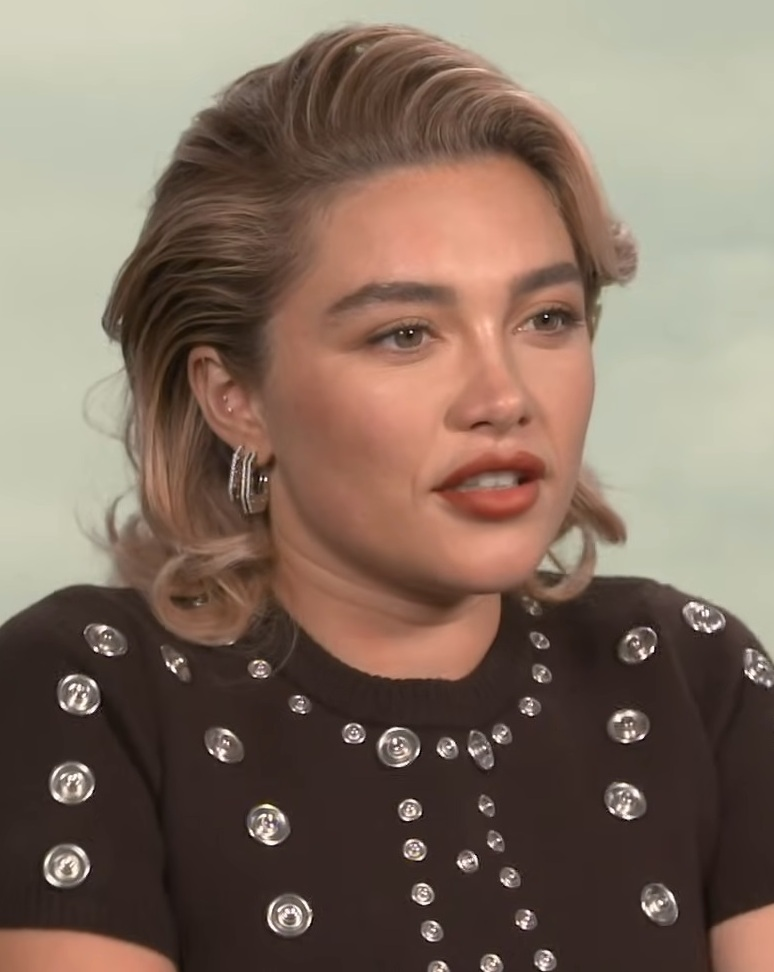
Florence Pugh reprised her MCU role of Yelena Belova / Black Widow. Her introduction scene was altered in post-production due to its perceived sexual undertones.

The first trailer was released in March, publicly revealing the Hand's return from the Marvel Netflix series; Zabryna Guevara reprising her role as Sheila Rivera from Born Again for a shot in which her character hands Spider-Man the key to New York City; Eman Esfandi as a new love interest for MJ; and Keith David as the narrator of a nature documentary about spiders. Feige indicated in mid-July that Florence Pugh would reprise her MCU role of Yelena Belova ahead of her appearance in Doomsday, which was confirmed at the end of the month. Pugh attributed her role in the film to Holland, who expressed interest in bringing their characters together while he was promoting No Way Home and that "started the ball rolling". Also in July, Rosario Dawson revealed that she reprised her role as Claire Temple from Marvel's Netflix series for a scene that had been cut from the final film. It showed her meeting Parker at a hospital after he fights Scorpion and before he seeks advice from Banner. Additionally, Marisa Tomei reprised her role as Parker's Aunt May from the previous trilogy in the film.

Brand New Day was edited by Nat Sanders, Gina Sansom, and Harry Yoon, all reuniting with Cretton from previous projects. Sanders and Sansom began work during pre-production and filming, working with Cretton on the previsualization process, with Yoon joining later. Several rounds of test screenings were held during the editing process. The first assembly cut was around 170 to 180 minutes and was edited down to 144 minutes. This was primarily done by reducing scenes, particularly action sequences, rather than cutting full scenes. Sanders and Sansom worked on the opening montage and tried to balance a fun opening with the sadness of Parker's situation. In April 2026, additional photography was taking place in London after the second test screening, adding new footage to clarify the connection between Parker's evolving abilities and his isolation, such as mentions of headaches and pain in his wrists early in the film. Holland said they were putting "icing on the cake", adding humor and incorporating a villain plotline in a new way. There was a cut that was influenced by the test screenings that he felt "totally didn't work", although Cretton said it was similar to the final version and had just been "overcut". Yelena's introduction, seemingly naked underwater in the bathhouse, was discussed for its perceived sexual undertones. The writers enjoyed how she was "putting [Parker] on his heels" in the scene, and the creative team felt it was appropriate for a more grown-up Spider-Man film. Adjustments were made in post-production to make the water more opaque in response to concerns from younger test screen viewers who found the scene uncomfortable.

The film's version of Marvel Studios' opening logo explains the impact of Strange's spell on MJ and Ned's memories. It includes scenes from the previous MCU Spider-Man films where Parker is with those characters, and shows him disappearing from the footage. This idea was suggested by Cretton in response to feedback from test audiences who were not familiar with the ending of No Way Home. For the main-on-end credits, they wanted the audience to sit with the film's ending and Parker's character growth rather than jump to a "fun and inventive main title" sequence, and Cretton wanted to reflect the themes of connection. The original suggestion was to show everyday people seeing Spider-Man swing by, which evolved to a simpler sequence that shows casual images of New York City, captured by director Lloyd Lee Choi for the film. After the credits, Ned's "Spidey Tracker" app is seen detecting a Spider-Man sighting away from Earth, leading to speculation about which future project it could be teasing.

Visual effects were supervised by Jerome Chen and provided by Sony Pictures Imageworks, Framestore, Industrial Light & Magic (ILM), Rise FX, Cantina Creative, Soho VFX, and SDFX Studios. The film's nearly 2,000 visual effects shots had to be created in a compressed 24-week schedule, with about three quarters of the shots being delivered in the final six weeks. Work included extending backgrounds, particularly anything above street level, with digital New York City buildings and elements. For footage showing Parker's face inside the Spider-Man mask, Holland wore a helmet with a camera mounted to it that captured his face in close-ups and the visual effects team added out-of-focus parts of the mask. Framestore contributed 342 shots, including those featuring Scorpion, the armored vehicle crashing into the DODC facility, the Silvercup rooftop scene, Spider-Man swinging to Castle's hideout and to MJ's apartment, the web cocoon, and parts of the final battle with the Hand. They painted out the wires and rigging used by the on-set stunt team for the Hand. Framestore worked on the look of Parker's webs, creating two distinct styles for his synthetic webs and his new organic webs. ILM handled the Hulk fight sequence, for which they were able to re-use their work from previous films for the Smart Hulk form, albeit aged-up slightly to match Ruffalo's appearance. The Savage Hulk form required more development work to get right, even with the new design provided by the design team, with experimentation done using different proportions, textures, colours, and more. Ruffalo's performance capture from set was used where possible, and the visual effects team flew to Rome where the actor was working on a different film to capture additional performance data for new shots that were added during post-production. The effects team made sure Spider-Man did not receive "too direct a shot too often" from the Hulk during the sequence, to make it believable that he was surviving the battle. ILM also worked on the climactic "Mindwave" sequence where Grey takes control of many people around the city. Chen was initially against using a rainbow-like chromatic aberration for the Mindwave effect, feeling that had been done too many times before for similar effects, but was unable to come up with a better approach in time and with five weeks to go he reluctantly agreed to use that approach.

== Music ==
Michael Giacchino was confirmed in December 2025 to be returning as composer from the previous MCU Spider-Man films. He removed some musical notes from his Spider-Man theme to represent the pieces of Parker's life that he has lost. A soundtrack album was released by Sony Classical on July 31, 2026. Ned's "Spidey Tracker" app uses the theme song from the animated series Spider-Man (1967–1970).

== Marketing ==
Cretton discussed the film at Sony's CinemaCon panel in March 2025, where Holland appeared via a video message to announce the title. Commentators noted the appropriateness of the title, considering the "Brand New Day" comic book storyline explores a reset for Spider-Man following the events of the 2007–2008 "One More Day" storyline. There was speculation about what impact the events of Doomsday would have on the film, and whether specific elements from "Brand New Day" would be adapted such as having Parker make a deal with Mephisto to resurrect Aunt May. Kevin Erdmann of Screen Rant said the "One More Day" and "Brand New Day" storylines were controversial, in part because they reverted Spider-Man's character growth and relationships. He felt the film could follow a similar storyline without undoing the character growth.

External videos
- YouTube videos from Sony Pictures Entertainment's channel
- Spider-Man: Brand New Day – Tom Holland New Suit Reveal presents a full look at Holland's Spider-Man suit for the film
- Spider-Man: Brand New Day – Day One on Set presents a behind-the-scenes look at the first day of production in Glasgow

On August 1, 2025—known as "Spider-Man Day"—Sony released an eight-second teaser showing glimpses of the new Spider-Man costume, featuring raised webbing similar to Maguire's suits, and the same faint hexagonal design on the red-and-blue fabric from Holland's previous suits. A 22-second teaser giving a full view of Holland in costume, directed by his brother Harry, was released the next day. Justin Carter at Gizmodo said the biggest change other than the raised webbing was the larger spider logo on the chest. Carter also noted the use of Giacchino's MCU Spider-Man theme in the teaser. Jordan Moreau at Variety said the full costume was closer to the comics than Holland's previous costumes, while McKinley Franklin of The Hollywood Reporter said it resembled the suits worn by Maguire and Garfield. On August 10, Sony released a behind-the-scenes video recapping the first day of filming. Variety's Jack Dunn felt Sony and Marvel had been generous with the amount of looks at the film so far.

The first trailer was released on March 18, 2026. Sony partnered with fans and content creators to release short clips of the trailer on the previous day. Tom Bacon at ComicBook.com compared this release strategy to a cast announcement livestream that Marvel Studios used for Doomsday the prior year, noting how both were intended to "maximize engagement" throughout the day. Rebecah Jacobs at Men's Journal and Kaitlyn Booth of Bleeding Cool both described the rollout as a scavenger hunt. Commentators noted that the footage includes the film's homage to the cover of Amazing Fantasy #15, and revealed that Parker's superpowers are mutating to include organic web shooters and black eyes. Some believed this was an adaptation of "The Other" or "The Six Arms Saga" from The Amazing Spider-Man vol. 1 #100–102 (1971). Sony said the trailer became the most-viewed ever, with 718.6 million views in 24 hours according to market research firm WaveMetrix. It surpassed the record for a film trailer, Deadpool & Wolverine's 365 million views, in eight hours, and surpassed the overall 24-hour record set by the video game Grand Theft Auto VI (2026). WaveMetrix further reported that the trailer surpassed 1.1 billion views within four days, the first film trailer to cross that threshold.

Rothman and Holland introduced footage from the film at CinemaCon in April 2026. A second trailer was released on June 17, which gave a better understanding of the film's plot according to Casey Loving at TheWrap. He highlighted the return of Banner's uncontrollable "Savage Hulk" persona, and noted the apparent narration from Marisa Tomei's May Parker. Commentators discussed the appearance of a mysterious hooded figure in the trailer, whom they believed to be Sink's character. WaveMetrix reported that, in one week, the second trailer gathered 590.8 million views, becoming the second most-viewed trailer of all time. Sony screened the first 18 minutes of the film at the CineEurope convention later that month. A final trailer was released on July 21. It largely contained footage from the three previous MCU Spider-Man films, which Germain Lussier from Gizmodo said worked well to establish the emotional stakes of Brand New Day. Bernthal presented a clip from the film at the 2026 San Diego Comic-Con in late July, showing Spider-Man and the Punisher fighting the Hulk.

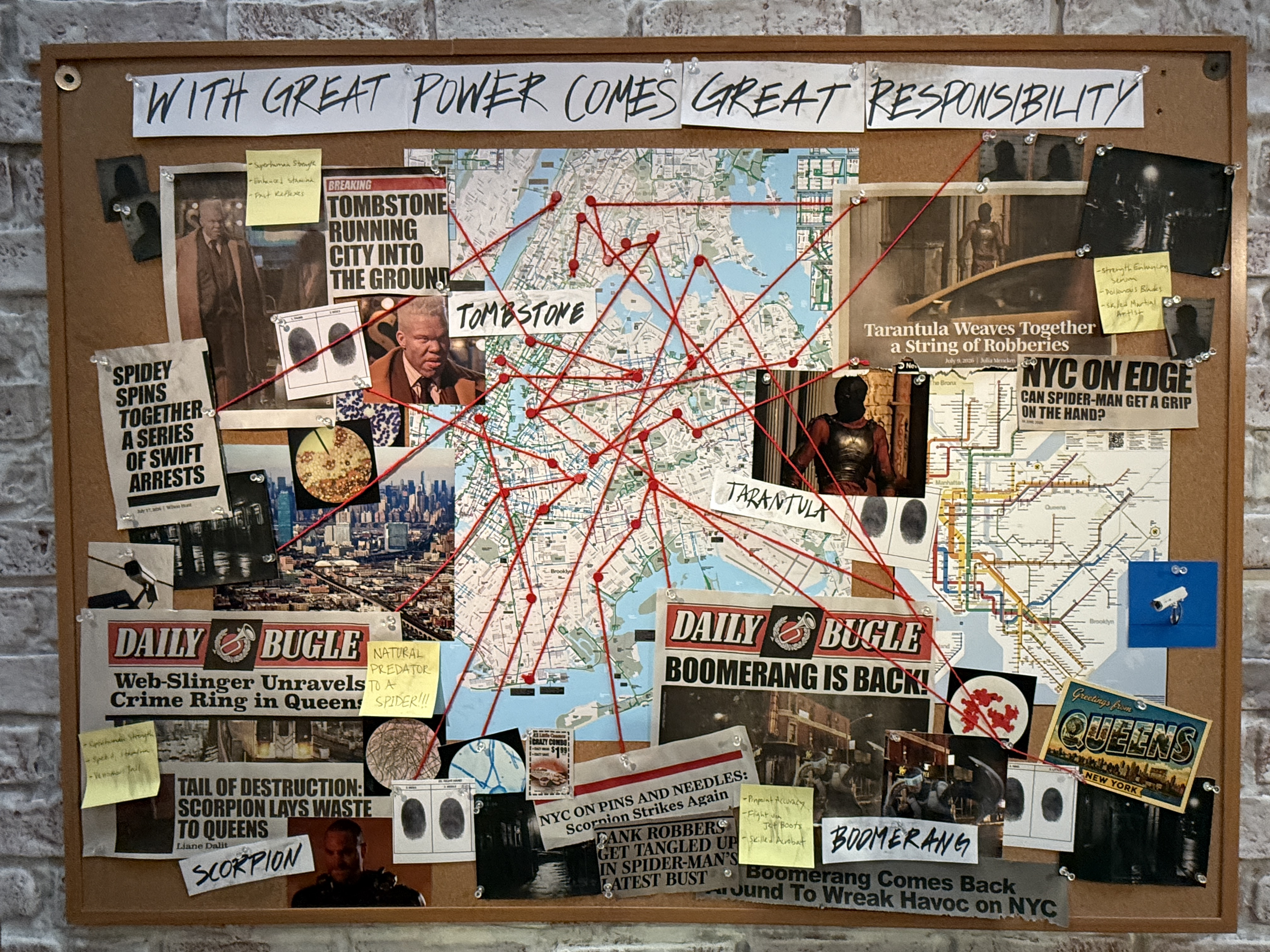
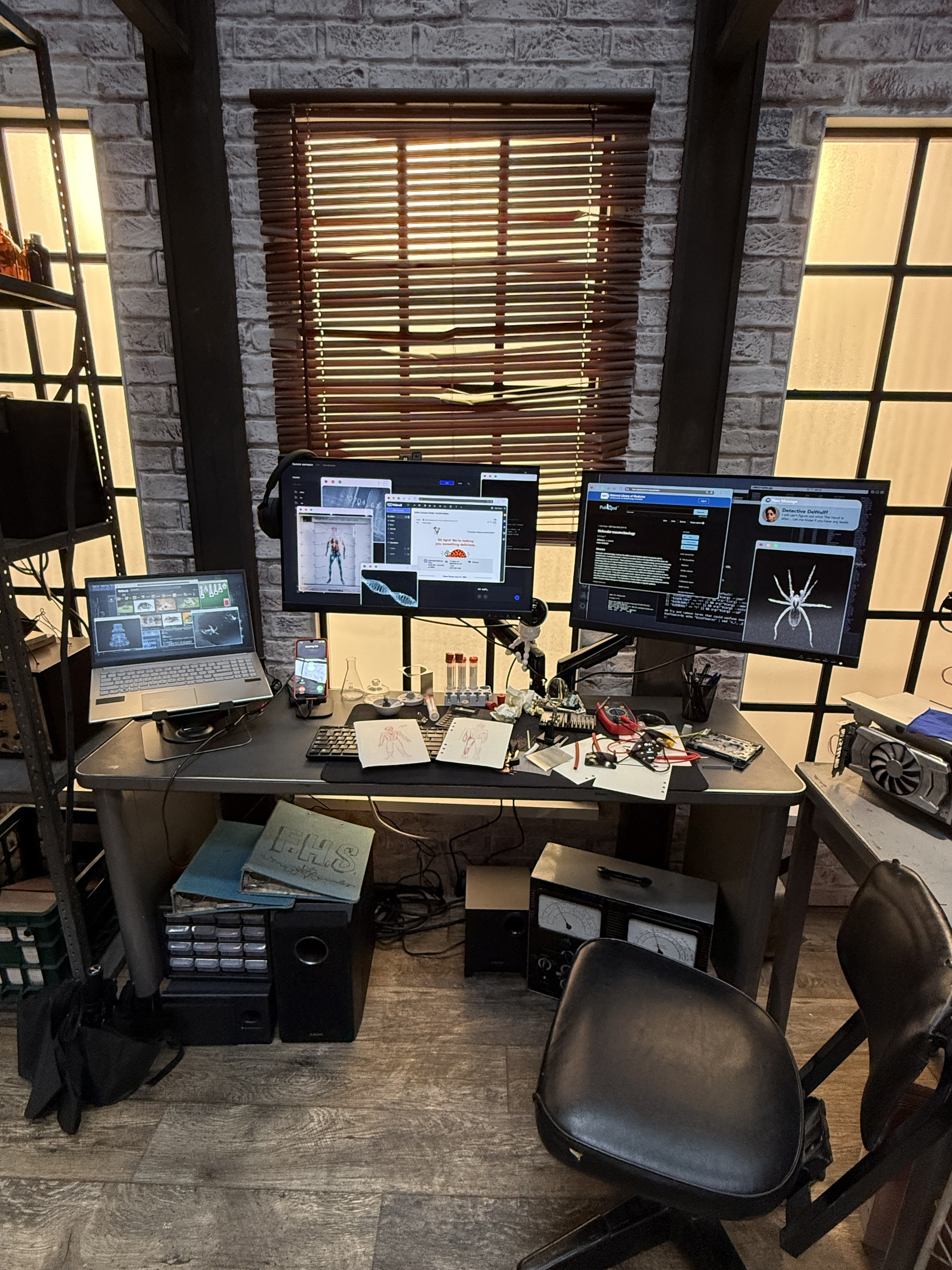
Sony and Little Caesars created a replica of Parker's apartment from Brand New Day as a fan experience, including his villain tracking board (left) and computer workstation (right).

The promotional campaign included $309 million worth of "media value" from promotional partners, the most ever for a film, surpassing the $288 million for Far From Home, with Little Caesars and McDonald's providing the most value. Sony partnered with 165 brands, with Little Caesars, Samsung, Asus, BMW (with their BMW iX3 and 5 Series Sedan), and Liquid I.V. receiving promotional placement within the film. On June 17, 2026, Samsung launched an online interactive fan experience of the Spidey Tracker, allowing fans to follow updates for the film and submit real-world Spider-Man sightings. On June 27, Sony and Little Caesars opened a replica of Parker's apartment as a fan experience in Greenpoint, Brooklyn. The space featured Easter eggs from the film, including a first look at Jones as Tombstone and the reveal of Colón-Zayas's role, and promoted Little Caesars' Spider-Man-inspired "Webberoni" Pizza. A Zillow listing was also created for the apartment. The experience received a "massive" 20,000 reservations to attend.

At the end of June 2026, Sony released a promotional video, in conjunction with the start of the 2026 FIFA World Cup knockout stage, that saw Argentina national football team player Lionel Messi meeting Parker in a café while searching for Spider-Man using the Spidey Tracker app. Commercials for Samsung and Liquid I.V., both featuring Batalon as Ned alongside Spider-Man, were released in mid-July. The Samsung commercial, promoting the eighth Galaxy Z series, was directed by Kasra Farahani with cinematography by Pawlak, while the Liquid I.V. commercial promoted the brand's limited-release flavors created for the film. Batalon, in character as Ned, and Spider-Man appeared at Samsung's July 2026 Galaxy Unpacked event in London to further promote the phones. A commercial for Major League Baseball (MLB) showed Spider-Man interacting with Juan Soto of the New York Mets and the team's mascot, Mr. Met, at Citi Field. The Spider-Man suit from Brand New Day, referred to as the "Fresh Start" suit, was added as a free update for the video game Marvel's Spider-Man 2 (2023) on July 28, with skins and accessories related to the film also being added to the video game Fortnite Battle Royale (2017). Brand New Day also partnered with Google for its Street View and Search, and TikTok's Spotlight program in 48 international markets. By the film's release, it had a social media reach of 2.86 billion according to social media analytics firm RelishMix, which was the most ever recorded, surpassing the 2.4 billion of Avengers: Endgame (2019).

== Release ==
=== Theatrical ===
Spider-Man: Brand New Day premiered at the Dolby Theatre in Hollywood, Los Angeles, on July 27, 2026. Distributed by Sony Pictures Releasing, the film's international release began on July 29. It opened in the majority of its markets, including the United Kingdom, over the next two days. In the United States, early screenings occurred for Amazon Prime members on July 29, before it opened on July 31 in 4,487 theaters. The film was released in premium large formats (PLFs) such as ScreenX, RealD 3D, D-Box, Dolby Cinema, and 4DX. It was also released in IMAX for select international markets, such as China, Japan, and Korea, but not in other markets where The Odyssey had exclusive use. Brand New Day was made available in IMAX globally starting August 6, sharing digital screens with The Odyssey while that film retained exclusive use of IMAX's 70 mm theaters. In September, Sony extended the film's theatrical run in the United States until November 16. An extended cut, subtitled [Brand New] Brand New Day, was announced in November for release on December 4. It features ten minutes of extra footage, including Dawson's appearance as Claire Temple that was cut from the original theatrical release. Commentators anticipated some of the additional footage would connect to Doomsday.

Brand New Day is part of Phase Six of the MCU. It was previously scheduled for release on July 24, one week after The Odyssey's debut, but it was delayed by a week to avoid contention with that film. Disney had intended to release an unspecified Marvel Studios film on July 24, but removed this from the company's release schedule in August 2024, which allowed Sony to schedule Brand New Day then.

=== Home media ===
Spider-Man: Brand New Day was released by Sony Pictures Home Entertainment on digital download on October 6, 2026, and will be released on Ultra HD Blu-ray, Blu-ray, and DVD on December 15. The home media releases feature a gag reel and featurettes.

In April 2021, Sony signed deals with Netflix and Disney for the rights to their 2022 to 2026 film slate, following the films' theatrical and home media windows. Netflix signed for exclusive "pay 1 window" streaming rights, which is typically an 18-month window and included future Spider-Man films following No Way Home. Disney signed for "pay 2 window" rights for the films, which would be streamed on Disney+ and Hulu as well as broadcast on Disney's linear television networks. In January 2026, Sony and Netflix announced a new agreement giving Netflix "pay 1 window" rights globally, an increase from just the United States, Germany, and Southeast Asia in the previous deal. The new agreement would begin later in 2026 as territory rights become available, before being fully in effect in early 2029.

== Reception ==
=== Box office ===
Spider-Man: Brand New Day grossed $959 million in the United States and Canada, and $1.565 billion in other territories, for a worldwide total of $2.524 billion. It is the third-highest-grossing film of all time; the highest-grossing film of all time in the United States and Canada; the highest-grossing film of 2026 worldwide, in the United States and Canada, and outside of the United States and Canada; and Sony's highest-grossing film of all time worldwide and in the United States and Canada. Its $932 million opening weekend was the second-best of all time behind Avengers: Endgame (2019). On August 3, it became the second-fastest film to gross $1 billion, doing so in six days. On August 16, it became the second-fastest film to gross $2 billion and the first Spider-Man film to do so.

==== United States and Canada ====
The film had the best first-day ticket pre-sales in five years since No Way Home in 2021, which had an estimated $78 million in pre-sales. Total pre-sales were $150 million, a record. It had the highest opening weekend gross of all time at $360 million, surpassing Endgame ($357.1 million). Wednesday and Thursday preview screenings accounted for $72 million, surpassing the record previously held by Endgame ($60 million). The opening day gross (including previews) of $169.8 million also surpassed Endgame's record ($157.4 million). The Saturday and Sunday grosses of $101.5 million and $88.7 million, respectively, were both second-best all-time to Endgame ($109.2 million and $90.3 million). Pre-release estimates had the film grossing $260–280 million in its opening weekend, with Sony estimating a $195 million opening. Its fourth and fifth days of release saw the highest Monday and Tuesday grosses of any film at $47 million and $42 million, respectively. The second weekend gross of $144 million was the third-biggest behind Endgame ($147 million) and Star Wars: The Force Awakens ($149 million), while its third weekend gross of $71 million was the second highest behind The Force Awakens ($90.2 million). The film remained top of the box office through its sixth weekend, and stayed in the top ten through its tenth weekend. It became the fastest film to reach cumulative grosses through $900 million. On September 15, it surpassed the $936 million gross of The Force Awakens to become the highest-grossing film of all time after 47 days of release.

==== Other territories ====
The film grossed $573 million its opening weekend, surpassing pre-release estimates of $275–300 million. It opened as the number one film in 66 box office markets, and had the highest-grossing opening weekend all-time in at least 11 countries, including France ($26.6 million), Brazil ($23.8 million), Spain ($15.6 million), and Peru ($8.6 million). In its second weekend, it remained the top film in most of its 67 markets. It surpassed $1 billion in 12 days, the second-fastest after Endgame. It became the highest-grossing Hollywood film in India. By its fourth weekend, Brand New Day had become the highest-grossing Sony film in 56 markets. As of September 13, 2026, the film's top-grossing markets include China ($233.0 million), the United Kingdom ($132 million), Mexico ($90.7 million), France ($86.5 million), and Brazil ($76.7 million).

=== Critical response ===
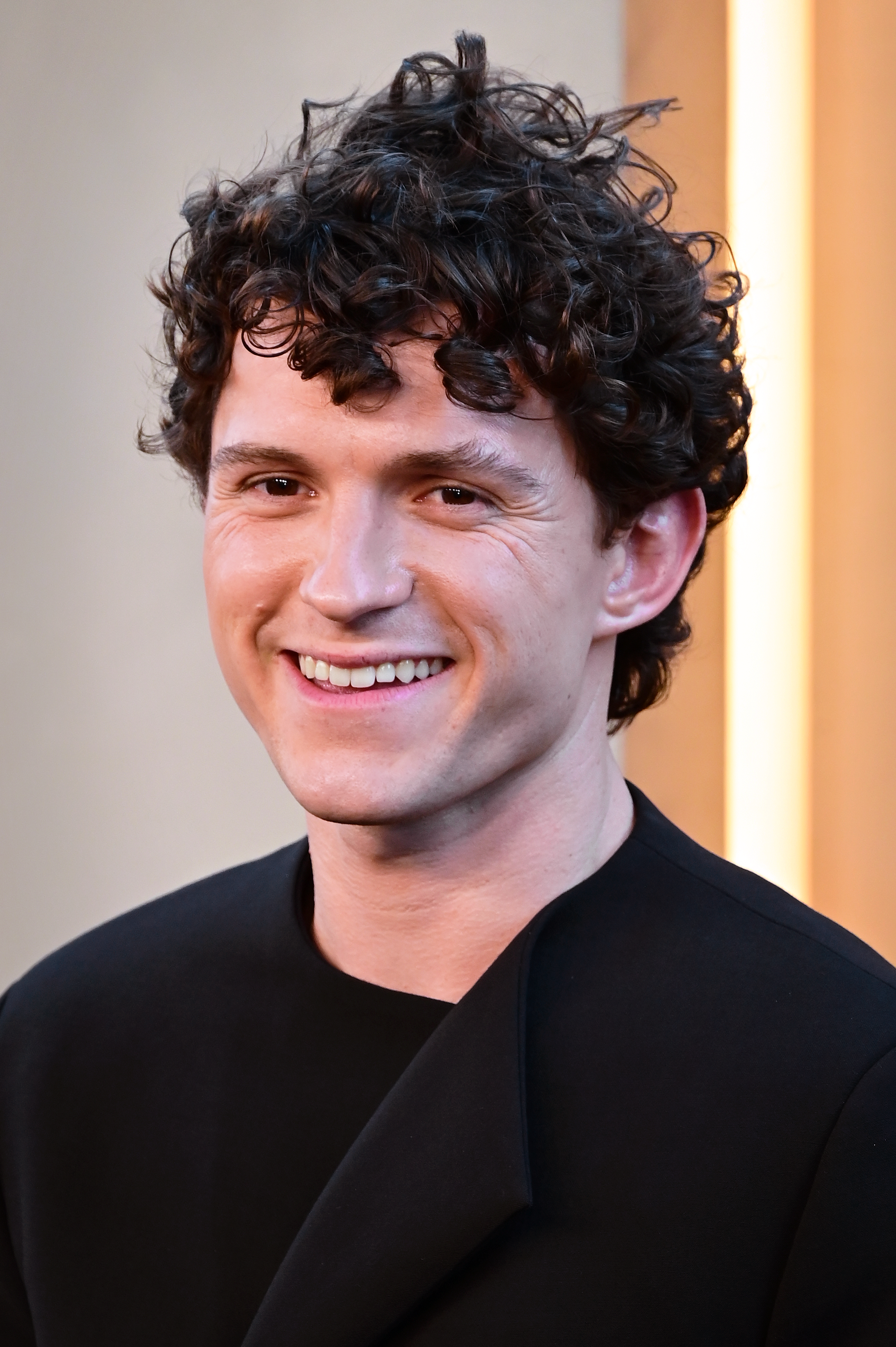
Tom Holland (pictured in July 2026) received praise for his performance.

Brand New Day received largely positive reviews from critics, with praise for Holland's performance, the action sequences, and the more mature, character-driven story compared to the previous MCU Spider-Man films. On review aggregator Rotten Tomatoes, 90% of 440 critics gave a positive review and the average of rated reviews was 7.6/10. The critics consensus reads, "Spinning a web of spectacular set pieces together with mature emotional stakes and Tom Holland's soulful performance, Brand New Day is a promising reset that portends Spidey will remain sticky on the big screen for years to come." Metacritic, which uses a weighted average, assigned a score of 66 out of 100 based on 56 critics, indicating "generally favorable" reviews. Audiences polled by CinemaScore gave the film an average grade of "A" on an A+ to F scale, while 88% of those surveyed by PostTrak said they would definitely recommend the film.

Pete Hammond for Deadline Hollywood called Brand New Day a "dark and thrilling new chapter" for the franchise, praising Holland's performance, Cretton's direction, and the film's balance of character drama and superhero action. Owen Gleiberman at Variety praised the film for its action, villain, and Holland's performance, but described the film as "arduous", "clunkily episodic", and "half an hour too long", arguing that it is more self-serious than emotionally involving. Peter Bradshaw for The Guardian praised the ambitious tone, strong performances and emotional focus, particularly highlighting Zendaya and Holland's chemistry. However, he found the film uneven, with some familiar superhero elements limiting its impact.

William Bibbiani of TheWrap praised Brand New Day as "a fantastic film about Peter Parker" and "one of the highlights of the whole franchise", commending its emotional, character-driven story and the performances of Holland and Bernthal, despite criticizing the villain's plan as illogical. Empire's John Nugent gave the film four out of five stars, praising its grounded, comic-faithful approach and Holland's performance, describing Spider-Man as "still Marvel's ace in the pack", while noting that the second half loses momentum due to unnecessary ties to the wider MCU. David Rooney of The Hollywood Reporter praised Cretton's direction for balancing "adrenaline and feeling", while highlighting "the humanity that has always been Spidey's greatest strength", Holland's "never-better" performance, and the film's emotional focus on Peter, though he criticized occasional pacing issues and plot convolutions.

David Ehrlich at IndieWire gave the film a C−, describing it as a "dull and downbeat action sequel" that "causes more problems than it cures", criticizing its pacing, its reliance on MCU setup, and its failure to meaningfully advance Peter's story, although he praised Holland's performance and considered Cretton "a more sure-footed stylist" than Watts. David Fear for Rolling Stone criticized the film for relying too heavily on fan service, MCU crossovers and franchise setup at the expense of Spider-Man's story, arguing that Peter risks becoming "a supporting player in his own movie", while praising Holland's performance and the emotional scenes between Peter and MJ.

=== Accolades ===
Accolades received by Spider-Man: Brand New Day
Award	Date of ceremony	Category	Recipient	Result	Ref.
Astra Midseason Movie Awards	June 30, 2026	Most Anticipated Film	Spider-Man: Brand New Day	Nominated	
Nickelodeon Kids' Choice Awards	November 14, 2026	Favorite Movie	Spider-Man: Brand New Day	Won	
Nickelodeon Kids' Choice Awards	November 14, 2026	Favorite Movie Actor	Tom Holland	Won	
Nickelodeon Kids' Choice Awards	November 14, 2026	Favorite Movie Actress	Zendaya	Won	
Nickelodeon Kids' Choice Awards	November 14, 2026	Favorite Villain	Sadie Sink	Won	
Hollywood Music in Media Awards	November 18, 2026	Best Original Score – Sci-Fi/Fantasy Film	Michael Giacchino	Nominated	

By mid-November 2026, Sony Pictures planned to campaign for the film to receive a nomination for Best Picture at the 99th Academy Awards, hiring awards consultants and planning a "robust" global screening strategy, along with multiple For Your Consideration events.

== Future ==
Pascal stated in November 2021 that Brand New Day was planned to be the first film in a new Spider-Man trilogy starring Holland. In early 2026, Holland revisited his previous comments about not wanting to play Spider-Man past the age of 30 and hoping to pass the mantle to another actor. Since the latter had not yet happened by his 30th birthday, Holland said he may need to "change the quote to 37" and added that "playing Spider-Man has been the joy of my life... I'll do it for as long as they'll have me." In July, Holland said he had a clear vision for how he wanted to pass the mantle. Feige said Miles Morales would be introduced in live-action following the release of the animated film Spider-Man: Beyond the Spider-Verse (2027), and he had discussed ideas for the next five live-action Spider-Man films with Pascal. The latter hoped Cretton would be involved in future films, and Cretton said he was open to directing another. Following Brand New Day's release, Rothman said there had not yet been concrete discussions about Holland returning for a fifth film, while Feige said Holland and Zendaya would be taking a break before any new plans were confirmed.
