= Rina Yang =

British cinematographer (born 1986)

- Born: 1986 (age 39–40)
- Education: Met Film School (BA)
- Occupation: Cinematographer
- Years active: 2010–present
- Organisation: British Society of Cinematographers
- Website: rinayang.com

Rina Yang BSC (born 1986) is a British cinematographer based in London. She became the first Asian woman to join the British Society of Cinematographers and was named a 2020 BAFTA Breakthrough. She was also the first woman cinematographer to be nominated for a BAFTA Cymru for fiction. She won a VMA for her work on Taylor Swift's "Anti-Hero".

== Early life ==
Born to a Korean family, Yang grew up in Japan. As a creative child, her mother encouraged her to take up still life and portrait painting; she became interested in film at 16. Yang initially intended to study economics at university, but was inspired to leave Japan at 20 by a friend who lived in England and pursue a creative field. She graduated from the Met Film School with a Bachelor of Arts (BA) in Practical Filmmaking, awarded by the University of West London.

== Career ==
From 2012 to 2015, Yang began her career doing music videos for a number of folk, rock and electric artists. Her portfolio expanded significantly in 2016 to the likes of Corrine Bailey Rae, Blossoms and FKA Twigs. This included Raye's music video "I U US" directed by Charli XCX. The following year, Yang reunited with Raye for "You Don't Know Me" with Jax Jones and with FKA Twigs for one of several Nike campaigns Yang worked on. Yang also worked with artists such as Dua Lipa, Zara Larsson, Niall Horan, and Björk, and Sam Fender across 2017 and 2018.

Yang was credited with additional photography on the Channel 4 comedy-drama The End of the F***ing World (2017), marking her first television project, and had her first feature film project as second unit director of photography on the biopic Bohemian Rhapsody (2018). She earned a BAFTA Cymru nomination for her work on the Through the Gates installment of the anthology On the Edge (2018).

In 2019, Yang worked on three episodes of the Netflix crime drama Top Boy for its third series. She reunited with FKA Twigs for the music videos "Cellophane" and "Home with You", Charli XCX for "2099" with Troye Sivan, as well as Dua Lipa in 2020 for two tracks with Madonna. Yang filmed Stella Corradi's BBC One film Sitting in Limbo (2020) on the Windrush scandal as well as Nadia Hallgren's documentary Becoming.

Yang appeared on the British Vogue list of 12 Young Creatives in 2021 and joined the British Society of Cinematographers (BSC) in 2022. Yang began working with Taylor Swift on All Too Well: The Short Film (2021), earning Yang her MTV VMA nomination. Yang was invited back for Swift's Midnights music videos the following year and won a VMA for "Anti-Hero". Also in 2022, she gained prominence as cinematographer of an episode of the HBO drama Euphoria and Nikyatu Jusu's psychological horror film Nanny. Yang further went into film with The Fire Inside (2024), for which she earned an Independent Spirit Award nomination.

== Artistry ==
In an interview, Yang named the Coen brothers' Fargo (1996), Hayao Miyazaki's My Neighbour Totoro (1988), Yasujirō Ozu's Tokyo Story (1953), and Wong Kar-wai's Chungking Express (1994) as some of her favourite films.

== Personal life ==
As of 2019, Yang was based in Clapton, East London.

== Filmography ==
=== Film ===
Year	Title	Director	Notes
2016	Lost Youth	Taichi Kimura	Short film
2017	Baby Mine	Nour Wazzi	Short film
2018	Bohemian Rhapsody		As second unit d.o.p
2019	Kiss of the Rabbit God	Andrew Thomas Huang	Short film
2020	Becoming	Nadia Hallgren	Documentary
2020	Actress	Daisy Lewis	Short film
2022	Nanny	Nikyatu Jusu	
2024	The Fire Inside	Rachel Morrison	
2025	O'Dessa	Geremy Jasper	
2026	Mother Mary	David Lowery	With Andrew Droz Palermo
2027	Get Lite	Teyana Taylor	

=== Television ===
Year	Title	Director	Notes
2017	The End of the F***ing World	Jonathan Entwistle	2 episodes; as additional photography
2018	On the Edge	Stella Corradi	Anthology: Through the Gates
2019	Top Boy	Aneil Karia	3 episodes
2020	Sitting in Limbo	Stella Corradi	Television film
2021	Super. Human.		Short
2022	Euphoria	Sam Levinson	Episode: "A Thousand Little Trees of Blood"

=== Music videos ===
Song	Year	Artist	Notes
"Life Size Ghosts"	2012	Mt Wolf	
"Shapeshift"	2013	Mt Wolf	
"Hypoflight"	2013	Mt Wolf	
"The Village"	2013	Tunng	
"Midnight Shallows"	2013	Mt Wolf	
"Nothing Stays the Same"	2014	Luke Sital-Singh	
"Last Orders"	2014	Nothing but Thieves	
"Who You Love"	2014	Kindess feat Robyn	
"I'll Be Back"	2015	Kindness	
"Bad Boyfriend"	2015	Spector	
"Red"	2015	Mt Wolf	
"Till the End"	2015	Lucy Rose	
"Love the Jobs You Hate"	2015	Honne	
"London Bars"	2015	Chase & Status	
"It Gets Cold"	2015	Eliza and the Bear	
"Be Apart"	2016	Porches	
"Green Aphrodisiac"	2016	Corinne Bailey Rae	
"In My Car"	2016	Gold Panda	
"Kicks"	2016	Lauren Aquilina	
"All Four Walls"	2016	Gorgon City feat Vaults	
"Milk & Honey"	2016	Billie Marten	
"At Night"	2016	MNEK	
"Charlemagne"	2016	Blossoms	
"Weekend"	2016	Louis the Child and Icona Pop	
"UDSM"	2016	Kloe	
"Liability"	2016	Kloe	
"Good Together"	2016	Honne	
"I, U, US"	2016	Raye	Directed by Charli XCX
"Not Gonna Break Me"	2016	Jamie N. Commons	
"Prima Donna"	2016	Vince Staples	
"Take Me for a Ride"	2016	Holy Oysters	
"ROOMs"	2016	FKA Twigs	
"Copper Kiss"	2016	Sälen	
"Garden"	2016	Emeli Sandé	
"Dye My Hair"	2016	Alma	
"Scared to Be Lonely"	2017	Martin Garrix and Dua Lipa	
"Thinking 'Bout You"	2017	Dua Lipa	
"In the Morning"	2017	Nao	
"You Don't Know Me"	2017	Jax Jones feat Raye	
"On My Mind"	2017	Disciples	
"Don't Let Me Be Yours"	2017	Zara Larsson	
"Sun of Jean"	2017	Loyle Carner	
"Too Much to Ask"	2017	Niall Horan	
"Arisen My Senses"	2017	Björk	
"In My View"	2018	Young Fathers	
"Blue Lights"	2018	Jorja Smith	
"Street Fighter Mas"	2018	Kamasi Washington	
"Dead Boys"	2018	Sam Fender	As camera operator
"Pure Water"	2018	Skepta	
"Cellophane"	2019	FKA Twigs	Live at the Wallace Collection
"2099"	2019	Charli XCX feat Troye Sivan	
"Home With You"	2019	FKA Twigs	
"Rocket Fuel"	2019	DJ Shadow feat De La Soul	
"Levitating (The Blessed Madonna Remix)"	2020	Dua Lipa feat Madonna	
"Club Future Nostalgia"	2020	Dua Lipa feat Madonna	
"Diamonds"	2020	Sam Smith	
"Savior Complex"	2020	Phoebe Bridgers	
All Too Well: The Short Film	2021	Taylor Swift	
"Anti-Hero"	2022	Taylor Swift	
"Bejeweled"	2022	Taylor Swift	
"Lavender Haze"	2023	Taylor Swift	
"Training Season"	2024	Dua Lipa	
"All over me"	2025	Haim	
"Gorgeous"	2025	Doja Cat	

== Awards and nominations ==
Year	Award	Category	Work	Result	Ref.
2019	BAFTA Cymru	Best Photography and Lighting	Through the Gates	Nominated	
2022	MTV Video Music Awards	Best Cinematography	All Too Well: The Short Film	Nominated	
2023	MTV Video Music Awards	Best Cinematography	"Anti-Hero"	Won	
2023	Girls on Film Awards	Best Cinematographer	Nanny	Nominated	
2024	British Arrows		Nike campaign	Bronze	
2024	Camerimage	Golden Frog for Best Cinematography	The Fire Inside	Nominated	
2025	Independent Spirit Awards	Best Cinematography	The Fire Inside	Nominated	
