= Ryan Destiny =

American actress, singer and songwriter (born 1995)

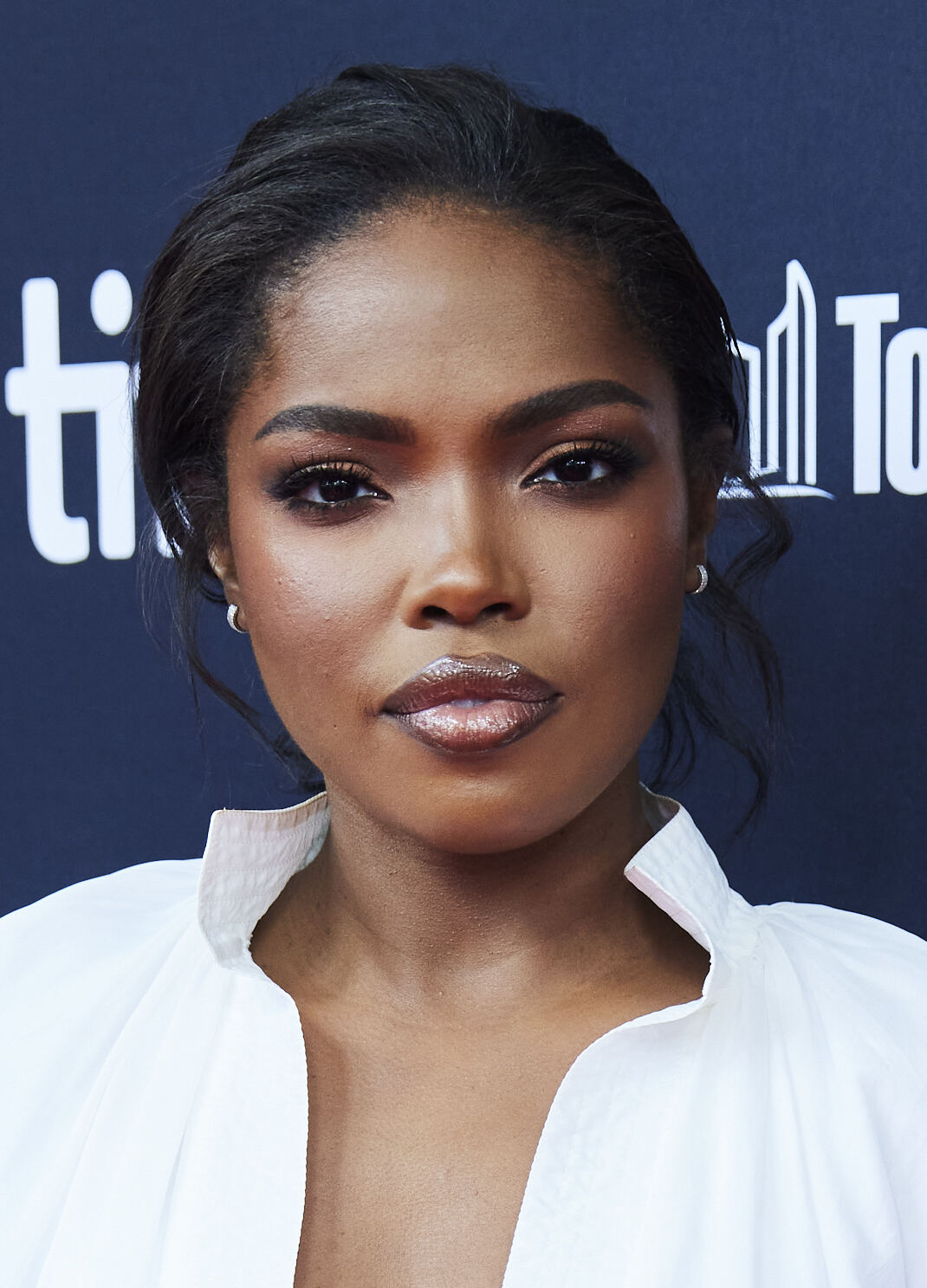
- Destiny at the 2024 Toronto International Film Festival
- Born: Ryan Destiny Irons; January 8, 1995 (age 31); Detroit, Michigan, U.S.
- Occupations: Actress; singer-songwriter; dancer; model
- Years active: 2010–present
- Partner(s): Keith Powers (2017–2022; 2022–present, engaged)
- Parent(s): Deron Irons; Dawn Irons
- Musical career
- Instrument: Vocals
- Years active: 2007–present
- Formerly of: Love Dollhouse

Ryan Destiny Irons (born January 8, 1995) is an American actress, singer, and songwriter. Destiny is best known for her roles in the Fox TV musical drama Star, the Freeform sitcom Grown-ish, and as the two-time Olympic gold medal-winning boxer Claressa Shields in the Claressa Shields biopic, The Fire Inside (2024) directed by Rachel Morrison.

== Early life and education ==
Destiny was born in Detroit, Michigan. Her father is a member of the 1990s R&B group Guesss. Destiny attended West Bloomfield High School. In January 2011, Destiny won a singing contest to attend the red carpet premiere of Justin Bieber's Never Say Never.

== Career ==
=== Music ===
In junior high school, 12-year-old Destiny formed a musical trio group called New Limit. Managed by her mother Dawn, the trio auditioned for America's Got Talent in 2010, and they made it to the finals until they decided it was not for them. By 2011, Destiny had signed with Universal Republic. The group would later split, with Destiny and her manager holding auditions forming a new group called Love Dollhouse. The trio signed to All Def/Capitol Records, a label partnership with Russell Simmons, Steve Rifkind, and Brian Robbins. The group released their debut single, "Can I" in 2014, but disbanded a year later in 2015.

In 2016 and later again in 2018, Destiny announced plans for a solo debut EP titled "On One's Own." She released its lead single "The Same" in 2018, with a remix featuring rapper Tobi Lou the following year. Her second single "Do You" was released in 2020. Her other songs include "How Many" (2022), "Lie Like That," (2023), a cover of Khamari's 2021 song, "Doctor, My Eyes" in 2024, and "How Your Hands Feel" (2024).

On July 6, 2026, Destiny performed in an Aaliyah tribute, curated by Missy Elliott, for the finale at that year's Essence Festival of Culture.

=== Acting ===
In 2010, Destiny appeared in an episode of the web series The Wannabes Starring Savvy. In 2011, she traveled to Los Angeles with her mother to start auditioning for projects. In 2013, she appeared in several episodes of the Detroit-based crime drama, Low Winter Sun. Destiny later appeared as the lead in the independent film A Girl Like Grace opposite Garcelle Beauvais, Meagan Good, and Raven-Symoné. The Ty Hodges produced film premiered at the Los Angeles Film Festival in June 2015.

Destiny initially booked the role of Tiana on Lee Daniels's hit musical drama Empire but due to her contract with All Def Music, she could not accept the role. In December 2015, Destiny booked one of the lead roles as Alexandra "Alex" Crane in Daniels' series Star – opposite Queen Latifah. The series premiered on Fox on December 14, 2016, and was canceled after 3 seasons in 2019.

In November 2019, it was announced that Destiny was cast to play Claressa Shields in Flint Strong, a sports biopic written by Barry Jenkins and directed by Rachel Morrison. Originally, it was in development at Universal Pictures. However, the film was put in a turnaround in October 2021. It was then picked up by Metro-Goldwyn-Mayer in May 2022 and later renamed The Fire Inside.

Destiny also had a recurring role on season 3 of Grown-ish as Jillian, a transfer student from Spelman College.

== Influences ==
Destiny cites entertainers Michael Jackson, Freddie Mercury, Prince and Aaliyah as her primary influences. Destiny has also expressed admiration for singers such as Lauryn Hill, Brandy, India Arie, and Beyoncé.

== Personal life ==
Ryan Destiny was in a relationship with actor Keith Powers from 2017 until their split in 2022. They remained close friends, and in December 2024, during an interview with The Breakfast Club radio show while promoting The Fire Inside, Destiny confirmed that the breakup was "just a [little] bump in the road," and the two have since gotten back together. The couple are now currently engaged since October 5, 2025.

== Filmography ==
=== Film ===
Year	Title	Role	Notes
2015	A Girl Like Grace	Grace	Lead role
2023	Oracle	Shay	Lead role
2024	The Fire Inside	Claressa Shields	Lead role

=== Television ===
Year	Title	Role	Notes
2010	The Wannabes-Starring Savvy	Customer	
2013	Low Winter Sun	April Geddes	Recurring role (6 episodes)
2016–2019	Star	Alexandra Crane	Lead role
2020–2021	Grown-ish	Jillian	Recurring role
2021	The Lower Bottoms	Rebecca Cooper	Main role

=== Music videos ===
- Big Sean – "Paradise" (2014)
- Big Sean – "Single Again" (2019)
- Halsey — "Nightmare" (2019)
- Justin Bieber ft. Chance the Rapper – "Holy" (2020)
- Doja Cat – "Need to Know" (2021)

== Awards and nominations ==
Year	Award	Category	Work	Result
2017	Teen Choice Awards	Choice Breakout TV Star	Herself	Nominated
2018	Teen Choice Awards	Choice Drama TV Actress	Herself	Nominated
2019	Teen Choice Awards	Choice Drama TV Actress	Herself	Nominated
2024	Denver International Film Festival	Rising Star Award	The Fire Inside	Won
2024	Gotham Awards	Breakthrough Performer	The Fire Inside	Nominated
2024	Celebration of Cinema and Television	Rising Star Award – Film	The Fire Inside	Won
2024	Michigan Movie Critics Guild	MMC Award for Film Excellence	The Fire Inside	Won
2025	Indie Spirit Awards	Best Lead Performance	The Fire Inside	Nominated
2025	Black Reel Awards	Outstanding Lead Performance	The Fire Inside	Nominated
2025	Black Reel Awards	Outstanding Breakthrough Performance	The Fire Inside	Nominated
2025	NAACP Image Awards	Outstanding Breakthrough Performance in a Motion Picture	The Fire Inside	Nominated
