= Sean Noel Walker =

American visual effects artist

- Occupation: Visual effects artist

Sean Noel Walker is a New Zealand visual effects artist. He was nominated for an Academy Award in the category Best Visual Effects for the film Shang-Chi and the Legend of the Ten Rings.

== Selected filmography ==
- Shang-Chi and the Legend of the Ten Rings (2021; co-nominated with Christopher Townsend, Joe Farrell and Dan Oliver)
