= Idoko =

Idoko is a surname. Notable people with this surname includes:

- Candy Idoko (born 1985), Nigerian former professional tennis player
- Ene Franca Idoko (born 1985), Nigerian sprinter
- Zephani Idoko (born 1994), Nigerian-American actress
