= Harry Yoon =

South Korean-born American film editor

- Born: South Korea
- Occupation: Film editor
- Years active: 2003–present

Harry Yoon, ACE, is a South Korean-born American film editor. He is known for his work on Minari (2020), Spider-Man: Brand New Day (2026), and the Netflix Series Beef: Season 1 (2023).

== Early life and education ==
Harry was born in Seoul, South Korea, and immigrated to the U.S. with his parents when he was five years old. He grew up in San Leandro, California, and graduated from Williams College in 1993. He later attended New York University's graduate directing program before pursuing a career in film editing.

== Career ==
Yoon began working in film and television in the early 2000s, editing short films and documentaries before moving into feature films and television series. He worked in visual effects editing on productions including The Hunger Games (2012), Zero Dark Thirty (2012), and The Revenant (2015). He subsequently worked as an editor on films including Detroit (2017), directed by Kathryn Bigelow, and The Best of Enemies (2019).

In 2020, Yoon edited Minari, directed by Lee Isaac Chung. The film follows a Korean American family seeking to establish a farm in rural Arkansas. Yoon worked closely with Chung to structure the film around family life, balancing the experiences of the parents and children. His editing helped shape the film's elliptical narrative and the relationships between its characters. Minari received the Grand Jury Prize and Audience Award in the U.S. Dramatic Competition at the 2020 Sundance Film Festival and subsequently received several major awards and nominations including six Academy Award nominations for Best Picture, Director, Screenplay, and Score. Korean Actress Youn Yuh-Jung won the Oscar for Best Supporting Actress for her performance as the grandmother Soon-ja.

Yoon later edited Shang-Chi and the Legend of the Ten Rings (2021), directed by Destin Daniel Cretton, and worked on the first season of the HBO series Euphoria (2019). In 2023, he shared editing duties with Laura Zempel on the Netflix series Beef. He also edited The Fire Inside (2024), directed by Rachel Morrison, and Marvel Studio's Thunderbolts*: The New Avengers (2025), directed by Jake Schreier. His subsequent feature credits include Michael (2026), directed by Antoine Fuqua.

== Filmography ==
Year	Title	Contribution	Notes
2003	Fast Cars & Babies	Editor	Short film
2003	Little Red Light	Editor	Short film
2004	Winning the Peace	Editor	Short film
2004	Good Thing	Editor	Short film
2005	Dogged on Dogtown	Editor	Documentary
2005	Starz Special: On the Set of 'Flightplan'	Editor	Documentary
2008	California King	Editor	Short film
2008	Half-Life	Editor	Feature film
2009	The Pit	Editor	Documentary
2011	Let Go	Editor	Feature film
2011	Admissions	Editor	Short film
2011	Detroit 1-8-7	Editor	TV series
2012	Karrabing! Low Tide Turning	Editor	Short film
2013	Welcome to the Jungle	Editor	Feature film
2014	The Newsroom	Editor	TV series
2014	This Is What Remains	Editor	TV movie
2014	Isa	Editor	TV movie
2014	Drunktown's Finest	Editor	Feature film
2016	Mars Project	Editor	TV movie
2017	Mission Control	Editor	TV movie
2017	Detroit	Editor	Feature film
2017	Pillow Talk	Editor	TV series
2019	Euphoria	Editor	TV series
2019	The Best of Enemies	Editor	Feature film
2020	Minari	Editor	Feature film
2021	Shang-Chi and the Legend of the Ten Rings	Editor	Feature film
2023	Beef	Editor	TV series
2024	The Fire Inside	Editor	Feature film
2025	Thunderbolts*	Editor	Feature film
2026	Michael	Editor	Feature film
2026	Spider-Man: Brand New Day	Editor	Feature film

== Awards and nominations ==
Year	Award	Result	Category	Work	Ref.
2018	American Cinema Editors	Nominated	Best Edited Feature Film	Minari	
2021	Satellite Awards	Nominated	Best Film Editing	Minari	
