= Nanny (film) =

2022 film by Nikyatu Jusu

- Official release poster
- Directed by: Nikyatu Jusu
- Written by: Nikyatu Jusu
- Produced by: Nikkia Moulterie; Daniela Taplin Lundberg
- Starring: Anna Diop; Michelle Monaghan; Sinqua Walls; Morgan Spector; Rose Decker; Leslie Uggams
- Cinematography: Rina Yang
- Edited by: Robert Mead
- Music by: Tanerélle; Bartek Gliniak
- Production companies: Stay Gold Features; Mouth of a Shark; Topic Studios; LinLay Productions; Blumhouse Television
- Distributed by: Amazon Studios
- Release dates: January 22, 2022 (Sundance); November 23, 2022 (United States)
- Running time: 98 minutes
- Country: United States
- Languages: English; Wolof

Nanny is a 2022 American psychological horror drama film written and directed by Nikyatu Jusu, in her feature directorial debut. The film stars Anna Diop, Michelle Monaghan, Sinqua Walls, Morgan Spector, Rose Decker, and Leslie Uggams. Jason Blum serves as an executive producer through his Blumhouse Television banner.

Nanny had its world premiere at the Sundance Film Festival on January 22, 2022, where it won the Grand Jury Prize, making it the first horror film to ever win this award at Sundance. The film was given a limited theatrical release on November 23, 2022, by Amazon Studios, prior to streaming on Prime Video on December 16, 2022.

== Plot ==
Aisha is an undocumented Senegalese immigrant in New York City. She left her now six-year-old son, Lamine, in the care of her cousin, Mariatou, in Senegal a year earlier. She hopes to earn enough money to bring her son and cousin as immigrants to the United States to live with her.

Aisha is hired as a nanny for Rose, the young daughter of Amy and Adam Hav, a wealthy white couple who live on Manhattan's Upper East Side. She and Rose become very close, while Amy and Adam are distracted by their careers, often causing Aisha to have to stay late – or even overnight – when neither parent returns home.

Aisha attracts the attention of Malik, the doorman at the Havs' apartment building. They soon begin a relationship, to the approval of Kathleen, Malik's grandmother, and Bishop, his son, who is roughly Lamine's age. Kathleen and Aisha share an undercurrent of magical perception.

The Havs are often remiss in paying Aisha, which delays her being able to cover airfare for Lamine and Mariatou. Adam offers to assist her and instead makes sexual advances towards her to which places her in turmoil. She begins having dreams of drowning, as well as waking visions of Lamine.

Amy leaves the family with no notice, leaving Aisha to stay full time while Adam tries to sort things out. Alone with Rose one evening, Aisha begins having visions and Rose seemingly disappears from the apartment. When she hears voices, she grabs a knife from the kitchen and checks the bathroom, where she is mysteriously pulled into the full tub and almost drowns. She suddenly realizes Rose is in the tub, bathing. She begs Rose's forgiveness for scaring her with the knife, to which Rose replies that it is Lamine causing the visions, as he is jealous of Aisha's attention to Rose.

Aisha finally raises the funds for airfare. Mariatou arrives alone, saying that during the long wait for the airfare, Lamine drowned in the ocean during a beach visit. Malik takes Aisha to stay with him, Bishop and Kathleen. Aisha goes for a walk, a ruse to go and drown herself in the Hudson River. Malik rescues her, and they discover that she is pregnant with their child. They move on with life, including their new baby.

== Cast ==
- Anna Diop as Aisha
- Michelle Monaghan as Amy
- Sinqua Walls as Malik
- Morgan Spector as Adam
- Rose Decker as Rose
- Leslie Uggams as Kathleen
- Zephani Idoko as Sallay

In addition, Olamide Candide-Johnson and Jahleel Kamara make brief appearances as Mariatou and Lamine, respectively.

== Production ==
On April 13, 2021, it was announced that Nikyatu Jusu would make her directorial debut with Nanny, a film that she wrote and is part of the 2020 The Black List of screenplays that would not be released in theaters during that calendar year. In June 2021, Anna Diop, Michelle Monaghan, Sinqua Walls, Morgan Spector, Zephani Idoko and Phylicia Rashad joined the cast of the film. Phylicia Rashad was replaced by Leslie Uggams before production began.

Principal photography began in June 2021 in New York City, with cinematography by Rina Yang.

== Release ==
Nanny had its world premiere at the Sundance Film Festival on January 22, 2022. In March 2022, Amazon Studios and Blumhouse Productions acquired distribution rights to the film in a deal around $7 million, winning them in a competitive situation that also included Sony Pictures Classics and Neon. Jason Blum, who joined the film as an executive producer post-acquisition, remarked: "We're proud to have writer/director Nikyatu Jusu's Nanny as part of our slate for Amazon. It's a gem of a horror film that combines impressive filmmaking and powerful storytelling, and is worthy of the Grand Jury Prize it was awarded at Sundance." The studios plan to release the film both theatrically and on Prime Video. A special presentation of the film was screened at the Toronto International Film Festival in September 2022, followed by one at the 2022 AFI Fest on November 3, 2022. Nanny was given a limited theatrical release on November 23, 2022, by Amazon Studios, prior to streaming on Prime Video starting December 16, 2022.

== Reception ==
The film received positive reviews from critics. On the review aggregator website Rotten Tomatoes, 90% of 143 critics' reviews are positive, with an average rating of 7/10. The website's consensus reads: "Led by Anna Diop's strong central performance, the smartly disquieting Nanny is a promising debut for writer-director Nikyatu Jusu." Metacritic, which uses a weighted average, assigned the film a score of 72 out of 100, based on 30 critics, indicating "generally favorable" reviews.

=== Accolades ===
At the 2022 Sundance Film Festival, Nanny won the Grand Jury Prize in the US Dramatic Competition, which made the film the first horror film, and Jusu the second Black female filmmaker, to ever win the top prize.
