= The Fire Inside (film) =

2024 film by Rachel Morrison

- Theatrical release poster
- Directed by: Rachel Morrison
- Written by: Barry Jenkins
- Produced by: Elishia Holmes; Barry Jenkins
- Starring: Ryan Destiny; Brian Tyree Henry; Adam Clark
- Cinematography: Rina Yang
- Edited by: Harry Yoon
- Music by: Tamar-kali
- Production company: Pastel Productions
- Distributed by: Amazon MGM Studios (Note: Released through the Metro-Goldwyn-Mayer banner.)
- Release dates: September 7, 2024 (TIFF); December 25, 2024 (United States)
- Running time: 109 minutes
- Country: United States
- Language: English
- Budget: $12 million
- Box office: $8.1 million

The Fire Inside is a 2024 American biographical sports drama film directed by Rachel Morrison in her feature directorial debut, written and produced by Barry Jenkins. The film is about the early boxing career of Claressa "T-Rex" Shields, a fighter from Flint, Michigan, including her competing at the 2012 Summer Olympics. Ryan Destiny stars as Shields, alongside Brian Tyree Henry and Adam Clark.

The Fire Inside premiered in the Special Presentations section of the Toronto International Film Festival on September 7, 2024, and was released in the United States by Amazon MGM Studios on December 25, 2024. It received positive reviews and grossed $8.1 million on a $12 million budget.

== Plot ==
Claressa “T‑Rex” Shields, a determined teenager from Flint, Michigan, refuses to be confined by the chaos of her upbringing. When she walks into the boys‑only boxing gym of former pro Jason Crutchfield, she demands a chance to train. Despite the gym’s rough environment and Crutchfield’s reluctance, he eventually accepts her, setting her on an athletic journey that begins as survival and becomes hope.

Under Crutchfield’s mentorship, Claressa develops into a competitor. As she moves through local and national amateur ranks, she confronts personal turmoil—poverty, unreliable family support, and the trauma of her childhood in a declining Flint. Despite these obstacles, she earns a spot on the U.S. Olympic team for the 2012 London Games.

At 17 years old, Shields shocks the boxing world by becoming the first American woman to win Olympic gold in boxing, defeating top international opponents to secure her place in history. But despite her victory, Claressa returns home to financial insecurity, lack of endorsement opportunities, and systemic neglect, especially when male athletes from her Olympic class surge into multimillion‑dollar fame, while she struggles to survive and is even tempted to pawn her medal to support her family.

== Cast ==
- Ryan Destiny as Claressa "T-Rex" Shields
- Brian Tyree Henry as Jason Crutchfield
- Oluniké Adeliyi as Jackie Shields
- De'Adre Aziza as Mickey
- Adam Clark as Clarence

== Production ==
On October 7, 2016, Universal Pictures hired Barry Jenkins to adapt the 2015 documentary T-Rex, about boxer Claressa Shields, for the big screen, with the possibility to direct the new film. On June 19, 2019, Rachel Morrison was set to make her directorial debut on the film, which was to be titled Flint Strong; Jenkins would produce with Michael De Luca and Elishia Holmes, while Zackary Canepari and Drea Cooper, who worked on T-Rex, would serve as executive producers.

On November 13, 2019, Ryan Destiny was cast as Claressa "T-Rex" Shields. On February 5, 2020, Ice Cube was cast as Shields' coach, Jason Crutchfield. Judy Greer was added on May 14 but for unknown reasons did not appear in the film. However, on October 29, 2021, it was reported that Cube had left the project after refusing to get vaccinated for COVID-19 to film Oh Hell No (later titled Stepdude) for Columbia Pictures, putting the film in turnaround.

Principal photography began at Cinespace Film Studios in Toronto on March 11, 2020, but on March 13, production was halted due to the COVID-19 pandemic. In an interview with The Guardian, Shields stated that production on Flint Strong was set to resume in June 2021. However, the project entered another long delay due to being offloaded by Universal. It would be picked up by Metro-Goldwyn-Mayer, and on May 25, 2022, Brian Tyree Henry joined the cast to replace Ice Cube, and Oluniké Adeliyi joined to play Shields' mother, with filming resuming later that month. On July 6, 2022, De'Adre Aziza joined the cast as Mickey, Crutchfield's wife. In July 2022, filming took place in Hamilton, Ontario, where the FirstOntario Centre was used as an Olympic boxing venue. In March 2024, it was announced that the project had been renamed from Flint Strong to The Fire Inside.

=== Music ===
Tamar-kali composed the score for The Fire Inside, which was released on December 25, 2024, through Lakeshore Records, with "Build Up to Olympic Final / Final Round" released one day earlier. Tamar-kali used a combination of "strings, percussion, modern electronic sounds and brass" in scoring the film.

The Fire Inside (Original Motion Picture Score)

Film score by Tamar-kali
- Released: December 25, 2024
- Length: 15:01
- Label: Lakeshore
- Producers: Fritz Myers; Waajeed

Tamar-kali chronology
Shirley (Soundtrack from the Netflix Film) (2024)	The Fire Inside (Original Motion Picture Score) (2024)

Singles from The Fire Inside (Original Motion Picture Score)
- 1. "Build Up to Olympic Final / Final Round" Released: December 24, 2024

All tracks are written by Tamar-kali.

The Fire Inside (Original Motion Picture Score) track listing
No.	Title	Length
1.	"Opening"	1:27
2.	"No Food"	0:57
3.	"Fire Inside"	0:52
4.	"Kicked Out"	0:50
5.	"World Championships"	0:55
6.	"You Made It"	0:58
7.	"Marshall Eliminated"	0:57
8.	"Build Up to Olympic Final / Final Round"	3:45
9.	"Olympic Champion"	1:29
10.	"Ressa & Jason Fight"	1:29
11.	"Get Back Up"	1:17

== Release ==
In July 2024, The Fire Inside was announced as part of the Special Presentations section at the Toronto International Film Festival scheduled for September 7, 2024. The film was theatrically released on December 25, 2024.

== Reception ==
=== Box office ===
In the United States and Canada, The Fire Inside was released alongside Nosferatu, Babygirl, and A Complete Unknown, and was projected to gross around $5 million from 2,006 theaters in its five-day opening weekend. The film made $1.6 million on its first day and went on to debut to $2 million in its opening weekend (and a total of $4.3 million over the five days), finishing in 10th. It made $1.2 million in its second weekend.

=== Critical response ===
On the review aggregator website Rotten Tomatoes, 93% of 103 critics' reviews are positive, with an average rating of 7.4/10. The website's consensus reads: "Equal measures inspiring, and enraging, this typical sports drama knows how to take a hit and dole them out with enough emotion and vigor to stoke The Fire Inside." Metacritic, which uses a weighted average, assigned the film a score of 79 out of 100, based on 24 critics, indicating "generally favorable" reviews. Audiences polled by CinemaScore gave the film an average grade of "A" on an A+ to F scale, while those surveyed by PostTrak gave it a 86% overall positive score, with 62% saying they would "definitely recommend" it.

=== Accolades ===
Award	Ceremony date	Category	Recipient(s)	Result	Ref.
Black Reel Awards	February 10, 2025	Outstanding Lead Performance	Ryan Destiny	Nominated	
Black Reel Awards	February 10, 2025	Outstanding Breakthrough Performance	Ryan Destiny	Nominated	
Black Reel Awards	February 10, 2025	Outstanding Supporting Performance	Brian Tyree Henry	Nominated	
Black Reel Awards	February 10, 2025	Outstanding Screenplay	Barry Jenkins	Nominated	
Black Reel Awards	February 10, 2025	Outstanding Score	Tamar-kali	Nominated	
Camerimage	November 23, 2024	Golden Frog for Best Cinematography	Rina Yang	Nominated	
Celebration of Cinema and Television	December 9, 2024	Rising Star Award – Film	Ryan Destiny	Won	
Denver International Film Festival	November 10, 2024	Rising Star Award	Ryan Destiny	Won	
Gotham Awards	December 2, 2024	Outstanding Supporting Performance	Brian Tyree Henry	Nominated	
Gotham Awards	December 2, 2024	Breakthrough Performer	Ryan Destiny	Nominated	
Indie Spirit Awards	February 22, 2025	Best Lead Performance	Ryan Destiny	Nominated	
Indie Spirit Awards	February 22, 2025	Best Cinematography	Rina Yang	Nominated	
Michigan Movie Critics Guild	December 9, 2024	Award For Film Excellence	Ryan Destiny	Won	
NAACP Image Awards	February 22, 2025	Outstanding Supporting Actor in a Motion Picture	Brian Tyree Henry	Nominated	
NAACP Image Awards	February 22, 2025	Outstanding Breakthrough Performance in a Motion Picture	Ryan Destiny	Nominated	
NAACP Image Awards	February 22, 2025	Outstanding Writing in a Motion Picture	Barry Jenkins	Nominated	
San Diego Film Critics Society	December 6, 2024	Best First Feature - Director	Rachel Morrison	Nominated	

== See also ==
- Boxing at the 2012 Summer Olympics – Women's middleweight
- List of boxing films
