= Zephani Idoko =

Nigerian-American Actress

- Born: Lagos, Nigeria
- Occupation: Actress
- Years active: 2016–present

Zephani Idoko is a Nigerian-American actress best known for her role as Sallay in Blumhouse and Amazon Studios' Nanny, (written and directed by Nikyatu Jusu) which won the top award (The Grand Jury Prize) at Sundance Film Festival. She's also known for her starring role as Abena in Horror film The Unsettling and for playing Stephanie on the Starz show Power book II: Ghost and Ashley on HBO Max's Gossip Girl

== Career ==
Shortly after her graduation and move to New York City, She was cast in the starring role of Abena in the independent psychological horror film The Unsettling which screened at international film festivals in Australia, The UK and The US in 2021 and 2022l before its release on February 10, 2023 in theaters and on Apple TV+, Prime Video and other streaming platforms. Idoko's more recent TV appearances include the recurring role of Stephanie in Starz show Power Book II: Ghost and her role in the 2nd season of HBO Max's Gossip Girl. In late 2025, the UK-set romantic comedy series Twelve Dates 'Til Christmas was released. Idoko plays Sarah in 5 of the 6 episodes in this Limited series starring Mae Whitman.

In June 2021, it was announced that Idoko was cast in the supporting role of Sallay in Blumhouse and Amazon Studios' psychological Horror film, Nanny, Which Premiered at Sundance Film Festival 2022 and won the Grand Jury Prize in the dramatic competition. Idoko has discussed the film and her career in a number of interviews, including her feature in Photobook Magazine. and with OkayAfrica Nanny screened in the Special Presentations category at TIFF in September 2022 and at several other festivals including BFI London Film Festival, AFI FEST and AFRIFF in Lagos Nigeria, where Idoko was born. Nanny was released in movie theaters November 23, 2022, followed by a Prime Video streaming release on December 16, 2022.

== Filmography ==
=== Film ===
Year	Title	Role	Notes
2016	Die Dopelganger	Salon Receptionist	Short Film
2017	Offsprung	Make-up Artist	Short film
2018	Can Collector	Michelle	Short film
2019	A Woman of No Importance	Yosola	Short Film. Formerly titled Ismat. Screened at 2019 Columbia University Film Festival Premiered at Flickerfest 2022. Official selection at Short of the Week in 2022 Released as Vimeo Staff Pick
2021	The Unsettling	Abena	Screened at festivals in Australia, the United Kingdom, NYC and Chattanooga in 2021 and 2022. General release February 10, 2023.
2022	Nanny	Sallay	Winner: Grand Jury Prize at Sundance Film Festival 2022

=== Television ===
Year	Title	Role	Notes
2017	Bad Henry	Caroline Love	Investigation Discovery film
2021	Power Book II: Ghost	Stephanie	2 episodes
2022	Gossip Girl	Ashley	Season 2 episode 6
2025	Twelve Dates 'Til Chrismas	Sarah	5 episodes
