= Meng'er Zhang =

Chinese actress

- 张梦儿
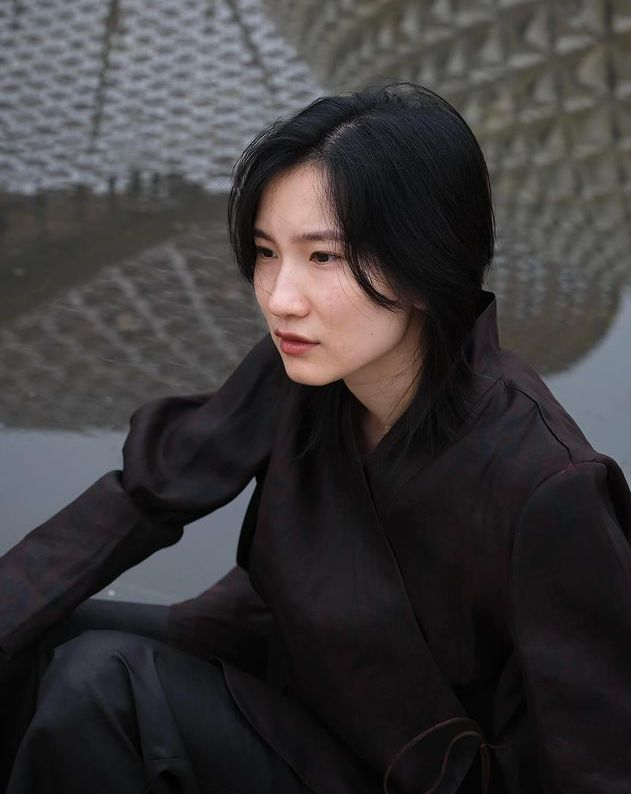
- Zhang in 2023
- Born: Zhang Meng'er; April 22, 1987 (age 39); Nanjing, Jiangsu, China
- Education: East 15 Acting School; Russian Institute of Theatre Arts
- Occupation: Actress
- Spouse: Yung Lee (m. 2021)

Chinese name
- Simplified Chinese: 张梦儿
- Traditional Chinese: 張夢兒
Transcriptions
Standard Mandarin
- Hanyu Pinyin: Zhāng Mèng'er
- IPA: [ʈʂáŋ məŋ.aɚ]

Meng'er Zhang (Chinese: 张梦儿; pinyin: Zhāng Mèng'er; born April 22, 1987) is a Chinese actress. She made her Hollywood debut in 2021, in which she is best known for portraying Xu Xialing in the Marvel Cinematic Universe (MCU) film Shang-Chi and the Legend of the Ten Rings and reprised her voice role in the third and final season of What If...? (2024).

== Early life and education ==
Zhang is the daughter of an actor and a stage designer. She grew up heavily-devoted to theater arts in order to follow in her mother's footsteps. Prior to becoming a professional actress, she starred in stage and musical productions in Nanjing, where she was born and raised, and Shanghai. In 2009, she graduated from Nanjing University of the Arts with a bachelor's degree. She attended the East 15 Acting School in Essex and the Russian Institute of Theater Arts in Moscow.

== Career ==
=== Early career ===
In 2009, Zhang participated in China's Super Girl TV singing contest and was amongst the top 20 participants nationwide before withdrawing as her parents had arranged further schooling overseas for her. She later starred in numerous theatre productions. In 2013, in a Chinese stage adaptation, titled Finding Destiny (寻找初恋), of the Korean musical, Finding Mr. Destiny, Zhang played the female lead Luo Yan. In 2017, she starred in the Chinese musical adaptation of The Street of Dawn (黎明之街) where she played Nakanishi Akiba (仲系 秋叶), and in Oliver Twist where she played Dodger. In 2019, she was in In the Mood for Sorrow (马不停蹄的忧伤) where she was nominated for the Best leading Actress Award at 13th Daegu International Musical Festival.

=== Hollywood ===
Shang-Chi and the Legend of the Ten Rings was her debut mainstream film role. Before being cast, she sent an audition-tape for an unknown role in an unknown film for women who could speak both Mandarin Chinese and English. After being cast for Shang-Chi, she received intense martial arts stunt training. During production of Shang-Chi, she took advice from co-star Ben Kingsley on the distinction between stage- and camera-acting, and director Destin Daniel Cretton also coached her in on-screen acting as she had little experience working with camera framing. Her casting in the film was revealed at the Disney Investor Day 2020 in December of that year. Zhang joined the cast of The Witcher for its third season as a human hunter named Milva.

== Personal life ==
On May 10, 2021, Zhang married Yung Lee, an action designer on Shang-Chi, whom she met on the set of the film. The Shang-Chi cast and crew, including her costars Simu Liu and Awkwafina, hosted a surprise wedding reception for them at Disneyland.

== Filmography ==
Film
Year	Title	Role	Ref
2021	Shang-Chi and the Legend of the Ten Rings	Xu Xialing	

Television
Year	Title	Role	Notes	Ref
2023–2025	The Witcher	Milva	Seasons 3 & 4; Recurring	
2024	What If...?	Xu Xialing (voice)	Episode: "What If... 1872?"	

Theatre
Year	Title	Roles	Notes	Ref
2013	Finding Destiny 《寻找初恋》	Luo Yan 骆颜		
2014	The Miraculous Journey of Edward Tulane			
2016	The Moon and Sixpence			
2017	The Street of Dawn 《黎明之街》	Nakanishi Akiba 仲系 秋叶		
2017	Oliver Twist	Dodger		
2019	In The Mood For Sorrow 《马不停蹄的忧伤》	Lin Baosheng 林宝笙	Nominated for Best Leading Actress Award at 13th Daegu International Musical Festival	
