= Shang-Chi and the Legend of the Ten Rings =

2021 Marvel Studios film

- Theatrical release poster
- Directed by: Destin Daniel Cretton
- Screenplay by: Dave Callaham; Destin Daniel Cretton; Andrew Lanham
- Story by: Dave Callaham; Destin Daniel Cretton
- Based on: Marvel Comics
- Produced by: Kevin Feige; Jonathan Schwartz
- Starring: Simu Liu; Awkwafina; Meng'er Zhang; Fala Chen; Florian Munteanu; Benedict Wong; Yuen Wah; Michelle Yeoh; Ben Kingsley; Tony Leung
- Cinematography: William Pope
- Edited by: Nat Sanders; Elísabet Ronaldsdóttir; Harry Yoon
- Music by: Joel P. West
- Production company: Marvel Studios
- Distributed by: Walt Disney Studios Motion Pictures
- Release dates: August 16, 2021 (Hollywood, Los Angeles); September 3, 2021 (United States)
- Running time: 132 minutes
- Country: United States
- Language: English
- Budget: $150–200 million
- Box office: $432.2 million

Shang-Chi and the Legend of the Ten Rings is a 2021 American superhero film based on Marvel Comics featuring the character Shang-Chi. Produced by Marvel Studios and distributed by Walt Disney Studios Motion Pictures, it is the 25th film in the Marvel Cinematic Universe (MCU). The film was directed by Destin Daniel Cretton from a screenplay he wrote with Dave Callaham and Andrew Lanham, and stars Simu Liu as Shang-Chi alongside Awkwafina, Meng'er Zhang, Fala Chen, Florian Munteanu, Benedict Wong, Yuen Wah, Michelle Yeoh, Ben Kingsley, and Tony Leung. In the film, Shang-Chi is forced to confront his past when his father Wenwu (Leung), the leader of the Ten Rings terrorist organization, draws Shang-Chi and his sister Xialing (Zhang) into a search for a mythical village.

A film based on Shang-Chi entered development in 2001, but work did not begin in earnest until December 2018 when Callaham was hired. Cretton joined in March 2019 and the film's title and primary cast were announced that July. This revealed the film's connection to the Ten Rings organization, which previously appeared throughout the MCU, and its leader Wenwu who was adapted from the problematic comic book characters Fu Manchu and the Mandarin. Shang-Chi and the Legend of the Ten Rings is the first Marvel Studios film with an Asian director and a predominantly Asian cast. Filming began in Sydney in February 2020 but was put on hold in March due to the COVID-19 pandemic. Production resumed in August and ended in October, with additional filming in San Francisco. Brad Allan and other members of the Jackie Chan Stunt Team coordinated the fight sequences.

Shang-Chi and the Legend of the Ten Rings premiered in Hollywood, Los Angeles, on August 16, 2021, and was released in the United States on September 3 as part of Phase Four of the MCU. It grossed over $432 million worldwide, making it the ninth-highest-grossing film of 2021. It set several box office records and received positive reviews from critics, many of whom praised the exploration and representation of Asian culture which differentiated the film from the rest of the MCU, as well as the action sequences and Leung's performance. The film received various accolades, including a nomination for Best Visual Effects at the 94th Academy Awards. A sequel is in development.

== Plot ==
A thousand years ago, Xu Wenwu discovers the mystical ten rings which grant godly powers including immortality. He establishes the Ten Rings organization, conquering kingdoms and toppling governments throughout history. In 1996, Wenwu searches for Ta Lo, a village said to harbor mythical beasts. He travels through a magical forest to the village entrance but is stopped by a guardian, Ying Li. The two soon fall in love, but the Ta Lo villagers reject Wenwu so Li chooses to leave with him. They marry and have two children, Shang-Chi and Xialing. Wenwu abandons his organization and locks away the ten rings.

When Shang-Chi is seven years old, Li is murdered by Wenwu's enemies, the Iron Gang. Wenwu dons the rings once again, massacres the Iron Gang, and resumes leadership of his organization. He makes Shang-Chi undergo brutal training in martial arts but does not allow Xialing to train, prompting her to secretly teach herself. When Shang-Chi is 14, Wenwu sends him to assassinate the Iron Gang's leader. After completing his mission, a traumatized Shang-Chi runs away to San Francisco and adopts the name "Shaun".

In the present day, Shang-Chi works as a parking valet with his best friend Katy. They are attacked on a bus by the Ten Rings organization who steal a pendant that Li gave to Shang-Chi. Shang-Chi travels to Macau to find Xialing, fearing that the Ten Rings will go after her matching pendant. He reveals his past to Katy who insists on helping him. They find Xialing at a secret fight club which she founded after escaping from Wenwu at 16. The Ten Rings attack the fight club and Wenwu arrives to capture Shang-Chi, Katy, Xialing, and her pendant.

At the Ten Rings' compound, Wenwu uses the pendants to reveal a mystical map leading to Ta Lo. Wenwu explains that he has heard Li calling and believes she has been held captive in Ta Lo behind a sealed gate. He plans to destroy the village unless they release her. When his children and Katy object, he imprisons them. They meet former actor Trevor Slattery, whom the Ten Rings imprisoned for impersonating Wenwu, (Note: As depicted in Iron Man 3 (2013) and the Marvel One-Shot short film All Hail the King (2014)) and his hundun companion Morris. They escape and Morris guides them to Ta Lo, which exists in a separate dimension with various Chinese mythological creatures.

The group meet Li's sister Ying Nan who explains the history of Ta Lo: thousands of years ago, the village's universe was attacked by the soul-consuming Dweller-in-Darkness and its soul eaters, but was saved by a Chinese dragon called the Great Protector who helped seal the Dark Gate to the Dweller's world. According to Nan, the Dweller-in-Darkness has been impersonating Li so Wenwu will use the ten rings to open the Gate. Shang-Chi, Xialing, Katy, Slattery, and Morris join the villagers in training and preparing for Wenwu's arrival, using outfits and weapons crafted from dragon scales that are effective against the soul eaters.

Wenwu and the Ten Rings arrive and attack. Wenwu overpowers Shang-Chi, pushes him into the nearby lake, and attacks the Gate with the rings. This allows some of the Dweller's soul eaters to escape, with the Ten Rings allying with the villagers to effectively fight them. The Great Protector revives Shang-Chi and bears him from the lake to battle the soul eaters. Wenwu and Shang-Chi fight once more, and Shang-Chi gains the upper hand but chooses to spare Wenwu. The Dweller-in-Darkness escapes from the weakened Gate and attacks Shang-Chi. Wenwu saves Shang-Chi but is killed by the Dweller-in-Darkness; he bequeaths the rings to Shang-Chi before he dies. Shang-Chi, the Great Protector, Xialing, and Katy slay the Dweller-in-Darkness. Afterward, Shang-Chi and Katy return to San Francisco where the sorcerer Wong summons them to Kamar-Taj.

In a mid-credits scene, Wong introduces Shang-Chi and Katy to Bruce Banner and Carol Danvers and the group discusses the origins of the rings. They discover that the rings are acting as a beacon to something. In a post-credits scene, Xialing becomes the new leader of the Ten Rings, despite telling Shang-Chi that she would disband the organization, and begins training women alongside men.

== Cast ==
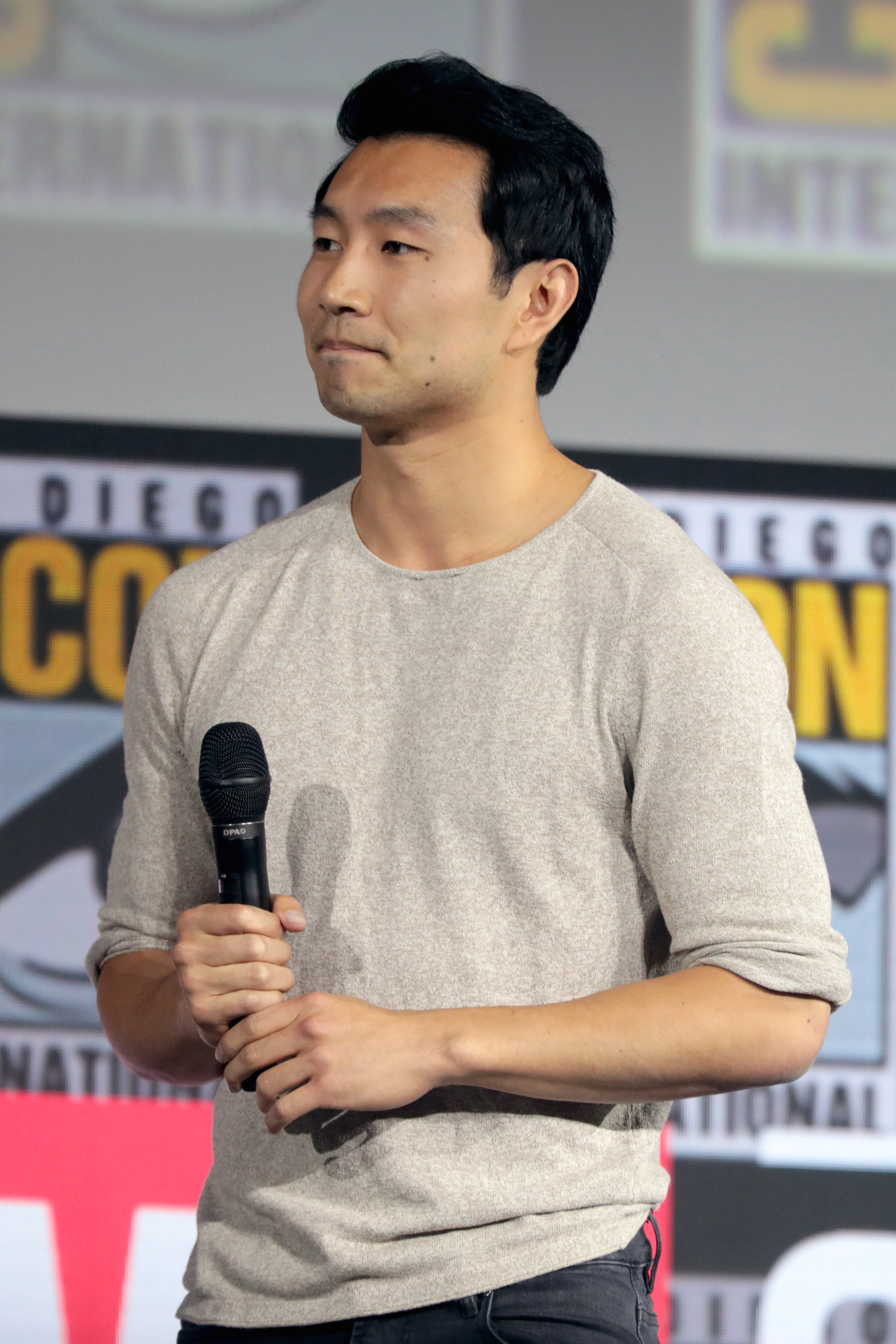
Simu Liu at the 2019 San Diego Comic-Con

- Simu Liu as Xu Shang-Chi / Shaun:
  A skilled martial artist who was trained at a young age to be an assassin by his father Wenwu. Shang-Chi left the Ten Rings organization for a normal life in San Francisco, and changed his name to "Shaun". Director Destin Daniel Cretton characterized Shang-Chi as a fish out of water in the U.S. who attempts to hide that with his charisma, and does not know "who he really is". Cretton also compared Shang-Chi to Matt Damon's character Will Hunting from the film Good Will Hunting (1997), with both characters combining masculinity and vulnerability, and having secrets and superpowers that they do not understand. Cretton said the film was a journey for Shang-Chi to discover his place in the world, and Liu added that Shang-Chi's identity struggles are the core of the character rather than his martial arts skills. Liu performed many of his own stunts since the character does not wear a mask, and put on 10 pounds (4.5 kg) of muscle for the role while working on his flexibility. Liu was knowledgeable in taekwondo, gymnastics, and Wing Chun. Additionally, he trained in other various martial arts, including tai chi, wushu, Muay Thai, silat, Krav Maga, jiu-jitsu, boxing, and street fighting for the film. Jayden Zhang and Arnold Sun portray Shang-Chi as a child and teenager, respectively.
- Awkwafina as Katy:
  A hotel valet and Shang-Chi's best friend in San Francisco who is unaware of his past. Awkwafina described Katy as relatable, with a "real heart" and dedication to Shang-Chi, who is "thrust into a world where she doesn't really know what to do [... and is] discovering things about herself". Katy has difficulty committing to a direction in her life, something Awkwafina felt was a relatable struggle for a lot of Asian Americans due to their own expectations as well as those of their parents and society.
- Meng'er Zhang as Xu Xialing:
  Shang-Chi's estranged younger sister and Wenwu's daughter, who was excluded from the Ten Rings organization by her father due to his traditional gender bias. Xialing is an amalgamation of several comic book characters, particularly inspired by Zheng Bao Yu. This was Zhang's first film role, and she said the character was vulnerable behind her tough exterior. She originally had a red streak in her hair but Zhang asked for this to be removed during filming after discovering the style's association with the "rebellious Asian girl" stereotype; the streak was removed from existing footage in post-production with visual effects. For the role, Zhang trained in MMA, tai chi, and rope dart. Elodie Fong and Harmonie He portray Xialing as a child and teenager, respectively.
- Fala Chen as Ying Li: Wenwu's wife and the mother of Shang-Chi and Xialing who was a guardian of Ta Lo. Chen studied tai chi for the role.
- Florian Munteanu as Razor Fist: A member of the Ten Rings who has a machete blade for his right hand.
- Benedict Wong as Wong: A Master of the Mystic Arts participating in a cage fighting tournament with Emil Blonsky.
- Yuen Wah as Guang Bo: One of the leaders of Ta Lo.
- Michelle Yeoh as Ying Nan: A guardian of Ta Lo who is Shang-Chi and Xialing's aunt.
- Ben Kingsley as Trevor Slattery:
  An actor who previously took on the guise of the Mandarin and was abducted by the Ten Rings, becoming a "court jester" or Shakespearean fool for Wenwu. He has a close relationship with the mythical hundun Morris, and journeys to Ta Lo with Shang-Chi. Cretton felt it was "essential to hear [Slattery] admit how ridiculous that whole [Mandarin impersonation] situation was", as seen in the film Iron Man 3 (2013) and the Marvel One-Shot short film All Hail the King (2014), feeling that having Slattery apologize for impersonating Wenwu was the perfect way to apologize for the racial stereotypes surrounding the Mandarin. Kingsley enjoyed revisiting and developing the character, with Cretton saying Kingsley was able to portray "a Trevor who has actually benefited from being in prison and has come out a clean and sober version of himself".
- Tony Leung as Xu Wenwu:
  Shang-Chi and Xialing's father and the leader of the Ten Rings. Wenwu is an original character created for the Marvel Cinematic Universe (MCU) who replaces Shang-Chi's original comic book father Fu Manchu, a "problematic character" associated with racist stereotypes to whom Marvel Studios does not hold the film rights. In the film, Wenwu has taken on many different names, including "The Mandarin", which is a name that producer Jonathan Schwartz noted comes with audience expectations due to its comic book history. He said Wenwu was a more complex and layered character than the comic book version, with Cretton adding that there were problematic aspects of the Mandarin's comic book portrayal that he wanted to change. He felt Leung avoided Asian stereotypes and a one-dimensional portrayal by bringing humanity and love to the role, describing Wenwu as a "fully realized human" with relatable reasons for his bad decisions. Leung did not want to approach the character as a villain, instead hoping to explore the reasons behind why he is "a man with history, who craves to be loved", describing him as "a sociopath, a narcissist, [and] a bigot". Leung proposed that Wenwu should fight using a combination of different martial arts, rather than "just typical kung fu in the '70s", to reflect his long life and history of fighting, but the idea was rejected by Cretton. This was Leung's first Hollywood film after a long career primarily in Hong Kong action cinema.

Also appearing in the film are Ronny Chieng as Jon Jon, Xialing's right-hand man and announcer at her underground fighting club; Jodi Long as Mrs. Chen, Katy's mother; Dallas Liu as Ruihua, Katy's brother; Paul He as Chancellor Hui; Tsai Chin as Katy's grandmother; Andy Le as Death Dealer, one of Wenwu's assassins who trained Shang-Chi in his youth; Stephanie Hsu and Kunal Dudheker as Soo and John, married friends of Shang-Chi and Katy; Zach Cherry as Klev, a bus rider who livestreams one of Shang-Chi's fights (after portraying a street vendor in 2017's Spider-Man: Homecoming); and Dee Baker as the voice of Morris, a hundun who befriends Slattery. Jade Xu reprises her role as a Black Widow named Helen from Black Widow (2021), while Tim Roth provides uncredited vocals for his The Incredible Hulk (2008) character Abomination. Mark Ruffalo and Brie Larson appear, uncredited, in the mid-credits scene, reprising their respective MCU roles of Bruce Banner and Carol Danvers / Captain Marvel.

== Production ==
=== Development ===
According to Margaret Loesch, former president and CEO of Marvel Productions, Stan Lee discussed a potential film or television series based on the Marvel Comics character Shang-Chi with actor Brandon Lee and his mother Linda Lee during the 1980s, with the intention of having Brandon Lee star as the character. Brandon's father, martial arts legend Bruce Lee, was the visual inspiration for artist Paul Gulacy when drawing Shang-Chi during his tenure on the Master of Kung Fu comic book in the 1970s. In 2001, Stephen Norrington signed on to direct a Shang-Chi film entitled The Hands of Shang-Chi. By 2003, it was in development at DreamWorks Pictures with Yuen Woo-Ping replacing Norrington as director and Bruce C. McKenna writing the screenplay. Ang Lee joined the project as a producer in 2004, but it did not materialize and the rights to the character reverted to Marvel. In September 2005, Marvel chairman and CEO Avi Arad announced Shang-Chi as one of ten properties being developed as films by the newly formed Marvel Studios, after the company received financing to produce the slate with Paramount Pictures as distributor. Marvel thought the character could make a great film, despite being relatively unknown, because he has a "very Disney story" in the comic books.

The Ten Rings organization was introduced in Marvel Studios' first Marvel Cinematic Universe (MCU) film, Iron Man (2008), without its leader the Mandarin. Marvel Studios President Kevin Feige felt they could not do the character justice in the Iron Man films because they focused on Tony Stark / Iron Man, and planned to introduce him in a later film instead. According to Chris Fenton, former president of the Chinese-based film production company DMG Entertainment that was in talks with Marvel Studios to co-produce their films, Marvel offered to create a teaser featuring either Shang-Chi or the Mandarin for the Chinese market that would be featured at the end of The Avengers (2012). DMG balked at the offer since the Mandarin's negative stereotypical portrayal in the comics could potentially prevent the film from being released in China and risk DMG being shut down. The Mandarin would eventually appear in the DMG co-produced film Iron Man 3 (2013) portrayed by Ben Kingsley, but he is revealed to be an actor named Trevor Slattery who was hired to pose as the Mandarin. Feige felt this did not necessarily mean a more faithful version of the character did not exist in the MCU, and this was confirmed in the Marvel One-Shot short film All Hail the King (2014) in which Kingsley reprised his role as Slattery.

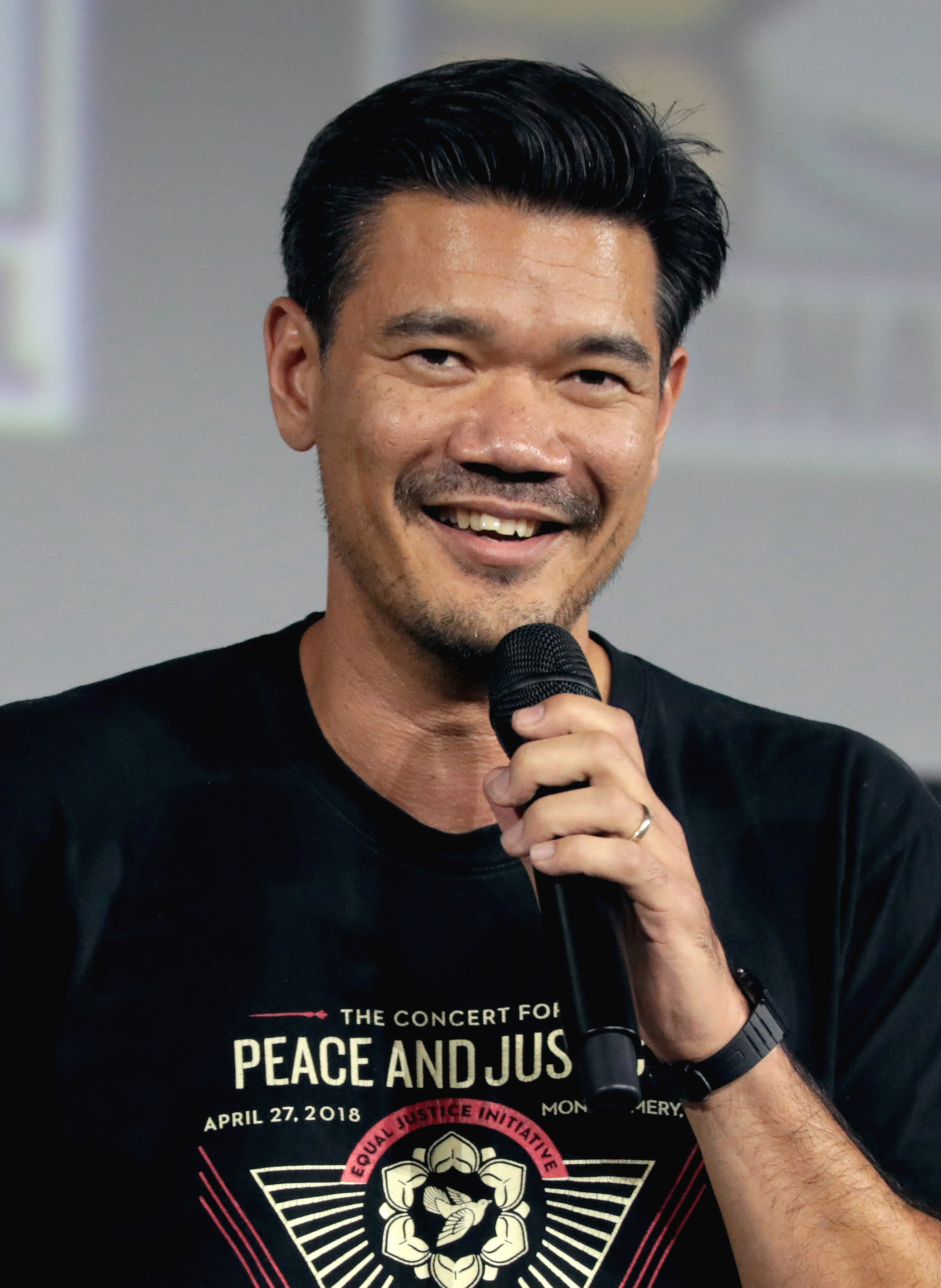
Destin Daniel Cretton promoting the film at the 2019 San Diego Comic-Con

By December 2018, Marvel had fast-tracked development of a Shang-Chi film with the intent of making it their first film with an Asian lead. Marvel hired Chinese-American writer Dave Callaham to write the screenplay, and began looking at Asian and Asian-American filmmakers to potentially direct the film. The studios' goal was to have Asian and Asian-American filmmakers explore themes related to their culture, as they had done for African and African-American culture with the MCU film Black Panther earlier in 2018. Development of the film also came following the success of the film Crazy Rich Asians that was likewise released earlier in 2018 and led to several other Asian-led properties being developed by Hollywood studios. Callaham's script was expected to modernize elements of the comic book story, which was first written in the 1970s, to avoid what modern audiences would consider to be negative stereotypes. When Callaham began work on the script, he became emotional realizing it was the first project where he was asked to write "from my own experience, from my own perspective". Jessica Gao, who would later become the head writer of the Marvel Studios television series She-Hulk: Attorney at Law (2022), also presented a pitch for the film. Richard Newby of The Hollywood Reporter said the film could "break out in a way similar to Black Panther" by bringing a new perspective to the character. Newby felt Shang-Chi could have worked well as a television series, and said it "speaks volumes" that Marvel would decide to make a feature film about the character instead. Newby concluded that the film was an opportunity to avoid stereotypes about Asian martial artists and be "more than Marvel's Bruce Lee".

Marvel Studios hired Japanese-American filmmaker Destin Daniel Cretton to direct the film in March 2019. Deborah Chow—who previously directed episodes of Marvel Television's Netflix series Iron Fist (2017–2018) and Jessica Jones (2015–2019)—Justin Tipping, and Alan Yang were also considered. Cretton had previously not been interested in directing a superhero film, but was drawn to the project to help create a world and character that Asian children could look up to and see themselves in. His pitch included visual inspiration from Chinese, South Korean, Japanese, and other Asian cinema, including anime, to highlight a tone that showed "the drama and the pain of life, but also show[ed] the humor of life". In April, Marvel Studios and Australian Arts Minister Mitch Fifield announced that an upcoming Marvel film, believed to be Shang-Chi, would be filmed at Fox Studios Australia in Sydney and on location throughout the state of New South Wales. The production received AU$24 million (US$18 million) in one-off funding from the Australian government, as well as backing from the AU$10 million (US$8 million) "Made in NSW" state fund. The production was expected to generate AU$150 million (US$113 million) for the Australian economy as well as 4,700 new jobs, while taking advantage of around 1,200 local businesses. Don Harwin, the New South Wales Arts Minister, confirmed in July that this film was Shang-Chi and it would be produced back-to-back with Marvel Studios' Thor: Love and Thunder (2022). Production on Shang-Chi was set to begin in early 2020 and be completed later that year.

=== Pre-production ===
==== Casting ====
Marvel Studios began testing actors in their 20s for the role of Shang-Chi in mid-July 2019, including Lewis Tan and Simu Liu; Tan previously portrayed Zhou Cheng in Iron Fist. The studio was adamant that actors be of Chinese descent to audition for the character. Liu was considered earlier in the audition process and was brought back in for a second audition when the creatives were finding it difficult to cast the role. He tested again on July 14 and was officially cast on July 16. Awkwafina, who was the first actor cast for the film, had chemistry tests with the potential actors and said "it was apparent that [Liu] was Shang-Chi from the jump". Liu and Awkwafina's castings were announced by Cretton and producer Feige at Marvel Studios' San Diego Comic-Con panel on July 20, where the film's full title was announced to be Shang-Chi and the Legend of the Ten Rings. Feige noted the connection between this title and the Ten Rings organization that had appeared throughout the MCU. He said the group's leader, the Mandarin, would be introduced in this film and Tony Leung had been cast in the role. Cretton had wanted to cast Leung but was doubtful he would accept the part. Despite this hesitation, producer Jonathan Schwartz decided to contact Leung and he accepted the role after a meeting with Cretton.

In December, Feige said the film would feature a predominantly Asian cast. A month later, Michelle Yeoh entered talks for a role in the film. This was for a different character than Aleta Ogord, who Yeoh had briefly portrayed in the MCU film Guardians of the Galaxy Vol. 2 (2017). Jessica Henwick, who previously portrayed Colleen Wing in Marvel's Netflix series, was asked to audition for the role of Xialing in the film, but was concurrently offered the role of Bugs in the film The Matrix Resurrections (2021). After being given an ultimatum to select one of the roles by the respective studios, Henwick chose the Resurrections part. This was partially because she hoped to reprise the role of Wing in a future MCU production. Newcomer Meng'er Zhang was eventually cast in the role. Kingsley reprises his role as Slattery in the film. The character's inclusion was planned early on to help fully explore the "context of who the Mandarin is in the MCU". Schwartz called Slattery a "secret weapon" whose introduction part-way through the film moves it in a different direction and provides comic relief.

==== Writing ====
In addition to Callaham, Cretton and Andrew Lanham also contributed to the screenplay for Shang-Chi and the Legend of the Ten Rings from a story by Callaham and Cretton. The film was described as a "sweeping superhero epic that combines emotional family drama with gravity-defying martial arts action". Schwartz said much of Shang-Chi's arc within Marvel Comics is a family drama, and Cretton wanted to focus on that element for the film, exploring Shang-Chi's broken and abusive family background. Liu noted that the comic book backstory for Shang-Chi is not widely known like those for comic book characters such as Batman or Spider-Man, and that gave the film's writers freedom to take more creative liberties with the story. Cretton and Callaham were cognizant of some of the racial stereotypes surrounding the character in the comics, with Liu saying everyone involved was "very sensitive to not have it go into stereotypical territory". Cretton believed the resulting script was a "really beautiful update" to the character from what began in the comics.

Cretton felt the film told an authentic story about Asian identity. Callaham said there is "no single Asian American voice", and he and Cretton contemplated how the film could speak to "the wider Asian diaspora" and would be generally entertaining but also "personal to all these people". Cast members Liu, Leung, and Zhang contributed their own experiences coming from Canada, Hong Kong, and mainland China, respectively, to add to the authenticity of the film. Some aspects that were discussed regarding each scene were whether characters should be speaking in Mandarin Chinese or English and the type of food served in the different households to ensure it felt authentic to whose house it was. The film's opening begins with narration entirely in Mandarin, which Nancy Wang Yuen, writing for io9, said was a striking decision for an MCU film to "begin in a language other than English and continue to do so for an extended period". Regarding the use of Mandarin in the film, Cretton said the choice of which language to use when was "always rooted in just the logic of the characters and who would naturally be speaking what language". Zhang, whose first language is Mandarin, served as a dialect coach for the other actors. Shang-Chi further deals with some of the negative characterization around Asian-Americans and languages by portraying its characters as having varied knowledge of Asian languages, as demonstrated by an exchange with Katy and the character Jon Jon when Jon Jon says he speaks "ABC" (American-born Chinese). Another such moment is when Shang-Chi teaches Katy how to pronounce his name, which serves as a meta moment to also aid the audience on learning the proper pronunciation of "Shang-Chi".

Cretton felt it was important to have "many strong women" around Shang-Chi that were "kicking his butt into gear" in contrast to the relationship between Shang-Chi and his father Wenwu (the film's version of the Mandarin). These supporting characters also have their own narrative arcs. Cretton's three sisters and his wife helped inspire the characters Katy, Xialing, Ying Nan, and Ying Li. Speaking to the relationship between Shang-Chi and Katy, Cretton enjoyed being able to show a strong, "deeply caring" friendship that is rarely seen in superhero films, adding that it would have felt forced to have the two characters end up in a romantic relationship together. Yeoh requested a scene be added between her character Ying Nan and Zhang's Xialing that would empower Xialing to "step out of the shadows for the first time"; this scene became an important part of Xialing's journey in the film and was one of the many scenes that also addressed the sexism presented in the story. Cretton felt seeing Xialing become the new head of the Ten Rings organization in the film's post-credits scene was reflective of her beginning to take control of her life. Various versions of the scene existed throughout the production before it was moved to be after the credits since they thought it was "a juicy idea for where the story might go in the future".

==== Design ====
Sue Chan served as production designer for the film. The first location that she and the crew scouted was San Francisco, where Chan previously lived. She suggested Clement Street, "the old Chinatown of San Francisco", as the characters' home because it does not have the expected Chinatown cliches. The film's San Francisco apartment set was one of Chan's favorites due to its accuracy to real Asian-American houses. Another favorite was a restaurant set where Wenwu kills his enemies, for which Chan took inspiration from Hong Kong gangster films. Cretton wanted Xialing's fight club to be fun and show her character rather than be scary and dangerous. Chan noted that Xialing's office combines imagery of skulls with flowers and bold colors, and the sets incorporate the character's feminist views. The fighting arena is an octagon because the number eight is significant in Asian cultures.

For Ta Lo, Chan researched ancient Chinese culture and designs and took elements from many eras since the village is not from a specific time in Chinese history. These elements includes symbolism, styles, and colors from the Tang and Song dynasties. Key symbols for the village were the five Chinese elements of wood, water, fire, metal, and earth, with metal being replaced with dragon scales for the film. These elements were used as the basis of the village set, along with traditional construction elements such as bamboo (both real and artificial bamboo was used). The village itself was built in an open area by a reservoir outside of Sydney and all of the buildings in the village were planned, built, and dressed as they would be used by the inhabitants. These include a pottery shed, a cooking shed, and a schoolroom, all built around the central temple which is open on all sides and contains the history of Ta Lo. Ta Lo's universe is inhabited by various Chinese mythological creatures, including dragons, fenghuang, shishi, hundun, jiuwei hu, and qilin. Andy Park led Marvel Studios' visual development team for the film, and specifically designed Shang-Chi's hero costume. The costume combines elements of his own style with those from both his parents: the jacket is made from the Ta Lo dragon scales and is a gift from his mother, he receives the ten rings from his father at the end of the film, and he wears his own American shoes. Costume designer Kym Barrett also researched ancient Chinese designs and then adapted these to suit the film's stunt needs.

The Ten Rings logo that was originally designed for the MCU featured a circle of ten interlocked rings with characters from the Mongolian language. The logo's appearance in Iron Man 3 drew ire from the Mongolian government who felt the Mongolian scripts "offensively tied the country's intangible cultural heritage to a terrorist group". The logo was updated for Shang-Chi to use "inoffensive" Chinese characters instead, including synonyms for strength or power written in ancient seal script. Oyungerel Tsedevdamba, Mongolia's former minister of culture, sports and tourism, believed the change was more to appease the Chinese market than the Mongolian government. The actual ten rings are portrayed as bangles worn on the wrist rather than as finger rings like they are in the comics. Schwartz said multiple approaches to the rings were discussed, and the comic-accurate design looked "a little goofy in practice" and was too similar to the Infinity Stones that appear throughout the MCU. The Ten Rings compound goes through four stages in the film that reflect Wenwu's character: it begins as a "cold" fortress that prominently features the Ten Rings logo; the compound then becomes a family home with bright colors, gardens, design elements from the Ta Lo village, and a mosaic of a phoenix replacing the Ten Rings logo; the color was then stripped from the sets to make it a "desolate shell" as Wenwu mourns the death of his wife; and finally elements of Xialing's fight club are introduced in the post-credits scene as she takes over the compound and makes it her own.

=== Filming ===
Principal photography began in February 2020, shooting at Fox Studios Australia in Sydney and on location throughout the state of New South Wales, under the working title Steamboat. William Pope served as cinematographer for the film, shooting on the Arri Alexa LF. Cretton chose Pope because he felt the cinematographer's style could be both naturalistic and heightened, and because of Pope's work on the film The Matrix (1999) which Cretton believed had the right tone for an MCU film focused on Asian and Asian-American characters. Pope already wanted to work with Cretton after being impressed by his film Short Term 12 (2013). Cretton was inspired for his direction by Jackie Chan's filmography, the Ip Man series, Tai Chi Master (1993), and Kung Fu Hustle (2004) among others in the martial arts and kung-fu genres, as well as anime and video games.

On March 12, after studios had started halting production on films due to the COVID-19 pandemic, Cretton decided to have himself tested for coronavirus after working closely with people who had potentially been exposed to it. This was a precaution due to Cretton having a newborn baby, and he self-isolated while awaiting these results; the test later came back negative. While Cretton was self-isolating, Marvel suspended first unit production for the film but intended for other aspects such as second unit to continue as normal. On March 13, the rest of the film's production was paused as Disney halted filming on most of its projects. Before the shut down, Ronny Chieng joined the cast in an undisclosed role. In early April, Disney shifted much of the MCU's Phase Four slate of films due to the pandemic, moving Shang-Chi's release date to May 7, 2021.

Work building sets for the film resumed at the end of July 2020, and by August 2 all cast and crew members had arrived to begin shooting "in the coming days". Any cast and crew returning to Australia had to be quarantined for two weeks upon arrival before returning to work, according to Australia's COVID-19 guidelines. Later in August, Yeoh was confirmed to be appearing in the film. The next month, the film's release date was pushed back to July 9, 2021, after the MCU film Black Widow was shifted to the May 2021 date. In October, filming took place in San Francisco. Due to the pandemic, crew in Australia could not travel to San Francisco for this filming. Shooting locations included the Russian Hill, Noe Valley, and Nob Hill neighborhoods, as well as Fisherman's Wharf and Ghirardelli Square. Filming wrapped on October 24, 2020.

==== Choreography ====
Original plate from filming in Sydney (top) and a completed shot (bottom) from the bus fight sequence

Cretton wanted to use a range of different fighting styles in the film due to Shang-Chi being trained in different types of martial arts. These include the "elegant, almost ethereal wushu style" from the film Crouching Tiger, Hidden Dragon (2000) and the "kinetic" fights of Jackie Chan's films. Supervising stunt coordinator Brad Allan along with other members of the Jackie Chan Stunt Team became responsible for making the different styles feel consistent, as well as containing elements of Hong Kong action cinema. Schwartz said there was a meaning for each fighting style in the film, and they helped to tell the story visually. Shang-Chi and the Legend of the Ten Rings is dedicated to Allan, who died in August 2021.

The bus fight sequence was part of Cretton's initial pitch for the film. He called it a "what-if scenario" that helped explain the kind of fight sequences he enjoyed, "ones where the stakes just keep rising as the fight continues". Once it was decided to include the sequence in the film and planning for it began, Cretton credited Allan for bringing the "Buster Keaton-like physical comedy [to the fight], mixed with setups and payoffs, and stakes rising ... to almost ridiculous levels". The stunt team added a specific reference to Jackie Chan, who is known for this style of fighting, in which Shang-Chi takes off his jacket, spins it around while fighting, and puts it back on. Fight coordinator Andy Cheng said the whole sequence took over a year to plan, going through as many as 20 different iterations, with most of the differences pertaining to the fighting within the bus. He said figuring out how the bus would be sliced in half and choreographing a fight around that was the most difficult part. The stunt team put together 10 to 15 different "stuntviz" edits planning out the sequence.

Two buses were shipped to Sydney for filming the sequence's interior shots. These buses were taken apart and re-assembled on a 15 feet (4.6 m) high gimbal and a 3.3 feet (1.0 m) high gimbal, with the windows and seats removed most of the time for safety. The sequence was partially completed when the production shut down for COVID, requiring those involved to "retune" once production resumed. Filming for the interior shots took around six weeks. The exterior shots were filmed in San Francisco, with a different crew due to the pandemic. The visual effects team planned out the shoot remotely so the unit could get the footage that was needed. Four more buses were used for this portion of the sequence, including one that was filmed crashing down a hill into several cars. The entire sequence was shot in 48 fps to help with tracking and making adjustments, and was then converted back to 24 fps. The shots in slow-motion were shot at 250 fps using a Phantom Camera. The sequence ends at a real intersection in San Francisco that was partially filmed in Sydney and combined with footage from San Francisco by the visual effects team. Cretton said there were some "fudges" in how accurate the sequence was to San Francisco—"you can't go downhill for six minutes straight"—but was mostly based on a real route, suggested by Chan. The bus is meant to be a Muni bus but different branding was used due to that company not wanting to be associated with a crashing bus.

Cretton initially told Leung that he would not need to fight due to Wenwu's use of the ten rings, but the actor did ultimately have several fight sequences and only had two weeks to prepare for them. He said this was not difficult due to his experience acting in action films. The character's first action scene, where he falls in love with Ying Li, took specific inspiration from the wuxia-style of films such as Hero (2002) which Leung starred in, and he said filming the scene reminded him of his early career. The fight in Macau on scaffolding outside Xialing's fightclub was filmed against bluescreen on several sets of scaffolding, including one that was built on a 45-degree gimbal to achieve a specific shot with Xialing. The Kamehameha attack from the anime series Dragon Ball Z was an inspiration for the final fight between Shang-Chi and Wenwu, which Cretton also included in his pitch.

=== Post-production ===
Nat Sanders and Elísabet Ronaldsdóttir served as co-editors on the film, alongside Harry Yoon. In December 2020, Marvel revealed roles for several cast members, including Awkwafina as Shang-Chi's friend Katy, Yeoh as Jiang Nan, and Chieng as Jon Jon. They also announced the casting of Zhang as Xialing, Fala Chen as Jiang Li, and Florian Munteanu as Razor Fist; Munteanu was cast after Marvel Studios was impressed with his role in the film Creed II (2018). In March 2021, the film's release date was pushed back once again to September 3, 2021, when Black Widow was shifted to the July 2021 date, and Dallas Liu was revealed to be appearing.

The film's official trailer in June 2021 revealed that Benedict Wong would reprise his MCU role of Wong, and the character Emil Blonsky / Abomination would be appearing alongside him; the Abomination first appeared in the MCU in the film The Incredible Hulk (2008), portrayed by Tim Roth, and Roth returned to provide uncredited vocals for the character in Shang-Chi. Feige enjoyed returning to the Abomination after over a decade since his last MCU appearance, especially with the fans recognizing and embracing the reference in the trailer. The characters were added to the film after Gao created a storyline for them in She-Hulk: Attorney at Law, so the audience could be reminded of Abomination and get excited for their upcoming appearances in the series. Wong was thrilled to be part of the film and its Asian cast, expressing excitement to be "sat at a table of Asian excellence".

The film's mid-credits scene, which features Mark Ruffalo as Bruce Banner and Brie Larson as Carol Danvers, was conceived late in production by Cretton to tease the origins of the ten rings. Several origins were written for the rings, but Callaham said none of these made a difference to the film's story so they decided to leave the origin ambiguous which meant it could be addressed in a later MCU project. Cretton hoped they could feature Wong in the scene and have him go to karaoke with Shang-Chi and Katy to sing "Hotel California", but was unsure which additional Avengers characters would appear until late in post-production. Banner and Danvers were chosen since they each represent the science and space aspects of the MCU, respectively, and because their appearances align with other events in the MCU happening around the time of the scene. Cretton also jokingly acknowledged that Larson's appearance continued her streak of appearing in his films after the pair worked together on Short Term 12, The Glass Castle (2017), and Just Mercy (2019). Ruffalo and Larson filmed their roles in early 2021 during the film's additional photography. Feige said the scene indicated how important Shang-Chi is to the MCU, likening it to Nick Fury's appearance in the post-credits scene of Iron Man.

==== Visual effects ====
Christopher Townsend was hired to be the visual effects supervisor for the film. He worked with eleven different vendors, and also hired the Australia-based Joe Farrell to serve as an additional supervisor working with another five vendors. They created more than 1,700 visual effects shots for the film. Farrell supervised the bus sequence in Sydney (and remotely for the San Francisco portion of shooting) and said it was one of the most complicated sequences he and Townsend had worked on. The scene featured 168 shots, with 40 to 50 of them being mostly digital. The environment required digital pieces for the bus, buildings, and people. Farrell said the sequence's motion made editing difficult, especially in regards to the nine passengers. They were mapped out to know where they were at all times and sometimes were digitally moved around. Because the Macau fight takes place on scaffolding outside a glass building, Rodeo FX had to rotoscope around the actors and replace the entire background. A digital version of downtown Macau was created based on reference filming that Farrell again supervised remotely.

External videos
- Marvel Studios' Shang-Chi and The Legend of The Ten Rings End Credits Main On End Title Sequence presents the film's main-on-end title sequence, YouTube video from Perception's channel

The map to Ta Lo went through many iterations to determine how that information should be conveyed. Cretton felt the completed scene, which uses water effects, connected well to the story and was "visually beautiful". The film's main-on-end title sequence, designed by Perception, also focuses on the movement of water. Rising Sun Pictures contributed more than 300 visual effects shots to the film and was primarily responsible for creating Ta Lo. They based the geography of the forest on different locations in Southeast Asia, and integrated this digital environment with some practical elements from material shot in Sydney. The team also worked with the Australian Institute for Machine Learning to develop an advanced technique for facial replacement, powered by artificial intelligence, which was used to replace the stunt double's faces with those of the principal actors for the action scenes. The hundun Morris was inspired by Cretton's family dog, a 15-year-old dachshund. Images of hunduns, which do not have faces, were included during early development as potential inspiration for the film and Cretton wanted to feature one in the film in some way after seeing them. Morris was a green screen "blob" during filming, with Cretton crediting Kingsley for helping to "breathe life into him", making it feel as if Morris was a real character. Multiple different designs were tested for the character, including one that had him looking "like a plucked chicken", but the creatives wanted to ensure Morris remained cute, which was challenging since a character's eyes and face help convey their emotion. As such, they relied on the look of his fur and feathers.

Wētā FX contributed more than 305 visual effects shots to the film, including creating the ten rings. Wētā visual effects supervisor Sean Walker said creating realistic-looking rings digitally was not complicated, but getting the correct movements for each character was; Shang-Chi uses the rings defensively while Wenwu uses them in an aggressive manner. Feige initially wanted the energy of each ring to have its own color as a reference to the comic book rings, which each have a different ability, but they found this to be too distracting. Instead, the energy of the rings is based on who is using them, with warmer orange energy for Shang-Chi and a cooler blue color for Wenwu. Wētā also created the Great Protector and the Dweller-in-Darkness for the final action sequence. The Great Protector's scales were initially based on quartz, porcelain, and shells before the team found images of albino lizards, alligators, and snakes that they thought were the perfect reference for the creature. The dragon's hair was then simulated on top. In contrast, the Dweller-in-Darkness was based on rhino and elephant hides and armored lizards. The souls that the Dweller-in-Darkness and its soul eaters consume were intended to be colorful visualizations of chakras but this was ultimately toned down to a more subtle effect.

== Music ==
Joel P. West, who scored Cretton's four previous films, returned to compose the score for Shang-Chi; he acknowledged that this was the biggest film he had ever worked on. West began working on the film when Cretton was hired and developed his ideas throughout the filmmaking process. He wrote "ominous" and "dominating" music for Wenwu and more "ethereal" music for Ying Li, and then combined these to create Shang-Chi's music since the story is about him accepting both sides of his family. West spent months researching Chinese music so he could incorporate traditional Chinese elements into the score, primarily for Ying Li and Ta Lo. Recording took place with a 70-piece London orchestra at Abbey Road Studios in London by June 2021, with the UK Chinese Ensemble also providing traditional Chinese instruments and performances for the score.

An album featuring the film's score was released digitally by Marvel Music and Hollywood Records on September 1, 2021. Marvel Music, Hollywood Records, and Interscope Records also released four separate singles inspired by the film ahead of its release: "Lazy Susan" by 21 Savage and Rich Brian, "Every Summertime" by Niki, "Run It" by DJ Snake, Rick Ross, and Rich Brian, and "In the Dark" by Swae Lee & Jhené Aiko. A soundtrack album was released on September 3 containing these in addition to songs by JJ Lin, Saweetie, Anderson .Paak, and other members of the "next generation of Asian artists". This was produced by Sean Miyashiro and 88rising, who worked with Cretton to tell a story in the album about the Asian-American experience with particular inspiration from San Francisco because that city is featured in the film.

== Marketing ==
On April 19, 2021, which was Liu's birthday, he shared the first teaser poster for the film. This was shortly followed by Marvel releasing the first teaser trailer. Adam B. Vary of Variety felt it was "gratifying to finally see Liu in action as Shang-Chi" and highlighted how the teaser provided further insight into details such as how the film would depict the Mandarin wearing the ten rings. Cole Delbyck at HuffPost said the "eye-popping" action was unlike anything seen in past MCU films. Writing for io9, Rob Bricken felt the teaser did not disappoint with its action, but the family drama was what made the film look compelling to him. Collider's Adam Chitwood called the teaser "pretty fantastic", comparing its story and tone to Black Panther and saying Shang-Chi looked to be "an exciting, fresh, and new Marvel Cinematic Universe experience" based on the teaser. Reactions to the poster and trailer in Chinese speaking regions in East Asia were more critical, with commentators believing both presented a stereotypical view of Chinese people and culture.

The film's first full trailer was released on June 24, 2021, during ESPN's NBA Countdown. Sean Keane at CNET enjoyed seeing more of Leung in the trailer and called the fight sequences "super-impressive". He was surprised by the inclusion of Abomination at the end of the trailer and noted that the character looked more like his design from the comics than when he appeared in The Incredible Hulk. Digital Spy's Gabriella Geisinger felt the Abomination's role in the film would just be a cameo appearance to set up the character's story in She-Hulk: Attorney at Law but also felt it could have "wide-reaching implications" for the MCU. Germain Lussier of io9, Susana Polo of Polygon, and Jennifer Ouellette of Ars Technica all felt the trailer was a better showcase for Shang-Chi than the teaser was, with Ouellette highlighting the different narration for the trailer that expanded on Shang-Chi's family background. Lussier also noted a lot of new visual effects in the trailer that were not in the teaser, and felt Shang-Chi would soon become a big star despite not being a well-known character.

On August 15, 2021, Ron Han created a GoFundMe drive to raise money for Asian American Pacific Islander (API) children at the Boys & Girls Club in San Gabriel Valley to see Shang-Chi, as well as a larger "Shang-Chi challenge" for other people to create similar drives for their communities; the challenge was inspired by a similar one created for Black Panther. By the end of the month, API nonprofit organization Gold House partnered with GoFundMe to create the Shang-Chi and the Legend of the Ten Rings Gold Open Community Fund to raise money for private screenings of the film for the API community and non-profit groups. An episode of the series Marvel Studios: Legends was released on September 1, exploring the Ten Rings organization using footage from its previous MCU appearances. Beginning September 3, Shang-Chi and Death Dealer began appearing in Disneyland's Avengers Campus. Promotional partners for the film included Sanzo beverages, which released a limited-edition version of lychee flavor; Microsoft; BMW, which acted as the film's global car sponsor and had the BMW iX3 and BMW M8 appear in the film; Old Spice; and international sponsors including Visa, Virgin Plus, Gruppo TIM, Mikron Group, and BGF.

== Release ==
=== Theatrical ===
Shang-Chi and the Legend of the Ten Rings had its world premiere at the El Capitan Theatre and TCL Chinese Theatre in Hollywood, Los Angeles, on August 16, 2021, and was screened at CinemaCon on August 25. The film was released in international markets beginning on September 1, and had been released in 66% of its markets by the end of its first weekend. The film was released in the United States on September 3, in over 4,200 theaters, of which 400 were IMAX, over 850 were premium large format, 1,500 were 3D, and an additional 275 were the D-Box, 4DX, and ScreenX formats. Shang-Chi and the Legend of the Ten Rings is part of Phase Four of the MCU.

Shang-Chi was previously scheduled to be released on February 12, 2021, the first day of the Chinese New Year, before it was shifted to May 7, and then to July 9, delayed due to the COVID-19 pandemic. The film shifted once again in March 2021 to the September 2021 date after Black Widow was moved to the July 9 release date. In Australia, Shang-Chi was released on September 2, with a planned release in New South Wales, Victoria, and Australian Capital Territory on September 16 because of COVID-19-related state lockdowns; it was ultimately released in New South Wales on October 11 when theaters in the state reopened.

The film had a 45-day exclusive theatrical release, rather than being released simultaneously in theaters and on Disney+ with Premier Access like Black Widow was. In August 2021, with the increase of COVID-19 Delta variant cases, Disney CEO Bob Chapek explained that the film would stay theatrical-only for its 45-day window due to logisitical reasons and said this window was an interesting experiment for the company to learn more on how consumers wished to view their films; Liu took issue with Chapek calling the film an experiment, but Feige later stated that Liu's response appeared to be based on a misunderstanding of Chapek's intention.

In May 2021, a Chinese state media report excluded Shang-Chi, as well as Marvel's Eternals, from its list of upcoming MCU films being released. Variety noted that this added to rumors that the films would not be released in China. In September 2021, Deadline Hollywood reported that a theatrical release in China was unlikely due to comments Liu made in an interview with the CBC in 2017 which referenced his parents' negative experiences living in China. Disney still listed the film's release in China as "to be determined" in October, but it ultimately did not receive a theatrical release in the country.

=== Home media ===
The film was released on digital download on November 12, 2021, as well as on Disney+ as part of the service's "Disney+ Day" celebration. Disney+ also received the IMAX Enhanced version of the film. It was released on Ultra HD Blu-ray, Blu-ray, and DVD on November 30. The home media of the film includes audio commentary, deleted scenes, a gag reel, and various behind-the-scenes featurettes.

Following the release of Shang-Chi on Disney+, viewer tracking application Samba TV reported that over 1.7 million U.S. households watched the film within its first weekend of availability. Samba TV also reported viewership numbers for the United Kingdom (250,000), Germany (85,000), and Australia (17,000), while TV Time reported that it was the most-streamed film in the United States during that same time frame. Nielsen stated that it was the second-most-streamed film, behind Netflix's Red Notice, with a viewership of 1.072 billion minutes in its first week. Asian Americans made up 10% of the audience, the highest percentage for any title on the chart. The film remained in the top five on Nielsen and TV Time's charts in the following weeks, and TV Time stated that it was the sixth most-streamed-film globally in 2021. The film was number one on the NPD Videoscan First Alert chart, which tracks combined sales of DVDs and Blu-rays, and the dedicated Blu-ray sales chart for two weeks. It was the third most-selling title on disc for December 2021 according to the NPD Group.

== Reception ==
=== Box office ===
Shang-Chi and the Legend of the Ten Rings grossed $224.5 million in the United States and Canada, and $207.7 million in other territories, for a worldwide total of $432.2 million. It became the highest-grossing film ever released on Labor Day weekend, and earned $13.2 million worldwide from IMAX, another Labor Day weekend record.

Shang-Chi earned $29.6 million on its opening day (which included $8.8 million from its Thursday night previews), the third-best opening day since the start of the COVID-19 pandemic in March 2020. The Thursday night previews gross was the second-highest of the pandemic, behind Black Widow ($13.2 million). It grossed $75.5 million over its three-day opening weekend, the second-largest of the pandemic behind Black Widow ($80.3 million). IMAX contributed $8 million, which was a record for a Labor Day weekend release. The film earned $94.67 million over the four-day Labor Day weekend, surpassing Halloween's (2007) $30.6 million to become the largest Labor Day weekend opening ever. The film surpassed $100 million in five days, the fastest film to reach that milestone since Star Wars: The Rise of Skywalker (2019) did it in its opening weekend. Shang-Chi remained the number one film in its second weekend, earning $35.8 million which was the largest second weekend gross of the pandemic, and in its third weekend when it earned $21.7 million, the second-largest third weekend gross for a September release behind It (2017). It was the third MCU film following Guardians of the Galaxy (2014) and Black Panther to remain the top film for four consecutive weeks, and was the first film of the pandemic era to surpassed $200 million in the United States and Canada when it did so on September 30. It was the third-highest-grossing film in its fifth weekend, the fourth-highest in its sixth weekend, and remained in the top ten at the box office for two additional weekends. The film ended its run at the United States and Canada box office as the second highest-grossing film of 2021 behind Spider-Man: No Way Home.

The film earned $56.2 million from 41 markets in its opening weekend, opening number one in many. The United Kingdom release had the largest opening day of the pandemic, and the largest three-day opening weekend of the pandemic with $7.7 million. In Hong Kong, the film produced the largest September opening weekend, as well as the second-best opening during the pandemic. Nancy Tartaglione of Deadline Hollywood noted South Korea's $6.5 million opening was an underperformance for the market and an MCU film, though it was the first Hollywood film to open at number one there in several weeks. In its second weekend, the film earned $35.2 million from 42 markets, remaining number one in several. In its third weekend, the film earned an additional $20.3 million from 43 markets and was still the top film in territories such as Australia, Brazil, Mexico, and the UK. The film remained at number one in all of the territories in its fourth weekend, when it opened in Indonesia. It was number one there as well with $1.2 million. Shang-Chi was the top film in Australia for nine weekends, with its highest-grossing day coming on October 31, 2021. As of October 2021, the film's largest markets are the United Kingdom ($27.1 million), South Korea ($14.9 million), and France ($11.5 million).

=== Critical response ===
The review aggregator website Rotten Tomatoes reported an approval rating of 92%, with an average score of 7.5/10, based on 344 reviews. The website's critical consensus reads, "Shang-Chi and the Legend of the Ten Rings isn't entirely free of Marvel's familiar formula, but this exciting origin story expands the MCU in more ways than one." On Metacritic, the film has a weighted average score of 71 out of 100, based on 52 critics, indicating "generally favorable" reviews. Critics commonly praised the film's representation of Asian culture which differentiated it from other MCU films, as well as the performances and action sequences. Audiences polled by CinemaScore gave the film an average grade of "A" on an A+ to F scale, while PostTrak reported 91% of audience members gave it a positive score and 78% said they would definitely recommend it.

Peter Debruge at Variety said the decision to give the "second-tier" Shang-Chi the same "over-the-top treatment" as major Marvel heroes had broadened Marvel Studios' cultural representation and would empower audiences of Asian descent in a similar way to what Black Panther did for audiences of African descent. Angie Han of The Hollywood Reporter felt the film did not combine its martial-arts, fantasy elements, and exploration of Chinese and Asian-American culture "as smoothly as [it] should", but did find it to be a fresh and fun superhero film. Giving the film 3.5 out of 4 stars, RogerEbert.com's Nick Allen said the film fit within Marvel's formula but had a soulfulness that other MCU films, as well as superhero and action films in general, did not have. He concluded that Shang-Chi was not an experiment for Marvel and Disney but rather "a promising template for how they can get it right again". Writing for Empire, Laura Sirikul said the film was "a winning blend" of Chinese culture and the Marvel formula that avoided Asian stereotypes and called out some of Marvel's past "racial errors". Francesca Rivera at IGN felt the film had successfully balanced the "real-life complicated conflict between first-gen Asian American children and the wishes of their immigrant parents" with the needs of an MCU film.

Alexis Nedd said Liu was "flawless" as Shang-Chi and compared his casting to that of Robert Downey Jr. as Tony Stark / Iron Man and Chris Evans as Steve Rogers / Captain America in the MCU. Jake Cole of Slant Magazine was more critical, giving the film 1.5 out of 4 stars and criticizing Liu's performance as being "curiously affectless". Cole also criticized the film's flashbacks which he felt slowed the overall story down, but praised Leung as "effortlessly convey[ing] the calm malice with which Wenwu asserts his absolute power as well as the anguish that the man feels over the loss of his wife". Allen said Leung was the film's most brilliant casting, and Han praised his performance for bringing sincerity to Wenwu which made him a "supervillain with a soul". Katie Rife at The A.V. Club said Leung "exudes the type of movie-star charisma critics sometimes complain is on the decline". Rife felt Leung was not being challenged by the material in the film but was still able to bring emotional depth to Wenwu. Sirikul praised the performances of Liu, Awkwafina, and Leung, but felt some of the character arcs were undermined by the film's convoluted story and rushed ending. Entertainment Weekly's Leah Greenblatt highlighted Zhang, who she felt deserved her own spin-off, and Awkwafina.

Rivera praised the film's action sequences as the best of the MCU so far, focusing on the choreography and cinematography and particularly highlighting the wuxia-style fight between Wenwu and Li at the start of the film, but criticized the digital backgrounds in Ta Lo. Wenlei Ma at News.com.au also said the film's action had some of the best choreography of the MCU. Greenblatt praised the bus fight, fight club, and skyscraper fight sequences as "astonishing set pieces", while Matt Goldberg at Collider also praised the action set pieces for combining classic kung-fu movie influences with MCU visual effects. Peter Hartlaub of the San Francisco Chronicle said the bus fight was "one of the best car chases in San Francisco movie history". Allen enjoyed the various fight sequences, saying Cretton changed the height, light, reflections, and staging for each. He described the film's final act as "such an over-the-top, giddy, rollercoaster ride that you can't help but root for it". In contrast, Cole took issue with the amount of visual effects in the action sequences and said the final act "devolves into loud and chaotic visual nonsense". At /Film, Hoai-Tran Bui also criticized the visual effects-heavy third act but said the film had "one of the more forgivable ones, if only because it verges on full fantasia", and praised the wuxia moments.

=== Accolades ===
In December 2021, Shang-Chi and the Legend of the Ten Rings received the Vanguard Award at Unforgettable Gala's 19th Annual Asian American Awards, an honor previously held by The Farewell (2019).

Award	Date of ceremony	Category	Recipient(s)	Result	Ref(s)
Hollywood Music in Media Awards	November 17, 2021	Score – SciFi/Fantasy Film	Joel P. West	Nominated	
People's Choice Awards	December 7, 2021	Movie of 2021	Shang-Chi and the Legend of the Ten Rings	Nominated	
People's Choice Awards	December 7, 2021	Action Movie of 2021	Shang-Chi and the Legend of the Ten Rings	Won	
People's Choice Awards	December 7, 2021	Action Movie Star of 2021	Simu Liu	Won	
People's Choice Awards	December 7, 2021	Male Movie Star of 2021	Simu Liu	Nominated	
People's Choice Awards	December 7, 2021	Female Movie Star of 2021	Awkwafina	Nominated	
St. Louis Film Critics Association	December 19, 2021	Best Action Film	Shang-Chi and the Legend of the Ten Rings	Won	
Florida Film Critics Circle	December 22, 2021	Best Visual Effects	Shang-Chi and the Legend of the Ten Rings	Nominated	
San Diego Film Critics Society	January 10, 2022	Best Visual Effects	Shang-Chi and the Legend of the Ten Rings	Nominated	
Austin Film Critics Association	January 11, 2022	Best Stunts	Shang-Chi and the Legend of the Ten Rings	Nominated	
Seattle Film Critics Society	January 17, 2022	Best Action Choreography	Shang-Chi and the Legend of the Ten Rings	Nominated	
Seattle Film Critics Society	January 17, 2022	Best Visual Effects	Christopher Townsend, Joe Farrell, Sean Walker, Dan Oliver	Nominated	
Seattle Film Critics Society	January 17, 2022	Villain of the Year	Tony Leung	Nominated	
Houston Film Critics Society	January 19, 2022	Best Stunt Coordination	Shang-Chi and the Legend of the Ten Rings	Nominated	
Houston Film Critics Society	January 19, 2022	Best Visual Effects	Shang-Chi and the Legend of the Ten Rings	Nominated	
Screen Actors Guild Awards	February 27, 2022	Outstanding Performance by a Stunt Ensemble in a Motion Picture	Shang-Chi and the Legend of the Ten Rings	Nominated	
Hollywood Critics Association Film Awards	February 28, 2022	Best Visual Effects	Christopher Townsend, Dan Oliver, Joe Farrell, and Sean Walker	Nominated	
Hollywood Critics Association Film Awards	February 28, 2022	Best Action Film	Shang-Chi and the Legend of the Ten Rings	Nominated	
Hollywood Critics Association Film Awards	February 28, 2022	Best Stunts	Shang-Chi and the Legend of the Ten Rings	Won	
Hollywood Critics Association Film Awards	February 28, 2022	Game Changer Award	Simu Liu	Won	
Visual Effects Society	March 8, 2022	Outstanding Visual Effects in a Photoreal Feature	Christopher Townsend, Damien Carr, Joe Farrell, Sean Walker, Dan Oliver	Nominated	
Visual Effects Society	March 8, 2022	Outstanding Virtual Cinematography in a CG Project	Sebastian Trujillo, Louis-Daniel Poulin, Nathan Abbot, Shannon Justison	Nominated	
Visual Effects Society	March 8, 2022	Outstanding Effects Simulations in a Photoreal Feature	"Water, Bubbles & Magic" – Simone Riginelli, Claude Schitter, Teck Chee Koi, Arthur Graff	Nominated	
Visual Effects Society	March 8, 2022	Outstanding Compositing & Lighting in a Feature	"Macau City" – Jeremie Maheu, Mathieu Dupuis, Karthic Ramesh, Jiri Kilevnik	Nominated	
Costume Designers Guild Awards	March 9, 2022	Excellence in Sci-Fi/Fantasy Film	Kym Barrett	Nominated	
Annie Awards	March 12, 2022	Best Character Animation – Live Action	Karl Rapley, Sebastian Trujillo, Richard John Moore, Merlin Bela, Wassilij Maertz, and Pascal Raimbault	Won	
Critics' Choice Movie Awards	March 13, 2022	Best Visual Effects	Shang-Chi and the Legend of the Ten Rings	Nominated	
Critics' Choice Super Awards	March 17, 2022	Best Superhero Movie	Shang-Chi and the Legend of the Ten Rings	Nominated	
Critics' Choice Super Awards	March 17, 2022	Best Actor in a Superhero Movie	Tony Leung	Nominated	
Critics' Choice Super Awards	March 17, 2022	Best Actor in a Superhero Movie	Simu Liu	Nominated	
Critics' Choice Super Awards	March 17, 2022	Best Actress in a Superhero Movie	Michelle Yeoh	Nominated	
Critics' Choice Super Awards	March 17, 2022	Best Villain in a Movie	Tony Leung	Nominated	
Academy Awards	March 27, 2022	Best Visual Effects	Christopher Townsend, Joe Farrell, Sean Noel Walker, and Dan Oliver	Nominated	
Satellite Awards	April 2, 2022	Best Visual Effects	Joe Farrell, Dan Oliver, Christopher Townsend, and Sean Walker	Nominated	
MTV Movie & TV Awards	June 5, 2022	Best Movie	Shang-Chi and the Legend of the Ten Rings	Nominated	
MTV Movie & TV Awards	June 5, 2022	Best Hero	Simu Liu	Nominated	
MTV Movie & TV Awards	June 5, 2022	Best Fight	Shang-Chi vs. Razor Fist	Nominated	
Hugo Awards	September 4, 2022	Best Dramatic Presentation, Long Form	Dave Callaham, Destin Daniel Cretton, and Andrew Lanham	Nominated	
Saturn Awards	October 25, 2022	Best Superhero Film	Shang-Chi and the Legend of the Ten Rings	Nominated	
Saturn Awards	October 25, 2022	Best Actor in a Film	Simu Liu	Nominated	
Saturn Awards	October 25, 2022	Best Supporting Actress in a Film	Awkwafina	Won	
Saturn Awards	October 25, 2022	Best Film Music	Joel P. West	Nominated	
Saturn Awards	October 25, 2022	Best Film Production Designer	Sue Chan	Nominated	
Saturn Awards	October 25, 2022	Best Film Costume	Kym Barrett	Nominated	
Saturn Awards	October 25, 2022	Best Film Visual / Special Effects	Christopher Townsend, Joe Farrell, Sean Noel Walker, and Dan Oliver	Nominated	

== Documentary special ==
In February 2021, the documentary series Marvel Studios: Assembled was announced. The specials go behind the scenes of the MCU films and television series with cast members and additional creatives. A special for this film, "The Making of Shang-Chi and the Legend of the Ten Rings", goes behind the scenes of the making of the film and was released on Disney+ on November 12, 2021.

== Sequel ==
By December 2021, development on a sequel had begun with Cretton returning to write and direct. Liu was also expected to return as Shang-Chi by the following month. He wanted the sequel to explore what his character would do with the "newfound power" of the ten rings, as well as how he fits into the larger MCU. Liu said in July 2023 that he was unsure when the film would be made. By that November, Cretton stepped down as director of the planned film Avengers: The Kang Dynasty, which was eventually reworked into Avengers: Doomsday (2026), to focus on his commitments to other MCU projects, including the Shang-Chi sequel. In September 2024, Cretton signed on to direct Spider-Man: Brand New Day (2026), which was a higher priority for Marvel Studios than the Shang-Chi sequel. In January 2026, Liu reiterated that the sequel was still in development.
