= Annetta Marion =

American television and film director, producer and showrunner

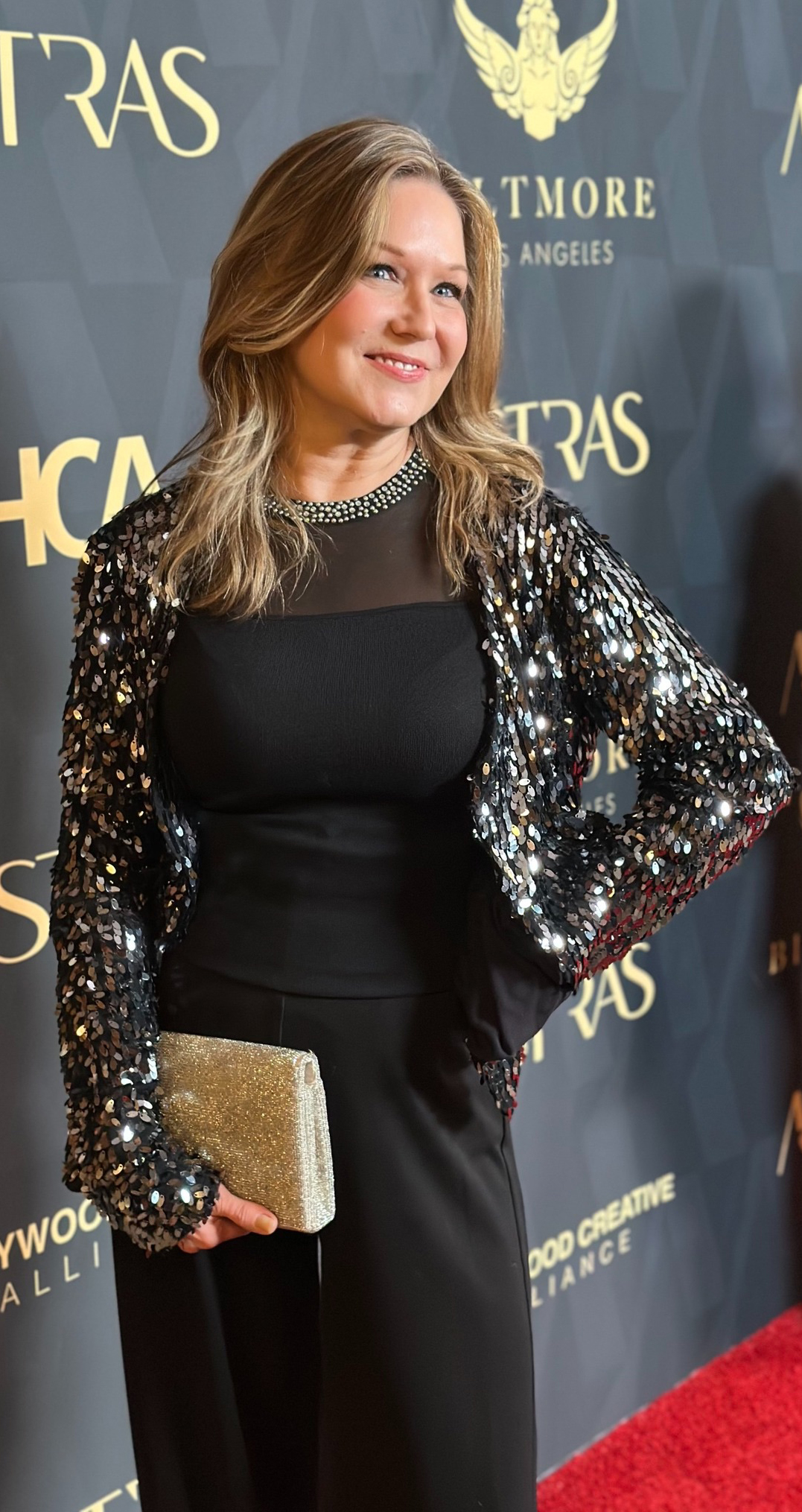
- Born: Greensburg, Pennsylvania, U.S.
- Occupations: Director, producer, showrunner
- Years active: 1999–present

Annetta Marion is an American filmmaker, director and showrunner. She has worked on major shows for networks like Netflix, Amazon, Apple+, ESPN, OWN, MTV, VH1, and Investigation Discovery, including the acclaimed Oprah's Master Class.

== Life and career ==
Marion graduated from Norwin High School in North Huntingdon, Pennsylvania, and also earned both a Bachelor of Science and Master of Science in Computer Engineering from Case Western Reserve University in Cleveland, Ohio. In 2005, she was accepted into the AFI Directing Workshop for Women, a mentorship and education program geared towards female filmmaking. Her notable projects include Oprah's Master Class, where she served as director and showrunner, and the NBC series Making It.

Marion’s latest nonfiction project was an Amazon Original Series, First To The Finish. It's an action series that is an inside look at the Mazda MX-5 car racing season. Seen mostly through the lens of three standout women in the world of motorsports, they navigate the challenges of elite racing. The film premiered in 2025 on Prime Video Sports, Annetta was the showrunner and directed all six episodes of this striking pilot season.

Marion produced and second-unit directed the award-winning Still: A Michael J. Fox Movie, which premiered at the 2023 Sundance Film Festival. The hybrid film won four Primetime Emmys, a HOPE Filmmaker Award at SXSW, and five Critics Choice Awards, scoring both BAFTA and Peabody.

Marion currently serves as an alternate on the National Board of the Directors Guild of America and on the Eastern Directors Council. She is also a member of the Academy of Television Arts & Sciences, New York Women in Film & Television, Film Fatales, Women in Film LA, BAFTA, the Alliance of Women Directors, and the Producers Guild of America.

== Selected filmography ==
Year	Title	Contribution	Note
2025	First to the Finish	Director and executive producer	6 episodes
2023	Still: A Michael J. Fox Movie	Producer and second unit director	Hybrid feature film
2011-2018	Oprah's Master Class	Director and executive producer	55 episodes
2016-2017	A Crime to Remember	Associate producer	2 episodes
2012	30 for 30	Producer	2 episodes
2006	SeeMore's Playhouse	Line producer	3 episodes
2001	Never Again	Line producer	Feature film
1999	The Dream Catcher	Line producer	Feature film

== Awards and nominations ==
Year	Result	Award	Category	Work	Ref.
2024	Nominated	BAFTA Awards	Best Documentary	Still: A Michael J. Fox Movie	
2024	Nominated	Peabody Awards	Best Documentary	Still: A Michael J. Fox Movie	
2024	Nominated	Cinema Eye Honors	Outstanding Non-Fiction Feature	Still: A Michael J. Fox Movie	
2024	Nominated	Gold Derby Awards	Documentary Feature	Still: A Michael J. Fox Movie	
2024	Won	Astra Film Awards	Best Documentary Feature	Still: A Michael J. Fox Movie	
2023	Won	Primetime Emmy Awards	Outstanding Documentary or Nonfiction Special	Still: A Michael J. Fox Movie	
2022	Won	New York Women in Film & Television	Best Dark Comedy	Park Slope Moms	
2013	Nominated	Primetime Emmy Awards	Outstanding Informational Series or Special	Oprah's Master Class	
