= Christopher Townsend =

Visual effects supervisor

- Occupation: visual effects supervisor
- Years active: 1995–present

Christopher Townsend is a visual effects supervisor. He has worked in the visual effects industry for nearly 30 years. For over a decade, he was an artist and supervisor at Industrial Light and Magic, and in 2007 became a freelance visual effects supervisor. He worked on Journey to the Center of the Earth, the first ever stereoscopic motion picture shot and released digitally, The Wolverine, Ninja Assassin, Percy Jackson & the Olympians: The Lightning Thief and Captain America: The First Avenger. He was nominated for a BAFTA and an Academy Award for Best Visual Effects for his work on Iron Man 3, oversaw nearly 3000 shots on Avengers: Age of Ultron and was the overall supervisor for Guardians of the Galaxy Vol. 2, for which he received his second nomination for an Academy Award for Best Visual Effects. He was the overall Production VFX Supervisor on Captain Marvel, and following that, for his work on Shang-Chi and the Legend of the Ten Rings, was once again nominated for an Academy Award for Best Visual Effects. For his first foray into television and streaming, in 2024 he was nominated for an Emmy, for his overall VFX Supervising on the second season of the Disney+ show Loki.

In 2015 he was given an Honorary Doctor of Arts degree by his alma mater, Coventry University.
