= Rachel Morrison =

American cinematographer and director (born 1978)

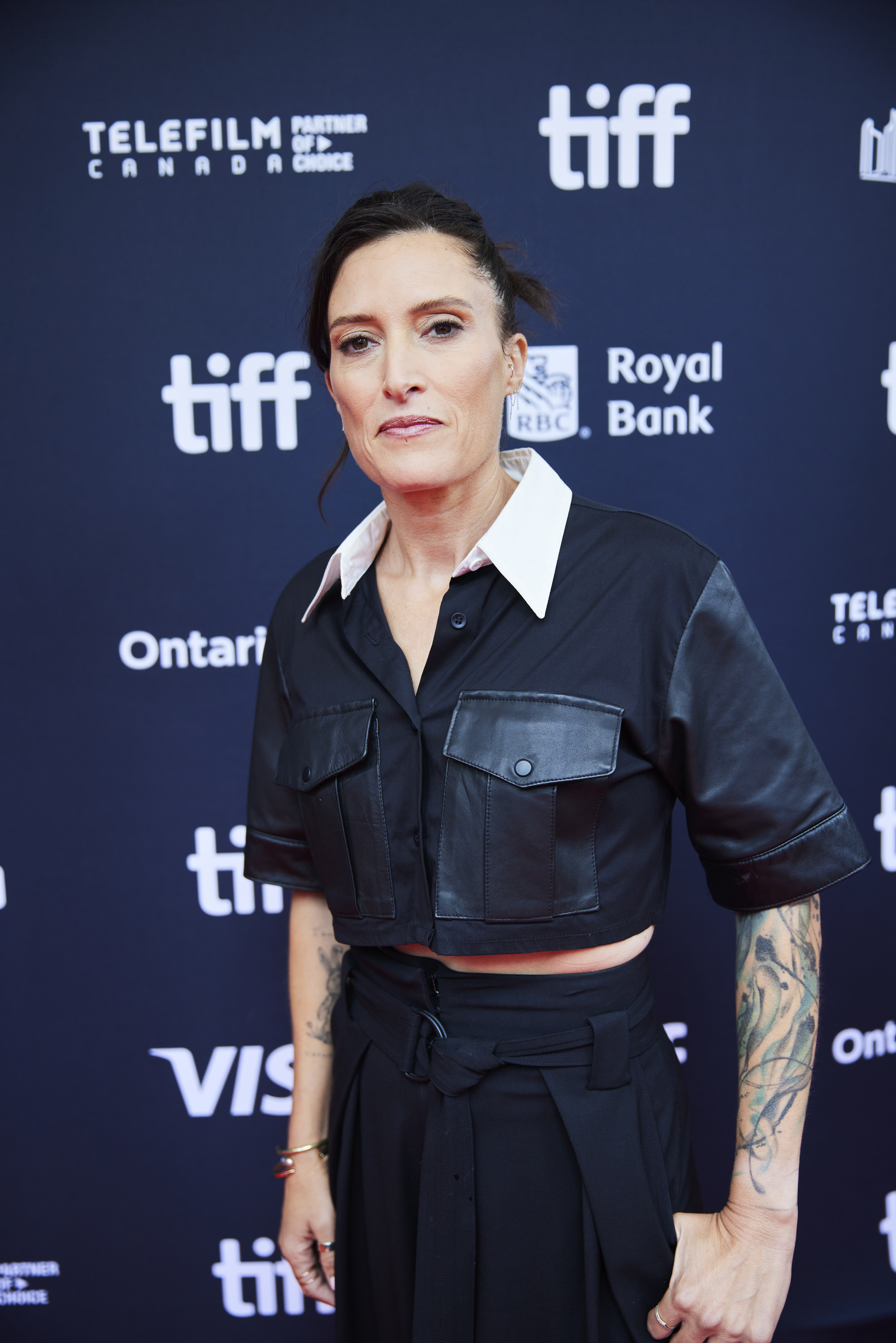
- Morrison at the 2024 Toronto International Film Festival
- Born: April 27, 1978 (age 48); Cambridge, Massachusetts, U.S.
- Education: New York University; AFI Conservatory
- Years active: 2002–present
- Spouse: Rachel Garza (m. 2011)
- Children: 2
- Website: www.rachelmorrison.com

Rachel Morrison, ASC (born April 27, 1978) is an American cinematographer and director of film and television.

For her work on Rees' Mudbound (2017), Morrison became the first woman to be nominated for an Academy Award for Best Cinematography.

Morrison made her feature film directorial debut with the biographical sports drama The Fire Inside (2024), a biopic of boxer Claressa Shields.

== Early life ==
Morrison grew up in a Jewish family in Cambridge, Massachusetts, and graduated from Concord Academy in 1996.

She took up photography at a young age, and attended New York University, where she completed a double major in film and photography because she was unable to choose between the two; by the end of her degree, she had decided to concentrate on cinematography. She then attended the AFI Conservatory's graduate cinematography program and graduated with a Master of Fine Arts in 2006. In 2018, Morrison was awarded with the 28th Franklin J. Schaffner Alumni Medal awarded to alumni of the AFI Conservatory.

== Career ==
Morrison began her career in television, working on series and telefilms for a number of networks. Her cinematography on the 2005 television documentary Rikers High, about high school education within the Rikers Island prison complex, was nominated for an Emmy Award.

Morrison worked on The Hills for two years, then shot Zal Batmanglij's Sound of My Voice, which premiered at the 2011 Sundance Film Festival. Over the next two years, she photographed Tim and Eric's Billion Dollar Movie and Fruitvale Station, which premiered at Sundance in 2012 and 2013 respectively, as well as Any Day Now (2012), Some Girl(s) (2013) and The Harvest (2013).

At the 2013 Women in Film Crystal + Lucy Awards, Morrison was awarded the Kodak Vision Award for her work in cinematography and her collaboration with other women filmmakers. The same year, Variety named her as one of the "Up Next" in their Below The Line Impact Report, while Indiewire named her as one of their "Cinematographers To Watch".

In 2014, she photographed Cake, directed by Daniel Barnz, which she followed up with the 2015 film Dope, premiered at the 2015 Sundance Film Festival, making it Morrison's seventh film to screen at the annual festival in six consecutive years.

2014 marked Morrison's first foray into directing, as she was offered the chance to direct an episode of the television series American Crime, which aired in 2015. In 2017 she became a member of the American Society of Cinematographers.

Morrison was the cinematographer for Dee Rees's 2017 film Mudbound. For her work on the film, Morrison became the first woman to win the New York Film Critics Circle Award for Best Cinematographer, the first woman to be nominated for the feature category of the American Society of Cinematographers Outstanding Achievement Awards, and the first woman ever nominated for the Academy Award for Best Cinematography.

Morrison served as cinematographer for Marvel's Black Panther (2018).

On June 19, 2019, it was announced Morrison would make her directorial debut on Flint Strong, which was later retitled The Fire Inside and released in 2024.

In March 2023, Morrison directed an episode of the Star Wars streaming series The Mandalorian season 3. In 2025, she began directing the film Love of Your Life, starring Margaret Qualley, Patrick Schwarzenegger, Aaron Pierre and Gabriel Basso.

In addition to filmmaking, Morrison is also a faculty member of the Maine Media College.

== Personal life ==
Morrison married Rachel Garza in December 2011. They have a son, who was born in 2014, and a daughter born in 2018.

== Filmography ==
=== Cinematographer ===
==== Feature film ====
Year	Title	Director	Notes
2007	Palo Alto	Brad Leong	
2011	Sound of My Voice	Zal Batmanglij	
2011	Dorfman in Love	Brad Leong	
2012	Tim and Eric's Billion Dollar Movie	Tim Heidecker; Eric Wareheim	
2012	Any Day Now	Travis Fine	
2013	Fruitvale Station	Ryan Coogler	
2013	Some Girl(s)	Daisy von Scherler Mayer	
2013	The Harvest	John McNaughton	
2014	Little Accidents	Sara Colangelo	
2014	Druid Peak	Marni Zelnick	
2014	Cake	Daniel Barnz	
2015	Dope	Rick Famuyiwa	
2017	Mudbound	Dee Rees	
2018	Black Panther	Ryan Coogler	
2019	Seberg	Benedict Andrews	
2021	Absolutely Accidental	Jake Schick	

==== Television ====
Year	Title	Director	Notes
2003–2009	Room Raiders		
2007	Newport Harbor: The Real Orange County	Gary Shaffer	
2008–2009	The Hills	Hisham Abed	24 episodes
2011	Funny or Die Presents...	Ken Marino; Matt Piedmont; Jordan Vogt-Roberts	1 episode
2020	Homemade	Herself	Episode "The Lucky Ones"
2021	VAX LIVE: The Concert to Reunite the World	Ryan Polito	TV special

TV movies

Year	Title	Director
2016	Confirmation	Rick Famuyiwa
2023	Play is your superpower	Ellen Kuras

=== Documentary works ===
TV series

Year	Title	Director	Notes
2011	Visionaries: Inside the Creative Mind	Michael Bonfiglio	Segment "Will.i.am"
2012-2013	Oprah's Master Class	Michael Bonfiglio; Joe Berlinger; Andrew Flakelar; Annetta Marion	5 episodes
2014	The System with Joe Berlinger	Joe Berlinger	Episode "False Confessions"
2022	They Call Me Magic	Rick Famuyiwa	

=== Director ===
Film

- The Fire Inside (2024)
- Love of Your Life (2026)

Television

Year	Title	Episode(s)
2015	Quantico	"Kill"
2015–2016	American Crime	Episode 8
2015–2016	American Crime	Season 2: Episode 5
2020	Homemade	"The Lucky Ones" (Also writer)
2020–2021	Hightown	"Love You Like a Sister"
2020–2021	Hightown	"Severely Weatherbeaten"
2020–2021	Hightown	"Great White"
2020–2021	Hightown	"Girl Power"
2021	The Morning Show	"A Private Person"
2021	American Crime Story	"Stand by Your Man"
2021	American Crime Story	"The Grand Jury"
2023	The Mandalorian	"Chapter 18: The Mines of Mandalore"
2027	The Savant	"Crossing a Line"
2027	The Savant	Episode 5

== Awards and nominations ==
Year	Award	Category	Title	Result	Ref.
2017	Academy Awards	Best Cinematography	Mudbound	Nominated	
2017	American Society of Cinematographers	Outstanding Cinematography	Mudbound	Nominated	
2017	Critics' Choice Movie Awards	Best Cinematography	Mudbound	Nominated	
2012	News and Documentary Emmy Awards	Outstanding Achievement in a Craft: Cinematography	Rikers High	Nominated	
2017	New York Film Critics Circle	Best Cinematographer	Mudbound	Won	
2017	Los Angeles Online Film Critics Society	Best Cinematography	Mudbound	Nominated	
2016	Primetime Emmy Awards	Outstanding Cinematography for a Nonfiction Program	What Happened, Miss Simone?	Nominated	
2018	Satellite Awards	Best Cinematography	Black Panther	Nominated	
2017	Washington D.C. Area Film Critics Association	Best Cinematography	Mudbound	Nominated	
2013	Women in Film Crystal + Lucy Awards	Kodak Vision Award	—N/a	Won	
