= Oprah's Master Class =

- Also known as: Oprah Presents: Master Class
- Genre: Reality; Biography
- Directed by: Michael Bonfiglio; Joe Berlinger; Annetta Marion; Bruce Sinofsky
- Presented by: Oprah Winfrey
- Country of origin: United States
- No. of seasons: 6
- No. of episodes: 52

Production
- Executive producers: Oprah Winfrey; Joe Berlinger; Jon Kamen; Justin Wilkes; Jonathan Sinclair; Robert Friedman
- Running time: 40 to 44 minutes
- Production companies: Harpo Studios; @radical.media

Original release
- Network: Oprah Winfrey Network
- Release: January 1, 2011 – January 15, 2018

Oprah's Master Class (or Oprah Presents: Master Class, as it was titled in the first season) is a primetime television program that airs on the Oprah Winfrey Network. The series premiered on the network's first day, January 1, 2011.

== Concept ==
According to OWN, Master Class "tells the stories you've never heard from the people you thought you knew best. Hand-picked by Oprah Winfrey for their unique impact on the world, true modern masters from Academy Award-winning actors, to Grammy-winning musicians, to ground-breaking athletes, share the greatest lessons they've learned along the way. In an intimate setting, they share their successes, failures, triumphs, disappointments and heartbreaks."

Each episode features an in-depth conversation with the subject, as they explore their story with viewers. The conversation is split up into numerous lessons that each master teaches, using personal anecdotes from their life to illustrate the point. Video clips, photographs, and re-enactments illustrate a visual representation of the stories being told. The biographical sketch is interspersed with personal insights and reflections from Oprah Winfrey on each master's life lessons.

== Overview ==
Season	Episodes	Timeslot (EST)	Originally released	
Season	Episodes	Timeslot (EST)	First released	Last released
1	8	Sunday 10:00 PM	January 1, 2011	April 3, 2011
2	10	Sunday 10:00 PM	January 8, 2012	April 29, 2012
3	8	Sunday 10:00 PM	March 3, 2013	June 16, 2013
4	10	Sunday 10:00 PM	May 11, 2014	August 3, 2014
5	7	Sunday 8:00 PM	October 25, 2015	December 6, 2015
6	9	Saturday 10:00 PM	June 10, 2017	January 15, 2018

== Episodes ==
=== Season One (2011) ===
The first season of Oprah Presents: Master Class premiered on Saturday January 1, 2011 on the first day of the launch of OWN: Oprah Winfrey Network, with rapper, songwriter, and entrepreneur Jay-Z. The first season aired weekly on Sundays at 10/9c and consists of eight hour-long episodes.

No. overall	No. in season	Modern master	Occupation	Original release date
1	1	Jay-Z	Rapper, songwriter, entrepreneur, co-owner of the Brooklyn Nets	January 1, 2011
2	2	Diane Sawyer	Television journalist	January 2, 2011
3	3	Maya Angelou	Poet, civil rights activist, dancer, film producer, television producer, playwright, film director, author, actress, professor	January 16, 2011
4	4	Simon Cowell	A&R executive, television producer, television personality, entrepreneur	January 23, 2011
5	5	Lorne Michaels	Canadian television producer, creator of Saturday Night Live	January 30, 2011
6	6	Condoleezza Rice	Former United States Secretary of State	February 13, 2011
7	7	Oprah Winfrey (Part 1)	Talk show host, media proprietor, actress	March 27, 2011
8	8	Oprah Winfrey (Part 2)	Talk show host, media proprietor, actress	April 3, 2011

=== Season Two (2012) ===
The second season of Oprah's Master Class premiered on Sunday January 8, 2012 at 10/9c on OWN: Oprah Winfrey Network with actress, writer, and activist Jane Fonda. The second season premiered to record-high numbers for the series, with 930,000 viewers tuning into Fonda's Master Class. The second season aired weekly on Sundays at 10/9c and consists of ten hour-long episodes.

No. overall	No. in season	Modern master	Occupation	Original release date	U.S. viewers (millions)
9	1	Jane Fonda	Actress, writer, political activist, former fashion model, fitness guru	January 8, 2012	0.93
10	2	Goldie Hawn	Actress, film director, producer, author, singer	January 15, 2012	0.47
11	3	Morgan Freeman	Actor, film director, aviator, narrator	January 22, 2012	0.50
12	4	Ted Turner	Media mogul, philanthropist, chairman of United Nations Foundation board of directors	January 29, 2012	0.49
13	5	Laird Hamilton	American big-wave surfer, co-inventor of tow-in surfing, model	February 12, 2012	0.17
14	6	Reba McEntire	American country music artist, actress	March 4, 2012	0.60
15	7	Jon Bon Jovi	Musician, singer, songwriter, actor	March 25, 2012	0.43
16	8	Grant Hill	Professional basketball player for the Phoenix Suns of the NBA, philanthropist	April 1, 2012	0.34
17	9	Sidney Poitier (Part 1)	Actor, film director, author, diplomat	April 22, 2012	0.40
18	10	Sidney Poitier (Part 2)	Actor, film director, author, diplomat	April 29, 2012	0.32

=== Season Three (2013) ===
The third season of Oprah's Master Class premiered on March 3, 2013, at 10/9c with an episode featuring singer-songwriter Alicia Keys. The third season aired weekly on Sundays at 10/9c and consists of eight hour-long episodes.

No. overall	No. in season	Modern master	Occupation	Original release date	U.S. viewers (millions)
19	1	Alicia Keys	Singer-songwriter, actress	March 3, 2013	0.45
20	2	Cindy Crawford	Model, social activist, designer	March 10, 2013 March 10, 2013	0.44
21	3	Tom Brokaw	Television journalist, author	March 17, 2013 March 17, 2013	0.33
22	4	Stevie Nicks	Singer-songwriter, musician	March 24, 2013 March 24, 2013	0.38
23	5	Lenny Kravitz	Singer-songwriter, multi-instrumentalist, record producer, actor and arranger	June 2, 2013 June 2, 2013	0.76
24	6	Susan Sarandon	Actress, political and social activist	June 9, 2013 June 9, 2013	0.36
25	7	Berry Gordy	Record producer, founder of Motown record label, songwriter, film producer, television producer	June 16, 2013 June 16, 2013	0.32
26	8	Diahann Carroll	Television and stage actress, singer	June 16, 2013 June 16, 2013	0.31

=== Season Four (2014) ===
Oprah's Master Class returned to OWN on May 11, 2014, with an episode featuring Justin Timberlake. The fourth season aired weekly on Sundays at 10/9c and consists of ten hour-long episodes.

No. overall	No. in season	Modern master	Occupation	Original release date
27	1	Justin Timberlake	Singer-songwriter, actor, record producer, philanthropist	May 11, 2014 May 11, 2014
28	2	Whoopi Goldberg	Actress, comedian, producer, author, singer, activist, talk show host	June 1, 2014 June 1, 2014
29	3	Tim McGraw	Singer-songwriter, actor	June 8, 2014 June 8, 2014
30	4	Robin Roberts	Newscaster	June 15, 2014 June 15, 2014
31	5	Lionel Richie	Singer-songwriter, musician, record producer, actor	June 22, 2014 June 22, 2014
32	6	Barbara Walters	Journalist, newscaster, producer, author, talk show host	June 29, 2014 June 29, 2014
33	7	Vanessa L. Williams	Singer, actress, producer	July 13, 2014 July 13, 2014
34	8	Billy Bob Thornton	Actor, director, screenwriter, musician	July 20, 2014 July 20, 2014
35	9	Sharon Stone	Actress, producer, model	July 27, 2014 July 27, 2014
36	10	Cicely Tyson	Actress	August 3, 2014 August 3, 2014

=== Season Five (2015) ===
Oprah's Master Class returned to OWN on Sunday October 25, 2015 with an episode featuring Ellen DeGeneres. The fifth season aired weekly on Sundays at 8/7c and consists of seven hour-long episodes.

No. overall	No. in season	Modern master	Occupation	Original release date	U.S. viewers (millions)
37	1	Ellen DeGeneres	Comedian, television host, actress, writer, producer, designer	October 25, 2015	0.56
38	2	Smokey Robinson	Singer-songwriter, record producer, record executive	November 1, 2015	0.47
39	3	Robert Duvall	Actor, director	November 8, 2015	0.19
40	4	Dwayne Johnson	Actor, producer, professional wrestler	November 15, 2015	0.40
41	5	Patti LaBelle	Singer-songwriter, actress	November 22, 2015	0.52
42	6	James Taylor	Singer-songwriter, musician	November 26, 2015	0.17
43	7	Jeff Bridges	Actor, singer, producer	December 6, 2015	0.17

=== Season Six (2017-18) ===
Oprah's Master Class returned to OWN on Saturday June 10, 2017 with a sneak-preview episode featuring Kevin Hart.

No. overall	No. in season	Modern master	Occupation	Original release date	U.S. viewers (millions)
44	1	Kevin Hart	Actor, comedian, writer, producer	June 10, 2017 June 10, 2017	0.39
45	2	Tyler Perry	Actor, comedian, filmmaker, producer, writer, songwriter	August 22, 2017 August 22, 2017	1.13
46	3	Lynn Whitfield	Actress, producer	August 23, 2017 August 23, 2017	0.66
47	4	Steve Harvey	Standup comic, television host, radio host, author	September 2, 2017 September 2, 2017	0.47
48	5	LL Cool J	Rapper, actor, author, entrepreneur	September 9, 2017 September 9, 2017	N/A
49	6	Shaquille O'Neal	Professional basketball player, sports analyst, rapper, author	September 16, 2017 September 16, 2017	0.34
50	7	Usher	Singer, songwriter, dancer, actor	September 23, 2017 September 23, 2017	0.32
51	8	Gladys Knight	Singer, songwriter, actress, author	September 23, 2017 September 23, 2017	0.39
52	9	John Lewis	Politician, civil rights leader	January 15, 2018 January 15, 2018	N/A

== Specials ==
No.	Title	Original release date
SP1	"Special Edition"	May 6, 2012
SP2	"Civil Rights Special"	January 4, 2015
SP3	"Belief Special"	October 11, 2015

== Awards and nominations ==
Year	Award	Category	Result
2012	43rd NAACP Image Awards	Outstanding Variety Series or Special	Won
2012	18th Annual NAMIC Vision Awards	News/ Informational Show	Won
2012	Gracie Awards	Outstanding Portrait/Biography	Won
2013	44th NAACP Image Awards	Outstanding Variety Series or Special	Nominated
2013	19th Annual NAMIC Vision Awards	News/ Informational Show	Won
2013	65th Primetime Creative Arts Emmy Awards	Outstanding Informational Series or Special	Nominated
2014	45th NAACP Image Awards	Outstanding Variety Series or Special	Nominated
2015	46th NAACP Image Awards	Outstanding Variety Series or Special	Won
2015	21st Annual NAMIC Vision Awards	News/ Informational Show ("Cicely Tyson")	Won
2015	Gracie Awards	Outstanding Portrait/Biography	Won
2016	47th NAACP Image Awards	Outstanding Variety Series or Special	Nominated
2016	22nd Annual NAMIC Vision Awards	News/ Informational Show	Nominated
2016	Gracie Awards	Outstanding Portrait/Biography	Won
2018	49th NAACP Image Awards	Outstanding News / Information – (Series or Special)	Nominated

== International broadcast ==
- Australia — The series premiered on Discovery Home & Health from October 27, 2013.
