= Nikyatu Jusu =

American screenwriter

- Education: Duke University, New York University
- Occupation: Filmmaker
- Notable work: Nanny
- Awards: Sundance Grand Jury Prize - Dramatic (2022)

Nikyatu Jusu (/nɪkˈjɑːtuː ˈdʒuːsuː/) is an American independent writer, director, producer, editor and assistant professor in film and video at George Mason University. Jusu's works center on the complexities of Black female characters and in particular, displaced, immigrant women in the United States. Her work includes African Booty Scratcher (2007), Flowers (2015), Suicide By Sunlight (2019), and Nanny, which received the Grand Jury Prize at the 2022 Sundance Film Festival.

== Early life and education ==
Jusu was born in Atlanta, Georgia, to Sierra Leonean parents Hannah Khoury and Ronald Jusu. She attended Duke University in Durham, North Carolina with the intention to become a biomedical engineer. An unexpected meeting with a screenwriting professor introduced her to the world of filmmaking and she changed her focus. Jusu graduated with a Bachelor of Arts in Film/Cinema/Video Studies in 2005. She later studied narrative filmmaking at New York University's Tisch graduate film school and received a Master of Fine Arts in Film/Cinema/Video Studies in 2011.

== Career ==
=== 2008 – 2018: Career beginnings ===
In 2008, Jusu wrote and directed African Booty Scratcher for her second-year graduate film project at NYU Tisch. It is a semi-autobiographical film that tells the story of Isatu, a young Sierra Leonean American. The story highlights the conflict of differing cultures while Isatu contemplates which culture to please when picking a prom dress. She developed the film with a budget of $7,000. African Booty Scratcher was eventually acquired by HBO.

Jusu released Say Grace Before Drowning in 2010, again as writer and director. With a bigger budget of $35,000, Jusu created a film that explains the relationship between a young girl and her African refugee mother. This film was also acquired by HBO.

In 2011, she wrote and directed the narrative film, Black Swan Theory, that was labeled as an experimental work. The plot of the film revolves around Sonya, a psychiatric casualty of war, who accepts a murder-for-hire assignment. Jusu's developed the film on a budget of $3,000.

Jusu began developing a feature film, FREE THE TOWN in 2013. The film follows three people in Freetown, Sierra Leone and was selected for inclusion in Sundance Institute's inaugural Diverse Writers Workshop.

She co-wrote and co-directed Flowers in 2015 with Yvonne Michelle Shirley, a classmate from film school. The coming-of-age film tells the story of two Brooklyn teens looking to get revenge on their teacher until their plan backfires. Jusu explained that she wanted to draw attention to the struggles of black girls in school because she feels that only black boys are in the spotlight of struggle in the United States education system. Flowers was shown at film festivals such as BlackStar Film Festival. It was acquired by HBO and received the HBO Short Film Award.

=== 2017 – present: Suicide by Sunlight and Nanny ===
In 2017, Jusu joined the faculty of George Mason University as an assistant professor in the film and video studies department. That year she was selected as a recipient of Tribeca Film Institute and Chanel's Through Her Lens program to develop the short film Suicide by Sunlight, co-written with R. Shanea Williams. Suicide by Sunlight centers a Black vampire protected from the sun because of her melanin. The film was executive produced by Terence Nance, directed by Jusu, and stars Natalie Paul. It debuted at the 2019 Sundance Film Festival on January 25, 2019.

On April 13, 2021, it was announced that Jusu's debut feature film, Nanny, was being produced by Stay Gold Features and Topic Studios. The horror film follows a west African undocumented nanny taking care of a privileged child on the Upper West Side and preparing for the arrival of her son. The script was selected for the 2020 Black List and the film debuted at the 2022 Sundance Film Festival on January 22, 2022. Shortly after Nanny won the Grand Jury Prize in the U.S. Dramatic Competition, Blumhouse Productions and Amazon Studios acquired the film and released it theatrically on November 23, 2022 and then streaming on Amazon Prime Video on December 16, 2022. In February 2022, it was announced that Jusu's next horror film project was acquired by Monkeypaw Productions and Universal Pictures. In October 2022, it was announced that Jusu signed on to direct a sequel to Night of the Living Dead (1968). In November 2022, Jusu revealed that her untitled horror film with Monkeypaw would be a feature length adaptation of her short film Suicide by Sunlight.

== Accolades ==
- The Most Promising Filmmaker Award from Duke University.
- African Booty Scratcher: Directors Guild Honorable Mention, HBO Short Film Award and JT3 Artist Award.
- Say Grace Before Drowning: Spike Lee Fellowship Award, Directors Guild of America Jury Award, HBO Short Film Award, the Panavision Equipment Grant, Princess Grace Foundation Grant, and Puffin Foundation Grant.
- Shadow and Act Filmmaker Challenge winner forBlack Swan Theory.
- Flowers: HBO short film award.
- Her screenplay Free The Town was selected for Africa's most prestigious Film Market, the 2013 Durban Film Mart, and one of 5 narrative films selected for Film Independent's Fast Track. It was one of 12 projects invited to participate in Sundance Institute's inaugural Diverse Writers Workshop. Free the Town was never shot because of the Ebola outbreak.
- Her narrative film Suicide by Sunlight was awarded a Rooftop Films/Adrienne Shelly Foundation Short Film Grant and was funded by the production grant Through Her Lens: The Tribeca Chanel Women's Filmmaker Program sponsored by the Tribeca Film Institute and Chanel. The film was one of the 5 to be nominated, and won the grand prize.

== Filmography ==
Short film

Year	Title	Director	Writer	Editor
2007	African Booty Scratcher	Yes	Yes	Yes
2010	Train	No	No	Yes
2010	Say Grace Before Drowning	Yes	Yes	Yes
2011	Black Swan Theory	Yes	Yes	Yes
2015	Flowers	Yes	Yes	No
2019	Suicide by Sunlight	Yes	Yes	No

Feature film

Year	Title	Director	Writer	Producer
2022	Nanny	Yes	Yes	Executive

Television

Year	Title	Notes
2019	Two Sentence Horror Stories	Episode: "Only Child"

== Awards and nominations ==
Year	Award	Category	Nominated work	Result
2016	American Black Film Festival	Short Film Award	Flowers	Won
2020	Black Reel Awards	Outstanding Independent Short Film	Suicide by Sunlight	Nominated
2019	Sundance Film Festival	Short Film Grand Jury Prize	Suicide by Sunlight	Nominated
2022	Sundance Film Festival	U.S. Dramatic Competition Grand Jury Prize	Nanny	Won
