= 83rd Academy Awards =

- Official poster
- Date: February 27, 2011
- Site: Kodak Theatre; Hollywood, Los Angeles, California, U.S.
- Hosted by: James Franco; Anne Hathaway
- Preshow hosts: Tim Gunn; Maria Menounos; Robin Roberts; Krista Smith
- Produced by: Bruce Cohen; Don Mischer
- Directed by: Don Mischer

Highlights
- Best Picture: The King's Speech
- Most awards: Inception and The King's Speech (4)
- Most nominations: The King's Speech (12)

TV in the United States
- Network: ABC
- Duration: 3 hours, 16 minutes
- Ratings: 37.9 million 21.2% (Nielsen ratings)

The 83rd Academy Awards ceremony, organized by the Academy of Motion Picture Arts and Sciences (AMPAS), honored the best films of 2010 in the United States and took place on February 27, 2011, at the Kodak Theatre in Hollywood, Los Angeles, beginning at 5:30 p.m. PST (8:30 p.m. EST). During the ceremony, Academy Awards (commonly called the Oscars) were presented in 24 competitive categories. The ceremony was televised in the United States by ABC, and produced by Bruce Cohen and Don Mischer, with Mischer also serving as director. Actors James Franco and Anne Hathaway co-hosted the ceremony, marking the first time for each.

In related events, the Academy held its second annual Governors Awards ceremony at the Grand Ballroom of the Hollywood and Highland Center on November 13, 2010. On February 12, 2011, in a ceremony at the Beverly Wilshire Hotel in Beverly Hills, California, the Academy Awards for Technical Achievement were presented by host Marisa Tomei.

The King's Speech won four awards, including Best Picture. Other winners included Inception with four awards, The Social Network with three, Alice in Wonderland, The Fighter, and Toy Story 3 with two, and Black Swan, God of Love, In a Better World, Inside Job, The Lost Thing, Strangers No More, and The Wolfman with one. The telecast garnered almost 38 million viewers in the United States.

== Winners and nominees ==
The nominees for the 83rd Academy Awards were announced on January 25, 2011, at 5:38 a.m. PST at the Samuel Goldwyn Theater in Beverly Hills, California by Tom Sherak, president of the Academy, and actress Mo'Nique. The King's Speech led the nominations with twelve, followed by True Grit with ten.

The winners were announced during the awards ceremony on February 27, 2011. Toy Story 3 became the third animated film to be nominated for Best Picture. True Grit was the second film after 2002's Gangs of New York to lose all ten of its nominations. By virtue of his nomination for Best Actor in 127 Hours, host James Franco became the first person since Paul Hogan, who was a co-host and a Best Original Screenplay nominee during the 59th ceremony in 1987, to host the ceremony while receiving a nomination in the same year. He was also the first acting nominee since Michael Caine at the 45th ceremony in 1973 to achieve this distinction. With Christian Bale and Melissa Leo's respective wins in the Best Supporting Actor and Best Supporting Actress categories, The Fighter became the first film since 1986's Hannah and Her Sisters to win both supporting acting categories.

=== Awards ===
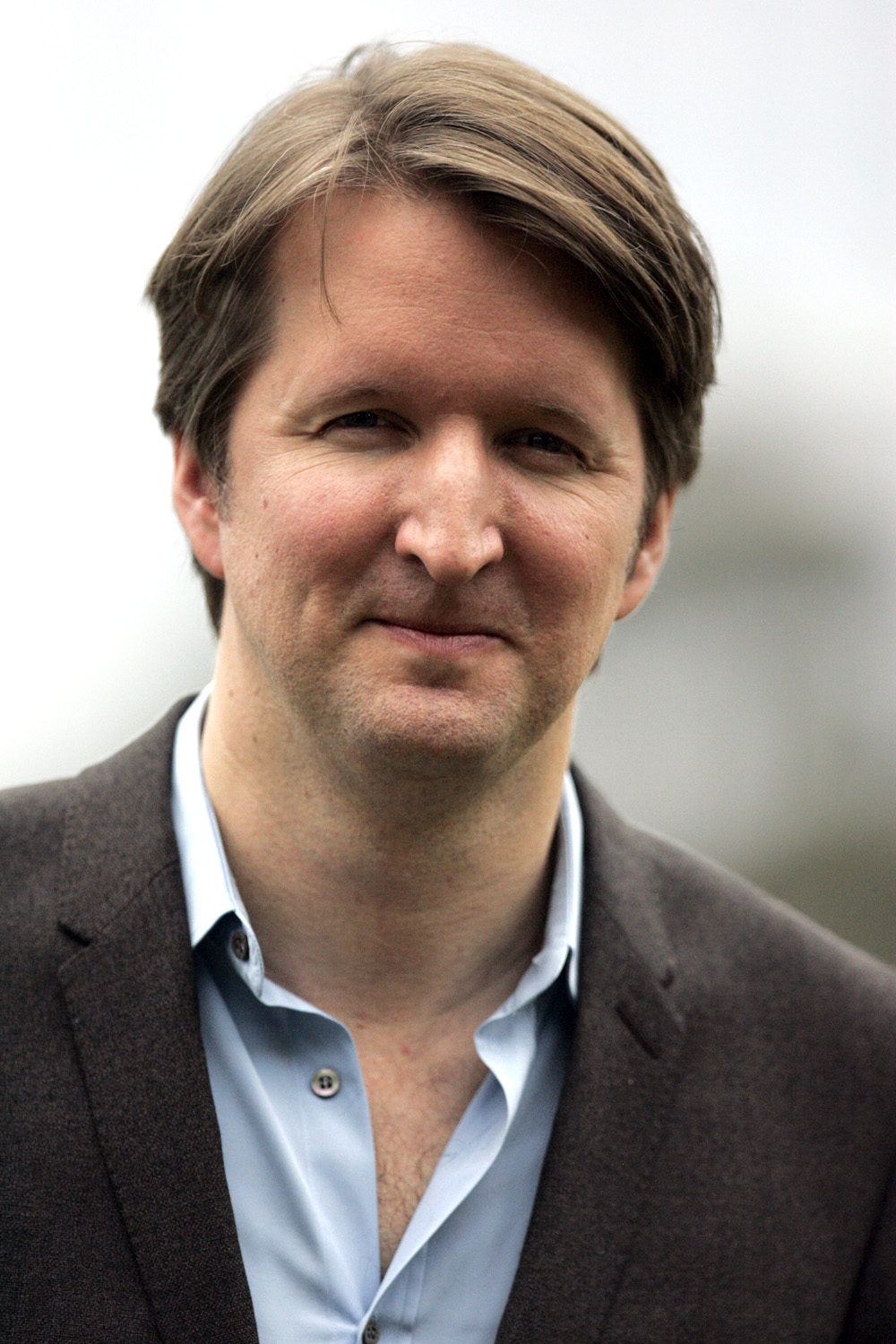
Tom Hooper, Best Director winner

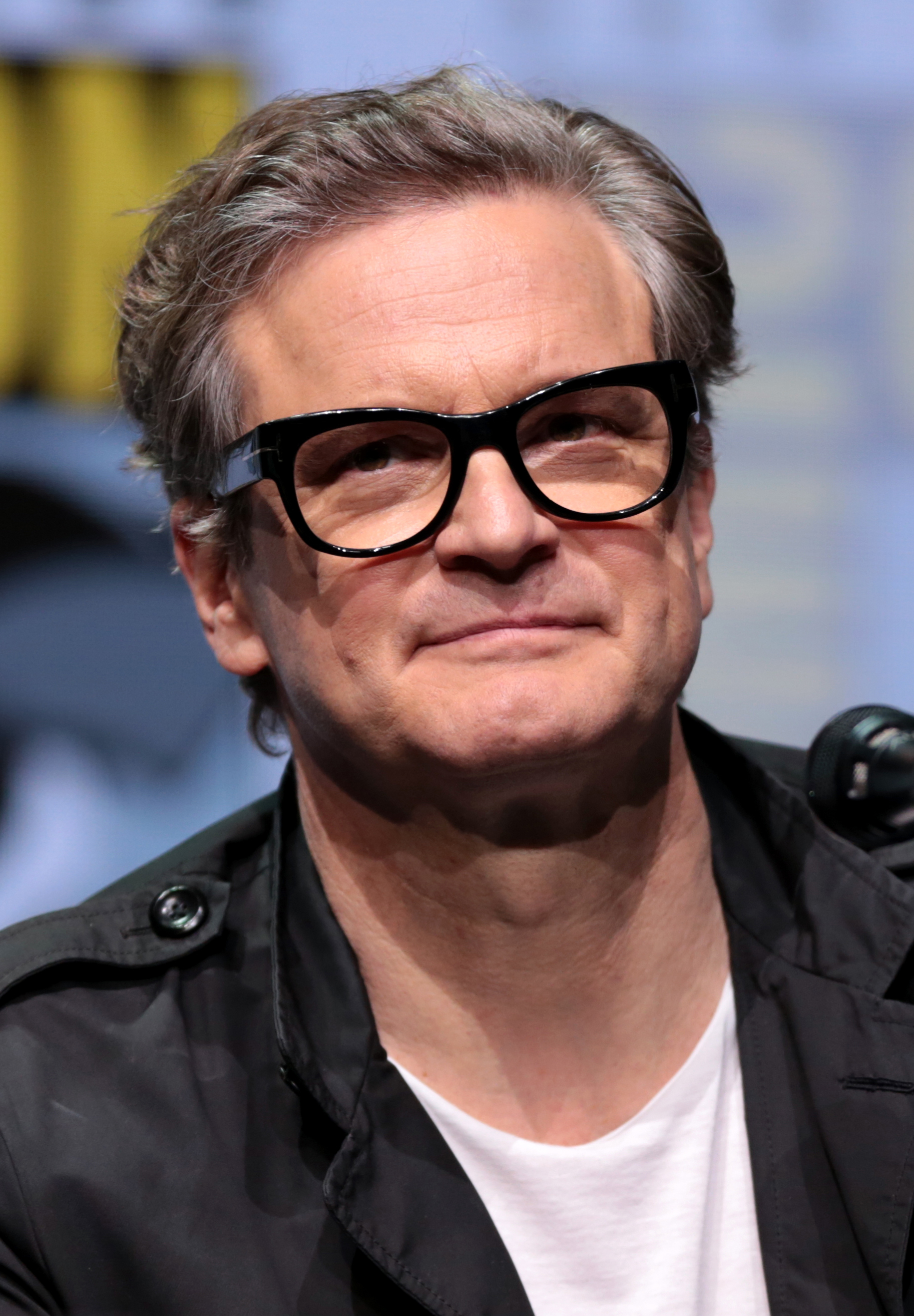
Colin Firth, Best Actor winner

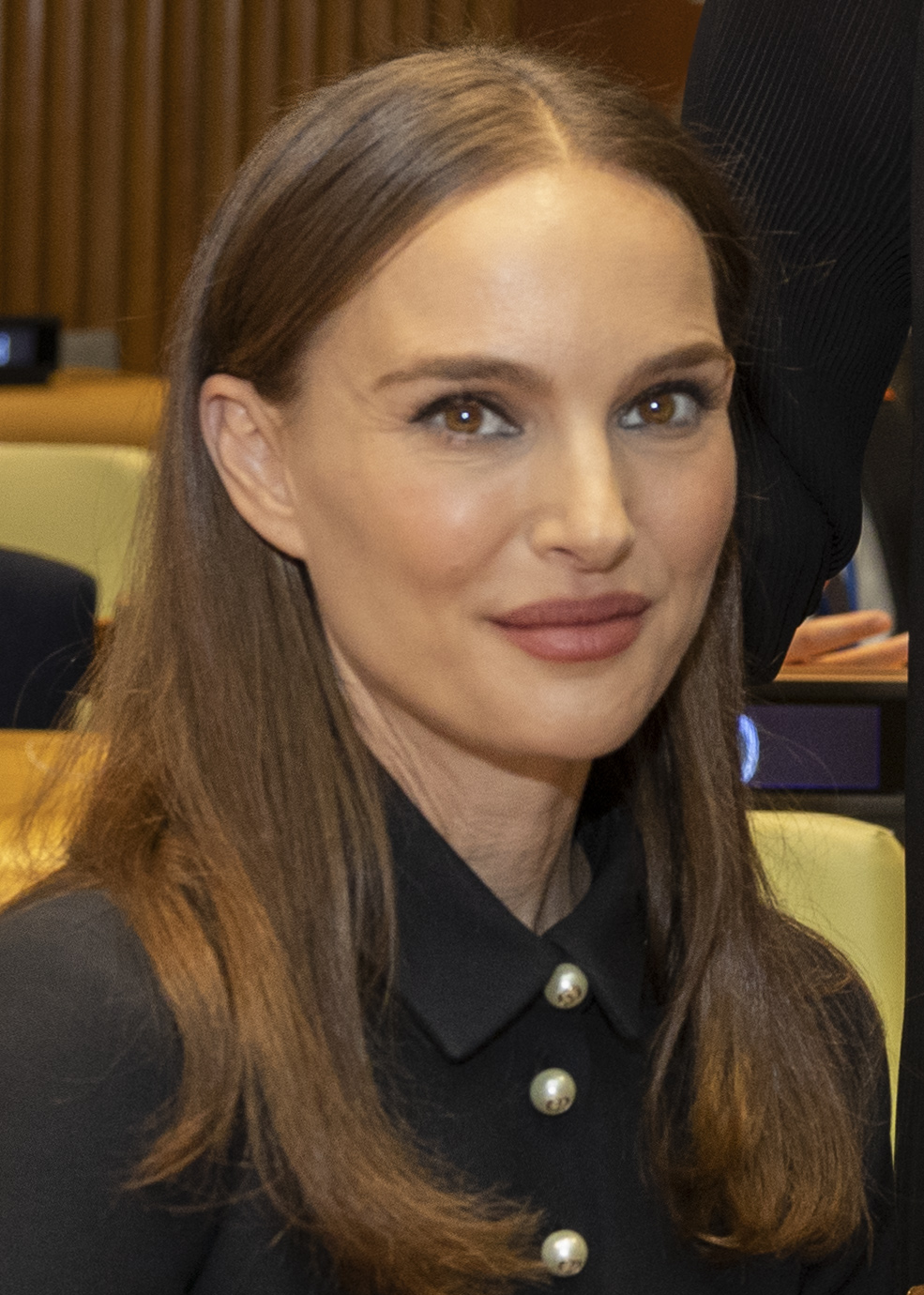
Natalie Portman, Best Actress winner

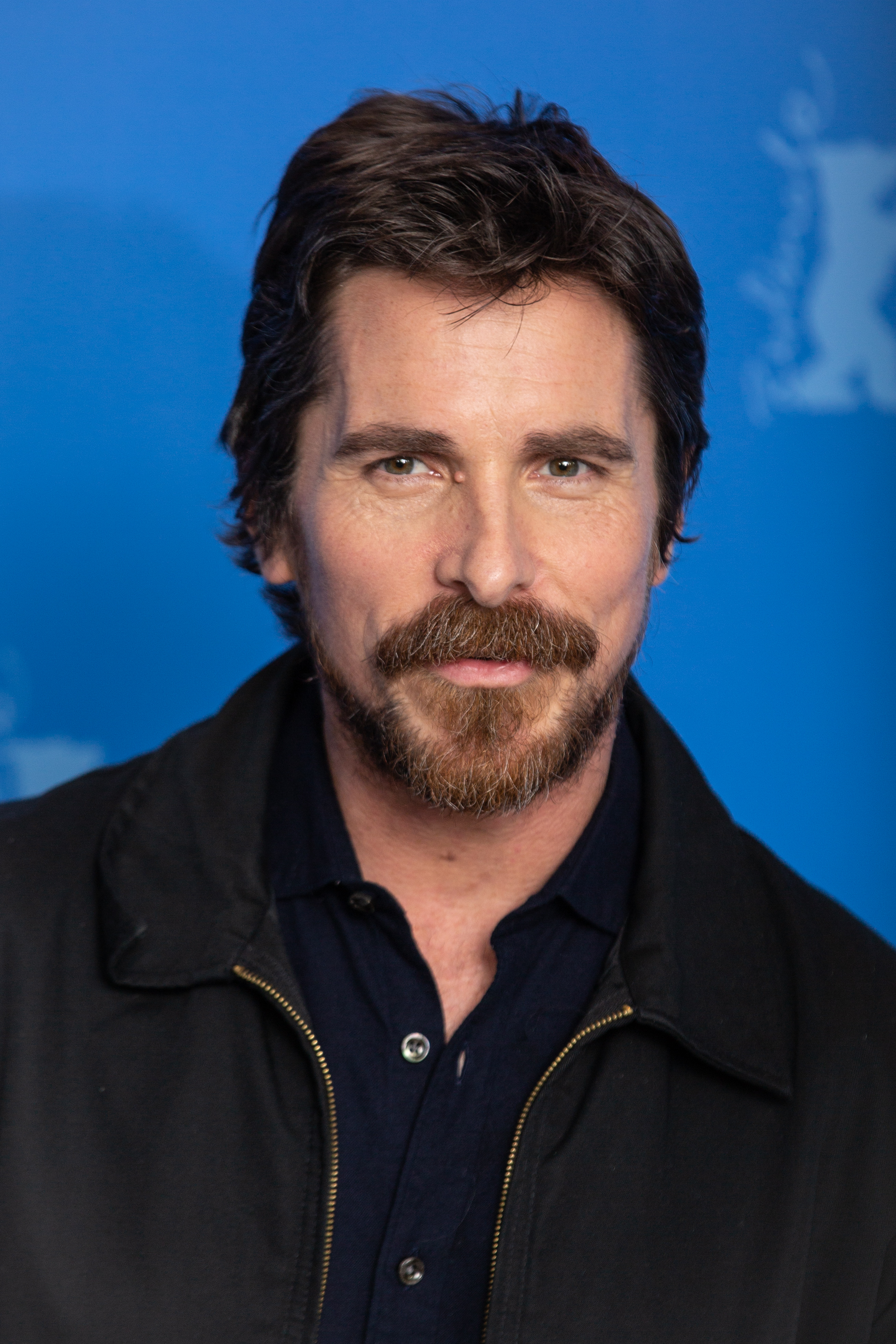
Christian Bale, Best Supporting Actor winner

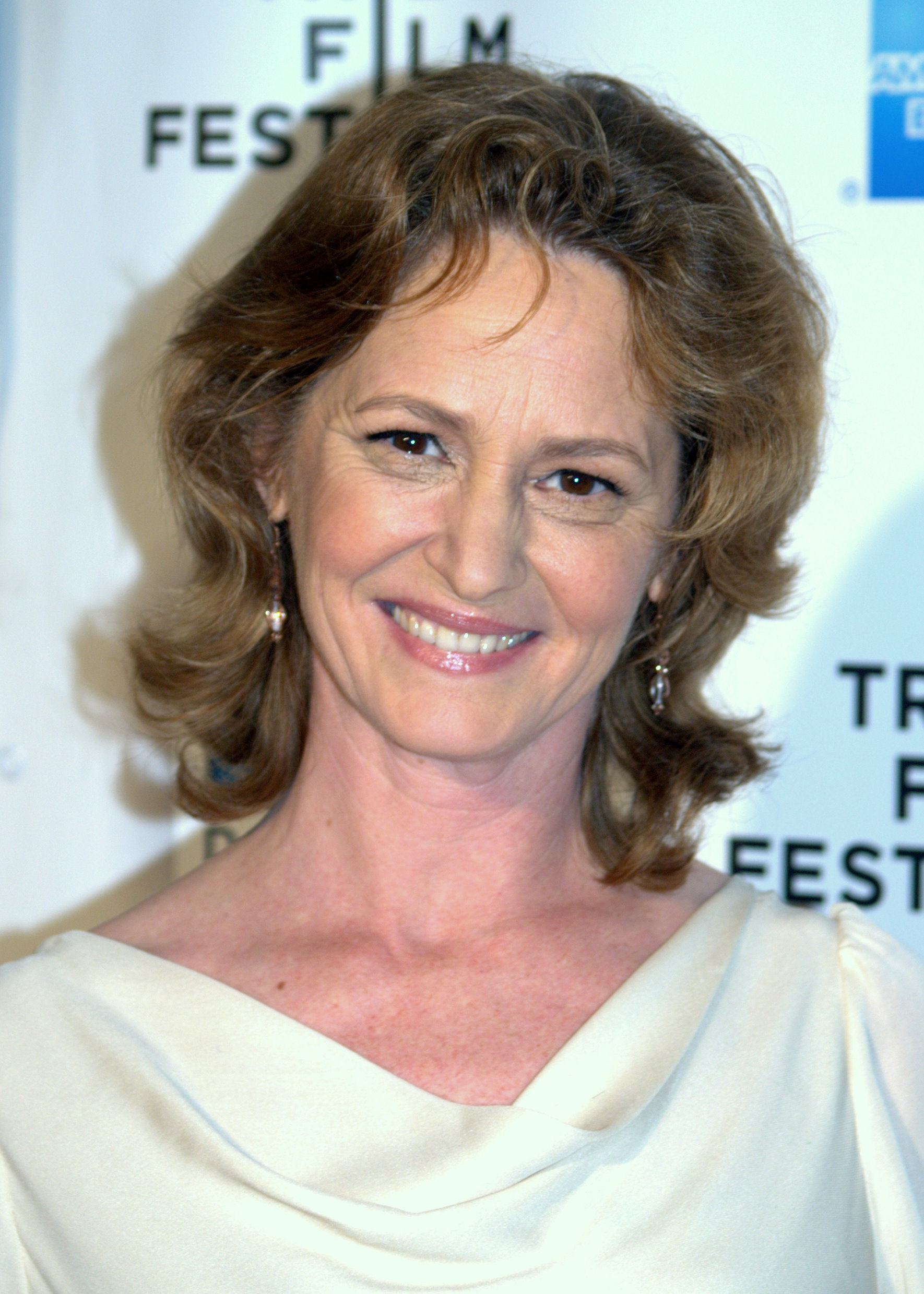
Melissa Leo, Best Supporting Actress winner

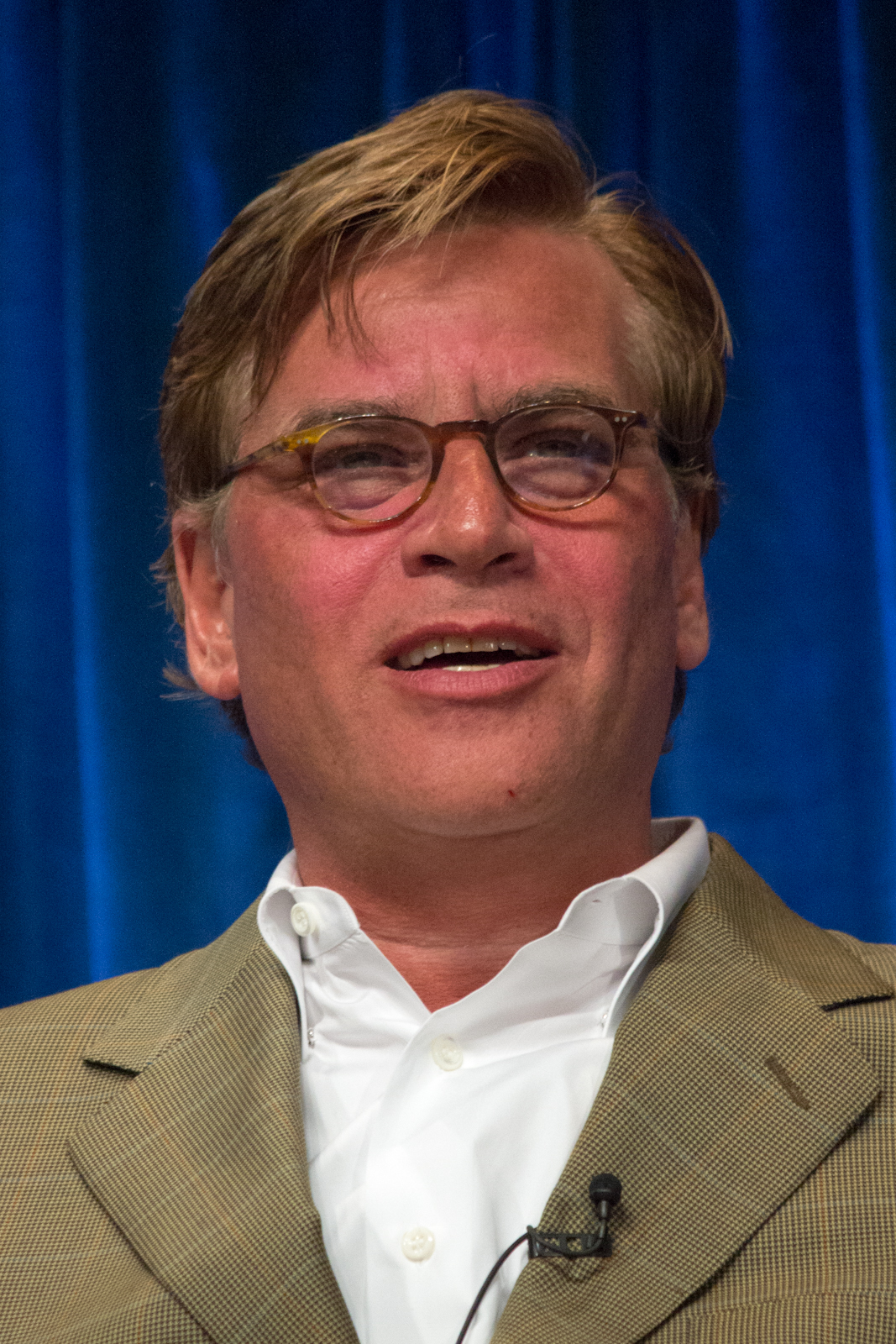
Aaron Sorkin, Best Adapted Screenplay winner

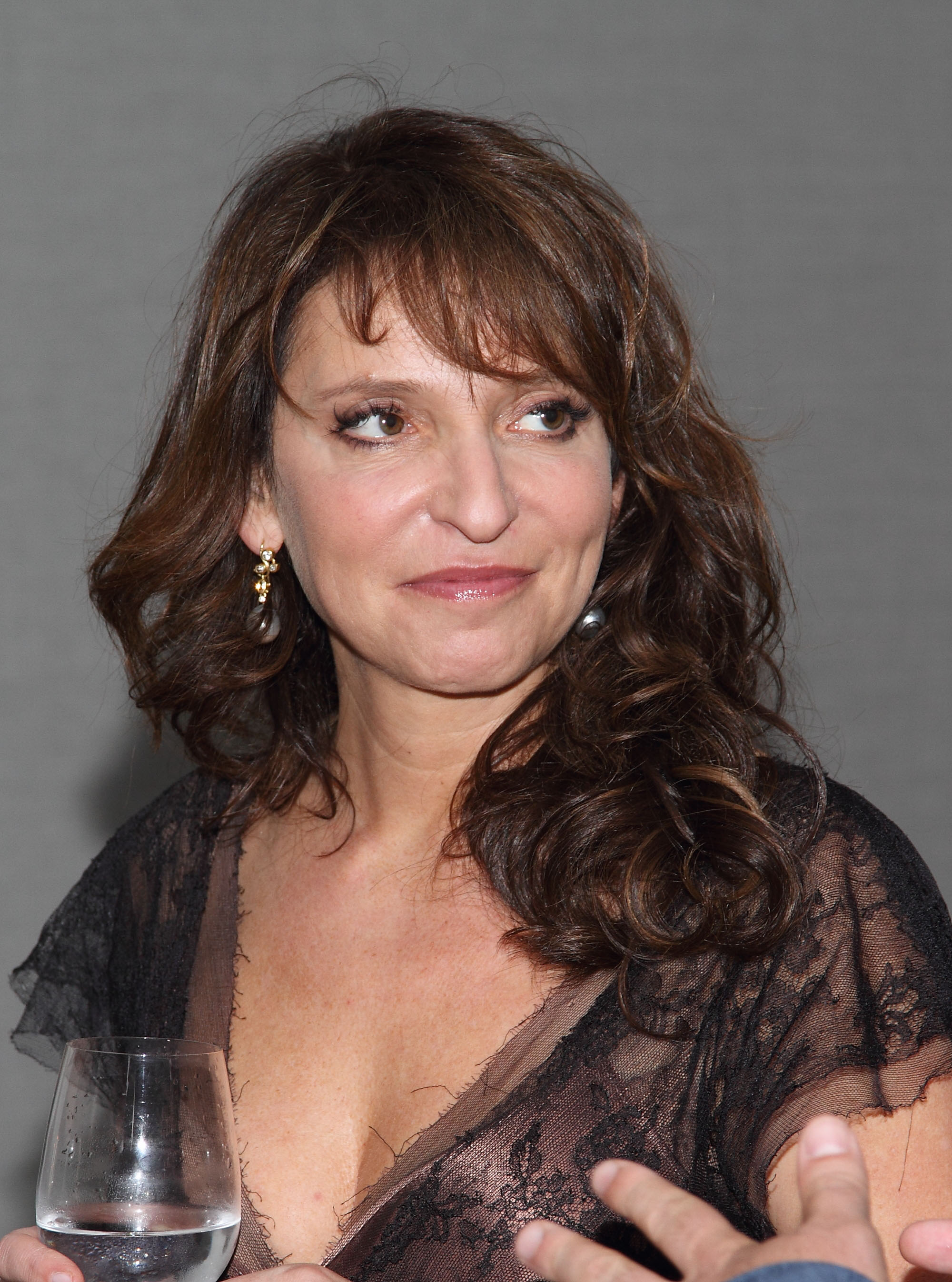
Susanne Bier, Best Foreign Language Film winner

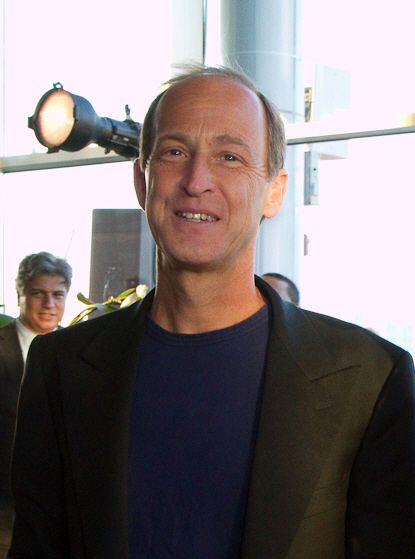
Charles Ferguson, Best Documentary Feature co-winner

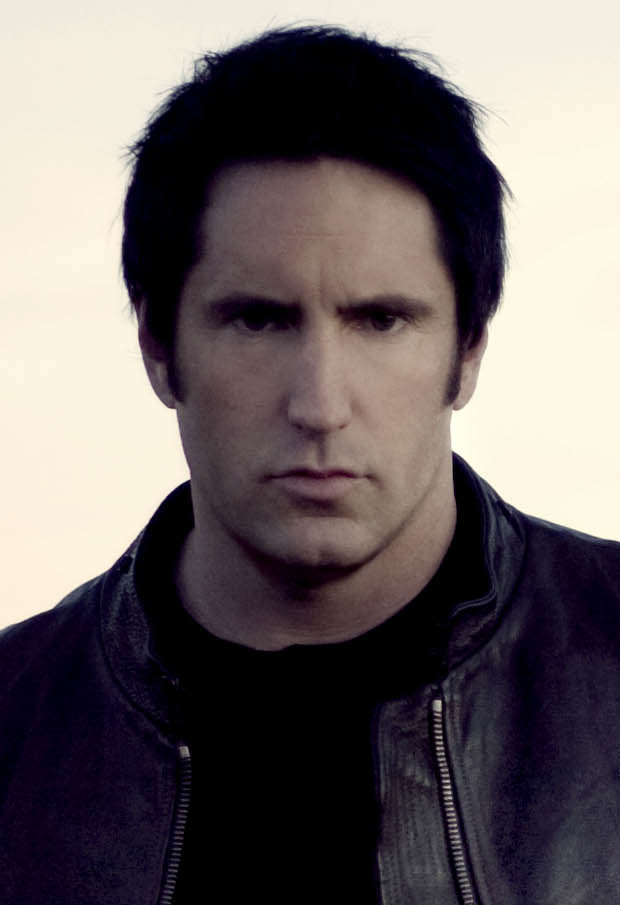
Trent Reznor, Best Original Score co-winner

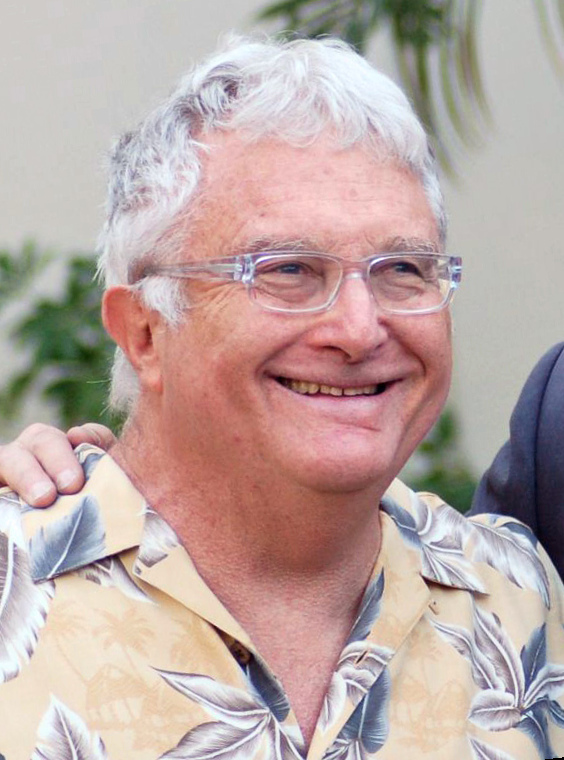
Randy Newman, Best Original Song winner

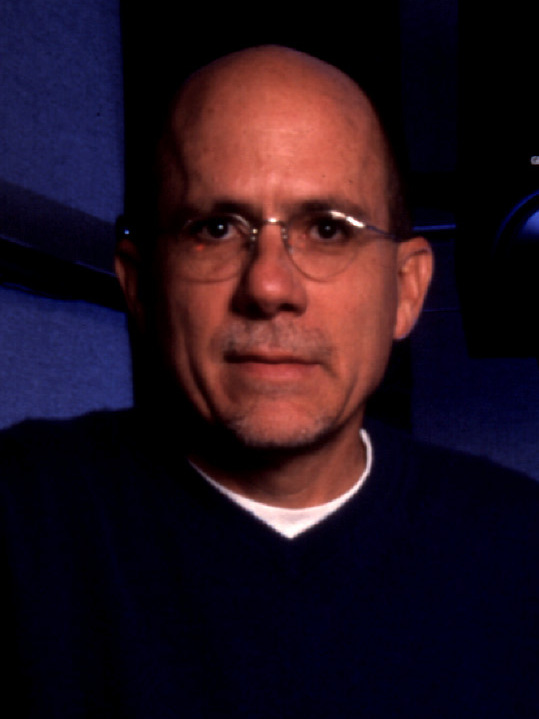
Richard King, Best Sound Editing winner

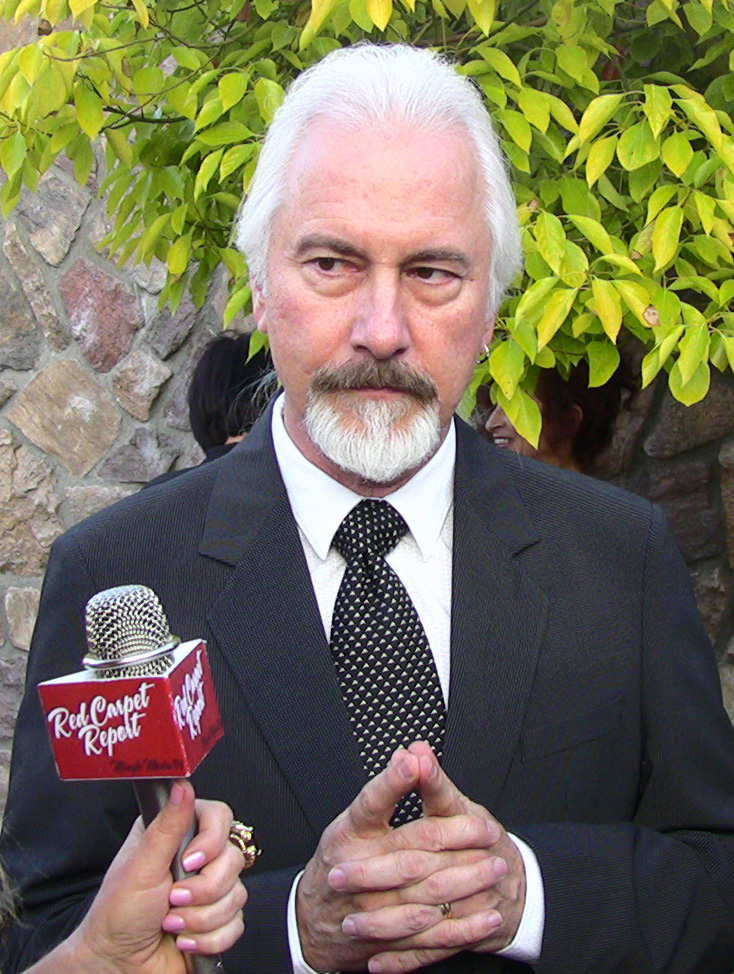
Rick Baker, Best Makeup co-winner

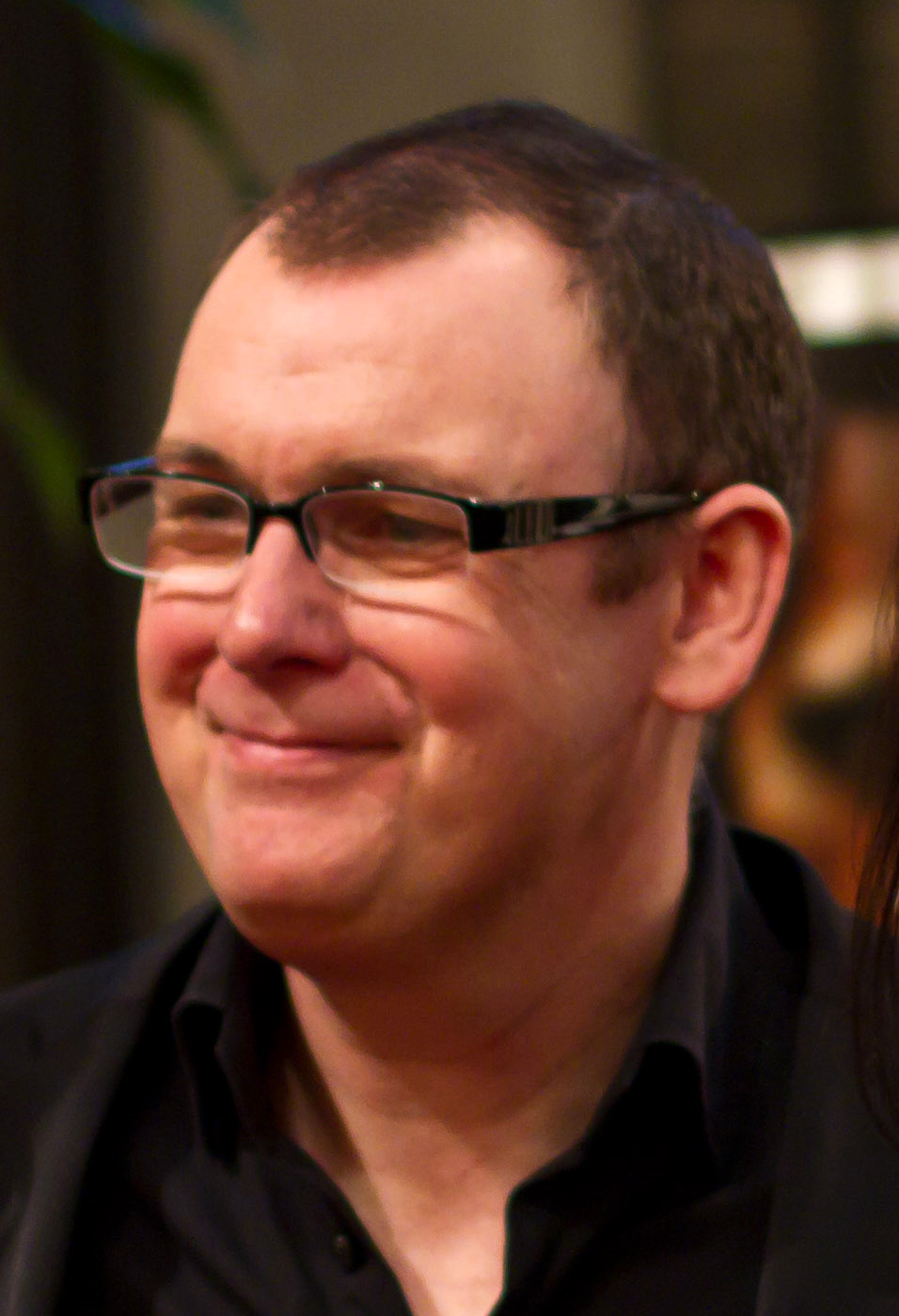
Dave Elsey, Best Makeup co-winner

Winners are listed first, highlighted in boldface, and indicated with a double-dagger (‡).

**Best Picture**: **The King's Speech – Iain Canning, Emile Sherman and Gareth Unwin, producers**‡; 127 Hours – Christian Colson, Danny Boyle and John Smithson, producers; Black Swan – Mike Medavoy, Brian Oliver and Scott Franklin, producers; The Fighter – David Hoberman, Todd Lieberman and Mark Wahlberg, producers; Inception – Emma Thomas and Christopher Nolan, producers; The Kids Are All Right – Gary Gilbert, Jeffrey Levy-Hinte and Celine Rattray, producers; The Social Network – Scott Rudin, Dana Brunetti, Michael De Luca and Ceán Chaffin, producers; Toy Story 3 – Darla K. Anderson, producer; True Grit – Scott Rudin, Ethan Coen and Joel Coen, producers; Winter's Bone – Anne Rosellini and Alix Madigan-Yorkin, producers	**Best Directing**: **Tom Hooper – The King's Speech**‡; Darren Aronofsky – Black Swan; David O. Russell – The Fighter; David Fincher – The Social Network; Joel Coen and Ethan Coen – True Grit
**Best Actor in a Leading Role**: **Colin Firth – The King's Speech as King George VI**‡; Javier Bardem – Biutiful as Uxbal; Jeff Bridges – True Grit as Rooster Cogburn; Jesse Eisenberg – The Social Network as Mark Zuckerberg; James Franco – 127 Hours as Aron Ralston	**Best Actress in a Leading Role**: **Natalie Portman – Black Swan as Nina Sayers**‡; Annette Bening – The Kids Are All Right as Dr. Nicole "Nic" Allgood; Nicole Kidman – Rabbit Hole as Becca Corbett; Jennifer Lawrence – Winter's Bone as Ree Dolly; Michelle Williams – Blue Valentine as Cynthia "Cindy" Heller
**Best Actor in a Supporting Role**: **Christian Bale – The Fighter as Dicky Eklund**‡; John Hawkes – Winter's Bone as Teardrop Dolly; Jeremy Renner – The Town as James "Jem" Coughlin; Mark Ruffalo – The Kids Are All Right as Paul Hatfield; Geoffrey Rush – The King's Speech as Lionel Logue	**Best Actress in a Supporting Role**: **Melissa Leo – The Fighter as Alice Eklund-Ward**‡; Amy Adams – The Fighter as Charlene Fleming; Helena Bonham Carter – The King's Speech as Queen Elizabeth; Hailee Steinfeld – True Grit as Mattalyn "Mattie" Ross; Jacki Weaver – Animal Kingdom as Janine "Smurf" Cody
**Best Writing (Original Screenplay)**: **The King's Speech – David Seidler**‡; Another Year – Mike Leigh; The Fighter – Screenplay by Scott Silver, Paul Tamasy and Eric Johnson; Story by Keith Dorrington, Paul Tamasy and Eric Johnson; Inception – Christopher Nolan; The Kids Are All Right – Lisa Cholodenko and Stuart Blumberg	**Best Writing (Adapted Screenplay)**: **The Social Network – Aaron Sorkin; based on the book The Accidental Billionaires by Ben Mezrich**‡; 127 Hours – Danny Boyle and Simon Beaufoy; based on the book Between a Rock and a Hard Place by Aron Ralston; Toy Story 3 – Screenplay by Michael Arndt; Story by John Lasseter, Andrew Stanton and Lee Unkrich; based on the previous films Toy Story and Toy Story 2; True Grit – Joel Coen and Ethan Coen; based on the novel by Charles Portis; Winter's Bone – Debra Granik and Anne Rosellini; based on the novel by Daniel Woodrell
**Best Animated Feature Film**: **Toy Story 3 – Directed by Lee Unkrich**‡; How to Train Your Dragon – Directed by Chris Sanders and Dean DeBlois; The Illusionist – Directed by Sylvain Chomet	**Best Foreign Language Film**: **In a Better World (Denmark) in Danish – Susanne Bier**‡; Biutiful (Mexico) in Spanish – Alejandro González Iñárritu; Dogtooth (Greece) in Greek – Yorgos Lanthimos; Incendies (Canada) in French – Denis Villeneuve; Outside the Law (Algeria) in Arabic – Rachid Bouchareb
**Best Documentary (Feature)**: **Inside Job – Charles Ferguson and Audrey Marrs**‡; Exit Through the Gift Shop – Banksy and Jaimie D'Cruz; Gasland – Josh Fox and Trish Adlesic; Restrepo – Tim Hetherington and Sebastian Junger; Waste Land – Lucy Walker and Angus Aynsley	**Best Documentary (Short Subject)**: **Strangers No More – Karen Goodman and Kirk Simon**‡; Killing in the Name – Jed Rothstein; Poster Girl – Sara Nesson and Mitchell W. Block; Sun Come Up – Jennifer Redfearn and Tim Metzger; The Warriors of Qiugang – Ruby Yang and Thomas Lennon
**Best Short Film (Live Action)**: **God of Love – Luke Matheny**‡; The Confession – Tanel Toom; The Crush – Michael Creagh; Na Wewe – Ivan Goldschmidt; Wish 143 – Ian Barnes and Samantha Waite	**Best Short Film (Animated)**: **The Lost Thing – Shaun Tan and Andrew Ruhemann**‡; Day & Night – Teddy Newton; The Gruffalo – Jakob Schuh and Max Lang; Let's Pollute – Geefwee Boedoe; Madagascar, a Journey Diary – Bastien Dubois
**Best Music (Original Score)**: **The Social Network – Trent Reznor and Atticus Ross**‡; 127 Hours – A. R. Rahman; How to Train Your Dragon – John Powell; Inception – Hans Zimmer; The King's Speech – Alexandre Desplat	**Best Music (Original Song)**: **"We Belong Together" from Toy Story 3 – Music and Lyrics by Randy Newman**‡; "Coming Home" from Country Strong – Music and Lyrics by Tom Douglas, Troy Verges and Hillary Lindsey; "I See the Light" from Tangled – Music by Alan Menken; Lyrics by Glenn Slater; "If I Rise" from 127 Hours – Music by A. R. Rahman; Lyrics by Dido and Rollo Armstrong
**Best Sound Editing**: **Inception – Richard King**‡; Toy Story 3 – Tom Myers and Michael Silvers; Tron: Legacy – Gwendolyn Yates Whittle and Addison Teague; True Grit – Skip Lievsay and Craig Berkey; Unstoppable – Mark P. Stoeckinger	**Best Sound Mixing**: **Inception – Lora Hirschberg, Gary A. Rizzo and Ed Novick**‡; The King's Speech – Paul Hamblin, Martin Jensen and John Midgley; Salt – Jeffrey J. Haboush, Greg P. Russell, Scott Millan and William Sarokin; The Social Network – Ren Klyce, David Parker, Michael Semanick and Mark Weingarten; True Grit – Skip Lievsay, Craig Berkey, Greg Orloff and Peter Kurland
**Best Art Direction**: **Alice in Wonderland – Art Direction: Robert Stromberg; Set Decoration: Karen O'Hara**‡; Harry Potter and the Deathly Hallows – Part 1 – Art Direction: Stuart Craig; Set Decoration: Stephenie McMillan; Inception – Art Direction: Guy Hendrix Dyas; Set Decoration: Larry Dias and Doug Mowat; The King's Speech – Art Direction: Eve Stewart; Set Decoration: Judy Farr; True Grit – Art Direction: Jess Gonchor; Set Decoration: Nancy Haigh	**Best Cinematography**: **Inception – Wally Pfister**‡; Black Swan – Matthew Libatique; The King's Speech – Danny Cohen; The Social Network – Jeff Cronenweth; True Grit – Roger Deakins
**Best Makeup**: **The Wolfman – Rick Baker and Dave Elsey**‡; Barney's Version – Adrien Morot; The Way Back – Edouard F. Henriques, Gregory Funk and Yolanda Toussieng	**Best Costume Design**: **Alice in Wonderland – Colleen Atwood**‡; I Am Love – Antonella Cannarozzi; The King's Speech – Jenny Beavan; The Tempest – Sandy Powell; True Grit – Mary Zophres
**Best Film Editing**: **The Social Network – Angus Wall and Kirk Baxter**‡; 127 Hours – Jon Harris; Black Swan – Andrew Weisblum; The Fighter – Pamela Martin; The King's Speech – Tariq Anwar	**Best Visual Effects**: **Inception – Paul Franklin, Chris Corbould, Andrew Lockley and Peter Bebb**‡; Alice in Wonderland – Ken Ralston, David Schaub, Carey Villegas and Sean Phillips; Harry Potter and the Deathly Hallows – Part 1 – Tim Burke, John Richardson, Christian Manz and Nicolas Aithadi; Hereafter – Michael Owens, Bryan Grill, Stephan Trojansky and Joe Farrell; Iron Man 2 – Janek Sirrs, Ben Snow, Ged Wright and Dan Sudick

=== Governors Awards ===
The Academy held its Second Annual Governors Awards ceremony on November 13, 2010, during which the following awards were presented:

==== Honorary Awards ====
- To Kevin Brownlow for the wise and devoted chronicling of the cinematic parade.
- To Jean-Luc Godard for passion. For confrontation. For a new kind of cinema.
- To Eli Wallach for a lifetime's worth of indelible screen characters.

==== Irving G. Thalberg Memorial Award ====
- Francis Ford Coppola

=== Films with multiple nominations and awards ===
The following 14 films received multiple nominations:

Nominations	Film
12	The King's Speech
10	True Grit
8	Inception
8	The Social Network
7	The Fighter
6	127 Hours
5	Black Swan
5	Toy Story 3
4	The Kids Are All Right
4	Winter's Bone
3	Alice in Wonderland
2	Biutiful
2	Harry Potter and the Deathly Hallows – Part 1
2	How to Train Your Dragon

The following six films received multiple awards:

Awards	Film
4	Inception
4	The King's Speech
3	The Social Network
2	Alice in Wonderland
2	The Fighter
2	Toy Story 3

== Presenters and performers ==
The following individuals presented awards or performed musical numbers.

=== Presenters ===
Name(s)	Role
Tom Kane	Announcer for the 83rd Academy Awards
Tom Hanks	Presenter of the awards for Best Art Direction and Best Cinematography
Kirk Douglas	Presenter of the award for Best Supporting Actress
Mila Kunis; Justin Timberlake	Presenters of the awards for Best Animated Short Film and Best Animated Feature Film
Javier Bardem; Josh Brolin	Presenters of the awards for Best Adapted Screenplay and Best Original Screenplay
Russell Brand; Helen Mirren	Presenters of the award for Best Foreign Language Film
Reese Witherspoon	Presenter of the award for Best Supporting Actor
Tom Sherak (AMPAS President); Anne Sweeney (Disney–ABC Television Group President)	Presenters of a special presentation acknowledging the renewal of a television distribution contract between ABC and AMPAS
Hugh Jackman; Nicole Kidman	Introducers of a medley of past film scores and presenters of the award for Best Original Score
Scarlett Johansson; Matthew McConaughey	Presenters of the awards for Best Sound Mixing and Best Sound Editing
Marisa Tomei	Presenter of the Academy Awards for Technical Achievement
Cate Blanchett	Presenter of the awards for Best Makeup and Best Costume Design
Kevin Spacey	Introducer of the performance of Best Original Song nominees "We Belong Together" and "I See the Light"
Amy Adams; Jake Gyllenhaal	Presenters of the awards for Best Documentary (Short Subject) and Best Live Action Short Film
Oprah Winfrey	Presenter of the award for Best Documentary Feature
Billy Crystal	Introducer of a digital projection of previous host Bob Hope at the 25th Academy Awards
Bob Hope (archive footage/digital projection)	Introducer of presenters Robert Downey Jr. and Jude Law
Robert Downey Jr. Jude Law	Presenters of the awards for Best Visual Effects and Best Film Editing
Jennifer Hudson	Introducer of the performance of Best Original Song nominees "If I Rise" and "Coming Home" and presenter of the award for Best Original Song
Halle Berry	Presenter of the Lena Horne tribute
Kathryn Bigelow; Hilary Swank	Presenters of the award for Best Director
Annette Bening	Presenter of the Academy Honorary Awards and the Irving G. Thalberg Memorial Award
Jeff Bridges	Presenter of the award for Best Actress
Sandra Bullock	Presenter of the award for Best Actor
Steven Spielberg	Presenter of the award for Best Picture

=== Performers ===
Name(s)	Role	Performed
William Ross	Musical arranger and conductor	Orchestral
Anne Hathaway	Performer	"On My Own" from Les Misérables
Randy Newman	Performer	"We Belong Together'" from Toy Story 3
Zachary Levi; Alan Menken; Mandy Moore	Performers	"I See the Light" from Tangled
A. R. Rahman; Florence Welch	Performers	"If I Rise" from 127 Hours
Gwyneth Paltrow	Performer	"Coming Home" from Country Strong
Celine Dion	Performer	"Smile" during the annual "In Memoriam" tribute
PS22 Chorus	Performers	"Over the Rainbow" from The Wizard of Oz during the closing segment

== Ceremony information ==
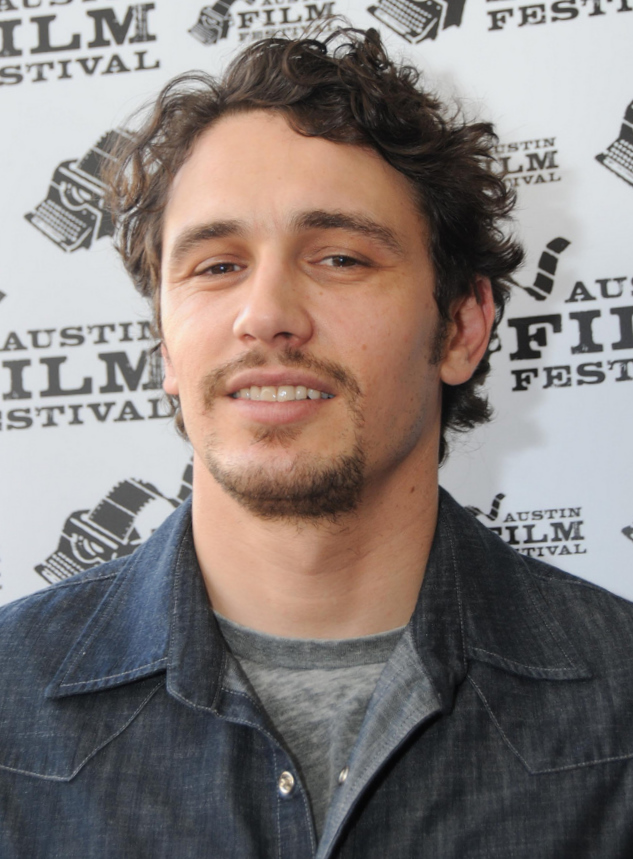
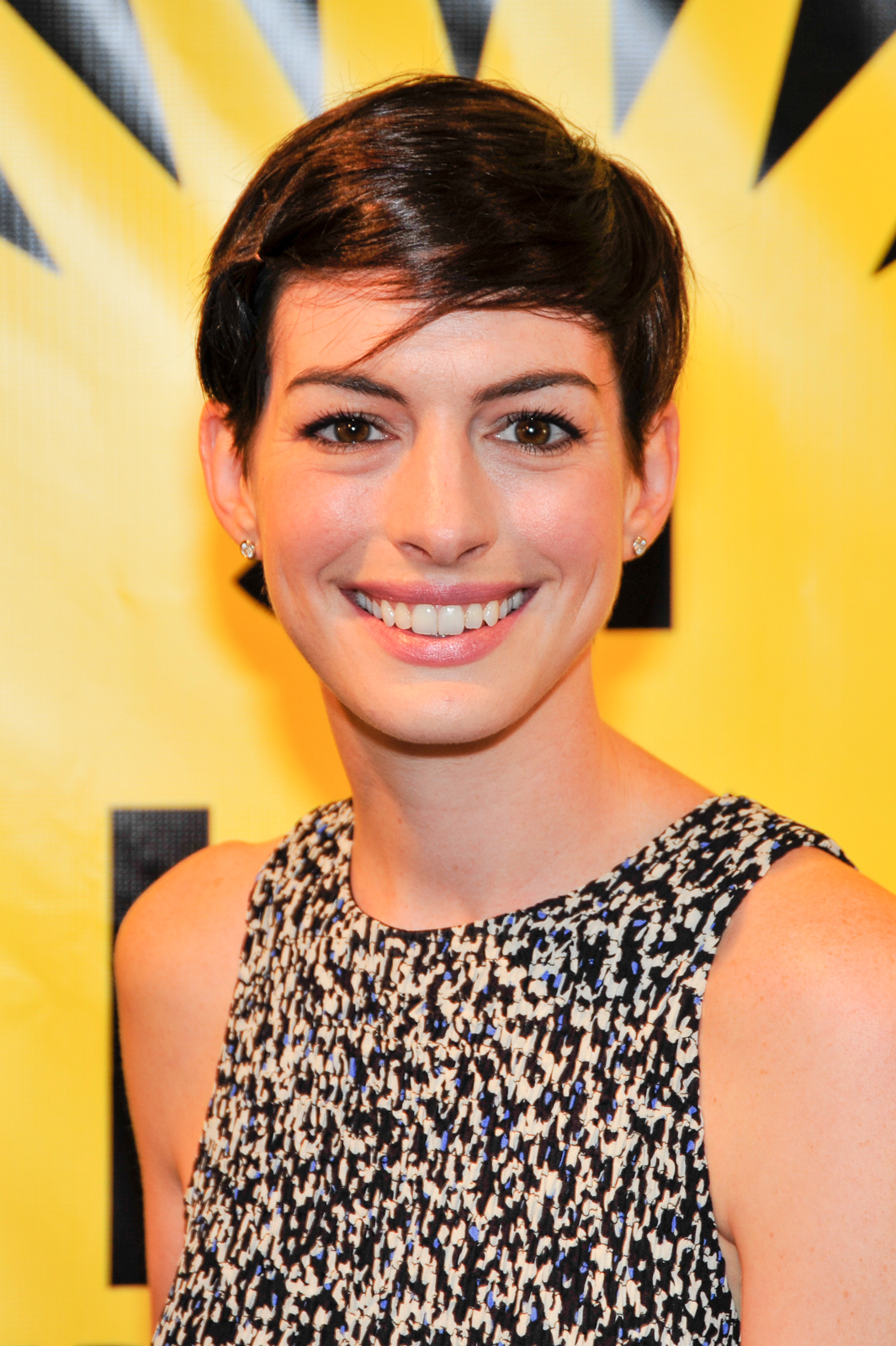
James Franco (left) and Anne Hathaway (right) co-hosted the 83rd Academy Awards

In June 2010, the AMPAS hired Oscar-winning producer Bruce Cohen and veteran television producer Don Mischer to oversee production of the telecast. "I'm absolutely ecstatic that Bruce and Don have accepted my invitation to produce and direct the 83rd Academy Awards telecast," remarked Academy president Tom Sherak. "Their work in producing the Academy's inaugural Governors Awards was exceptional and I am confident they will bring their creative vision and extraordinary talent to produce/direct a most memorable Oscar show." Although the prior ceremony hosted by Alec Baldwin and Steve Martin had the highest ratings in five years, their combined age was 116 years and the producers wanted to focus on a younger demographic. The unofficial first choice was Justin Timberlake but he declined, feeling it was at least a year too early for him.

Opting for younger faces for the ceremony, Cohen and Mischer hired actor James Franco and actress Anne Hathaway as co-hosts of the 2011 ceremony. "James Franco and Anne Hathaway personify the next generation of Hollywood icons — fresh, exciting and multi-talented. We hope to create an Oscar broadcast that will both showcase their incredible talents and entertain the world on February 27," said Cohen and Mischer regarding their selections to host the gala. "We are completely thrilled that James and Anne will be joining forces with our brilliant creative team to do just that." Franco and Hathaway became the first male-female duo to co-host the awards show since comedian Jerry Lewis and actress Celeste Holm presided over the 29th ceremony in 1957. At age 28, Hathaway was also the youngest person to host an Oscar ceremony.

Furthermore, AMPAS announced that this year's ceremony was "the most interactive awards show in history". The Academy revamped their official website oscar.com to include lists of all the nominees and winners, as well as film trailers and exclusive video content produced by both AMPAS and Oscar telecaster ABC. Also, via the Academy's Twitter and Facebook pages, people could post questions for any actor or celebrity attending the festivities to answer. One of the four Oscar pre-show co-hosts would then pose selected questions to both nominees and attendees alike. For a fee of US$4.99, users had online access to two dozen video streams that would take them from the red carpet, through the ceremony and on to the post-telecast Governors Ball. Several of the cameras utilized 360-degree views that viewers could direct.

Several other people participated in the production of the ceremony. For a younger writer, Franco consulted Judd Apatow, who suggested Jordan Rubin who brought in Megan Amram. William Ross served as musical director and conductor for the ceremony. Production designer Steve Bass built a new stage design for the ceremony. Entertainment Weekly columnist and TV personality Dave Karger greeted guests entering the red carpet. Designer Marc Friedland designed a new envelope heralding the winner of each category made from a high-gloss iridescent metallic gold paper stock, with red-lacquered lining that featured the Oscar statuette stamped in satin gold leaf. During the run-up to the ceremony, television personality Chris Harrison hosted "Road to the Oscars", a weekly behind-the-scenes video blog. Ben Mankiewicz hosted the official ABC pre-show, giving professional betting odds for the winners. PS22 Chorus children's choir performed "Over the Rainbow" from The Wizard of Oz at the end of the ceremony.

According to Rubin, Hathaway was heavily involved during the month of preparation. Franco on the other hand was busy shooting movies, while teaching a class and getting both his masters and his PhD. When filming started, Hathaway was focused and determined while Franco was more laid back, causing friction. In the closing weeks, Franco went back to Apatow who hired four additional writers; in response, Hathaway brought in Liz Feldman. This resulted in last-minute scrambling. According to Amram, "[a] lot of stuff that made it into the show was written a few days beforehand." Franco immediately left after the show ended, catching a flight to make a morning seminar on medieval manuscripts at Yale.

=== Box office performance of nominated films ===
For the second consecutive year, the field of major nominees included at least one blockbuster at the American and Canadian box offices. However, only three of the nominees had grossed over $100 million before the nominations were announced, compared with five from the previous year. The combined gross of the ten Best Picture nominees when the Oscars were announced was $1.2 billion, the second-highest ever behind 2009. The average gross was $119.3 million.

Two of the ten Best Picture nominees were among the top ten releases in box office during the nominations. At the time of the announcement of nominations on January 25, Toy Story 3 was the highest-grossing film among the Best Picture nominees with $414.9 million in domestic box office receipts. The only other top ten box office hit to receive a nomination was Inception which earned $292.5 million. Among the remaining eight nominees, True Grit was the next-highest-grossing film with $137.9 million followed by The Social Network ($95.4 million), Black Swan ($83.2 million), The Fighter ($72.6 million), The King's Speech ($57.3 million), The Kids Are All Right ($20.8 million), 127 Hours ($11.2 million), and finally Winter's Bone ($6.2 million).

Of the top 50 grossing movies of the year, 55 nominations went to 15 films on the list. Only Toy Story 3 (1st), Inception (5th), How to Train Your Dragon (9th), True Grit (17th), The Social Network (29th), The Town (32nd), Black Swan (38th), and The Fighter (45th) were nominated for directing, acting, screenwriting, Best Picture or Animated Feature. The other top-50 box office hits that earned nominations were Alice in Wonderland (2nd), Iron Man 2 (3rd), Harry Potter and the Deathly Hallows — Part 1 (6th), Tangled (10th), Tron: Legacy (12th), Salt (21st), and Unstoppable (39th).

=== Critical reviews ===
The show received a negative reception from most media publications. According to writer Bruce Vilanch, the crowd enjoyed the starting short film, but when Franco and Hathaway came on stage, it shifted. According to Rubin, Hathaway "was embracing their arrival on stage" while Franco was filming the crowd on his phone. Mara Reinstein of The Ringer said there was no single moment of failure but described the broadcast as "death by a thousand paper cuts."

Film critic Roger Ebert said, "Despite the many worthy nominated films, the Oscarcast was painfully dull, slow, witless, and hosted by the ill-matched James Franco and Anne Hathaway. She might have made a delightful foil for another partner, but Franco had a deer-in-the-headlights manner and read his lines robotically." He went on to praise the winners of the night, but he ended his review with the words, "Dead. In. The. Water." Writer David Wild called it "the world's most uncomfortable blind date between the cool rocker stoner kid and the adorable theater camp cheerleader."

Television critic Tim Goodman of The Hollywood Reporter commented, "In what could go down as one of the worst Oscar telecasts in history, a bad and risky idea — letting two actors host — played out in spectacularly unwatchable fashion on the biggest of all nights for the film world." He also added, "These Oscars were a bore-fest that seemed to drag on relentlessly but listlessly." Gail Pennington of the St. Louis Post-Dispatch wrote that the ceremony "felt a little like a bad night on Saturday Night Live — awkward, slow and not particularly entertaining." Regarding the hosts, she quipped that Hathaway "at least tried", but she remarked, "Franco seemed half asleep, or possibly stoned."

Some media outlets received the broadcast more positively. Entertainment Weekly television critic Ken Tucker stated that the show was "Funny, poised, relaxed, and smart, Anne Hathaway and James Franco made for marvelous Oscar hosts. Their combination of respect and informality struck the right tone for the night, a happily surprising production that had its share of fine moments both planned and ad-libbed." On the overall aspect of the ceremony, they concluded "all in all, it was a fun, briskly paced night."

Mary McNamara from the Los Angeles Times commented, "The two seemed to be following the directive to "first do no harm," as if they knew they couldn't score as big as Jimmy Fallon did with the Emmy Awards, but were determined to avoid becoming morning show fodder like Ricky Gervais was after this year's Golden Globes. The result was a show that moved along, with a few draggy bits and high notes, like precisely what it was: a very long and fancy awards show." Her review further said "Overall, the evening had an oddly business-like feel, a mind-numbing evenness that was exacerbated by the relentless predictability of the winners, and the fact that none of the acting winners were played off no matter how long their "thank-yous" went."

=== Ratings and reception ===
The American telecast on ABC drew in an average of 37.9 million people over its length, which was a 9% decrease from the previous year's ceremony. An estimated 71.3 million total viewers watched all or part of the awards. The show also drew lower Nielsen ratings compared to the two previous ceremonies, with 21.2% of households watching over a 33 share. In addition, the program scored an 11.8 rating over a 30 share among the 18–49 demographic, which was a 12 percent decrease over last year's demographic numbers.

== "In Memoriam" ==
The "In Memoriam" tribute, which featured Celine Dion performing the Charlie Chaplin song "Smile", paid tribute to the following individuals.

- John Barry – Composer
- Grant McCune – Visual effects
- Tony Curtis – Actor
- Edward Limato – Agent
- Tom Mankiewicz – Writer
- Gloria Stuart – Actress
- William Fraker – Cinematographer
- Joseph Strick – Director
- Lionel Jeffries – Actor
- Sally Menke – Editor
- Ronni Chasen – Publicist
- Leslie Nielsen – Actor
- Robert Radnitz – Producer
- Claude Chabrol – Director
- Pete Postlethwaite – Actor
- Bill Littlejohn – Animator
- Pierre Guffroy – Art director
- Patricia Neal – Actress
- George Hickenlooper – Director
- Irving Ravetch – Writer
- Robert Culp – Actor
- Bob Boyle – Art director
- Mario Monicelli – Director
- Lynn Redgrave – Actress
- Elliott Kastner – Producer
- Dede Allen – Editor
- Peter Yates – Producer, director
- Anne Francis – Actress
- Arthur Penn – Producer, director
- Theoni Aldredge – Costume designer
- Susannah York – Actress
- Ronald Neame – Director
- David Wolper – Producer
- Jill Clayburgh – Actress
- Alan Hume – Cinematographer
- Irvin Kershner – Director
- Dennis Hopper – Actor
- Dino De Laurentiis – Producer
- Blake Edwards – Writer, director
- Kevin McCarthy – Actor
- Lena Horne – Singer, actress

At the end of the montage, Halle Berry paid special tribute to Horne and introduced a film clip of her singing the titular song from the film Stormy Weather.

== See also ==
- 17th Screen Actors Guild Awards
- 31st Golden Raspberry Awards
- 31st Brit Awards
- 53rd Annual Grammy Awards
- 63rd Primetime Emmy Awards
- 64th British Academy Film Awards
- 35th Laurence Olivier Awards
- 65th Tony Awards
- 68th Golden Globe Awards
- List of submissions to the 83rd Academy Awards for Best Foreign Language Film
