= Salt (2010 film) =

2010 film by Phillip Noyce

- Theatrical release poster
- Directed by: Phillip Noyce
- Written by: Kurt Wimmer
- Produced by: Lorenzo di Bonaventura; Sunil Perkash
- Starring: Angelina Jolie; Liev Schreiber; Chiwetel Ejiofor; Andre Braugher
- Cinematography: Robert Elswit
- Edited by: Stuart Baird; John Gilroy
- Music by: James Newton Howard
- Production companies: Columbia Pictures; Di Bonaventura Pictures; Relativity Media
- Distributed by: Sony Pictures Releasing
- Release dates: July 19, 2010 (Hollywood); July 23, 2010 (United States)
- Running time: 100 minutes
- Country: United States
- Language: English
- Budget: $110–130 million
- Box office: $293.5 million

Salt is a 2010 American spy action thriller film directed by Phillip Noyce and written by Kurt Wimmer. It stars Angelina Jolie, Liev Schreiber, Daniel Olbrychski, August Diehl, and Chiwetel Ejiofor. Jolie plays CIA operative Evelyn Salt, who is accused of being a Russian sleeper agent and goes on the run to try to clear her name.

Originally written with a male protagonist, with Tom Cruise initially secured for the lead, the script was ultimately rewritten by Brian Helgeland for Jolie. Filming took place on location in Washington, D.C., New York City, and Albany, New York, between March and June 2009, with reshoots in January 2010. Action scenes were primarily performed with practical stunts, computer-generated imagery being used mostly for creating digital environments.

The film had a panel at San Diego Comic-Con on July 22 and was released in North America on July 23, 2010. Salt grossed $294 million at the worldwide box office and received generally positive reviews, with praise for the action scenes and Jolie's performance, but drawing criticism on the writing, with reviewers finding the plot implausible and convoluted. The DVD and Blu-ray discs were released on December 21, 2010, and featured two alternate cuts providing different endings for the film.

Salt was nominated for Best Sound Mixing at the 83rd Academy Awards.

== Plot ==
Evelyn Salt is in prison in North Korea, suspected of being a U.S. spy. The CIA arranges a prisoner exchange to stifle the publicity her boyfriend, arachnologist Mike Krause, is bringing to her case. He proposes marriage despite her admission that she is a CIA operative.

Two years later, Salt interrogates Russian defector Oleg Vasilyevich Orlov, with CIA colleague Ted Winter and counterintelligence officer Darryl Peabody observing. Orlov claims that on "Day X", Russian sleeper agents known as "KAs" will destroy the U.S., and that Agent "KA-12" will assassinate Russian President Boris Matveyev at the impending funeral of the U.S. vice president. He says KA-12's name is Evelyn Salt. Because of this, Peabody orders Salt to be detained, while Orlov kills two agents and escapes. She also escapes and tries to phone her husband Mike while traveling to their home and evading the pursuing CIA and police. Mike has been kidnapped. Salt gathers supplies including weapons and a spider in a jar.

Salt shoots Matveyev at the vice president's funeral and surrenders to Peabody instead of taking the opportunity to kill him. Matveyev is pronounced dead. Salt escapes to a barge where Orlov is waiting with other sleeper agents. In a flashback she recalls her childhood in the Soviet Union, being trained with other children and assuming the identity of the real Evelyn Salt, an American girl who died with her parents in a car crash in the Soviet Union.

Orlov tests Salt by reuniting her with Mike only to immediately have him killed in front of her. Her lack of reaction convinces him, so he says she and another KA will assassinate U.S. president Howard Lewis. Salt kills Orlov and the other agents and leaves to meet with the KA Shnaider in his cover as a Czech - NATO liaison officer.

Disguised as Shnaider's male attaché, Salt accompanies him into the White House, where Shnaider launches a suicide attack, driving the president into a secure underground bunker, accompanied by Winter and other agents. Salt manages to enter the outer bunker before it is sealed.

Russia mobilizes its nuclear arsenal in response to President Matveyev's assassination; U.S. president Lewis orders preparations for retaliation. Upon realizing Salt has entered the outer bunker, Winter kills everyone in the inner bunker except the president, revealing himself to be KA Nikolai Tarkovsky.

Incapacitating the president, Tarkovsky begins targeting missiles at Mecca and Tehran to incite a billion Muslims against the U.S. Salt professes admiration and nearly persuades him to let her join him in the inner bunker when a broadcast reports that President Matveyev is alive, his vital signs having been merely suppressed by spider venom.

Tarkovsky soon realizes Salt is not on his side and reveals that she is to be the patsy for the nuclear attacks. She breaks into the bunker and, after a fight, aborts the missile launch. Reinforcements arrive and Salt is arrested as Winter/Tarkovsky identifies himself as CIA.

As Salt is being led out in chains, Tarkovsky grabs a pair of scissors. As she is led past him, she throws her chain around his neck and jumps over the railing, killing him.

Alone with Peabody in a helicopter, Salt explains her actions to him, promising to hunt down the remaining KA agents if freed, pointing out that Matveyev is alive and that she had not shot him earlier. Salt's fingerprints are found on the barge, convincing Peabody, who allows her to jump from the helicopter into the Potomac River.

== Cast ==
- Angelina Jolie as Evelyn Salt, a CIA operative accused of being an agent for the KGB
- Liev Schreiber as Theodore "Ted" Winter / Nikolai Tarkovsky, head of the CIA's Russia House
- Chiwetel Ejiofor as Darryl Peabody, an ONCIX agent in pursuit of Salt
- Daniel Olbrychski as Oleg Vassily Orlov, the Russian defector and spymaster
  - Daniel Pearce as a younger Orlov in the flashbacks
- August Diehl as Mike Krause, Salt's husband
- Tika Sumpter as Front deskwoman
- Olek Krupa as Boris Matveyev, the president of Russia
- Hunt Block as Howard Lewis, the president of the United States
- Corey Stoll as Shnaider, the Russian suicide-bomber sent to his death by Orlov
- Andre Braugher as Secretary of Defense
- Gaius Charles as CIA officer
- Zoe Lister-Jones as CIA Security Hub tech
- Jeremy Davidson as President's Secret Service agent
- Jeb Brown as bunker technician
- Vitali Baganov as new Russian President
- Victoria Cartagena as Portico Checkpoint agent
- Kamar de los Reyes as Secret Service agent
- Victor Slezak as One-Star General
- Alex Garfin as the youngest Chenkov (uncredited)

== Production ==
=== Development and writing ===
The early development of the script began while Kurt Wimmer was doing interviews promoting Equilibrium. In a November 2002 interview, he discussed on which scripts he was working. He stated, "I have several scripts – foremost of which is one called The Far-Reaching Philosophy of Edwin A. Salt – kind of a high-action spy thriller..." In another interview, Wimmer described the project as "very much about me and my wife". The plot incorporated many elements from Equilibrium, with an oppressive and paranoid political system of brainwashing that gets overthrown by one of its high-ranking members, who rebels due to an emotional transformation. With the shortened title Edwin A. Salt, the script was sold to Columbia Pictures in January 2007. By July 2007, the script had attracted the attention of Tom Cruise.

Terry George was the first director to join the project, and he also did some revisions to the script, but he soon left the project. Peter Berg was the next director to consider, but he, too, eventually dropped out for undisclosed reasons. A year later, Phillip Noyce was confirmed to direct. Noyce was attracted to Salt for its espionage themes, which are present in most of his filmography, as well as the tension of a character who tries to prove his innocence, yet also does what he was previously accused of.

=== Casting ===
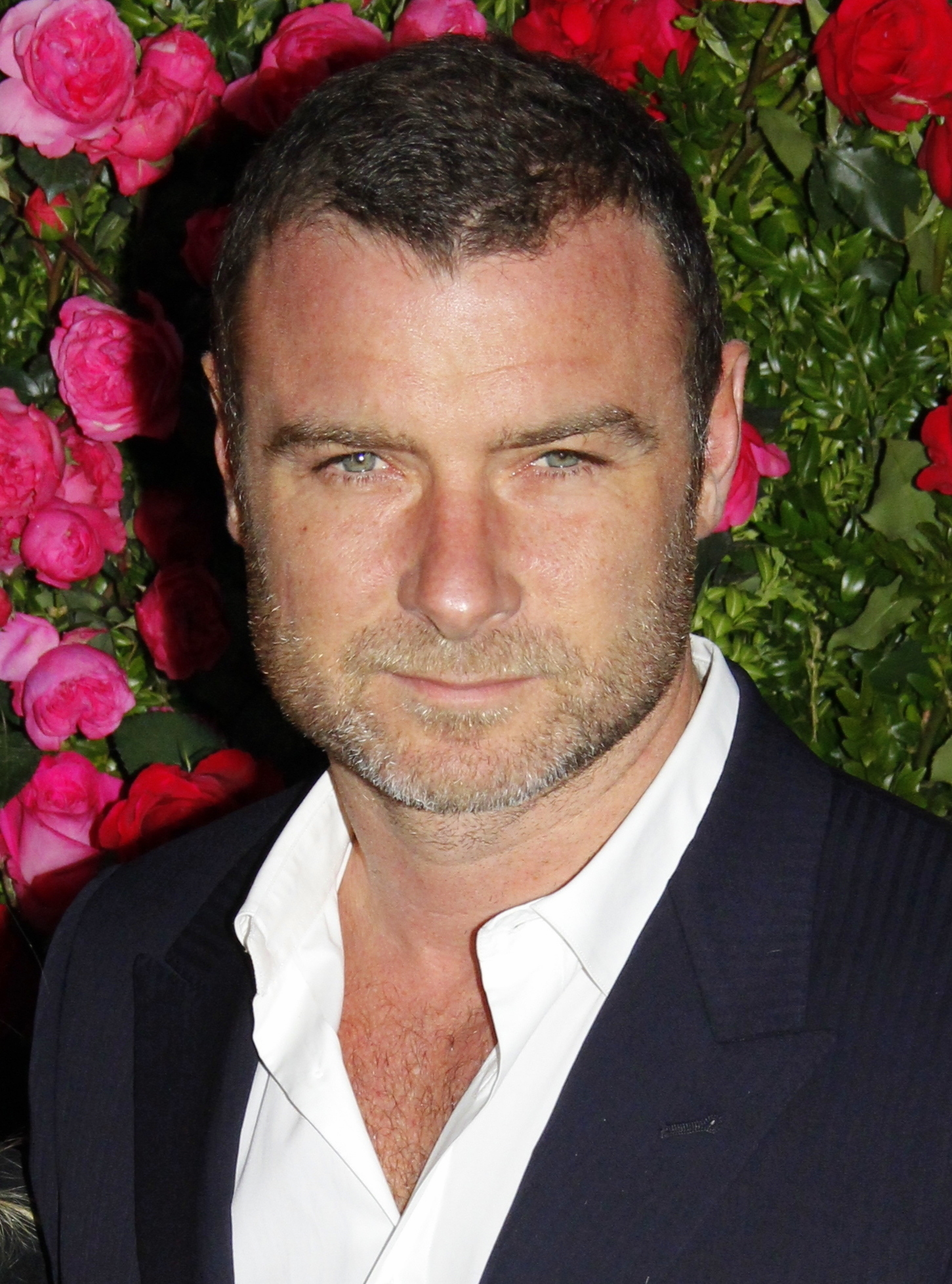
Schreiber was chosen for his "hidden emotionality" and his performance in Defiance.

Initial discussions took place in 2008 between Cruise and Noyce about Cruise playing Edwin A. Salt. These discussions were going on for more than a year between the pair and their representatives. Cruise decided he was unable to commit to the script because he feared that the character was too close to his Mission: Impossible character Ethan Hunt. Cruise decided to work on Knight and Day, instead. The filmmakers tried to differentiate the character from Hunt, but eventually came to accept they were too similar and decided not to change the characteristics of Salt. Noyce said, "But, you know, he had a valid point. It was kind of returning to an offshoot of a character that he'd already played. It's like playing the brother, or the cousin, of somebody that you played in another movie."

Columbia Pictures executive Amy Pascal suggested Angelina Jolie to Noyce, who had often spoken to Jolie in the past about a desire to create a female spy franchise. Pascal even invited Jolie for a Bond girl role, but the actress replied that she was more interested in playing James Bond herself, instead. Jolie was sent Salt's script in September 2008 and liked it. Wimmer, Noyce, and producer Lorenzo di Bonaventura went to visit Jolie at her home in France to discuss a possible script and character change. Writer Brian Helgeland helped with the character development and dialogue of the script based on the notes that came out of those discussions with Jolie and to accompany the gender change, the title character's name was changed to Evelyn Salt.

One of Jolie's requests was to rework the third act, which originally had Salt rescue his wife and son from a coalition of villains because she did not believe a mother would neglect her child in this kind of situation. Wimmer decided then to make Salt more crucial to the villain's schemes, and add a sequence where Salt breaks into "a place harder than Fort Knox" – after considering Camp David, Wimmer settled on the White House. When asked if the script written for Cruise was the same for Jolie, he said, "I think that it's just been a continual process, obviously accelerating by changing the central character, but the ideas, the locomotive of ideas that drive the film, are the same. An undercover CIA operative is accused of being a Russian mole, and has to go on the run to defend himself. That's been the same since day one. The tone of the film has changed in this evolution. In the same way, I guess, as – you know – action thrillers have changed along the lines of the Bond films and the Bourne films".

On February 19, 2009, Liev Schreiber was reported to play the role of Ted Winter, Evelyn Salt's friend and colleague in the CIA. Three days later, Chiwetel Ejiofor was named as CIA Officer Peabody, who is in pursuit of Salt. Noyce said Ejiofor, whom he first saw in Dirty Pretty Things, seemed to have the "intelligence and disarming sort of obsessiveness" that a counter-intelligence officer would need. August Diehl, who played Salt's husband Mike Krause, came after a recommendation from Jolie's partner Brad Pitt, who had worked with Diehl in Inglourious Basterds, and Daniel Olbrychski was chosen for Orlov because Andrei Konchalovsky told Noyce that such an evil Russian character could only be played by a Polish actor.

=== Filming ===
On a budget of $130 million, (Note: The film cost about $130 million to produce, and Sony said the final cost after tax credits was less than $110 million.) principal photography took place mostly on location in New York City and Washington, D.C. from March to June 2009. Noyce decided to avoid "typical postcard views of Washington, D.C." to reflect "the more day-to-day environment of massive federal buildings inhabited by the typical bureaucrat". The opening sequence in North Korea was shot at the Floyd Bennett Field, with an extra who had experience with prisoner exchanges acting as a consultant. Salt's rendezvous with Orlov was shot on the Frying Pan, a former lighthouse ship, now moored in the Hudson River, at 26th Street in New York. The outside of the KA training facility was the Makaryev Monastery in Russia, while the interior was the Russian Orthodox Cathedral of the Holy Virgin Protection in New York's East Village, where the funeral was also shot. Filming for a chase sequence took place on Water Street in Albany, New York, near the Interstate 787 ramp, between April and May. Studio production took place at Grumman Studios in Bethpage, New York. Steven Zaillian was brought for uncredited rewrites. Filming also took place on 157th St and Riverside Drive in the upper Manhattan neighborhood of Washington Heights. Some scenes were also filmed outside of Manhattan, including the Bronx, Queens, and Staten Island, and in Westchester County.

After Jolie had just given birth to twins, she spent time training before filming to get fit to perform almost all of the stunts herself. Bonaventura said, "She is so prepared and so ready and gung-ho, she'll do any stunt. We had her jumping out of helicopters, shooting, jumping off of all sorts of things and infiltrating places that are impossible to infiltrate". Salt's fighting style was described as a mixture of Muay Thai, Shaolin Kung-Fu, and Jeet Kune Do, which was considered by the stunt team the most suitable for Jolie's physique, and Krav Maga, for its rawness and aggressiveness. Noyce wanted to film the scene where Salt hangs from the edge of the building in a studio with chroma key, but Jolie insisted on doing it herself in the actual location. On May 29, 2009, filming was temporarily halted after Jolie suffered a minor head injury while filming an action scene. She was taken to a hospital as a precautionary measure and released on the same day with no serious injuries, allowing filming to resume. Salt's escape after being captured in St. Bartholomew's originally involved her jumping off a building into a window-cleaning machine, but budgetary constraints caused the scene to be changed into a car chase.

Computer-generated imagery (CGI) was used extensively throughout the film to create environments and elements, such as bullet holes and flames. More dangerous objects such as a taser or the handcuffs used to strangle Winter were also made from CGI. Five companies were responsible for visual effects. The two most involved were CIS Vancouver and Framestore. CIS Vancouver recreated the White House since the crew did not have permission to shoot in the building, and made a digital elevator shaft for the scene where Salt goes down into the White House bunker. Framestore was responsible for the assassination attempt on the Russian president, which combined actual shots of St. Bartholomew's Church, a digital recreation of the church's interior, and scenes with actor Olek Krupa falling down a collapsing floor.

Female CIA officers were consulted about the creation of disguises, leading to the scene where Salt undergoes subtle changes to disguise herself as a Czech. The "sweet and caring" blonde Salt dyeing her hair black would represent the shift to Chenkov, the menacing Russian agent. For the scene where Salt disguises herself as a major, pictures of Angelina Jolie were treated on Adobe Photoshop to create a believable male version, with the resulting image being used by the make-up team as an inspiration for the prosthetics.

The film's test screenings were poor. Sony brought in producer and slate co-financier Joseph M. Singer, former head of Universal's Motion Picture Group, to oversee a rewrite and reshoots. Jolie said he made the film "more comprehensible" to moviegoers. Singer was paid an exorbitant price at the time, $2 million, for two months of work. Subsequently, he praised Noyce and di Bonaventura, stating his contributions were minimal.

=== Versions ===
Director Phillip Noyce has said that, due to the extensive usage of flashbacks, "there was always going to be a mountain of alternative material that would not fit into the theatrical version". The film ended up having two extra versions, the director's cut, and the extended cut – which Noyce refers to in his audio commentary as the film's original cut – both included on the DVD and Blu-ray disc deluxe editions.

The director's cut was described by Noyce as "my own personal take on the material, free from the politics and restrictions of producers, studio, or censorship ratings". Four minutes of film were added, leading to a running time of 104 minutes. More flashbacks were added, and the violence was amped up, for example, Mike being drowned rather than shot to death. The ending is also different; in the bunker scene, Winter kills the president instead of only knocking him unconscious. Noyce has described the ending as “an ending, yet just a beginning—one that turns the entire story on its head.” This refers to the final scene, in which a newsreel voiceover announces that the newly elected President of the United States has officially declared Salt dead and is embarking on a peacekeeping mission to Moscow. The scene also mentions him laying flowers at the plane crash site that claimed the lives of his father, mother, and sister years earlier, suggesting that he himself may be one of the KA agents.

The extended cut increases the running time by only one minute, but rewrites the plot by removing, rearranging, and adding scenes.

== Soundtrack ==
Salt: Original Motion Picture Soundtrack was released on July 20, 2010, on iTunes and on August 10, 2010, as an on-demand CD-R from Amazon.com. The music was composed by James Newton Howard and released by Madison Gate Records. The song "Orlov's Story" includes a Russian lullaby that music editor Joe E. Rand found at Amoeba Music, and which served as inspiration for the choir heard in other tracks – but the chants in the rest of the score are only random syllables, as Rand and Howard thought actual Russian words would be a spoil about Salt's allegiance.

== Release ==
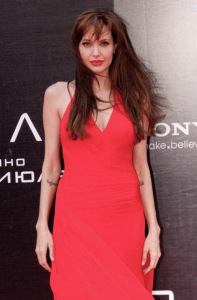
Jolie at the Moscow premiere of the film on July 25, 2010

The film's marketing campaign included a panel at San Diego Comic-Con on July 22, 2010, and an episodic advergame titled "Day X Exists", where players watched webisodes and performed missions to unveil the terrorist plot. It was released in the United States on July 23, 2010. It was released on August 18 in the United Kingdom, despite poster advertisements suggesting it would be released on August 20. The deluxe unrated-edition Blu-ray disc and DVD were released on December 21, 2010, by Sony Pictures Home Entertainment. It includes three versions of the film – the original theatrical film and two additional unrated extended cuts not seen in theaters with two alternate endings. A theatrical-edition DVD was also released. In the home video charts, Salt debuted at first in the rentals and third in sales.

== Reception ==
=== Box office ===
Salt grossed $118.3 million in the United States and Canada, and $175.2 million in other countries, for a worldwide total of $293.5 million.

Sony predicted an opening-weekend take in the low-$30 million range, while commentators thought it would come in closer to $40 million and possibly beat Inception for the number-one spot at the box office. Salt opened in 3,612 theaters, with a first-day gross of $12.5 million and an opening weekend total of $36.0 million, finishing behind Inception, which made $42.7 million in its second weekend. Salt also grossed $15 million from 19 international markets. in its second weekend, it declined in ticket sales by 45.9% making $19.5 million and placed number three behind Inception and Dinner for Schmucks. It was released in 29 countries that same weekend, and grossed $25.4 million.

=== Critical response ===
Salt received generally positive reviews from critics. Review aggregation website Rotten Tomatoes gives the film an approval rating of 62% based on 250 reviews, with an average rating of 6.00/10. The site's critical consensus reads: "Angelina Jolie gives it her all in the title role, and her seasoned performance is almost enough to save Salt from its predictable and ludicrous plot." Metacritic assigned the film a weighted average score of 65 out of 100 based on 42 critics, indicating "generally favorable reviews". Audiences polled by CinemaScore gave the film an average grade of "B+" on an A+ to F scale.

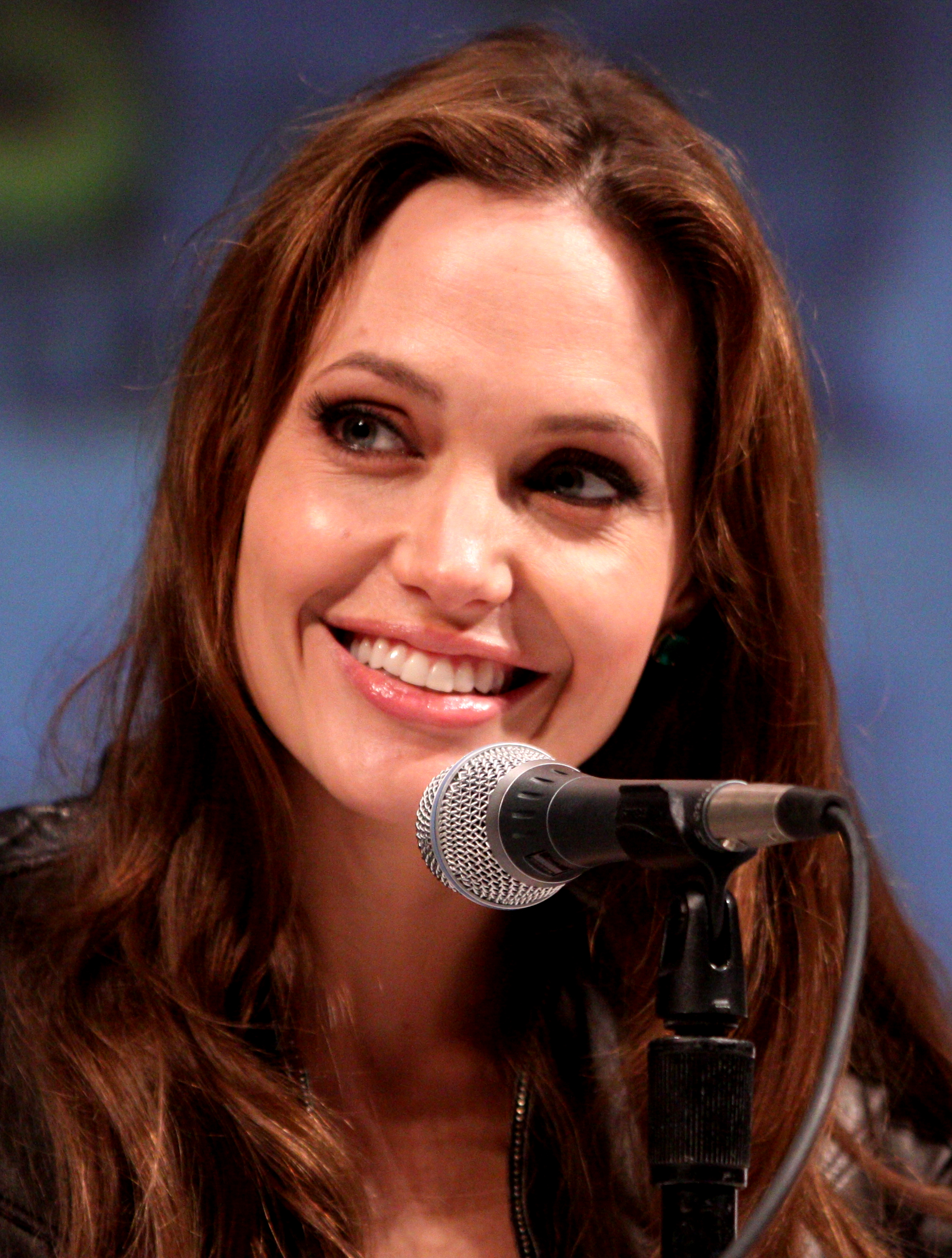
Jolie at San Diego Comic-Con in 2010 on the Salt panel. The actress' performance was considered one of the film's strong points.

Many reviewers highlighted the coincidence of Salt's release shortly after the revelation of real Russian sleeper agents in the Illegals Program, with some comparing Salt to one of the agents, Anna Chapman. Kirk Honeycutt of The Hollywood Reporter said that, "While preposterous at every turn, Salt is a better Bond movie than most recent Bond movies, as its makers keep the stunts real and severely limit CGI gimmickry". Justin Chang of Variety said Jolie was "in her element, submitting gamely to the mayhem and hitting crucial emotional notes with effective understatement", and called the film a "brisk, professionally assembled, but finally shrug-inducing thriller." Chicago Sun-Times critic Roger Ebert gave the film four stars (his maximum), saying "Salt is a damn fine thriller. ... It's gloriously absurd. This movie has holes in it big enough to drive the whole movie through. The laws of physics seem to be suspended here the same way as in a Road Runner cartoon."

Time magazine reviewer Richard Corliss praised the action scenes and Noyce's persistence in keeping a serious tone – "he ignores the story's preposterous elements and lets the audience decide whether to laugh, shudder, or both". Empire's William Thomas praised Jolie's performance, remarking, "when it comes to selling incredible, crazy, death-defying antics, Jolie has few peers in the action business", and The Village Voice's Karina Longworth considered that original star Tom Cruise would never express the protagonist's ambiguity as well as Jolie.

Among negative responses, The New Yorker's David Denby said Salt "is as impersonal an action thriller as we've seen in years", finding the supporting cast underexplored – "the tricky plot locks them into purely functional responses". Claudia Puig of the USA Today considered the film a "by-the-book thriller" with Jolie's performance as the only distinguishing feature. Lawrence Toppman of The Charlotte Observer described the film as absurd, overplotted, and incoherent, and said the villainous schemes "would have been called off 20 years ago at the latest when the Soviet Union dissolved". Steven Rea of The Philadelphia Inquirer described Salt as "commendably swift and progressively inane", saying the script was a "sloppy concoction of story elements from '70s espionage classics" that ended up not working right with its "nonsensical setups and wildly illogical twists". James Berardinelli of Reelviews considered that, while the film was fast-paced and the action scenes competently shot, the plot was predictable and "the spy aspects, which are, by far, the most intriguing elements of the movie, are shunted aside in favor of spectacular stunts and long chases".

=== Awards ===
Salt received one Academy Award nomination, for Best Sound Mixing (Jeffrey J. Haboush, Greg P. Russell, Scott Millan and William Sarokin), which it lost to Inception. The film won Best Action/Adventure Film at the Saturn Awards, with Angelina Jolie being nominated for Best Actress, and the Deluxe Unrated Edition being nominated for Best DVD Special Edition. At the Taurus World Stunt Awards, stuntwoman Janene Carleton's jump on a moving truck won Best Overall Stunt by a Stunt Woman, and the film was nominated for Best Stunt Coordinator and/or 2nd Unit Director. It was also nominated for Satellite Awards for Cinematography and Original Score, a Golden Reel Award for Sound Effects and Foley, a People's Choice Award for Favorite Action Movie, and two Teen Choice Awards. The film was nominated for a Visual Effects Society Award for Outstanding Supporting Visual Effects in a Feature Motion Picture but lost to Hereafter.

== Future ==
Director Phillip Noyce was optimistic about a sequel, saying "Hopefully within a couple of years, we'll have another one. Angelina's so great in this part. When audiences see the movie they're going to feel like it's only just the beginning." Producer Lorenzo di Bonaventura also expressed further interest: "Angie, I know, loved that character, and would love to explore the character some more first and foremost."

Noyce later said he had other projects and would not participate. "Those 3 Blu-ray disc cuts represent just about everything I have to offer on Evelyn Salt. If there ever is a sequel, better it's directed by someone with a completely fresh take on what I believe could be a totally entertaining and complex series of stories."

On June 6, 2011, Wimmer was announced as a screenwriter, but Jolie equivocated, "if it comes together right". She rejected Wimmer's first draft for "Salt 2" in early 2012. On December 10, 2012, Sony Pictures announced hiring screenwriter Becky Johnston (known for The Prince of Tides, Seven Years in Tibet, and Arthur Newman), as well as producers Lorenzo di Bonaventura and Sunil Perkash. The project ultimately died. Sony was said to be developing a Salt TV series as an alternative in 2016, but it also never came to fruition.
