= List of accolades received by Sicario (2015 film) =

The following is the complete list of awards and nominations received by 2015 film Sicario.

== Awards and nominations ==
Award	Category	Recipient	Result	Ref(s)
AACTA International Awards	Best Actress	Emily Blunt	Nominated	
AACTA International Awards	Best Supporting Actor	Benicio Del Toro	Nominated	
Academy Awards	Best Cinematography	Roger Deakins	Nominated	
Academy Awards	Best Original Score	Jóhann Jóhannsson	Nominated	
Academy Awards	Best Sound Editing	Alan Robert Murray	Nominated	
American Cinema Editors Awards	Best Edited Feature Film – Dramatic	Joe Walker	Nominated	
American Society of Cinematographers	Outstanding Achievement in Cinematography in Theatrical Releases	Roger Deakins	Nominated	
Art Directors Guild Award	Excellence in Production Design for a Contemporary Film	Patrice Vermette	Nominated	
Austin Film Critics Association	Best Supporting Actor	Benicio Del Toro	Nominated	
Austin Film Critics Association	Best Original Screenplay	Taylor Sheridan	Nominated	
Austin Film Critics Association	Best Cinematography	Roger Deakins	Nominated	
Austin Film Critics Association	Top Ten Films	Sicario	10th Place	
Bodil Awards	Best US Film	Sicario	Nominated	
British Academy Film Awards	Best Actor in a Supporting Role	Benicio Del Toro	Nominated	
British Academy Film Awards	Best Cinematography	Roger Deakins	Nominated	
British Academy Film Awards	Best Original Music	Jóhann Jóhannsson	Nominated	
Cannes Film Festival	Palme d'Or	Sicario	Nominated	
Chicago Film Critics Association	Best Supporting Actor	Benicio Del Toro	Won	
Chicago Film Critics Association	Best Cinematography	Roger Deakins	Nominated	
Critics' Choice Awards	Best Picture	Sicario	Nominated	
Critics' Choice Awards	Best Cinematography	Roger Deakins	Nominated	
Critics' Choice Awards	Best Action Movie	Sicario	Nominated	
Critics' Choice Awards	Best Actress in an Action Movie	Emily Blunt	Nominated	
Critics' Choice Awards	Best Score	Jóhann Jóhannsson	Nominated	
Dallas–Fort Worth Film Critics Association	Top 10 Films	Sicario	4th Place	
Dallas–Fort Worth Film Critics Association	Best Supporting Actor	Benicio Del Toro	5th Place	
Dallas–Fort Worth Film Critics Association	Best Director	Denis Villeneuve	5th Place	
Detroit Film Critics Society	Best Film	Sicario	Nominated	
Detroit Film Critics Society	Best Supporting Actor	Benicio Del Toro	Nominated	
Dublin Film Critics' Circle	Best Actress	Emily Blunt	4th Place	
Empire Awards	Best Thriller	Sicario	Nominated	
Empire Awards	Best Actress	Emily Blunt	Nominated	
Empire Awards	Best Soundtrack	Sicario	Nominated	
Evening Standard British Film Awards	Best Actress	Emily Blunt	Nominated	
Evening Standard British Film Awards	Technical Achievement	Roger Deakins	Nominated	
Florida Film Critics Circle	Best Cinematography	Roger Deakins	Nominated	
Houston Film Critics Society	Best Picture	Sicario	Nominated	
Houston Film Critics Society	Best Actress	Emily Blunt	Nominated	
Houston Film Critics Society	Best Cinematography	Roger Deakins	Nominated	
Houston Film Critics Society	Best Poster	Sicario theatrical poster	Nominated	
Location Managers Guild	Outstanding Locations in a Contemporary Film	S. Todd Christensen and Shani Orona	Won	
London Film Critics' Circle	Supporting Actor of the Year	Benicio Del Toro	Nominated	
London Film Critics' Circle	British / Irish Actress of the Year	Emily Blunt	Nominated	
London Film Critics' Circle	Technical Achievement	Tom Ozanich (sound design)	Nominated	
National Board of Review	Top Ten Films	Sicario	Won	
National Board of Review	Spotlight Award for Outstanding Collaborative Vision	Sicario	Won	
New York Film Critics Online	Top 10 Films	Sicario	Won	
Online Film Critics Society	Best Picture	Sicario	Nominated	
Online Film Critics Society	Best Director	Denis Villeneuve	Nominated	
Online Film Critics Society	Best Supporting Actor	Benicio Del Toro	Nominated	
Online Film Critics Society	Best Original Screenplay	Taylor Sheridan	Nominated	
Online Film Critics Society	Best Cinematography	Roger Deakins	Nominated	
Online Film Critics Society	Best Editing	Joe Walker	Nominated	
Producers Guild of America Award	Darryl F. Zanuck Award for Outstanding Producer of Theatrical Motion Picture	Basil Iwanyk, Edward L. McDonnell, Molly Smith	Nominated	
San Diego Film Critics Society	Best Editing	Joe Walker	Runner-up	
San Diego Film Critics Society	Best Cinematography	Roger Deakins	Won	
San Diego Film Critics Society	Best Sound Design	Sicario	Nominated	
San Diego Film Critics Society	Best Use of Music in a Film	Sicario	Nominated	
San Francisco Film Critics Circle	Best Supporting Actor	Benicio del Toro	Nominated	
San Francisco Film Critics Circle	Best Original Screenplay	Taylor Sheridan	Nominated	
San Francisco Film Critics Circle	Best Cinematography	Roger Deakins	Nominated	
San Francisco Film Critics Circle	Best Film Editing	Joe Walker	Nominated	
Satellite Awards	Best Film	Sicario	Nominated	
Satellite Awards	Best Supporting Actor	Benicio del Toro	Nominated	
Satellite Awards	Best Cinematography	Roger Deakins	Nominated	
Satellite Awards	Best Film Editing	Joe Walker	Won	
Satellite Awards	Best Sound (Editing and Mixing)	Alan Robert Murray, Tom Ozanich, Jon Reitz, William Sarokin	Nominated	
Saturn Awards	Best Thriller Film	Sicario	Nominated	
Saturn Awards	Best Actress	Emily Blunt	Nominated	
Saturn Awards	Best Music	Jóhann Jóhannsson	Nominated	
Saturn Awards	Best Make-up	Donald Mowat	Nominated	
Washington D.C. Area Film Critics Association	Best Film	Sicario	Nominated	
Washington D.C. Area Film Critics Association	Best Cinematography	Roger Deakins	Nominated	
Washington D.C. Area Film Critics Association	Best Editing	Joe Walker	Nominated	
Washington D.C. Area Film Critics Association	Best Original Score	Jóhann Jóhannsson	Won	
World Soundtrack Awards	Soundtrack Composer of the Year	Jóhann Jóhannsson	Nominated	
Writers Guild of America Award	Best Original Screenplay	Taylor Sheridan	Nominated	
