= Bryan Grill =

Visual effects artist

- Other name: Bryan M. Grill
- Occupation: Visual effects artist
- Years active: 1992-present

Bryan Grill is a visual effects artist.

He has been nominated for three Academy Awards and one BAFTA award.

== Oscar history ==
Both of these are in the category of Best Visual Effects.

- 83rd Academy Awards-Nominated for Hereafter. Nomination shared with Joe Farrell, Michael Owens and Stephan Trojansky. Lost to Inception.
- 87th Academy Awards-Nominated for Captain America: The Winter Soldier. Nomination shared with Dan DeLeeuw, Russell Earl and Dan Sudick. Lost to Interstellar.
- 94th Academy Awards-Nominated for Free Guy. Nomination shared with Swen Gillberg, Nikos Kalaitzidis and Dan Sudick.

== Selected filmography ==
- Apollo 13 (1995)
- The Fifth Element (1997)
- Titanic (1997)
- Armageddon (1998)
- Dr. Seuss' How the Grinch Stole Christmas (2000)
- Star Trek: Nemesis (2002)
- The Time Machine (2002)
- Flags of Our Fathers (2006)
- Letters from Iwo Jima (2006)
- Pirates of the Caribbean: At World's End (2007)
- G.I. Joe: The Rise of Cobra (2009)
- 2012 (2009)
- Hereafter (2010)
- The Avengers (2012)
- Journey 2: The Mysterious Island (2012)
- Iron Man 3 (2013)
- Captain America: The Winter Soldier (2014)
- San Andreas (2015)
- Black Panther (2018)
- X-Men: Dark Phoenix (2019)
- Free Guy (2021)
