= Michael Owens (visual effects artist) =

American assistant director and visual effects artist

- Occupations: Assistant director, visual effects artist

Michael Owens is an American assistant director and visual effects artist. He was nominated for an Academy Award in the category Best Visual Effects for the film Hereafter.

== Selected filmography ==
- Hereafter (2010; co-nominated with Bryan Grill, Stephan Trojansky and Joe Farrell)
