= Stephan Trojansky =

German-American visual effects artist

- Occupation: Visual effects artist

Stephan Trojansky is a German-American visual effects artist. He was nominated for an Academy Award in the category Best Visual Effects for the film Hereafter. Trojansky served as president of the Scanline VFX.

== Selected filmography ==
- Hereafter (2010; co-nominated with Michael Owens, Bryan Grill and Joe Farrell)
