= Na Wewe =

- Film poster
- Directed by: Ivan Goldschmidt
- Written by: Jean-Luc Pening; Ivan Goldschmidt
- Produced by: Ivan Goldschmidt; Jean-Luc Pening; Dries Phlypo; Jean-Claude van Rijckeghem
- Starring: Renaud Rutten; Fabrice Kwizera; Floris Kubwimana
- Cinematography: Guy Maezelle
- Edited by: Ivan Goldschmidt
- Music by: Jérémie Hakeshimana
- Production companies: Cut ! A Private View; Radio Télévision Belge Francophone
- Distributed by: Premium Films
- Release date: 25 April 2010
- Running time: 19 minutes
- Country: Belgium
- Languages: French; Kirundi; Flemish

Na Wewe (You Too) is a 2010 Belgian live action short film. The film's runtime is approximately 19 minutes, starring Renaud Rutten and Fabrice Kwizera. It was directed by Ivan Goldschmidt, written by first-timer Jean-Luc Pening, and produced by Goldschmidt, Pening, Dries Phlypo and Jean-Claude van Rijckeghem. The film was shot in the summer of 2009. It is set in Rwanda in 1994, during the civil war between Hutus and Tutsis and exposes the absurdity of ethnic conflicts. It's a "compact story about identity that's both tense and darkly funny".

== Plot ==
A minivan transporting ordinary citizens is stopped on a Burundian dirt road. With force a band of Hutu rebels armed with Kalashnikovs get the passengers off. The rebel leader barks:"Hutus to the left, Tutsis to the right!". The sorting fails as all hurry to the left and neither passengers nor rebels can distinguish Hutus from Tutsis.

== Accolades ==
The film received the Special Jury Award – Honourable Mention at the 20th Flickerfest. On 25 January 2011 it was nominated for the Academy Award for Best Live Action Short Film at the 83rd Academy Awards.
