= Joe Farrell (visual effects artist) =

Australian visual effects artist

- Occupation: Visual effects artist
- Spouse: Aliza Farrell

Joe Farrell is an Australian visual effects artist. He was nominated for two Academy Awards in the category Best Visual Effects for the films Hereafter and Shang-Chi and the Legend of the Ten Rings.

== Selected filmography ==
- Hereafter (2010; co-nominated with Michael Owens, Bryan Grill and Stephan Trojansky)
- Shang-Chi and the Legend of the Ten Rings (2021; co-nominated with Christopher Townsend, Sean Noel Walker and Dan Oliver)
- Werewolf by Night (2022)
