= Eyeline =

Canadian visual effects and computer animation company

- Formerly: Scanline VFX (1989–2025)
- Type: Subsidiary
- Industry: Visual effects
- Founded: 1989; 37 years ago, in Munich, Germany (as Scanline VFX); October 16, 2025; 12 months ago (as Eyeline)
- Founder: Thomas Zauner; Peter Claridge; Stefanie Stalf
- Number of employees: 1,200+ (2021)
- Parent: Netflix (2022–present)
- Website: eyelinestudios.com

Eyeline (formerly Scanline VFX) is a Canadian multinational visual effects and computer animation company founded in 1989 in Munich by Thomas Zauner, Peter Claridge, and Stefanie Stalf, later being led by VFX supervisor Stephan Trojansky beginning in the mid 2000's. The company has eight locations across six countries, including Munich, Stuttgart, Los Angeles, Vancouver, Montreal, London, Seoul and Hyderabad.

Eyeline has worked on hundreds of films, across many franchises including the Marvel Cinematic Universe (MCU) such as Spider-Man: Far From Home (2019), Black Widow, Shang-Chi and the Legend of the Ten Rings and Eternals (all 2021) along with DC Comics based projects such as Zack Snyder's Justice League, The Suicide Squad (both 2021) and The Batman (2022). They have also worked on Terminator: Dark Fate, Gemini Man (both 2019), Godzilla vs. Kong, Free Guy and Don't Look Up (all 2021).

During its tenure under Stephan Trojansky, Scanline built a name for itself for its frequent work on projects that involved complex simulation-based visual effects work, utilizing its own proprietary computational fluid simulation software known as Flowline. Notable examples include water-based creatures in The Chronicles of Narnia: Prince Caspian (2008) and Spider-Man: Far From Home (2019), tsunamis in 2012 (2009) and Hereafter (2010), large-scale destruction in Battleship (2012) and San Andreas (2015), and massive fireballs in Game of Thrones - The Bells (2019).

Scanline worked on a number of projects directed by Zack Snyder, including as the lead visual effects and animation vendor for Justice League (before and after Joss Whedon stepped in to complete production). Scanline later had the chance to complete unfinished sequences as part of HBO Max's Zack Snyder's Justice League (2021), again as the lead vendor.

Scanline also worked on multiple television shows including Game of Thrones season four (2014) and season eight (2019), for which it won an Emmy for Best Special Visual Effects, Shadow and Bone (2021–2023), Foundation (2021–present), Cowboy Bebop (2021) and Stranger Things season four (2022).

In November 2021, Netflix announced that it would acquire Scanline with plans for it to operate as a standalone business working with a variety of clients. The acquisition closed in the first quarter of 2022. Netflix integrated Scanline into Eyeline Studios, hiring computer graphics and imaging pioneer Paul Debevec as Chief Research Officer.

In October 2025, Netflix merged Scanline VFX with Eyeline Studios to form "Eyeline", complete with new and unified branding.

== Accolades ==
Scanline is responsible for the development of its proprietary fluid effects software, Flowline. Scanline was the sole developer of Flowline and in 2008, was the recipient of a Scientific and Technical Achievement Academy Award for the software.

In 2010, Scanline was nominated for an Academy Award for Best Visual Effects for its work on Clint Eastwood's Hereafter, for which it was the sole visual effects vendor.

Scanline received a BAFTA nomination for Best Special Visual Effects in 2010 for its work on Iron Man 3 as well as a second Academy Award nomination for Best Visual Effects in 2014, for Captain America: The Winter Soldier.

In 2010, Scanline won its first Visual Effects Society Award for Outstanding Supporting Visual Effects in a Feature Motion Picture for Hereafter. Scanline has two Emmy Awards for Outstanding Special Visual Effects to its credit for its work on Season Four and Season Eight of Game of Thrones as well as an HPA Award for Outstanding Visual Effects and a Visual Effects Society Award for Outstanding Created Environment for episode The Iron Throne.

Film and television awards
Year	Project	Award	For	Result
2014	Captain America: The Winter Soldier	VES Award	Outstanding Supporting Visual Effects in a Motion Picture	Won
2019	Game of Thrones - The Bells	Emmy Award	Special Visual Effects	Won
2019	Game of Thrones - The Bells	HPA Award	Outstanding Visual Effects - Episodic	Won
2020	Game of Thrones - The Iron Throne	VES Award	Outstanding Created Environment	Won

== Filmography ==
=== 2000s ===
Year	Films	Directors	Distributor(s)
2006	300	Zack Snyder	Warner Bros. Pictures
2006	Poseidon	Wolfgang Petersen	Warner Bros. Pictures
2007	The Invasion	Oliver Hirschbiegel	Warner Bros. Pictures
2008	Iron Man	Jon Favreau	Paramount Pictures
2008	The Chronicles of Narnia: Prince Caspian	Andrew Adamson	Walt Disney Studios Motion Pictures
2009	Vicky the Viking	Michael Herbig	Constantin Film
2009	2012	Roland Emmerich	Sony Pictures Releasing

=== 2010s ===
Year	Films	Directors	Distributor(s)
2010	The Ghost Writer	Roman Polanski	StudioCanal
2010	Hanni & Nanni	Christine Hartmann	UFA GmbH; Universal Pictures International
2010	The Last Airbender	M. Night Shyamalan	Paramount Pictures
2010	Hereafter	Clint Eastwood	Warner Bros. Pictures
2010	Gulliver's Travels	Rob Letterman	20th Century Fox
2011	Pirates of the Caribbean: On Stranger Tides	Rob Marshall	Walt Disney Studios Motion Pictures
2011	Super 8	J. J. Abrams	Paramount Pictures
2011	Vicky and the Treasure of the Gods	Christian Ditter	Constantin Film
2011	Hotel Lux	Leander Haußmann	Bavaria Film
2011	Immortals	Tarsem Singh	Universal Pictures
2011	When Santa Fell to Earth	Oliver Dieckmann	Bavaria Film
2012	Battleship	Peter Berg	Universal Pictures
2012	Looper	Rian Johnson	Sony Pictures Releasing
2012	The Avengers	Joss Whedon	Paramount Pictures
2012	The Amazing Spider-Man	Marc Webb	Sony Pictures Releasing
2012	Journey 2: The Mysterious Island	Brad Peyton	Warner Bros. Pictures
2012	The Apparition	Todd Lincoln	Warner Bros. Pictures (US); StudioCanal (Germany)
2012	Cloud Atlas	Lana Wachowski; Lilly Wachowski; Tom Tykwer	Warner Bros. Pictures
2012	Hanni & Nanni 2	Julia von Heinz	Universal Pictures International
2012	Zettl	Helmut Dietl	Warner Bros. Pictures
2013	White House Down	Roland Emmerich	Sony Pictures Releasing
2013	Iron Man 3	Shane Black	Paramount Pictures
2013	Man of Steel	Zack Snyder	Warner Bros. Pictures
2013	The Wolf of Wall Street	Martin Scorsese	Paramount Pictures
2013	A Good Day to Die Hard	John Moore	20th Century Fox
2013	Snowpiercer	Bong Joon-ho	CJ Entertainment
2013	Don Jon	Joseph Gordon-Levitt	Relativity Media
2013	The Almost Perfect Man	Vanessa Jopp	Warner Bros. Pictures
2013	Hanni & Nanni 3	Dagmar Seume	Universal Pictures International
2013	Girl on a Bicycle	Jeremy Leven	Warner Bros. Pictures
2014	Who Am I	Baran bo Odar	Sony Pictures Releasing
2014	The Hunger Games: Mockingjay – Part 1	Francis Lawrence	Lionsgate
2014	300: Rise of an Empire	Noam Murro	Warner Bros. Pictures
2014	Godzilla	Gareth Edwards	Warner Bros. Pictures
2014	Captain America: The Winter Soldier	Anthony Russo; Joe Russo	Walt Disney Studios Motion Pictures
2014	Divergent	Neil Burger	Lionsgate
2014	Exodus: Gods and Kings	Ridley Scott	20th Century Fox
2014	Pompeii	Paul W. S. Anderson	Sony Pictures Releasing
2014	Into the Storm	Steven Quale	Warner Bros. Pictures
2014	The Cut	Fatih Akin	Pandora Film Verleih
2014	Big Game	Jalmari Helander	EuropaCorp; Relativity Media
2014	Beauty and the Beast	Christophe Gans	Pathé
2014	Joy of Fatherhood	Matthias Schweighöfer	Warner Bros. Pictures
2015	Furious 7	James Wan	Universal Pictures
2015	San Andreas	James Wan	Warner Bros. Pictures
2015	In the Heart of the Sea	Ron Howard	Warner Bros. Pictures
2015	Point Break	Ericson Core	Warner Bros. Pictures
2015	Blackhat	Michael Mann	Universal Pictures
2015	Pan	Joe Wright	Warner Bros. Pictures
2015	The Manny	Matthias Schweighöfer	Warner Bros. Pictures
2015	Macho Man	Christof Wahl	Universum Film
2016	Batman v Superman: Dawn of Justice	Zack Snyder	Warner Bros. Pictures
2016	Miss Peregrine's Home for Peculiar Children	Tim Burton	20th Century Fox
2016	Suicide Squad	David Ayer	Warner Bros. Pictures
2016	The 5th Wave	J Blakeson	Sony Pictures Releasing
2016	The Shallows	Jaume Collet-Serra	Sony Pictures Releasing
2016	Ben-Hur	Timur Bekmambetov	Paramount Pictures; Metro-Goldwyn-Mayer Pictures
2016	Independence Day: Resurgence	Roland Emmerich	20th Century Fox
2016	The Most Beautiful Day	Florian David Fitz	Warner Bros. Pictures
2016	The Promise	Terry George	Open Road Films
2016	Welcome to Germany	Simon Verhoeven	Warner Bros. Pictures
2016	The Wild Soccer Bunch 6	Joachim Masannek	Walt Disney Studios Motion Pictures
2016	Seitenwechsel	Vivian Naefe	Warner Bros. Pictures
2016	Antonio, in Wonderland!	Sven Unterwaldt Jr.	20th Century Fox
2016	Manhunt: Escape to the Carpathians	Dominik Graf	Global Screen
2016	Friend Request	Simon Verhoeven	Warner Bros. Pictures
2016	Rogue One: A Star Wars Story	Gareth Edwards	Walt Disney Studios Motion Pictures
2017	Power Rangers	Dean Israelite	Lionsgate Films
2017	Geostorm	Dean Devlin	Warner Bros. Pictures
2017	Kong: Skull Island	Jordan Vogt-Roberts	Warner Bros. Pictures
2017	Guardians of the Galaxy Vol. 2	James Gunn	Walt Disney Studios Motion Pictures
2017	Renegades	Steven Quale	EuropaCorp; Universum Film
2017	Justice League	Zack Snyder	Warner Bros. Pictures
2017	King Arthur: Legend of the Sword	Guy Ritchie	Warner Bros. Pictures
2017	Transformers: The Last Knight	Michael Bay	Paramount Pictures
2017	Teenosaurus Rex	Leander Haußmann	Constantin Film
2017	Bullyparade: The Film	Michael Herbig	Warner Bros. Pictures
2017	In the Fade	Fatih Akin	Warner Bros. Pictures
2018	Hot Dog	Torsten Künstler	Warner Bros. Pictures
2018	Black Panther	Ryan Coogler	Walt Disney Studios Motion Pictures
2018	Tomb Raider	Roar Uthaug	Warner Bros. Pictures; Metro-Goldwyn-Mayer Pictures
2018	Jim Button and Luke the Engine Driver	Dennis Gansel	Warner Bros. Pictures
2018	Rampage	Brad Peyton	Warner Bros. Pictures
2018	Jurassic World: Fallen Kingdom	J. A. Bayona	Universal Pictures
2018	Ant-Man and the Wasp	Peyton Reed	
2018	The Meg	Jon Turteltaub	Warner Bros. Pictures
2018	Balloon	Michael Herbig	StudioCanal
2018	Aquaman	James Wan	Warner Bros. Pictures
2018	Bumblebee	Travis Knight	
2018	Bird Box	Susanne Bier	Netflix
2019	The Golden Glove	Fatih Akin	Warner Bros. Pictures
2019	Captain Marvel	Anna Boden; Ryan Fleck	Walt Disney Studios Motion Pictures
2019	The Goldfish	Alireza Golafshan	Sony Pictures Releasing
2019	X-Men: Dark Phoenix	Simon Kinberg	20th Century Fox
2019	Spider-Man: Far From Home	Jon Watts	Sony Pictures Releasing
2019	Between Two Ferns: The Movie	Scott Aukerman	Netflix
2019	Joker	Todd Phillips	Warner Bros. Pictures
2019	Gemini Man	Ang Lee	Paramount Pictures
2019	Terminator: Dark Fate	Tim Miller	20th Century Fox; Paramount Pictures
2019	Midway	Roland Emmerich	Lionsgate
2019	Charlie's Angels	Elizabeth Banks	Sony Pictures Releasing
2019	6 Underground	Michael Bay	Netflix

=== 2020s ===
Year	Films	Directors	Studio(s) and Distributor(s)
2020	NightLife	Simon Verhoeven	Warner Bros. Pictures
2020	Jim Button and the Wild 13	Dennis Gansel	Warner Bros. Pictures
2020	The Wrong Missy	Tyler Spindel	Netflix
2020	The Rescue	Dante Lam	CMC Pictures
2021	Godzilla vs. Kong	Adam Wingard	Warner Bros. Pictures
2021	Black Widow	Cate Shortland	Walt Disney Studios Motion Pictures
2021	Blood Red Sky	Peter Thorwarth	Netflix
2021	Free Guy	Shawn Levy	20th Century Studios
2021	The Suicide Squad	James Gunn	Warner Bros. Pictures
2021	Reminiscence	Lisa Joy	Warner Bros. Pictures
2021	Tides	Tim Fehlbaum	Constantin Film
2021	Shang-Chi and the Legend of the Ten Rings	Destin Daniel Cretton	Walt Disney Studios Motion Pictures
2021	The Battle at Lake Changjin	Chen Kaige; Tsui Hark; Dante Lam	Distribution Workshop; CMC Pictures
2021	Eternals	Chloé Zhao	Walt Disney Studios Motion Pictures
2021	Don't Look Up	Adam McKay	Netflix
2022	Moonfall	Roland Emmerich	Lionsgate
2022	The Batman	Matt Reeves	Warner Bros. Pictures
2022	The Adam Project	Shawn Levy	Netflix
2022	The Gray Man	Anthony Russo; Joe Russo	Netflix
2022	Me Time	John Hamburg	Netflix
2022	A Thousand Lines	Michael Herbig	Warner Bros. Pictures
2022	Black Adam	Jaume Collet-Serra	Warner Bros. Pictures
2022	Rheingold	Fatih Akin	Warner Bros. Pictures
2022	Black Panther: Wakanda Forever	Ryan Coogler	Walt Disney Studios Motion Pictures
2022	Slumberland	Francis Lawrence	Netflix
2023	Shazam! Fury of the Gods	David F. Sandberg	Warner Bros. Pictures
2023	The Flash	Andy Muschietti	Warner Bros. Pictures
2023	Creation of the Gods I: Kingdom of Storms	Wuershan	Beijing Jingxi Culture & Tourism; Huaxia Film Distribution
2023	Meg 2: The Trench	Ben Wheatley	Warner Bros. Pictures
2023	Spy Kids: Armageddon	Robert Rodriguez	Netflix
2023	Nyad	Elizabeth Chai Vasarhelyi; Jimmy Chin	Netflix
2023	Rebel Moon Part One: A Child of Fire	Zack Snyder	Netflix
2023	Aquaman and the Lost Kingdom	James Wan	Warner Bros. Pictures
2024	Godzilla x Kong: The New Empire	Adam Wingard	Warner Bros. Pictures
2024	Rebel Moon Part Two: The Scargiver	Zack Snyder	Netflix
2024	Atlas	Brad Peyton	Netflix
2024	Beverly Hills Cop: Axel F	Mark Molloy	Netflix
2024	Joker: Folie à Deux	Todd Phillips	Warner Bros. Pictures
2025	Happy Gilmore 2	Kyle Newacheck	Netflix
2025	Wake Up Dead Man	Rian Johnson	Netflix
2026	Bad Bay	Jake Szymanski	Netflix
2027	Narnia: The Magician's Nephew	Greta Gerwig	Netflix

== TV Series ==
Year(s)	Name of Series	Network
2011	Moby Dick	TMG
2011	Game of Thrones	HBO
2015	Tannbach	ZDF
2016	Stranger Things	Netflix
2018	The First	Hulu
2020	Cosmos: Possible Worlds	National Geographic
2021	Cowboy Bebop	Netflix
2021	Lisey's Story	Apple TV+
2021	The Nevers	HBO
2021	Foundation	Apple TV+
2021	Blackout	Joyn
2021	Shadow and Bone	Netflix
2021	Kitz	Netflix
2022–2025	Andor	Disney+
2023	One Piece	Netflix
2023	Monarch: Legacy of Monsters	Apple TV+
2023	Yu Yu Hakusho	Netflix
2024	3 Body Problem	Netflix
2024	Avatar: The Last Airbender	Netflix
2025	Wednesday	Netflix
2026	Daredevil: Born Again	Disney+
2026	Spider-Noir	MGM+
