= Sun Come Up (film) =

- Directed by: Jennifer Redfearn
- Distributed by: HBO; New Day Films
- Release date: April 8, 2010 (Full Frame)
- Running time: 38 minutes
- Country: United States

Sun Come Up is a 2010 documentary film on the effect of global warming on the Carteret Islands. The film showed at the 2010 Full Frame Documentary Film Festival on April 8. It was named as a nominee for the Academy Award for Best Documentary (Short Subject) at the 83rd Academy Awards on January 25, 2011, but lost to Strangers No More.
