= Jennifer Redfearn =

American filmmaker

- Occupation(s): Filmmaker, educator

Jennifer Redfearn is an American filmmaker and educator. Redfearn serves as the director of the film documentary program within University of California, Berkeley’s Graduate School of Journalism.

Redfearn is the director and producer the 2011 film Sun Come Up, which was nominated for an Academy Award for Best Documentary (Short Subject). Her 2021 documentary film Apart is about the impact of incarceration on families and communities.

== Filmography ==
- Sun Come Up (2011)
- Apart (2021)
