= William Sarokin =

American sound engineer

- Occupation: Sound engineer Documentary film maker
- Years active: 1984–present

William Sarokin is a semi-retired American sound engineer and documentary filmmaker. He was nominated for an Academy Award in the category Best Sound Mixing for the film Salt. He has worked on over 80 films since 1984.

== Selected filmography ==
Simpson Street, 1977 director/editor

Housing Court, 1983, co-director

- Salt (2010)
- This Must Be the Place (2011)
