= Hereafter (film) =

2010 film by Clint Eastwood

- Theatrical release poster
- Directed by: Clint Eastwood
- Written by: Peter Morgan
- Produced by: Clint Eastwood; Kathleen Kennedy; Robert Lorenz
- Starring: Matt Damon; Cécile de France
- Cinematography: Tom Stern
- Edited by: Joel Cox; Gary D. Roach
- Music by: Clint Eastwood
- Production companies: The Kennedy/Marshall Company; Malpaso Productions; Amblin Entertainment
- Distributed by: Warner Bros. Pictures
- Release dates: September 12, 2010 (TIFF); October 22, 2010 (United States)
- Running time: 129 minutes
- Country: United States
- Languages: English; French
- Budget: $50 million
- Box office: $107 million

Hereafter is a 2010 American fantasy disaster film directed, co-produced, and scored by Clint Eastwood and written by Peter Morgan. It tells three parallel stories about three people affected by death in similar ways—all three have issues of communicating with the dead; Matt Damon plays American factory worker George Lonegan, who is able to communicate with the dead and who has worked professionally as a clairvoyant, but no longer wants to communicate with the dead; Cécile de France plays French television journalist Marie Lelay, who survives a near-death experience during the 2004 Indian Ocean tsunami; and British schoolboy Marcus (played by Frankie and George McLaren), who loses the person closest to him. Bryce Dallas Howard, Lyndsey Marshal, Jay Mohr and Thierry Neuvic have supporting roles.

Morgan sold the script on spec to DreamWorks in 2008, but it was transferred to Warner Bros. Pictures by the time Eastwood (who has a long-standing relationship with Warner Bros.) had signed on to direct in 2009. Principal photography ran from October 2009 to February 2010 on locations in London, San Francisco, Paris and Hawaii.

Hereafter premiered as a "Special Presentation" at the 2010 Toronto International Film Festival on September 12, 2010. The film was given a limited release on October 15, 2010, and was released across North America on October 22, 2010. Although a box office success, the film received mixed reviews, with critics praising the plot and acting performances, while noting that the movie suffered from a lack of focus on the story.

== Plot ==
On assignment in Thailand, French television journalist Marie Lelay is caught in the 2004 Indian Ocean tsunami. Onlookers find her lifeless in the water and presume her dead, but she gasps back to life having glimpsed the afterlife. Didier, her producer and lover, reunites with Marie and they return to Paris, but the experience interfered with her work and Didier gives her a leave of absence. Marie travels to Switzerland to meet a hospice director, a former skeptic now convinced the afterlife exists. She persuades Marie to write a book on her experience, in hopes the scientific community will accept the reality of life beyond death.

In San Francisco, George Lonegan is asked by his brother Billy to perform a psychic reading for a wealthy client, Christos. Formerly a professional medium, as he is able to communicate with the dead after a childhood near-death experience, George eventually quit due to the emotional impact and the feelings of isolation. During the reading, George identifies the name "June", who Christos later admits was the name of his late wife's nurse with whom he was in love. George attends a cooking class where he meets and hits it off with Melanie, who eventually learns of his psychic ability. She asks George to perform a reading for her, and he speaks with her dead father, who asks for forgiveness for what he did to her as a child. Hearing this, Melanie becomes emotional and George never sees or hears from her again.

In London, 12-year-old twins Jason and Marcus try to prevent their alcoholic, heroin-addicted mother Jackie from losing them to social services. Jackie finally decides to get clean and sends Jason to the chemist to pick up her detox prescription; in doing so Jason is hit by a van and killed. Marcus is placed in a foster home and desperate to reunite with his brother; he steals money from the foster family to seek help in contacting Jason, but only encounters frauds. As Marcus attempts to board the London Underground at Charing Cross, Jason's cap is blown from his head and in trying to find it he misses the train, which subsequently explodes.

Having been in talks with a publisher about a biography of François Mitterrand, Marie instead submits a new manuscript: Hereafter: A Conspiracy of Silence. The publisher rejects the work, but steers her toward another in London. She also learns Didier does not intend to give back her job, as her reputation has been damaged from her fascination in the hereafter, and he is sleeping with another woman. George is laid off from his factory job and persuaded by Billy to revive his psychic practice, but instead he impulsively travels to London, visiting the Charles Dickens Museum and attending Derek Jacobi's live reading at the London Book Fair. Marie is also there reading her newly published book, Hereafter, which she signs for George; as she hands it to him, he sees a vision of her near-drowning.

Marcus also attends the event with the foster family and he spots George, who he has read about online. He is brushed off when he asks George to perform a reading, but follows George to his hotel, where he eventually relents. Through George, Jason tells Marcus he is happy in the afterlife, that he had knocked off his cap to save Marcus at the train station, and not to fear being alone. With this closure, Marcus visits his mother, who is improving in a rehab center. Marcus finds out the hotel where Marie is staying and informs George, who leaves a note inviting her to meet with him. Marie meets with George the next day, where he has a vision of them kissing, and the two immediately connect through their shared glimpses of the hereafter having made them better appreciate life.

== Cast ==
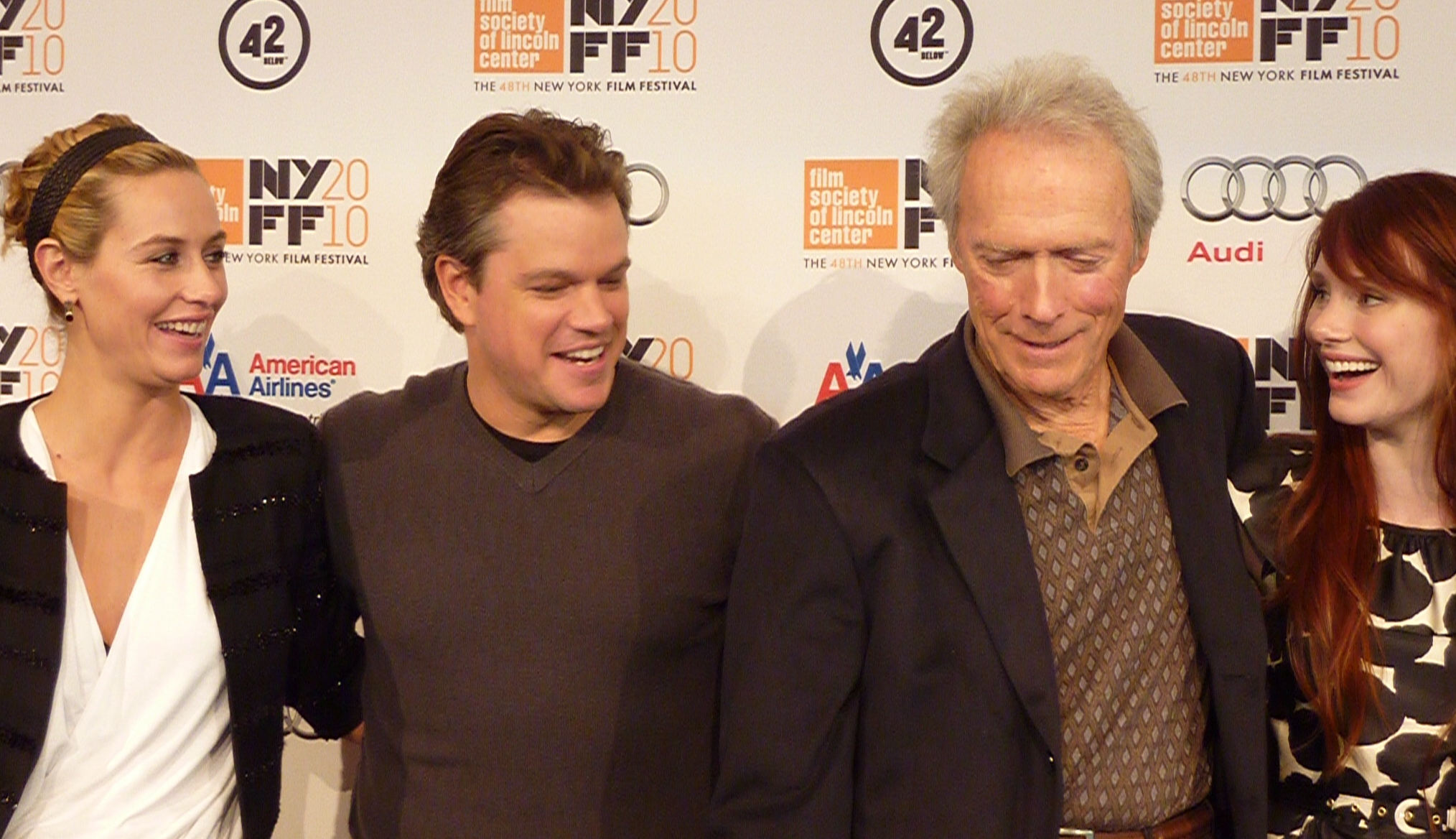
(L to R): de France, Damon, Eastwood, and Howard at the NYFF 2010 "Hereafter" Press Conference

- Matt Damon as George Lonegan, "a reluctant psychic [...] who can speak to the dead but prefers not to". Having previously starred in Eastwood's Invictus, he was cast in Hereafter because Eastwood was so impressed by him. The original Hereafter production schedule clashed with Damon's filming commitments to The Adjustment Bureau, so he initially suggested he recast the role of George for Ben Affleck, Christian Bale, Casey Affleck, Hayden Christensen or Josh Brolin. Instead, Eastwood altered the filming schedule so Damon could complete both films.
- Cécile de France as Marie Lelay, a French television journalist and tsunami survivor.
- Frankie and George McLaren as Jason and Marcus, twin brothers. At the beginning of the film, Frankie plays the role of Jason, and George the role of Marcus; then both play Marcus alternately. Jason is killed in a car accident early in the film, and Marcus later attempts to contact him in the afterlife. Eastwood chose untrained actors because he did not want "child actors who'd been over-instructed in Child Acting 101."
- Jay Mohr as Billy Lonegan, George's brother.
- Bryce Dallas Howard as Melanie, a woman with whom George tries to start a relationship.
- Thierry Neuvic as Didier, Marie's lover. (Neuvic was on holiday in Corsica in September 2009 when he was called to audition for a role in the film. His audition, which took place at a Paris hotel, lasted 15 minutes, and he read two scenes for Eastwood. Most of Neuvic's scenes were filmed in Paris.)
- Marthe Keller as a doctor and director of a hospice in Switzerland.
- Derek Jacobi as himself, reading Charles Dickens' Little Dorrit at the London Book Fair.
- Lyndsey Marshal as Jackie, Marcus and Jason's mother, a heroin addict.
- Richard Kind as Christos Andreou, a client of Billy's who asks for George's psychic assistance.
- Steven R. Schirripa as Carlos, the cooking instructor
- Jenifer Lewis as Candace, a woman who asks for assistance in contacting her dead child.
- Franz Drameh as a teenager attacking Jason
- Mylène Jampanoï as reporter Jasmine
- Stéphane Freiss as Guillaume Belcher, the boss interviewed by Marie Lelay on TV
- Laurent Bateau as Marie's TV producer
- Jean-Yves Berteloot: Michel, Marie's publisher.
- Niamh Cusack as Angela, Marcus's foster mother
- George Costigan as Dennis, Marcus's foster father
- Mathew Baynton as college receptionist
- Tim FitzHigham as himself/bearded author. Tim's book "All At Sea" also features in the film.
- Céline Sallette as the secretary
- Tom Price as the man

== Production ==
Peter Morgan wrote the script on spec, and it was bought by DreamWorks in March 2008. The deal was reportedly worth a "low-seven-figure advance". Executive producer Steven Spielberg was initially concerned that the low-key ending to the script would put audiences off the film, so Morgan rewrote it to be grander. However, subsequent drafts restored the original ending. Following its split from Paramount Pictures, DreamWorks retained the script, and began talks with Clint Eastwood to direct. Eastwood was signed on in November 2008. By the time of Matt Damon's casting in 2009, the script was being developed under the supervision of Eastwood's Malpaso Productions for Warner Bros. Pictures. Eastwood was attracted to the script because he was keen to direct a supernatural thriller, and liked how Morgan incorporated real-world events into fiction. Eastwood told LA Weekly: "There's a certain charlatan aspect to the hereafter, to those who prey on people's beliefs that there's some afterlife, and mankind doesn't seem to be willing to accept that this is your life and you should do the best you can with it and enjoy it while you’re here, and that'll be enough. There has to be immortality or eternal life and embracing some religious thing. I don't have the answer. Maybe there is a hereafter, but I don't know, so I approach it by not knowing. I just tell the story."

Production was based in the United Kingdom, due to tax incentives and funding from the UK Film Council, though filming locations spanned three countries. Filming commenced in France on October 19, 2009. A days filming was done at an old Belle Epoque period building, the former Grand Hotel du Planet (address: 700 Chemin du Planet, 74400 Chamonix-Mont-Blanc). This hotel building in the village of Le Planet near Argentière was transformed into a Swiss hospice for scenes between Cécile de France and Marthe Keller. A cordon was set up around the area to prevent local residents and paparazzi taking photographs of the set, though the mayor of Chamonix was allowed through for a brief meeting with Eastwood. Production then moved to Paris for four days. On October 21, a short scene between de France and Mylène Jampanoï was filmed in a stairwell inside the France Télévisions building.

In the first week of November, production moved to London for three weeks of filming in locations including Bermondsey and in Walworth. Scenes were also filmed on the Heygate Estate. On November 7, scenes were filmed in Petticoat Lane Market and at the Cafe Le Jardin in Bell Lane. Scenes were also filmed in an auditorium at Red Lion Square and at Camberwell New Cemetery. The room was redressed to represent a fictional Center For Psychic Advancement, which the Marcus character visits. A brief scene was filmed in a street in St. Pancras. De France filmed the underwater scene in a studio tank at Pinewood Studios. After these scenes were shot, production was halted, as Matt Damon was working on another film.

Filming resumed on January 12, 2010; Eastwood filmed scenes with de France for three days on the Hawaiian island of Maui. On the first day, scenes were filmed in the lobby and guest rooms of the Sheraton Maui Resort & Spa in Kaanapali. On January 13, scenes were filmed on Front Street in Lahaina. A hundred crew worked on the scenes. The location managers were given permission by Lahaina authorities to close a small section of the street in order to film scenes depicting "an unnamed, South Pacific-type outdoor marketplace, complete with outdoor shopping stalls and street vendors". The location manager explained to the Lahaina News, "Front Street's proximity to the water and the architecture of its buildings help supply a look that will require much less transformation towards this goal than other locations which were under consideration". The street was closed off to vehicles on the evening of January 12. The scene—the first scene of the film—depicts Cécile de France's character coming out of her hotel just as a tsunami hits the island. The aftermath of the tsunami was filmed on January 14 at a property in Kapalua.

Production next moved to the San Francisco Bay Area. On January 19, scenes featuring Damon were shot at the California and Hawaiian Sugar Company refinery in Crockett, California, and the exterior of C&H Sugar is seen on screen. The location was not announced until filming had concluded, for fear that large crowds would gather to watch. Filming also took place in Nob Hill, San Francisco and Emeryville. While production was in the Bay Area, it employed 300 local extras and crew members. Production returned to London on January 29 to shoot Damon's final scenes. Later in the month, the London Book Fair was recreated inside the Alexandra Palace for a scene featuring George and Marie. Publishers including Random House had their stands built for the three-day shoot, two months before the real London Book Fair took place.

Visual effects work was carried out by Los Angeles-based Scanline VFX. 170 visual effects were created, the key sequence of which was the tsunami, which features "full CGI water shots and CGI water extensions to water plates, digital doubles, CGI set extensions, matte paintings, digital make-up FX and full CGI environments with extensive destruction, from toppling digital palm trees to colliding digital cars". An effect described as the "hereafter effect" also appears, "[giving] the viewer glimpses into the afterlife".

== Release ==
After initial speculation by Variety that the film would be released in December 2010, Warner Bros. Pictures announced that Hereafter would go on general release in the United States and Canada on October 22, 2010.

A pre-release screening of Hereafter was held on August 10, 2010. The film had its world premiere on September 12, 2010, at the 2010 Toronto International Film Festival. The theatrical trailer was attached to The Town and Life as We Know It. Hereafter was also screened on October 10, 2010, as the Closing Night Film of the 48th New York Film Festival. The film was given a limited release on October 15, 2010.

The film premiered in Japan on February 19, 2011. A few days after the 11 March 2011 earthquake and tsunami in Japan, the film was withdrawn from all cinemas in that country, two weeks earlier than originally planned. "Warner Bros. spokesperson Satoru Otani said the film's terrifying tsunami scenes were 'not appropriate' at this time."

=== Critical reception ===
Hereafter has received mixed reviews from critics. On Rotten Tomatoes, 48% of 233 reviews were positive, with an average rating of 5.70/10. The website's critical consensus reads: "Despite a thought-provoking premise and Clint Eastwood's typical flair as director, Hereafter fails to generate much compelling drama, straddling the line between poignant sentimentality and hokey tedium." Metacritic, gave the film a weighted average score of 56% based on 42 reviews. Audiences surveyed by CinemaScore gave the film a grade "C+" on a scale of A+ to F.

Roger Ebert, gave it four out of four, calling it a film that "considers the idea of an afterlife with tenderness, beauty and a gentle tact. I was surprised to find it enthralling." Justin Chang of Variety called it: "A beguiling blend of the audacious and the familiar; it dances right on the edge of the ridiculous and at times even crosses over, but is armored against risibility by its deep pockets of emotion, sly humor and matter-of-fact approach to the fantastical." William Thomas of Empire gave it two out of five, and called it: "Slow, ponderous and as shallow as it thinks it is deep, lifted only by an impressive opening and fine work from Damon and Howard."

== Accolades ==
The film received a nomination for the Academy Award for Best Visual Effects, but lost to another Warner Bros. film, Inception. It won the Visual Effects Society Award for Outstanding Supporting Visual Effects in a Feature Motion Picture and was also nominated in the category of Outstanding Compositing in a Feature Motion Picture.
