= Ten Rings =

The Ten Rings may refer to:

- Ten Rings (organization), a fictional organization in the Marvel Cinematic Universe
- Ten Rings (object), a fictional weapon in the Marvel Cinematic Universe
  - Mandarin's rings, the Rings' counterpart in the Marvel Comics
- "The Ten Rings" (Marvel Studios: Legends), an episode of Marvel Studios: Legends

== See also ==
- Shang-Chi and the Legend of the Ten Rings, a 2021 film set in the Marvel Cinematic Universe
