= All Hail the King =

2014 Marvel Studios short film

- Release poster
- Directed by: Drew Pearce
- Screenplay by: Drew Pearce
- Based on: Marvel Comics
- Produced by: Kevin Feige
- Starring: Ben Kingsley; Scoot McNairy; Lester Speight; Sam Rockwell
- Cinematography: Michael Bonvillain
- Edited by: Dan Lebental
- Music by: Brian Tyler
- Production company: Marvel Studios
- Distributed by: Walt Disney Studios; Home Entertainment
- Release dates: February 4, 2014 (digital); February 25, 2014 (physical)
- Running time: 14 minutes
- Country: United States
- Language: English

All Hail the King is a 2014 American short film featuring the Marvel Cinematic Universe (MCU) character Trevor Slattery, produced by Marvel Studios and distributed direct-to-video by Walt Disney Studios Home Entertainment. It is a follow-up and spin-off of Iron Man 3 (2013), and is the fifth Marvel One-Shot short film set in the MCU, sharing continuity with the films of the franchise. The film is written and directed by Drew Pearce, and stars Ben Kingsley as Slattery, alongside Scoot McNairy, Lester Speight, and Sam Rockwell. In All Hail the King, a documentary filmmaker (McNairy) interviews the infamous fake terrorist Trevor Slattery while in jail.

Development for a One-Shot centered on Kingsley as Slattery began during production of Iron Man 3, which introduces the character. Pearce, who co-wrote that film, conceived of an idea that was contingent on Kingsley being willing to reprise his role. The actor was enthused to do so after reading the script. Filming occurred in Los Angeles over three days, with Pearce later flying to Canada to film Rockwell's appearance as Justin Hammer, reprising his role from Iron Man 2 (2010).

All Hail the King was released digitally and on the home media release of Thor: The Dark World (2013) in February 2014 and was positively received. The story of Slattery, the Mandarin, and the Ten Rings is continued in the film Shang-Chi and the Legend of the Ten Rings (2021).

== Plot ==
Trevor Slattery, an inmate at Seagate Prison, (Note: Following his arrest at the end of Iron Man 3 (2013).) is living with his own personal "butler" Herman, and other inmates acting as his fan club and protection. Slattery is interviewed by documentary filmmaker Jackson Norriss, who wishes to chronicle the events of the Mandarin situation. (Note: As depicted in Iron Man 3.) Norriss, trying to learn more about Slattery personally, recounts his past from his first casting as a child as well as his starring in the failed CBS pilot Caged Heat. Norriss eventually informs Slattery that his portrayal has angered some people, including the actual Ten Rings terrorist group, which Slattery did not know existed. Norriss tells him the history of the Mandarin and the terrorist group, before revealing that he is actually a member of the group. He then pulls out a gun and kills the guards and Herman before telling Slattery the real reason for the interview is to break him out of prison so he can meet the actual leader of the Ten Rings. Hearing this, Slattery still has no idea of the full ramifications of his posing as the Mandarin.

== Cast ==
- Ben Kingsley as Trevor Slattery: An inmate at Seagate prison who is the subject of a documentary by Jackson Norriss. Kingsley reprises the role from Iron Man 3.
- Scoot McNairy as Jackson Norriss:
  A member of the Ten Rings terrorist organization posing as a documentary filmmaker. In the comics the character's name is spelled "Norris", while a video released as part of a viral marketing campaign for Captain America: Civil War in May 2016 revealed that a separate character named Jackson Norris in fact exists elsewhere in the MCU.
- Lester Speight as Herman: Slattery's butler and protector in Seagate.
- Sam Rockwell as Justin Hammer: An inmate at Seagate prison, who was a weapons manufacturer. Rockwell reprises his role from Iron Man 2 (2010).

Additionally, Matt Gerald portrays White Power Dave; Crystal the Monkey portrays the bar monkey; and Allen Maldonado portrays Fletcher Heggs, who has a tattoo of a chess piece on his face as a nod to the comics, where he is a minor character going by "Knight".

== Production ==
=== Development and writing ===
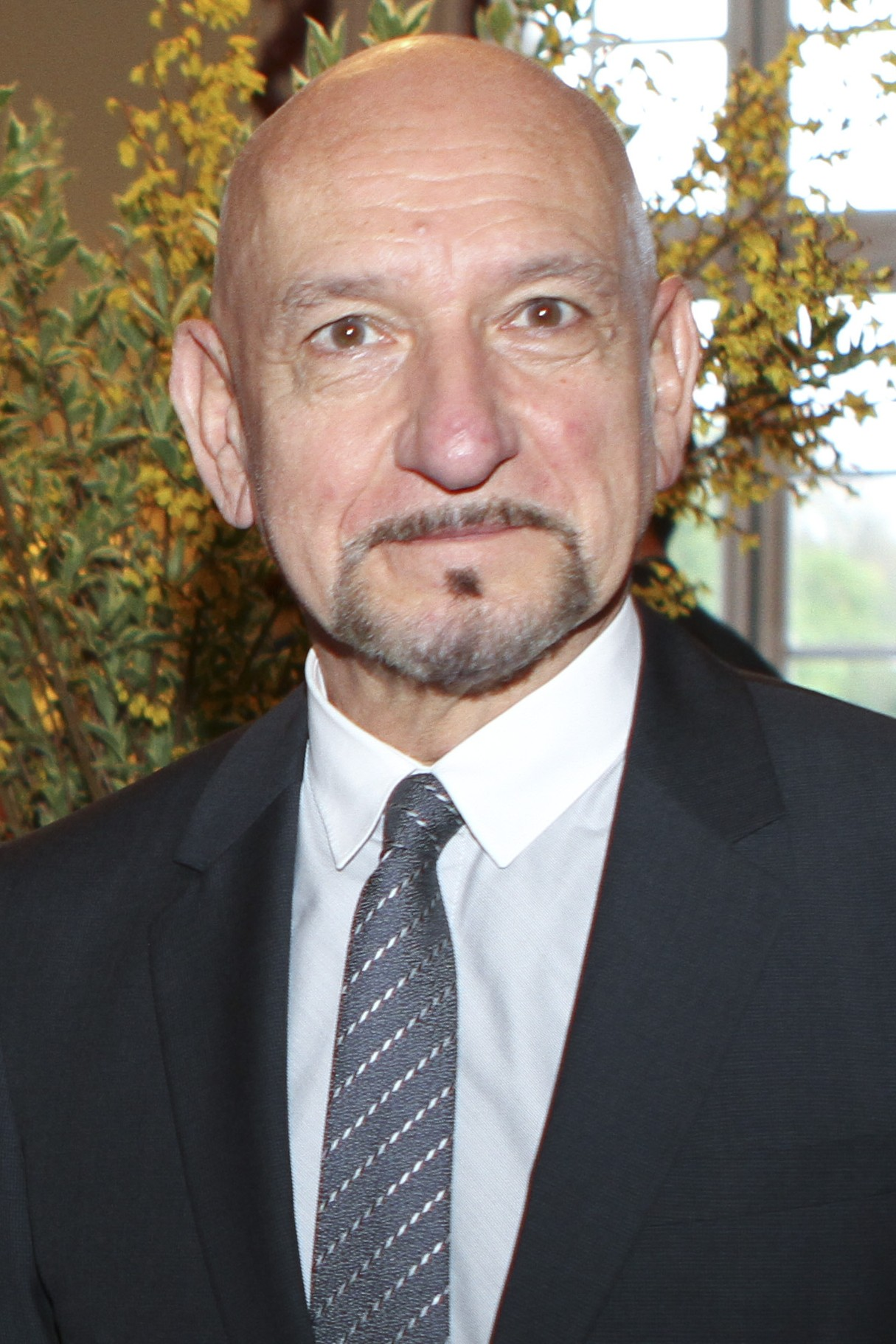
After Ben Kingsley was attached to All Hail the King, additional crew members signed on.

Drew Pearce, the co-screenwriter of the Marvel Cinematic Universe (MCU) film Iron Man 3 (2013), and producer Stephen Broussard had the idea for the Marvel One-Shots short All Hail the King during the production of Iron Man 3, to provide "a fresh take" on the Mandarin character. Marvel Studios and consultant Joss Whedon were positive about the short, reliant on Ben Kingsley's involvement. Kingsley was on board after reading the script, with Pearce believing he wanted to return because he enjoyed portraying Trevor Slattery. In October 2013, Kingsley said he was working on a secret project with Marvel involving "many members of the crew that were involved in Iron Man 3". This was later revealed to be the short, written and directed by Pearce. Iron Man 3 originally had Slattery dying in the film, so the One-Shot would have been a prequel exploring part of his past life. During the editing of Iron Man 3, when it was changed to have Slattery live, Pearce was less enthused about the short being a prequel since they "inevitably lack a sense of drama" and felt continuing Slattery's journey after the events of the film was "more exciting" since "you don't know what's going to happen".

Iron Man 3 director Shane Black felt Marvel "saw so many negative things" surrounding the Mandarin's portrayal, that the short was created as "an apology to fans who were so angry". Though some of the dialogue is written in response to critics of Iron Man 3's Mandarin portrayal, the story was written simply as an extension of the Ten Rings and Mandarin storyline featured throughout the Iron Man films. Pearce wrote the short to be ambiguous enough that the storyline could be further explored in future films or television series. On the Ten Rings, Pearce stated that he found the group to be a "very powerful" part of the MCU due to their introduction in the universe's first film, and noted that producer Kevin Feige was excited to see a member of the organization be "genuinely vicious". Because of this, Pearce worked to make the action in the short "real and brutal" to juxtapose the more comedic tone leading up to it, which he felt would increase the humor of Kingsley's Slattery anyway given that the character "does not respond to anything the same way any other right minded human being" should. Speaking about adding easter eggs and nods to the comics, Pearce noted that him adding them to the script did not necessarily mean that they were a part of Marvel's bigger plan for the MCU, and said that he enjoyed "stuff[ing] it full of MCU" and waiting to see if "some of it sticks and some of it remains just a kind of charming nod". The name Caged Heat was previously used by Marvel as the working title for Iron Man 3.

=== Filming and post-production ===
External videos
- All Hail the King Title presents the short film's main-on-end title sequence, YouTube video from Perception's channel

All Hail the King was filmed over three days in Los Angeles, including at a "disused women's prison" in the east side of Los Angeles. Pearce believed the production was "unbelievably lucky" to align their shooting schedule with Kingsley's, who had been working on a number of different projects. Two production units were utilized in order to capture the footage for the main short and the Caged Heat material. Both Marvel and Sam Rockwell were "on board" for a cameo appearance, but Rockwell was unable to do it due to working on Poltergeist (2015). However, during post-production of that film, Rockwell read the script for the short and called Pearce, saying that he was happy to participate if his scenes could be shot in Toronto during one of his breaks. Pearce went to Canada, and filmed Rockwell on a set that was painted to match the Los Angeles shoot, saying "Rockwell came in and just nailed it".

Music for the short was composed by Brian Tyler, with the Caged Heat scenes composed by 1980s TV-music icon Mike Post. The main-on-end title sequence, which was created by Perception, was inspired by Dr. No (1962), Charade (1963), and Iron Monkey (1993), as well as other kung fu exploitation films.

== Release ==
All Hail the King was released on the digital download release of Thor: The Dark World on February 4, 2014, and on February 25 for the Blu-ray release. It was included on the bonus-disc of the "Marvel Cinematic Universe: Phase Two Collection" box set, which includes all of the Phase Two films in the Marvel Cinematic Universe as well as the other Marvel One-Shots. The collection features audio commentary by Pearce and Kingsley, and was released on December 8, 2015. All Hail the King was made available on Disney+ on August 27, 2021, ahead of the release of Shang-Chi and the Legend of the Ten Rings which introduces the actual leader of the Ten Rings.

== Reception ==
IGN's Cliff Wheatley gave All Hail the King a 9.4 out of 10. He said that it's "a return to the loveable personality of the hapless Trevor and a step forward for the larger Marvel Cinematic Universe. It has its twists that should satisfy both lovers and haters of Trevor Slattery. But it's the approach that Pearce takes with the material, from the kung-fu movie style credit sequences to the light-hearted tone that takes a sudden and jarring turn. Kingsley once again shines in the role of Slattery, aloof and ignorant, but more than happy to slide back into Mandarin mode if it will please his adoring fans. Pearce does go for some of the same jokes from Iron Man 3 in a sort of referential way, but it's nothing too damaging."

Devin Faraci of Birth.Movies.Death called it "another excellent short film from the folks at Marvel Studios", which he felt deserved to be shown in theaters rather than just released on home media. He felt that the character of Slattery "was used the perfect amount in Iron Man Three, and giving him more screen time here, in a side project, feels the right way to return to him. Kingsley is having a blast, delivering plenty of wonderful jokes and sinking right into the clueless, egocentric character who represents all of our worst stereotypes of actors." Faraci praised the Caged Heat sequence, as well as Rockwell's cameo, and positively stated on the Mandarin reveal, "rather than a retcon this feels like an expansion, a pulling back of the curtain to reveal more of the picture." Conversely, Andrew Wheeler of ComicsAlliance criticized the short's presentation of homosexuality, given it was Marvel Studios' first attempt to bring LGBT concepts into the MCU. Brennan Klein at Screen Rant called it "a purely comic short that plays like a sketch from Saturday Night Live".

== Future ==
The film Shang-Chi and the Legend of the Ten Rings (2021) explores plot elements introduced in All Hail the King, such as the reveal of the real leader of the Ten Rings, Wenwu (Tony Leung), with Kingsley reprising his role as Slattery in the film. Shang-Chi director Destin Daniel Cretton said they wanted "to be true to" the One-Shot in the film, adding that "including that storyline in this movie I think was not only just really fun, I think it's essential to hear [Slattery] admit how ridiculous that whole situation was".
