= Trevor Slattery =

Character in the Marvel Cinematic Universe

- Marvel Cinematic Universe character
- Ben Kingsley as Trevor Slattery, in-character as the Mandarin, in promotional material for Iron Man 3. The reveal that Kingsley was playing Slattery, not the Mandarin, in the film received both fan backlash and critical praise.
- First appearance: Iron Man 3 (2013)
- Created by: Drew Pearce; Shane Black
- Portrayed by: Ben Kingsley

In-universe information
- Alias: The Mandarin
- Occupation: Actor; Jester
- Affiliation: Advanced Idea Mechanics (A.I.M.); Ten Rings
- Nationality: English

Trevor Slattery is a character portrayed by Ben Kingsley in the Marvel Cinematic Universe (MCU). An actor hired to portray the legendary terrorist leader of the Ten Rings dubbed "the Mandarin", he first appeared in the film Iron Man 3 (2013) and reprised the role in the Marvel One-Shot All Hail the King (2014) and in the film Shang-Chi and the Legend of the Ten Rings (2021), which features the real leader of the Ten Rings, Xu Wenwu (Shang-Chi's father). He also appears in the Wonder Man (2026) series. General response to the character was mixed, with many comic fans criticizing the character and how his reveal affected the film's Mandarin portrayal, while others defended the twist by noting its social commentary and how it avoided the racist caricature of the comics' Mandarin.

== Fictional character biography ==
=== Early life ===
As a child, Slattery is encouraged towards acting by his mother, eventually finding roles on stage, and in television and film. During this time, he develops a friendship with fellow actor Joe Pantoliano, even though Pantoliano at one point steals a role from Slattery.

=== Posing as the Mandarin ===
Washed-up and with a serious drug addiction, Slattery is eventually hired by Aldrich Killian and the think tank Advanced Idea Mechanics (AIM) to portray the Mandarin, a persona influenced by many modern terrorists and named after a supposed legendary Chinese title. Slattery stars in propaganda videos that are broadcast to the world as a cover for AIM's explosive Extremis experiments. Slattery lives oblivious to the true meaning of his actions, surrounded by wealth and drugs provided by AIM, until he is discovered by Tony Stark. Slattery is arrested following Stark's defeat of Killian, but was pleased by the publicity he received as he was arrested.

=== Incarceration ===
In Seagate Prison, Slattery lives luxuriously, with his own personal "butler" and adoring fans among the other inmates, until he is broken out by Jackson Norriss, a Ten Rings terrorist posing as a documentary filmmaker, who explains that the real "Mandarin" is angered with Slattery's use of the title, and wishes to take it back.

=== Helping Shang-Chi ===
Following the events of All Hail the King, Slattery was sentenced to death by the Ten Rings but Xu Wenwu, the real leader of the Ten Rings, made Slattery his "court jester" within his compound after Slattery entertained him with his Shakespeare monologues. While imprisoned, Slattery becomes sober and more refined, and befriends a captured hundun that he names Morris. In 2024, Slattery escapes the compound with the help of Wenwu's children Shang-Chi and Xialing as well as Shang-Chi's friend Katy, and travels with them to Morris' home, Ta Lo. Slattery helps defend the mystical village from the Ten Rings and later the forces of the Dweller-in-Darkness. After the Dweller's defeat, Slattery and Morris are present among the Ta Lo warriors at the funeral ceremony for those who were lost in the battle.

=== Mentoring Simon Williams ===
Two years after the events of Shang-Chi and the Legend of the Ten Rings, Slattery returns to Hollywood to pursue acting again, but is detained by the FBI and DODC. To avoid returning to prison to finish his interrupted term, Slattery accepts a deal with the DODC to gather surveillance on aspiring actor Simon Williams, whom the DODC claims is extremely dangerous due to superpowers Williams keeps hidden from the public. Over the next several months, Slattery provides information to the DODC while mentoring and forming a close friendship with Williams as they both struggle in the film industry, including auditioning for roles in the remake of the in-universe film Wonder Man. Simon withholds his superhuman status from the film's producers due to the industry rule barring superpowered actors from auditioning for the title role but eventually confides his secret to Slattery. After the two are cast as the leads in the high-profile film, Simon discovers Slattery's motives and unleashes his powers in a rage, destroying a large soundstage in the process. With the DODC closing in on Williams, a remorseful Slattery dons his Mandarin persona and broadcasts a video message claiming responsibility for the explosion. Even though the DODC still suspects Williams, Slattery is arrested and sent to a supermax DODC prison. Williams finishes working on the film while Slattery's role is recast with Pantoliano. Wonder Man becomes a commercial and critical success, but a lonely Williams decides to break Slattery out of prison. Posing as a security guard, Williams infiltrates the prison and uses his powers to free Slattery. The two friends reconcile before flying away together.

== Concept and creation ==
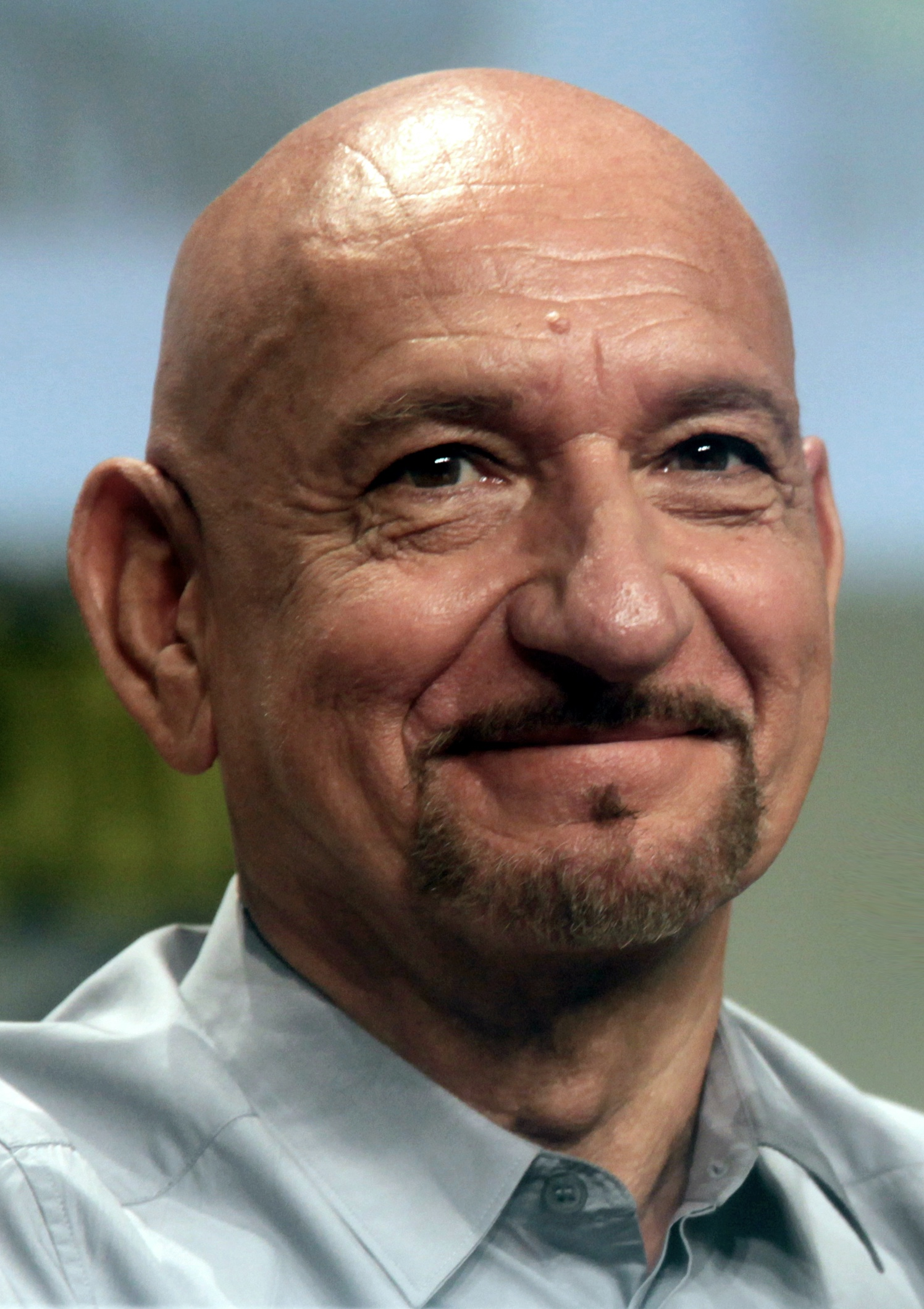
Kingsley at the 2014 San Diego Comic-Con

While writing the screenplay for Iron Man 3, Shane Black and Drew Pearce wanted to thematically reflect "the idea for Tony [Stark] of false faces and the idea of the dual personality of Tony as an out superhero who is basically using his self-definition through the false face of Iron Man." Pearce pitched, "what if the Mandarin is an actor?" to Black, and the character was developed from there. Ben Kingsley entered negotiations for the role in April 2012, and had joined the cast of Iron Man 3 by September, when he stated, "Quite soon I'll be with everybody and we'll be discussing the look and the feel and the direction of the character. It's very early days yet, but I'm so thrilled to be on board."

The idea for a Marvel One-Shot centered on Slattery was conceived on the Iron Man 3 set by Pearce and producer Stephen Broussard. Marvel Studios and consultant Joss Whedon were positive about the short, reliant on Kingsley's involvement. In October 2013, Kingsley said he was working on a secret project with Marvel involving "many members of the crew that were involved in Iron Man 3." This was later revealed to be the short, written and directed by Pearce. Though some of the dialogue is written in response to critics of Iron Man 3's Mandarin portrayal, the story was written simply as an extension of the Ten Rings and Mandarin storyline featured throughout the Iron Man films. Pearce wrote the short to be ambiguous enough that the storyline could be further explored in future films or television series.

== Characterization ==
For his performance as Slattery as the Mandarin, Kingsley "wanted a voice that would disconcert a Western audience. I wanted a voice that would sound far more homegrown and familiar—a familiarity like a teacher's voice or a preacher's voice. The rhythms and tones of an earnest, almost benign, teacher—trying to educate people for their own good." Black explained that part of altering the character from the comics was to avoid the Fu Manchu stereotype, and instead say that he "draws a cloak around him of Chinese symbols and dragons because it represents his obsessions with Sun Tzu in various ancient arts of warfare that he studied." The videos where the Mandarin gives historical background to the "attacks" show how he was created by "a think tank of people trying to create a modern terrorist", and so "represents every terrorist in a way," from South American insurgency tactics to the videos of Osama bin Laden. Colonel Kurtz from Apocalypse Now was also an influence for the Mandarin.

== Reception ==
The reveal of Trevor Slattery in Iron Man 3, after only his terrorist Mandarin persona had been marketed, was met with mixed responses, as many fans of the comics opposed the changes made to the original character. Matt Singer of Business Insider defended the twist, saying, "They are not upset with the movie because it's bad—that would be a legitimate complaint—they're upset because it's good, but not in the same way that the original comic books were good." Singer felt that the film "rather brilliantly evades that minefield [of the comics' racist caricature] by using it as the fuel for satire; revealing the Kingsley Mandarin's mish-mosh of Orientalist imagery as a construction designed to play into ignorant people's fears. Black suggests we should be far more worried about the well-dressed, amoral CEO than the vaguely defined "Other" of so many bad pieces of pop culture... Part of what I liked about Iron Man 3 was that it did something different. Where some readers saw a slap in the face, I saw a refreshing change."

Devin Faraci at Birth.Movies.Death. found the character more "satisfying" than a more faithful version of the character could have been, stating, "the reveal of the truth behind The Mandarin would be worthless if it was handled poorly. Thankfully Black has cast Sir Ben Kingsley in the role, and he demolishes the part. As The Mandarin he's a heart of darkness, a stylized amalgamation of four decades' worth of demagogues and terrorists. As Trevor Slattery... he's a comic dream, a dissolute mess into which Kingsley just hilariously collapses. It's a brilliant performance". Joey Esposito, writing for IGN, was "totally shocked" by the fan backlash to the character, feeling that the update was an improvement by avoiding "the traditional portrayal of the character[, that] being the perpetuation of a stereotype that has no place in modern society." Esposito thought that even the film's initial depiction of the Mandarin was "ridiculous and silly", and that the Slattery reveal "redeemed" that part of the film for him.

In response to the fan controversy, Pearce said, "I'm unbelievably proud of what we did, and also the fact that we actually snuck a surprise into a big summer movie, which is, on a logistical level alone, really hard to do, now. I was surprised at the small but vocal group's venom about [the character change], but... I could see how that surprise might be a bit of a shock. And I'm sorry that it pissed people off, but I'm also like, it's kind of our job to push the boundaries and surprise and hopefully delight." Black, also responding to the controversy, said, "What was of use about the Mandarin's portrayal in this movie, to me, is that it offers up a way that you can sort of show how people are complicit in being frightened... hopefully, by the end you're like, 'Yeah, we were really frightened of the Mandarin, but in the end he really wasn't that bad after all.' In fact, the whole thing was just a product of this anonymous, behind-the-scenes guy" rather than the "available and obvious target", "a message that's more interesting for the modern world".

Reviewing All Hail the King, Cliff Wheatley, also at IGN, described the short as "a return to the loveable personality of the hapless Trevor... that should satisfy both lovers and haters" of the character. He added that "Kingsley once again shines in the role of Slattery, aloof and ignorant, but more than happy to slide back into Mandarin mode if it will please his adoring fans." Faraci felt that the character "was used the perfect amount in Iron Man Three, and giving him more screen time here, in a side project, feels the right way to return to him. Kingsley is having a blast, delivering plenty of wonderful jokes and sinking right into the clueless, egocentric character who represents all of our worst stereotypes of actors."

=== Accolades ===
Sir Ben Kingsley won for Best Supporting Actor at the 40th Saturn Awards and was nominated for Choice Movie: Villain at the 2013 Teen Choice Awards.

== See also ==
- Characters of the Marvel Cinematic Universe
