= Shang-Chi (Marvel Cinematic Universe) =

Character in the Marvel Cinematic Universe

- Marvel Cinematic Universe character
- Simu Liu as Shang-Chi in Shang-Chi and the Legend of the Ten Rings
- First appearance: Shang-Chi and the Legend of the Ten Rings (2021)
- Based on: Shang-Chi by: Steve Englehart; Jim Starlin
- Adapted by: David Callaham; Destin Daniel Cretton; Andrew Lanham
- Portrayed by: Simu Liu; Jayden Tianyi Zhang (young); Arnold Sun (teenager)
- Voiced by: Simu Liu (What If...? season 3 and Marvel Zombies)

In-universe information
- Full name: Xu Shang-Chi
- Alias: Shaun
- Occupation: Assassin; Avenger; Hotel parking valet
- Affiliation: Avengers; Ten Rings
- Weapon: Ten Rings; Dragon scale gun
- Family: Xu Wenwu (father); Ying Li (mother); Xu Xialing (sister)
- Relatives: Ying Nan (aunt)
- Nationality: Chinese American

Xu Shang-Chi
- Simplified Chinese: 徐尚气
- Traditional Chinese: 徐尚氣
Transcriptions
Standard Mandarin
- Hanyu Pinyin: Xú Shàngqì
- Wade–Giles: Hsü^{2} Shang^{4}-ch'i^{4}
Yue: Cantonese
- Yale Romanization: Chèuih Seuhng-hei
- Jyutping: Ceoi^{4} Soeng^{6}-hei^{3}

Xu Shang-Chi (English: /ˈʃuː ʃɑːŋˈtʃiː/ SHOO shahng-CHEE; Chinese: 徐尚氣; pinyin: Xú Shàngqì) is a fictional character portrayed by Simu Liu in the Marvel Cinematic Universe (MCU) multimedia franchise, based on the Marvel Comics character of the same name. In the franchise, Shang-Chi is the son of Ying Li, the guardian of the mystical village of Ta Lo and Wenwu, the founder and first leader of the Ten Rings terrorist organization. Trained to be a highly skilled martial artist and assassin by his father, alongside his sister Xialing, Shang-Chi left the Ten Rings for a normal life in San Francisco, only to be drawn back into the world he left behind when Wenwu seeks him out. After traveling to his mother's home of Ta Lo and confronting his father, Shang-Chi is bequeathed Wenwu's ten rings and together with the Great Protector, the dragon and guardian of Ta Lo, they join forces to face a great demon known as the Dweller-in-Darkness.

Shang-Chi has been noted as being the first Asian superhero to lead a large-budget film, and Liu's portrayal has been positively received. He first appeared in Shang-Chi and the Legend of the Ten Rings (2021) and is set to return in Avengers: Doomsday (2026) and Avengers: Secret Wars (2027). Alternate versions of the character appeared in the third season of What If...? (2024) and Marvel Zombies (2025).

== Concept and creation ==
The character was conceived in late 1972 by writer Steve Englehart and artist Jim Starlin. Marvel Comics had wished to acquire the rights to adapt the Kung Fu television program, but were denied permission by Warner Communications, who was also the owner of Marvel's primary rival, DC Comics. Instead, Marvel acquired the comic book rights to Sax Rohmer's pulp villain Dr. Fu Manchu. Englehart and Starlin developed Shang-Chi, a master of kung fu, who was introduced as a previously unknown son of Fu Manchu. Though an original character himself, many of Shang-Chi's supporting characters were Rohmer creations. Starlin left the series after #17 (replaced by Paul Gulacy) and Englehart after #19 (replaced by Doug Moench). No characters from the Kung Fu television series were officially included in the comic series, though in the #19 issue the character Lu Sun bore such a strong resemblance to Kwai Chang Caine that to avoid copyright issues, the character was given a mustache throughout the issue. With artist Paul Gulacy, Shang-Chi's visual appearance was modeled after that of Bruce Lee. According to Englehart, his name was influenced by his study of the I-Ching, composed of 升 (shēng) meaning "ascending" and chi meaning vital energy.

Shang-Chi first appeared in Special Marvel Edition #15 (December 1973). He appeared again in issue #16, and with issue #17 (April 1974) the title was changed to The Hands of Shang-Chi: Master of Kung Fu. Amidst the martial arts craze in the United States in the 1970s, the book became very popular, surviving until issue #125 (June 1983), a run including four giant-size issues and an annual. In the comics, Shang-Chi is raised by his father Dr. Fu Manchu to be the ultimate assassin for the would-be world conqueror. After learning Fu Manchu's evil nature, Shang-Chi swears eternal opposition to his father's ambitions and fights him as a force for good. As the result of Marvel later losing the rights to the Rohmer estate, Fu Manchu was later renamed Zheng Zu. Starlin, who was previously unfamiliar with Fu Manchu until Larry Hama informed him of the racist nature of the Rohmer novels, attributed his early departure from the series due to his embarrassment over the revelation. In the 2015 "Secret Wars" storyline, a version of Shang-Chi resides in the wuxia-inspired K'un-Lun region of Battleworld. In this continuity, he is the exiled son of Emperor Zheng Zu, master of the Ten Rings, a ruthless martial arts clan that uses mystical powers and techniques based on the powers of the Mandarin's ten rings from the mainstream continuity.

According to Ed Brubaker, the copyright issue was one of the reasons for using the Mandarin as Shang-Chi's father. In the main continuity, the Mandarin had a son called Temugin who was trained in a monastery in martial arts and philosophy, his name is inspired by the real name of Genghis Khan, ancestor of the Mandarin.

According to Margaret Loesch, former president and CEO of Marvel Productions, in the 1980s Stan Lee approached Brandon Lee to play Shang-Chi for a movie or television series starring the character. In 2001, a Shang-Chi film entered development at DreamWorks Pictures but after failing to materialize by 2004, the rights to the character were reverted to Marvel. In 2004, David Maisel was hired as chief operating officer of Marvel Studios as he had a plan for the studio to self-finance movies. Marvel entered into a non-recourse debt structure with Merrill Lynch, under which Marvel got $525 million to make a maximum of 10 movies based on the company's properties over eight years, collateralized by certain movie rights to a total of 10 characters, including Shang-Chi. Following the successes of Black Panther and Crazy Rich Asians (both 2018), Marvel fast-tracked development of a Shang-Chi film, hiring David Callaham in December 2018 to write the screenplay and Destin Daniel Cretton to direct in March 2019. Cretton also contributed to Callaham's screenplay. Chinese Canadian actor Simu Liu, who had previously expressed interest in the role, was cast as Shang-Chi in July 2019, which was publicly announced by Cretton and Kevin Feige days later, along with the film's full title to be Shang-Chi and the Legend of the Ten Rings. After he was cast, Liu was called by Feige, saying that Liu's life was "about to change", having previously petitioning for the role since December 2018.

== Characterization ==
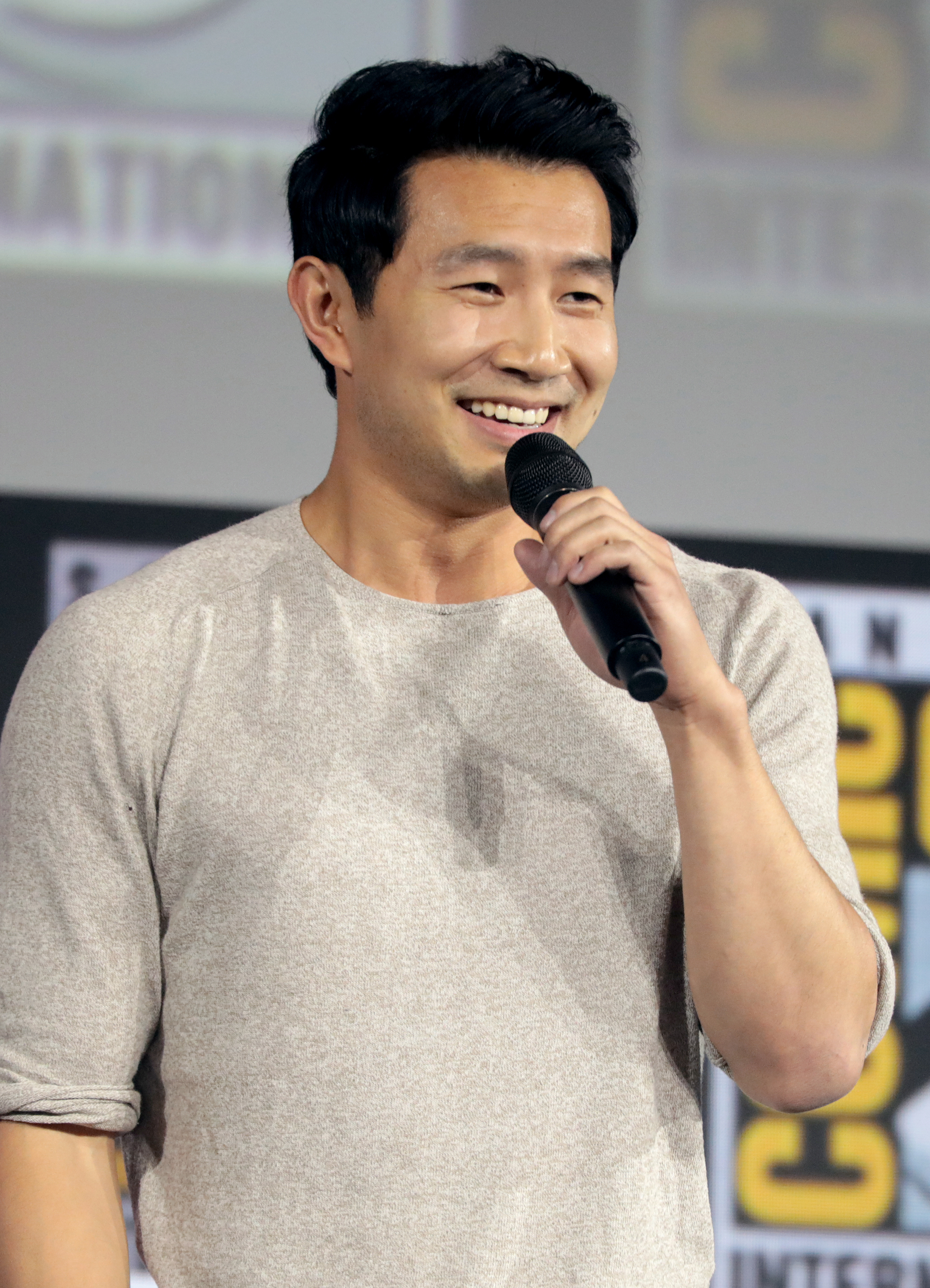
Simu Liu promoting Shang-Chi and the Legend of the Ten Rings at the 2019 San Diego Comic-Con

=== Appearances ===
Liu first appeared as the character in Shang-Chi and the Legend of the Ten Rings (2021). He is set to reprise the role in Avengers: Doomsday (2026), and the animated series Marvel Zombies (2025).

=== Inspirations and dispelling stereotypes ===
Both being of Asian descent, Cretton and Callaham were cognizant of some of the racial stereotypes surrounding Shang-Chi in the comics, with Liu saying everyone involved was "very sensitive to not have it go into stereotypical territory". Cretton believed the resulting script for Shang-Chi and the Legend of the Ten Rings was a "really beautiful update" to the character from what began in the comics, and was an authentic story about Asian identity. Callaham added that there is "no single Asian American voice", and he and Cretton contemplated how the film could speak to "the wider Asian diaspora" and would be "exciting and entertaining, but also personal to all these people". Cretton likened Shang-Chi to Will Hunting from Good Will Hunting (1997), who is a "mixture of masculinity and vulnerability", noting both characters had secrets and superpowers they do not understand while Liu believed that Shang-Chi's struggles with identity were the core of the character, rather than his martial arts skills.

When he was contacted to portray the role, Liu wanted the film to "allow society to see Asian men as powerful, desirable and an aspiration of possibility". Liu used experiences as a child battling stereotypes and microaggressions as being relatable to Shang-Chi's character arc of coming to terms with his heritage. He also sought to dispel stereotypes originating from Bruce Lee films in the 1970s that all Asian men know martial arts, making it clear in an Instagram caption that "Asian actors don't just do kung fu; but Shang-Chi does. It's one of the many things that flesh out his personality, but it's easily the most challenging from a physical perspective". Despite knowing little about the character at first, Liu was reassured early in Shang-Chi and the Legend of the Ten Rings's production that "it was very clear from the get-go that [Cretton] was committed to telling an origin story of a hero [that] was not stereotypical, not a trope, who was fully three-dimensional and had a fully modernized [2021] origin story. In addition to Bruce Lee he also cited Jet Li as one of his inspirations when approaching the character.

=== Character journey and fighting style ===
Shang-Chi leaves the Ten Rings organization for a normal life in San Francisco, with director Destin Daniel Cretton characterizing Shang-Chi as a fish out of water in the U.S. who attempts to hide that with his charisma, and does not know "who he really is". Shang-Chi changes his name to "Shaun" while living in San Francisco. Of Shang-Chi's decision to live a normal life, Liu found that "what he does is a little bit extreme. And it's also because he was raised under very extreme circumstances...I can't really fault him from taking extreme measures to get out of that situation." Cretton described Shang-Chi and the Legend of the Ten Rings as "a journey of stepping into who [Shang-Chi] is and what he's meant to be in this world". Since the character does not wear a mask, Liu performed many of his own stunts, having to work on his flexibility ahead of filming to do so. Liu also put on 10 pounds (4.5 kg) of muscle for the role. Liu was knowledgeable in taekwondo, gymnastics, and Wing Chun, and learned and trained in tai chi, wushu, Muay Thai, silat, Krav Maga, jiu-jitsu, boxing, and street fighting for the film. Liu called the process of training and performing stunts to be "exhausting. there were a lot of grueling hours...but it was one of the most fulfilling experiences in my life." Jayden Zhang and Arnold Sun portray Shang-Chi as a child and as a teenager, respectively.

For an early sequence in the film where Shang-Chi fights off assassins from the Ten Rings, Cretton took heavy inspiration from the works of Jackie Chan, working closely with choreographers Brad Allan and Andy Cheng, who were both trained in Chan's stunt team. Cretton stated that his favorite moment of the sequence was "The jacket stunt...when he's able to take his jacket off, spin it around and throw his jacket back on. It's a straight nod to Jackie Chan from the stunt team of Jackie Chan."

== Fictional character biography ==
=== Early life ===
Xu Shang-Chi was born to Xu Wenwu, the ancient leader of the Ten Rings organization, and Ying Li, a guardian of the mystical village of Ta Lo in an adjacent universe. Shang-Chi's childhood was blissful, with his father renouncing his criminal ways to spend time with his family and his mother entertaining him and his sister Xialing with tales of her village. When Li is murdered by the Iron Gang, old rivals of the Ten Rings, Wenwu takes up his mystical ten rings and takes Shang-Chi with him to the Iron Gang's hideout, where he proceeds to brutally massacre the gang. Wenwu reactivates the Ten Rings organization and has Shang-Chi trained in martial arts as an assassin under the brutal tutelage of Death Dealer. At the age of 14, Shang-Chi is sent on a mission to kill the Iron Gang's leader and avenge his mother. Despite his success, Shang-Chi is traumatized by the ordeal and flees to San Francisco to assume a new life, adopting the name "Shaun". He leaves his younger sister Xialing behind with his father. While attending high school, Shang-Chi befriended Katy, establishing a close friendship into adulthood.

=== Confronting his past and bequeathing the Ten Rings ===
10 years later, in present-day, Shang-Chi is working as a hotel valet, alongside Katy. During a dinner outing with their friend Soo and her husband, John, they are told by Soo to make something out of themselves mentioning the Blip. Shortly later, Shang-Chi is attacked by the Ten Rings led by Razor Fist on a bus. Shang-Chi fights them off but loses his pendant given to him by his mother. Fearing that the Ten Rings will attack Xialing for her pendant, Shang-Chi tracks her down and reveals his past to Katy, who agrees to help him. They find Xialing at her underground fight club in Macau, but are attacked by the Ten Rings led by Death Dealer, with Wenwu arriving to capture Shang-Chi, Katy, and Xialing after breaking up the fight. The trio are taken to the Ten Rings' compound, where Wenwu reveals that he believes Li is still alive and is being kept in Ta Lo, using the two pendants to create a map that can be used to enter the village. Wenwu plans to destroy the village after freeing Li and imprisons Shang-Chi and the others when they object to his plans.

The trio escape the compound with the help of Trevor Slattery and his hundun companion Morris and drive to Ta Lo to warn the village of the Ten Rings. At Ta Lo, Shang-Chi is introduced to his aunt and Li's sister Ying Nan, who explains the history of Ta Lo and reveals that Wenwu is being manipulated by the Dweller-in-Darkness into believing Li is still alive so he will use the rings to break the seal imprisoning it. Nan gifts Shang-Chi with an outfit crafted from the red dragon scales of the Great Protector, the dragon guardian of Ta Lo, and teaches him the fighting style of Ta Lo. Shang-Chi defends the village with his new allies when Wenwu and the Ten Rings arrive to destroy the seal. Shang-Chi fights his father, but is defeated and cast into a lake. Shang-Chi is revived by the Great Protector and uses his newfound powers to disarm Wenwu.

After the Dweller escapes its seal, Wenwu sacrifices himself to save Shang-Chi from the Dweller and bequeaths the ten rings to Shang-Chi, who uses them and the Ta Lo fighting style to destroy the Dweller. Shang-Chi later makes a paper lantern and lights it in memory of his father.

Shang-Chi and Katy return to San Francisco and get dinner with their friends, Soo and John, again. They are interrupted by Wong, the Sorcerer Supreme of the Masters of the Mystic Arts, those who saw him in the underground fight club, and follow him through a portal to Kamar-Taj. They are introduced to Bruce Banner and Carol Danvers via hologram. Wong, Banner, and Danvers discover that the rings are emitting a mysterious signal to an unknown location and Wong vows to keep looking into it. Banner welcomes Shang-Chi into the world of superheroes. After Banner leaves the call, Wong tells Shang-Chi to be prepared as his life has changed. Shang-Chi then suggests they go to a bar in San Francisco, and he, Katy, and Wong sing karaoke together.

== Alternate versions ==
Other versions of Shang-Chi are depicted in the alternate realities of the MCU multiverse, voiced by Simu Liu.

=== Gamma war ===
In an alternate 2024, Shang-Chi was recruited by Sam Wilson / Captain America to join him against the Apex Hulk and his gamma spawn army. During the battle of New York, Shang-Chi fought alongside Marc Spector / Moon Knight, Monica Rambeau, Bucky Barnes, Nakia, and the Red Guardian using the Mighty Avenger Protocol. After getting overpowered, he and the others watched as Banner turned into the Mega-Hulk to defeat the Apex. Afterwards, Shang-Chi watched as the Mega-Hulk led the remaining gamma monsters away.

=== 1872 cowboy ===
In an alternate 1872, Shang-Chi lived in 19th century America and was a cowboy nicknamed Ten Rings. He partnered with Kate Bishop and worked to rescue Chinese immigrants kidnapped by The Hood. He also sought to find his sister Xialing, who disappeared after confronting the Hood. One day, Shang-Chi broke into a saloon and confronted outlaw John Walker about the Hood's whereabouts. He and Bishop discovered a destroyed town and rescued a Chinese boy named Kwai Jun-Fan, who told them about a Ghost train and asked to join them. They located the train and went onboard where they were met by the Hood's ally Sonny Burch and his men. When the train arrived at the Hood's base, Shang-Chi was told to meet the Hood alone. After a fight, Shang-Chi learned the Hood was Xialing, who killed and replaced the previous Hood and was forcibly recruiting immigrants to overthrow the US government in retribution for the poor treatment of the Chinese. Shang-Chi decided to not fight her anymore. When Xialing attempted to kill him, she was killed by Bishop as the trademark hooded cloak is blown away. Shang-Chi and Bishop returned Jun-Fan and the immigrants to their home, where the townsfolk celebrated the Hood's defeat, before deciding to continue looking for adventure.

=== Other universes ===
In another alternate universe, Shang-Chi became that reality's version of Star-Lord.

=== Zombie Apocalypse survivor ===
In an alternate 2018, Shang Chi and Katy are among the survivors of a zombie apocalypse caused by Janet Van Dyne. During which, Shang-Chi is bitten in his arm by a zombie, for which Wenwu bestowed the Ten Rings to him to prevent the infection from spreading further. In the present, Shang-Chi, Jimmy Woo, Katy, Death Dealer, and a small group of survivors arrive at Helmut Zemo's sanctuary, the Raft, along with Kamala Khan's group. However, they fall into a trap set by Zemo to be sacrificed to the Talokanil zombie horde, led by a zombie Namor. Shang-Chi and the remaining team escape, leaving Yelena Belova behind, sacrificing herself as the Raft floods, and they head to New Asgard.

Shang-Chi and his group arrive at New Asgard, with Blade convincing Valkyrie to let them in with the help of his Khonshu pantheon. Upon entering, they see the Asgardians feasting on a gift from the Queen of Sokovia, revealed to be Zombie Wanda, the Queen of the Dead. The food was actually zombie remains, turning the Asgardians and the Red Guardian into zombies, and Zemo, Woo, and Dealer are killed by the zombies. Shang-Chi, Katy, Blade, Kamala, and Valkyrie flee while Thor battles Zombie Wanda, taking the opportunity to escape on the Asgardian spaceship beyond the atmosphere, where they activate the beacon. Upon rendezvousing with the Nova Corps in space, they reveal that Earth is under quarantine and no one is coming to help. After being shot down by the Nova Corps and falling back to Earth, they are saved and greeted by Peter Parker, Scott Lang's head, and the sorcerers of Kamar-Taj, who reveal that the energy of the Infinity Stones is being contained by the Hulk, who has become "Infinity Hulk". Arriving to help defend the Hulk, Shang-Chi and the remaining heroes fall one by one.

== Reception ==
Karen Rought of Hypable praised the decision to have Shang-Chi already know who he is and what he can do from the very beginning, contrasting with many familiar origin stories seen in other comic-book movies. Of this, Rought noted, "Yes, this is an origin story, but it was more about self-acceptance than self-discovery...that was a breath of fresh air for the first film about a new character in the MCU." She described Liu's take on the character to "offers us a perfect dichotomy in his role...He's a kind-faced, goofy, normal guy who hides a secret." Justin Chang of NPR was drawn into the character by his complicated relationship with Wenwu, saying that "[Shang-Chi] has a complicated, vaguely Oedipal rivalry with his father, who turned him into the fighting machine he is and subjected him to all manner of cruel manipulation and abuse", demarking the character's "depths of...trauma". Herb Scribner of Deseret called Shang-Chi "absolutely excellent" and that "he needs to be around for Marvel films for the foreseeable future." Scribner felt that "as Shang-Chi, Liu walks the line of a young man trying to find his way and a vulnerable young boy trying to find his family" and compared the character favorably to other leading characters in the MCU including Thor and Bruce Banner.

After comments from a 2017 interview in which Liu referencing that his parents told him that China was a "third world" country where people were "dying of starvation", a Chinese release for Shang-Chi and the Legend of the Ten Rings thus became unlikely. This led many Chinese fans to express disappointment that they would not be able to see the movie, citing the film's decision to remove controversial character elements related to Shang-Chi as a positive.

=== Awards and nominations ===
Awards and nominations received by Liu for his performance as Shang-Chi include:

Year	Award	Category	Nominated work	Result	Ref.
2021	People's Choice Awards	Male Movie Star of 2021	Shang-Chi and the Legend of the Ten Rings	Nominated	
2021	People's Choice Awards	Action Movie Star of 2021	Shang-Chi and the Legend of the Ten Rings	Won	
2021	Unforgettable Gala – Asian American Awards	Breakout Actor on Film	Shang-Chi and the Legend of the Ten Rings	Won	
2022	Hollywood Critics Association Film Awards	Game Changer Award	Shang-Chi and the Legend of the Ten Rings	Won	
2022	Critics' Choice Super Awards	Best Actor in a Superhero Movie	Shang-Chi and the Legend of the Ten Rings	Nominated	
2022	MTV Movie & TV Awards	Best Hero	Shang-Chi and the Legend of the Ten Rings	Nominated	
2022	MTV Movie & TV Awards	Best Fight	Shang-Chi and the Legend of the Ten Rings	Nominated	
2022	Saturn Awards	Best Actor in a Film	Shang-Chi and the Legend of the Ten Rings	Nominated	

== Future ==
In September 2021, Liu said that he had "no knowledge whatsoever of any of the future Marvel plans for this character or any other character" but would like to return for an adaptation of "Spider-Island", a comic he described as being a "very famous story in which Shang-Chi and Spider-Man have a little team-up moment" and that he would like for Shang-Chi to train Spider-Man in the "Way of the Spider". That same month, in an interview on the podcast Phase Zero, Liu also showed interest in starring in a future episode of What If...? as that would allow him to experiment with the character in ways he wouldn't be allowed to approach in film. In January 2022, one month after the sequel to Shang-Chi and the Legend of the Ten Rings was announced, Liu said that he wanted the film to explore what his character would do with his "newfound power" of the ten rings, as well as how he fits into the larger MCU.

== See also ==
- Characters of the Marvel Cinematic Universe
- Asian Americans in arts and entertainment
