= Drew Pearce =

British writer and director (born 1975)

- Pearce in July 2026
- Born: August 24, 1975 (age 51); Fife, Scotland
- Occupations: Writer, producer
- Years active: 1995–present

Drew Pearce (born August 24, 1975) is a British screenwriter, director, and producer best known for his work on The Fall Guy (2024), Hotel Artemis (2018), Iron Man 3 (2013), Fast and Furious Presents: Hobbs & Shaw (2019), and Mission: Impossible – Rogue Nation (2015).

Early in his career, Pearce created the British television comedy show No Heroics. He later wrote and directed the celebrated Marvel One-Shot film All Hail the King, starring Ben Kingsley, which served as the foundation for 2021's Shang-Chi and the Legend of the Ten Rings.

His directorial debut came with Hotel Artemis (2018), a futuristic thriller set in a secret, members-only hospital for criminals, starring Jodie Foster. Pearce has also made his mark directing music videos, including Vampire Weekend's "Gen-X Cops," Miles Kane's "Rearrange", and Father John Misty's "The Night Josh Tillman Came to Our Apt."

In 2019, Pearce founded the production company Point of No Return. The company's current projects include the Dave Bautista thriller Cooler (produced alongside Infrared and FilmNation) and the sci-fi legal drama Dolly.

== Early life ==
Pearce attended Sackville school in East Grinstead.

Pearce worked at The Face magazine for editor Richard Benson, while studying at Exeter University.

Between 2000 and 2004, Pearce was the lead singer and guitarist in the London alt-country band Woodchuck.

== Career ==
=== Television ===
No Heroics

In 2007, Pearce created the cult-hit series No Heroics, a sitcom about unsuccessful superheroes, following their R-rated off-duty exploits and their lives in hero-only pub The Fortress. The full series was shot in 2008, and released in October of that year. The show was ITV2's first original sitcom. No Heroics was well-reviewed by critics. The Times said of the show, "ITV2's new comedy No Heroics is fast, funny and a little ingenious. Drew Pearce, the creator/writer, established an engaging collection of pretenders to the throne". The show was nominated for Best New British TV Comedy of 2008 at the British Comedy Awards.

In 2009, ABC commissioned Pearce for an American adaptation pilot of No Heroics. Pearce was joined by Will & Grace writer Jeff Greenstein for the pilot.

=== Film ===
The Runaways

In 2010, Marvel hired Pearce to write a feature adaptation of Runaways based on the comic book of the same name by Brian K. Vaughan and Adrian Alphona. Development on the film was put on hold the following October, and Pearce explained in September 2013 that the Runaways film had been shelved due to the success of The Avengers. Years later, Runaways would eventually be released as a streaming television series created for Hulu by Josh Schwartz and Stephanie Savage.

Iron Man 3

In March 2011, Marvel announced that Pearce would co-write Iron Man 3 with director Shane Black. Black described their take on the film as not being "two men in iron suits fighting each other," and more like a "Tom Clancy thriller," with Iron Man fighting real-world type villains. Pearce added that they would avert magic and space, with Iron Man 3 being "a techno-thriller set in a more real-world than even The Avengers."

The film received positive reviews and was commercially successful, grossing over $1.2 billion worldwide, the second-highest-grossing film of 2013 overall, and the second-highest-grossing film at the domestic box office released in 2013.

Pearce continued his work as a writer on a wide array of projects. Pearce also completed an uncredited rewrite on Guillermo del Toro's sci-fi action thriller Pacific Rim. In October 2011, he was commissioned to write the script for a third film in the Sherlock Holmes film series starring Robert Downey Jr. The following year Pearce was tapped to polish the script for Legendary Pictures' Godzilla reboot.

Mission Impossible: Rogue Nation

In August 2013 Paramount Pictures announced the fifth Mission: Impossible film, from a script penned by Pearce. After developing the script with the director, Christopher McQuarrie, Pearce received a story by credit for Mission: Impossible – Rogue Nation. The film received positive reviews from critics and grossed $682 million worldwide.

Continuing his relationship with Paramount Pictures, Pearce was tapped to pen The Wedding Sting, a film based on The Atlantic article of the same title. Written by Jeff Maysh, the article tells the story of how the 1990 Flint police department devised a sting to put on a fake wedding that would lure the city's drug dealers to a single location.

Pearce then partnered with Jason Segel to create the concept for a third Lego Movie spin-off, titled The Billion Brick Race. In March 2015, Warner Bros. announced that the film was in development with its animation feature arm, Warner Animation Group. Pearce and Segel were initially signed on to co-direct and write the film, however, both subsequently stepped away from those roles. On 8 February 2018, they returned to the project when it was revealed that the initial director, Jorge R. Gutierrez, left it.

All Hail The King

During the production of Iron Man 3, Pearce and producer Stephen Broussard had the idea for a short film that provided "a fresh take" on the Mandarin character. Marvel Studios and consultant Joss Whedon were positive about the short, and after Ben Kingsley agreed to reprise his role as Trevor Slattery, Pearce wrote and directed the short, titled All Hail The King. The short was filmed in Los Angeles, with Sam Rockwell's cameo filmed in Toronto on a set that was painted to match the Los Angeles shoot.

All Hail the King was released on the digital download release of Thor: The Dark World on 4 February 2014, and on 25 February 2014 for the Blu-ray release. IGN's Cliff Wheatley gave All Hail the King a 9.4 out of 10. He said that it is "a return to the loveable personality of the hapless Trevor and a step forward for the larger Marvel Cinematic Universe. It has its twists that should satisfy both lovers and haters of Trevor Slattery. But it's the approach that Pearce takes with the material, from the kung-fu movie style credit sequences to the light-hearted tone that takes a sudden and jarring turn."

Hotel Artemis

Pearce made his feature directorial debut with the genre-bending, cult hit Hotel Artemis. The film, also written by Pearce, is a futuristic thriller, set in a secret, members-only hospital for criminals.

Two-time Academy Award winner Jodie Foster starred in the film, alongside an ensemble cast, including Sterling K. Brown, Dave Bautista, Sofia Boutella, Jeff Goldblum, Jenny Slate, Charlie Day, Zachary Quinto, Brian Tyree Henry and Kenneth Choi. Filming began in Los Angeles in May 2017, and Hotel Artemis was released on 8 June 2018 in North America, by Global Road Entertainment.

The film had received mostly positive reviews. Zoe Margolis of CineVue said, "Artemis is a bold, loud, ambitious film, far cleverer than the bog-standard summer blockbuster fare, and with sharp humour and driving suspense it makes this pulpy-sci fi thriller a very fun watch." Mick LaSalle of The San Francisco Chronicle praised the film saying, "It turns out that maybe no one should ever get in Pearce's way again." Marjorie Baumgarten of The Austin Chronicle praised the film stating, "With all the activity deriving from its basic concept of a members-only hospital for criminals, Hotel Artemis feels like a throwback to an earlier, more stripped-down era of action movies in which a good idea was a sufficient platform on which to drape fine acting and creative execution."

Hobbs & Shaw

Pearce co-wrote the script for the Fast & Furious franchise spin-off Hobbs & Shaw with Chris Morgan. The film was directed by David Leitch, produced by Seven Bucks Productions and Chris Morgan Productions, and was released by Universal Pictures. The film stars Jason Statham and Dwayne Johnson, returning as their respective characters Luke Hobbs and Deckard Shaw from the previous Fast and Furious films. The film also starred Idris Elba, Vanessa Kirby, Eiza González, and Helen Mirren, with cameos by Ryan Reynolds and Kevin Hart.

==== Point of No Return ====
In 2018 Pearce established production company Point of No Return Films in Los Angeles, California. The company focuses on developing and producing film and television projects aimed at reinventing genre. Its first production was Pearce's directorial debut, Hotel Artemis. On 26 June 2019, Variety announced that Netflix acquired Pearce's next film, Quartermaster, which Point of No Return will produce alongside Adam Siegel of Marc Platt Productions. It will be a "high-concept thriller" that Pearce is slated to write and direct.

==== Judge Dredd ====
In 2025, it was reported that Pearce would write a screenplay for a film centered around the comic character Judge Dredd. Taika Waititi is attached to direct.

=== Music videos ===
In March 2012, Pearce directed the music video for the song "Rearrange" by Miles Kane. By March 2018, it had received over 3.9 million YouTube views. Pearce went on to direct a video for the Father John Misty song "The Night Josh Tillman Came to Our Apt.".

== Filmography ==
Television

Year	Title	Director	Writer	Executive producer	Notes
1998	Bedrock	Yes	Yes	No	
2005	High Spirits with Shirley Ghostman	No	No	Yes	
2005	Damage Control	No	No	Yes	
2006	Lip Service	No	Yes	Yes	7 episodes
2007	The Musical Storytellers Ginger & Black	Yes	Yes	No	TV short; Also producer
2008	No Heroics	No	Yes	Yes	

Short film

Year	Title	Director	Writer
2010	The Committee Ep 1: Bad Dog	Yes	Yes
2010	The Committee Ep. 2: Butterfly Enclosure	Yes	Yes
2014	All Hail the King	Yes	Yes

Feature film

Year	Title	Director	Writer	Executive producer
2013	Iron Man 3	No	Yes	No
2015	Mission: Impossible – Rogue Nation	No	Story	No
2018	Hotel Artemis	Yes	Yes	Yes
2019	Hobbs & Shaw	No	Yes	No
2024	The Fall Guy	No	Yes	Yes
2027	The Thomas Crown Affair	No	Yes	No

Music video

Year	Title	Artist
2011	"Rearrange"	Miles Kane
2015	"The Night Josh Tillman Came to Our Apt."	Father John Misty
2020	"Better Run"	Nasty Cherry
2024	"Gen-X Cops"	Vampire Weekend
