= Ten Rings (organization) =

Fictional team in the Marvel Cinematic Universe

- Marvel Cinematic Universe organization
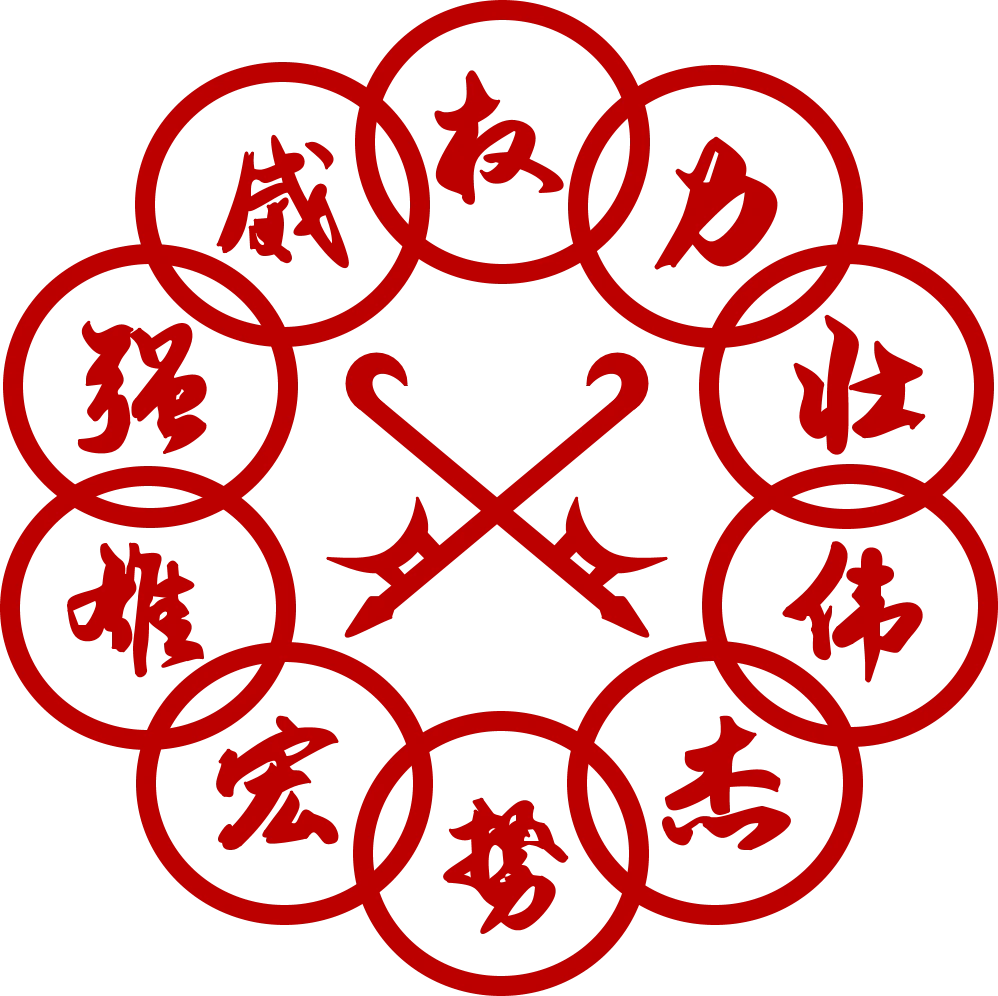
- Ten Rings logo
- First appearance: Iron Man (2008)

In-universe information
- Type: Criminal organization
- Founded: c. 1000 AD
- Defunct: 1996–2007
- Address: Ten Rings Headquarters, China
- Leader: Xu Wenwu (1000–1996, 2007–2024); Xu Xialing (2024–present)
- Key people: Currently: Jackson Norriss; Razor Fist; Formerly: Xu Shang-Chi; Raza; Death Dealer
- Technologies: Electroshock hook swords; Crossbows
- Affiliations: Ta Lo

The Ten Rings is a fictional organization in the Marvel Cinematic Universe (MCU). It is a clandestine criminal organization founded one thousand years ago by Xu Wenwu, an immortal warlord, and named after his mystical ten rings. An original creation for the MCU, the group's name is an homage to the Mandarin's ten cosmic rings in the Marvel Comics.

The organization appears in the films Iron Man (2008), Iron Man 2 (2010), Iron Man 3 (2013), Ant-Man (2015), and Shang-Chi and the Legend of the Ten Rings (2021); the miniseries VisionQuest (2026); and the One-Shot All Hail the King (2014). The Ten Rings were later integrated into the mainstream Marvel Universe.

== Fictional organization history ==
=== Origin ===
Thousands of years ago, Xu Wenwu discovered the Ten Rings, mystical iron rings that grant their user immortality and great power. Wenwu amasses an army of warriors, named after his Ten Rings, and conquers many kingdoms and topples governments throughout history. In 1996, Wenwu attempts to invade the mystical realm of Ta Lo, but is stopped and defeated by village's guardian, Ying Li. Wenwu and Li fall in love; forbidden from settling in Ta Lo due to his warlord past, Wenwu takes Li with him to his home in China, where they marry and have two children, Shang-Chi and Xialing. Content with his new life, Wenwu gives up his weapons and deactivates the Ten Rings organization to be with his family. When Li is murdered by the triad Iron Gang, old rivals of the Ten Rings, Wenwu takes up his rings and reactivates the Ten Rings organization, having Shang-Chi trained in martial arts as an assassin by Death Dealer; Xialing is forbidden from training due to her reminding Wenwu too much of Li. When Shang-Chi is 14, Wenwu dispatches him to kill the Iron Gang's leader and avenge Li. Despite his success, Shang-Chi is traumatized by the ordeal and abandons the Ten Rings, with Xialing following afterwards six years later.

=== Dealing with Iron Man ===
In 2010, Obadiah Stane, who has been trafficking Stark Industries weapons to the Ten Rings, hires the organization's Afghanistan cell to attack a US military convoy in the country. Unbeknownst to the Ten Rings, the convoy includes a visiting Tony Stark, whom Stane wants the Ten Rings to kill so he can gain control of Stark Industries. The cell instead captures Stark alive and sends a video message to Stane, demanding more money. Cell leader Raza demands Stark build a Jericho missile in exchange for his freedom. Knowing Raza will not keep his word, Stark and fellow captive Ho Yinsen build a prototype suit of powered armor to aid in their escape. The Ten Rings learns of their plans and attacks their workshop; Yinsen sacrifices himself to save Stark, who uses his armor to defeat his captors and destroy their weapons.

Despite this setback, the Ten Rings continues working with Stane, eventually purchasing Jericho missiles from him to attack multiple villages, including Yinsen's home village of Gulmira. Stark dons a sleeker, more powerful version of his improvised armor suit and flies to Afghanistan, where he saves the villagers from the Ten Rings. Meanwhile, Raza and his men are able to salvage the remains of Stark's prototype suit and meet with Stane. Stane double crosses Raza and has the entire cell killed by his mercenaries, taking the prototype armor for himself.

Shortly after Stark publicly reveals his identity as Iron Man, the Ten Rings helps arrange for Ivan Vanko to travel to Monaco to take revenge on Stark.

=== Copycat attacks ===
In 2012, in an effort to cover up explosions triggered by soldiers subjected to the Extremis program, Aldrich Killian and the think tank Advanced Idea Mechanics (AIM) hire English actor Trevor Slattery to portray Wenwu in propaganda videos that are broadcast to the world where he and the Ten Rings claim credit for the explosions. Possessing limited knowledge of Wenwu's history and basing it only on legends of the man, Killian creates the persona of "the Mandarin" for Slattery, and even uses the title for himself; Slattery is completely oblivious to the true meaning of his actions, believing he is only starring in a movie.

Wenwu is outraged over the appropriation of his image and organization; with Killian dead due to Stark's actions, Wenwu sends Ten Rings agent Jackson Norriss to break Slattery out of Seagate Prison to be executed. However, Wenwu becomes amused by Slattery's performances and has him imprisoned in his compound as a "court jester" to entertain him and the Ten Rings.

=== Meeting with Darren Cross ===
In 2015, when Darren Cross attempts to sell the Yellowjacket and Ant-Man suits, the Ten Rings sends one of its agents as a buyer. The plot is foiled by Scott Lang.

=== Battle of Ta Lo and new leadership ===
In 2024, Wenwu begins hearing Li's voice, telling him she is trapped in Ta Lo. Wenwu sends the Ten Rings to take the pendants that Li had gifted his children, Shang-Chi and Xialing. Razor Fist leads the mission to obtain Shang-Chi's pendant during a bus ride in San Francisco. After that mission is a success, Wenwu sends his men to take Xialing's pendant at her fight club in Macau, which leads to a brawl between Shang-Chi and Xialing against the Ten Rings operatives, led by Razor Fist and Death Dealer. Wenwu breaks up the brawl and takes his children and Shang-Chi's friend Katy to the Ten Rings compound.

Once there, he explains Li's predicament and uses her two pendants to create a map that reveals the location and time to enter Ta Lo. After revealing some of his son's history to Katy, Wenwu reveals his plans to destroy the village after freeing Li. He then imprisons his children and Katy when they refuse to go through with his plan. The three later escape the compound with Slattery and his hundun companion Morris to warn Ta Lo of the Ten Rings. Instead of giving chase, Wenwu decides to wait until the planned date to invade Ta Lo.

Wenwu and the Ten Rings arrive in Ta Lo to destroy the seal holding his wife, prompting a battle between the Ten Rings and the village inhabitants. Guided by Li's voice, Wenwu begins breaking the seal holding her in Ta Lo; unbeknownst to him, he is being manipulated by the Dweller-in-Darkness, who is using Li's voice to trick him into destroying its seal with his ten rings. Upon discovering that their weapons are useless against the Dweller and his minions, with one of these minions killing Death Dealer, the Ten Rings forms a truce with the villagers to fight the new threat. Meanwhile, Wenwu eventually realizes his mistake and sacrifices himself to save Shang-Chi from the Dweller by bequeathing him the ten rings, which Shang-Chi uses to destroy the Dweller. After the battle, the surviving Ten Rings members and villagers join together to honor the fallen in a paper lantern ceremony. Xialing is advised by Shang-Chi to disband the Ten Rings.

Xialing takes up leadership of the Ten Rings, which she restructures to include female fighters in the previously all-male organization.

=== Hunting Vision ===
The Ten Rings supply the bounty hunter Paladin with adamantium armor and ammunition for his mission to capture Vision. After Paladin repeatedly fails to capture Vision, his employer, known as the Client, terminates his contract and hires the Ten Rings to capture Vision instead. Led by Raza, who survived his encounter with Obadiah Stane, the Ten Rings ambush Vision and Paladin in Madripoor. Vision and Paladin temporarily join forces to fight off the attackers, while Paladin subdues Raza.

== Alternate versions ==
Alternate versions of the Ten Rings appear in the animated series What If...? and Marvel Zombies.

=== Thwarted by Killmonger ===
In an alternate 2010, Erik "Killmonger" Stevens saves Tony Stark when the Ten Rings attacks his military convoy in Afghanistan. Having previously infiltrated the Ten Rings, Killmonger uses his intel from his time within the organization to expose Obadiah Stane's involvement in the attack, leading to his arrest.

=== Alliance with Hela ===
In an alternate universe, Hela is banished to Earth in medieval China by Odin for her bloodlust and stripped of her crown and powers. Wenwu tries unsuccessfully to recruit Hela into the Ten Rings and she escapes after failing to steal his rings. Later, Odin attacks the Ten Rings, but Hela comes to their rescue after having had a change of heart while in the mystical realm of Ta Lo and defeats Odin, earning back her crown and the throne of Asgard. The armies of Asgard and the Ten Rings subsequently band together to form an empire of liberators to ensure freedom in the Nine Realms and beyond. This combined force later comes to the rescue of Gamora's people as Thanos prepares to slaughter them.

=== Imprisoned by Doctor Strange ===
The Xu Wenwu and Ten Rings of another alternate universe are amongst those abducted by Doctor Strange Supreme and imprisoned. Released by Captain Carter, they take part in the battle amongst the released prisoners with Wenwu briefly fighting the Black Panther Killmonger. Before being returned to his own universe, Wenwu gives Kahhori his rings to fight Doctor Strange with.

=== Zombie Apocalypse ===
The Xu Wenwu and Ten Rings of another alternate universe where a zombie plague infected the world, arrive to save Shang-Chi. After Wenwu's sacrifice, the organization rescues Shang-Chi, Katy, Jimmy Woo, and other survivors.

== Concept and creation ==
Iron Man's Marvel Comics premiere in Tales of Suspense #39 (March 1963) was a collaboration between editor and story-plotter Stan Lee, scriptwriter Larry Lieber, story-artist Don Heck, and cover-artist and character-designer Jack Kirby. In his origin story, wealthy industrialist Tony Stark is injured and taken prisoner by hostile forces in war torn Vietnam, but escapes his captors after building and donning a suit of powered armor. Due to the floating timeline of the Marvel Universe, the writers have updated the setting in which Stark is injured and builds his armor. In the original 1963 story, it was the Vietnam War. In the 1990s, it was updated to be the first Gulf War, and in the 2000s it was updated again to be the war in Afghanistan.

Screenwriter Alfred Gough said in 2007 that he had developed an Iron Man film for New Line Cinema which included the Mandarin as the villain, conceiving the character as a younger Indonesian terrorist who masquerades as a rich playboy Tony Stark is acquainted with. However, while working on Iron Man (2008), director Jon Favreau omitted the Mandarin in favor of Obadiah Stane as the main antagonist of the film, believing that the character and the fantasy elements of his rings felt unrealistic and were more appropriate for a sequel with an altered tone. Instead, the Mandarin is referenced via the Ten Rings terrorist group in the film, inspired by the Mandarin's ten rings. The Mandarin had originally been envisioned as a rival to Tony Stark with a building of his own right next to Stark Industries, with the Mandarin eventually drilling a hole underneath Stark Industries to steal all of Stark's technology for himself; associate producer Jeremy Latchman described that story as "crazy terrible" and "underwhelming". Favreau felt only in a sequel, with an altered tone, would the fantasy of the Mandarin's rings be appropriate. The decision to push him into the background is comparable to Sauron in The Lord of the Rings, or Palpatine in Star Wars. Due to the Iron Man films' setting of Afghanistan, the Ten Rings is depicted as a Middle Eastern terrorist group; the group's logo consists of ten interlocking rings adorned with Mongolian script, an easter egg referencing the Mandarin's claim of being descended from Genghis Khan in the comics. Following complaints from the Mongolian government of the language's usage being linked with terrorism after the release of Iron Man 3 (2013), Marvel issued an apology. Subsequent depictions of the Ten Rings dropped connotations with Middle Eastern terrorism and the organization's members were redesigned to resemble those of a modern clandestine criminal organization.

At Marvel Studios' San Diego Comic-Con panel in July 2019, the film Shang-Chi and the Legend of the Ten Rings (2021) was announced, confirming the return of the Ten Rings. Kevin Feige notes the Ten Rings organization's role throughout the MCU, and said the Mandarin would be introduced in this film with Hong Kong actor Tony Leung cast in the role. The character's real name "Wenwu" was revealed by Feige during Disney Investor Day in December 2019. Due to Leung's casting and the decision to make Shang-Chi the son of the Mandarin rather than Fu Manchu (later renamed Zheng Zu), the Ten Rings was completely redesigned to have a Chinese theme, with its members closely resembling those of Si-Fan, the criminal organization that Shang-Chi's father leads in the Master of Kung Fu series. The Ten Rings logo was updated from Mongolian script to "inoffensive" Chinese characters that are synonyms for strength or power written in ancient seal script. According to Shang-Chi and the Legend of the Ten Rings producer Jonathan Schwartz, the Ten Rings were changed from finger-worn rings, as depicted in the comics, to wrist-worn rings, such as the iron rings, due to the impracticality of the original design and their visual similarity to the Infinity Stones.

In Shang-Chi, Wenwu also refers to himself as "Master Khan", a pseudonym used in the main canon. This is a possible allusion to the idea that Wenwu is Genghis Khan himself. In Iron Man (2008), Raza also mentions the empire of Genghis Khan.

== Marvel Comics ==
Ten Rings

Publication information
- Publisher: Marvel Comics
- First appearance: Cameo appearance: Ironheart #1 (November 2018); Full appearance: Ironheart #2 (January 2019)
- Created by: Eve Ewing; Kevin Libranda; Geoffo; Luciano Vecchio

In-story information
- Type of organization: Criminal organization
- Agent(s): Midnight's Fire; Eclipse; Dune

Following its appearance in the Marvel Cinematic Universe, the Ten Rings organization was incorporated into Marvel Comics. The organization's existence was teased in Ironheart #1 (November 2018) by writer Eve Ewing and artists Kevin Libranda, Geoffo and Luciano Vecchio. The Ten Rings made its official comic debut in the following issue. Unlike the films, the organization in the comics is unrelated to the Mandarin.

The Ten Rings is a secret society that builds its principles around the Wellspring of Power. Ironheart becomes its first target when she is ambushed by two assassins that are empowered by the Wellspring of Power. They want Ironheart to give in to her power only so she would attack them. They vanish after the fight.

The Ten Rings sends Midnight's Fire to fight Ironheart to see if she is worthy of joining them. During her fight with Midnight's Fire, Ironheart learns that the Ten Rings is a terrorist organization whose ways of covert actions cause some people to believe that it is a myth. Midnight's Fire describes his history to Ironheart and tries to get her to join up with the organization. She turns him down and their fight continues. The Ten Rings is responsible for getting Councilman Thomas Birch elected as the Governor of Illinois. In order to make himself look good for Birch's election, Midnight's Fire has some children commit crimes. When Ironheart shows up to stop the Ten Rings, Midnight's Fire fights her and is defeated.

Ironheart later discovers that her father Demetrius Williams had faked his death in a gas station robbery gone wrong and joined the Ten Rings as Dune.

=== Other versions ===
==== Secret Wars (2015) ====
In Secret Wars, the Ten Rings is one of the many martial arts clans of Battleworld. The Ten Rings has the highest authority in K'un-L'un due to its master, Emperor Zheng Zu, winning the Thirteen Chambers tournament for almost 100 years. The Ten Rings is the sworn enemy of the Iron Fist school and its members have the ability to use ten martial arts techniques based on the Mandarin's rings.

== In other media ==
=== Television ===
In the animated series Iron Man: Armored Adventures, Xin Zhang, the show's depiction of the Mandarin, and later his stepson and successor as the Mandarin, Gene Khan, lead the Tong. A tong is a type of criminal organization of Chinese immigrants in the United States.

=== Board games ===
In the Secret Wars Volume 2 for Legendary: A Marvel Deck Building Game, there is an adaptation of the Battleworld version of Zheng Zu as Emperor of K'un-Lun and the Ten Rings school. The emperor's name is spelled Zheng Zhu.
