= Iron Man 3 =

2013 Marvel Studios film

- Theatrical release poster
- Directed by: Shane Black
- Screenplay by: Drew Pearce; Shane Black
- Based on: Iron Man by: Stan Lee; Don Heck; Larry Lieber; Jack Kirby
- Produced by: Kevin Feige
- Starring: Robert Downey Jr.; Gwyneth Paltrow; Don Cheadle; Guy Pearce; Rebecca Hall; Stéphanie Szostak; James Badge Dale; William Sadler; Miguel Ferrer; Jon Favreau; Ben Kingsley
- Cinematography: John Toll
- Edited by: Jeffrey Ford; Peter S. Elliot
- Music by: Brian Tyler
- Production company: Marvel Studios
- Distributed by: Walt Disney Studios Motion Pictures (Note: As part of the 2010 deal transferring the distribution rights of The Avengers (2012) and Iron Man 3 from Paramount Pictures to Walt Disney Studios Motion Pictures, Paramount received a residual associate credit ("in association with Paramount Pictures") in the film's credits and promotional materials; and its logo appears in the film's opening titles alongside Marvel Studios.)
- Release dates: April 14, 2013 (Grand Rex); May 3, 2013 (United States)
- Running time: 130 minutes
- Country: United States
- Language: English
- Budget: $200 million
- Box office: $1.215 billion

Iron Man 3 is a 2013 American superhero film based on the Marvel Comics character Iron Man, produced by Marvel Studios and distributed by Walt Disney Studios Motion Pictures. It is the sequel to Iron Man (2008) and Iron Man 2 (2010), and the seventh film in the Marvel Cinematic Universe (MCU). The film was directed by Shane Black from a screenplay he co-wrote with Drew Pearce, and stars Robert Downey Jr. as Tony Stark / Iron Man alongside Gwyneth Paltrow, Don Cheadle, Guy Pearce, Rebecca Hall, Stéphanie Szostak, James Badge Dale, William Sadler, Miguel Ferrer, Jon Favreau, and Ben Kingsley. In the film, Stark grapples with the consequences of the events of The Avengers (2012) during a national terrorism campaign on the United States led by the mysterious Mandarin.

After the release of Iron Man 2 in May 2010, director Jon Favreau chose not to direct the third film. Black was hired to write and direct the sequel in February 2011, working with Pearce to make the script more character-centric, focus on thriller elements, and use concepts from Warren Ellis's "Extremis" comic book story arc. The film's supporting cast, including Kingsley, Pearce, and Hall, were brought on throughout April and May 2012. Filming took place from May 23 to December 17, 2012, primarily at EUE/Screen Gems Studios in Wilmington, North Carolina. Additional filming took place around North Carolina as well as in Florida, Los Angeles, and China; an extended version of the film specifically for Chinese audiences was created. Seventeen companies provided the film's visual effects.

Iron Man 3 premiered at the Grand Rex in Paris on April 14, 2013, and was released in the United States on May 3, as the first film in Phase Two of the MCU. It received positive reviews from critics, with praise for its action sequences, Black's direction, and Downey's performance, though there was criticism for the portrayal of the Mandarin. The film was a box office success, grossing over $1.215 billion worldwide, making it the second-highest-grossing film of 2013 and the sixteenth film to gross over $1 billion. It finished its theatrical run as the fifth-highest-grossing film of all time, while its opening weekend was the sixth-highest of all time. The film received Best Visual Effects nominations at the Academy Awards and the BAFTA Awards.

== Plot ==
At a New Year's Eve party in 1999, Tony Stark meets scientist Maya Hansen, the inventor of Extremis, an experimental regenerative treatment that allows recovery from crippling injuries. Disabled scientist Aldrich Killian offers them a place in his company Advanced Idea Mechanics (A.I.M.), but Stark rejects him. Thirteen years later, Stark is suffering from post-traumatic stress disorder and has frequent panic attacks due to his experiences during the alien invasion of New York. (Note: As depicted in The Avengers (2012)) He has built dozens of new Iron Man suits to cope with his insomnia, creating friction with his girlfriend Pepper Potts.

Meanwhile, a string of bombings is claimed by a terrorist known as the Mandarin. Stark's security chief Happy Hogan is badly injured in one such attack and is put into a coma, prompting Stark to issue a televised threat to the Mandarin, revealing his home address in the process. The Mandarin sends gunship helicopters to destroy Stark's home. Hansen, who came to warn Stark, survives the attack with Potts. Stark escapes in an experimental new Iron Man suit, which his artificial intelligence J.A.R.V.I.S. pilots to rural Tennessee, following a flight plan from Stark's investigation into the Mandarin. Stark's new armor is not fully functional and lacks sufficient power to return to Malibu, leading the world to believe that he died.

With the help of Harley Keener, a local boy, Stark investigates the remains of a local explosion bearing the hallmarks of a Mandarin attack. However, it occurred years before any known attack by a terrorist. He discovers the "bombings" were triggered by soldiers subjected to Extremis whose bodies explosively rejected the treatment, and were falsely attributed by A.I.M. as a terrorist plot to cover up Extremis' flaws. Stark witnesses Extremis firsthand when Mandarin agents Savin and Brandt attack him. Stark kills Brandt and incapacitates Savin. Meanwhile, Killian resurfaces and kidnaps Potts with assistance from Hansen. American intelligence agencies continue to search for the Mandarin, with James Rhodes—the former War Machine, now re-branded as the Iron Patriot—lured into a trap to steal his armor.

Tracing the Mandarin to Miami, Stark infiltrates his headquarters using improvised weapons. Inside, he discovers the Mandarin is English actor Trevor Slattery, who is oblivious to the actions carried out in his image. Killian, the mastermind behind Slattery's cover, captures Stark. Killian, who appropriated Hansen's Extremis research as a cure for his own disability and expanded the program to include injured war veterans, reveals he has subjected Potts to Extremis in the hope Stark will help fix Extremis' flaws while trying to save her. When Hansen betrays Killian by threatening to jeopardize his operations, Killian kills her.

Stark escapes and reunites with Rhodes, discovering that Killian intends to attack President Ellis aboard Air Force One, using the Iron Patriot armor, controlled by Savin. Stark kills Savin, saving the passengers and crew, but cannot stop Killian from abducting Ellis. At an impounded damaged oil tanker, Killian intends to kill Ellis on live television, so that the Vice President would then become a puppet leader following Killian's orders, in exchange for Extremis curing his young daughter's disability. Stark and Rhodes infiltrate the platform, aided by the Iron Man suits, remotely controlled by J.A.R.V.I.S.. Rhodes secures the President and takes him to safety, while Stark discovers Potts has survived the Extremis procedure. Before he can save her, a rig collapses around them, and she falls to the platform to her apparent death. Stark fights Killian but finds himself cornered. Potts, whose Extremis powers allowed her to survive the fall, kills Killian to save Stark.

As a gesture of his devotion to Potts, Stark orders J.A.R.V.I.S. to destroy all the Iron Man suits. The Vice President and Slattery are arrested, and Happy awakens from his coma. With Stark's help, Potts's Extremis effects are stabilized. Stark promises to scale back his life as Iron Man, undergoing surgery to remove the shrapnel near his heart and throwing his obsolete chest arc reactor into the sea. He muses that, even without the technology, he will always be Iron Man.

== Cast ==
- Robert Downey Jr. as Tony Stark / Iron Man:
  An Avenger and a self-described genius, billionaire, playboy, and philanthropist with mechanical suits of armor of his own invention. Stark now struggles to come to terms with his near-death experience in The Avengers (2012), suffering from anxiety attacks. On making a third Iron Man film, Downey said, "My sense of it is that we need to leave it all on the field—whatever that means in the end. You can pick several different points of departure for that". On following up The Avengers, Downey said they "tried to be practical, in a post-Avengers world. What are his challenges now? What are some limitations that might be placed on him? And what sort of threat would have him, as usual, ignore those limitations?" Screenwriter Drew Pearce compared Tony to an American James Bond for both being "heroes with a sense of danger to them, and unpredictab[le]" even if Stark was a "free agent" instead of an authority figure like Bond. He also likened Tony to the protagonists of 1970s films such as The French Connection (1971), where "the idiosyncrasies of the heroes is what made them exciting".
- Gwyneth Paltrow as Pepper Potts:
  Stark's girlfriend, longtime associate, and the current CEO of Stark Industries. Paltrow says of her character's relationship to Tony, "[She still] adores Tony, but she absolutely gets fed up with him. He gets caught in a feedback loop." Kevin Feige commented on Pepper's role in the film: "The love triangle in this movie is really between Tony, Pepper and the suits. Tony, Pepper and his obsession with those suits, and the obsession with technology". Feige also stated the film uses the character to play with the damsel in distress trope, and posits the question, "Is Pepper in danger or is Pepper the savior?"
- Don Cheadle as James "Rhodey" Rhodes / Iron Patriot:
  Stark's best friend and the liaison between Stark Industries and the U.S. Air Force in the department of acquisitions. Rhodes operates the redesigned/upgraded War Machine armor, taking on an American flag-inspired color scheme similar to the Iron Patriot armor from the comics. Feige said of Rhodes and the armor, "The notion in the movie is that a red, white and blue suit is a bold statement, and it's meant to be. With Rhodey, he's very much the foil to Tony's eccentricities, and in this one you get to see this and be reminded of the trust and friendship between them in that great Shane Black buddy-cop fashion". In the film, the president asks Rhodey to take up the moniker "Iron Patriot", and don the red, white, and blue suit, in order to be the government's "American hero" in response to the events in The Avengers.
- Guy Pearce as Aldrich Killian:
  The creator of the Extremis virus and the founder and owner of the science and development organization Advanced Idea Mechanics who adopts the mantle of the Mandarin as his own. Killian develops Extremis to cure his own debilitating disability; in addition to his regenerative healing qualities, he has superhuman strength and the ability to generate extreme heat. Prolonged exposure to Extremis also grants him the ability to breathe fire. Pearce felt he was "a little more experimental" in the roles he was taking in his career, and was not keen on appearing in a superhero film, but felt his role in this film was "cameo stuff" which was a more enjoyable experience because he was "working in concentrated spurts". Pearce described Killian as a man with physical disabilities who has "never been able to accept those limitations" and works to overcome them, continuing, "His tenacity and blind determination in fighting for a better life are seen by some as irritating, as he often comes across as obnoxious." Black felt that Pearce ultimately is the Mandarin in the film, and that Marvel worked with him "to come up with these crazy things, these far out ideas" that divert from established expectations from the comics.
- Rebecca Hall as Maya Hansen:
  A geneticist whose work helped Killian create Extremis. Hall said Hansen would be a "strong female character," and described her decision to take the role, saying, "I decided to do Iron Man 3 because I've never done the 'hurry up and wait' movie before. Even the studio movies I've done have been small studio movies, or indie films that we made on a wing and a prayer. I love those, but Iron Man is refreshing in a way because it's something out of my realm of experiences". Hall confirmed her character's role was greatly reduced in the final film, saying, "I signed on to do something that was a substantial role. She wasn't entirely the villain—there have been several phases of this—but I signed on to do something very different to what I ended up doing".
- Stéphanie Szostak as Ellen Brandt:
  A war veteran who becomes an assassin after her exposure to Extremis. Describing Brandt, Szostak says, "... [Extremis] was a second chance at life. We talked about what you feel like and I think it almost makes you a fuller version of who you are, all your weakness and your qualities—just everything gets enhanced. I saw it as very freeing, almost you become your true-self and your fantasy-self all at once". The writers originally envisioned Brandt as Killian's main henchman, who would return throughout the film to fight Tony, but eventually, that role was reassigned to Eric Savin.
- James Badge Dale as Eric Savin:
  Killian's Extremis-powered henchman. Dale stated that his character in the film was "loosely based on" the comic version of the character. According to Dale, "Ben Kingsley is the mouthpiece. Guy Pearce is the brain. I'm the muscle".
- William Sadler as Matthew Ellis: The President of the United States, named after Warren Ellis, who wrote the "Extremis" comics arc that primarily influenced the film's story.
- Miguel Ferrer as Rodriguez: The Vice President of the United States.
- Jon Favreau as Happy Hogan:
  Tony Stark's former bodyguard and chauffeur who now serves as Stark Industries' head of security department. Favreau, who served as both actor and director on the previous two Iron Man films, said participating in the new film was "like [being] a proud grandfather who doesn't have to change the diapers but gets to play with the baby".
- Ben Kingsley as Trevor Slattery:
  A British actor who Killian hired to portray the Mandarin, a terrorist persona in jammed television broadcasts in which he is depicted as the leader of the international terrorist organization the Ten Rings. Kingsley was filming Ender's Game (2013) when he was cast, and said that, "Quite soon I'll be with everybody and we'll be discussing the look and the feel and the direction of the character. It's very early days yet, but I'm so thrilled to be on board". On his performance, Kingsley stated: "I wanted a voice that would disconcert a Western audience. I wanted a voice that would sound far more homegrown and familiar—a familiarity like a teacher's voice or a preacher's voice. The rhythms and tones of an earnest, almost benign, teacher—trying to educate people for their own good". The Mandarin was initially set to appear in the first Iron Man film, but he was put off for a sequel as the filmmakers felt that he was "too ambitious for a first [film]". On the character, Feige stated, "The Mandarin is [Iron Man's] most famous foe in the comics mainly because he's been around the longest. If you look, there's not necessarily a definitive Mandarin storyline in the comics. So it was really about having an idea". Black explains Kingsley's Mandarin is not Chinese in the film as he is in the comics in order to avoid the Fu Manchu stereotype: "We're not saying he's Chinese, we're saying he, in fact, draws a cloak around him of Chinese symbols and dragons because it represents his obsessions with Sun Tzu in various ancient arts of warfare that he studied". The filmmakers also cited Colonel Kurtz from Apocalypse Now (1979) as an influence for the character. The videos where the Mandarin gives historical background to the attacks expressed how it emerged as the product of "a think tank of people trying to create a modern terrorist". Thus the Mandarin "represents every terrorist in a way", from South American insurgency tactics to the videos of Osama bin Laden.

Paul Bettany reprises his role from previous films as J.A.R.V.I.S., Stark's AI system. Ty Simpkins portrays Harley Keener, a child who lives in Rose Hill, Tennessee, who assists Stark when the latter breaks into his garage in order to repair his suit. He later helps Stark investigate various incidents associated with the Extremis project, and afterwards he is rewarded by Stark with a garage-full of modern engineering tools and equipment. Simpkins reprises his role as Harley in a cameo appearance in Avengers: Endgame (2019). Simpkins has stated that he has a three-picture deal with Marvel Studios. Ashley Hamilton portrays Taggart, one of the Extremis soldiers. Adam Pally plays Gary, a cameraman who helps Stark. Shaun Toub reprises his role as Ho Yinsen from the first Iron Man (2008) film in a brief cameo, and Stan Lee makes a cameo appearance as a beauty pageant judge. Dale Dickey plays Mrs. Davis, mother of an Extremis subject that is framed as a terrorist. Wang Xueqi briefly plays Dr. Wu in the general release version of the film. A cut of the film produced for release exclusively in China includes additional scenes featuring Wang and an appearance by Fan Bingbing as one of his assistants. Jenna Ortega briefly appears uncredited as the vice president's daughter; her lines were cut from the final film. Mark Ruffalo makes an uncredited cameo appearance, reprising his role as Bruce Banner from The Avengers, in a post-credits scene. Comedians Bill Maher and Joan Rivers, and Fashion Police (2010–2017) co-host George Kotsiopoulos have cameo appearances as themselves on their respective real-world television programs, as do newscasters Josh Elliott, Megan Henderson, Pat Kiernan, and Thomas Roberts.

== Production ==
=== Development ===
Truthfully, the way to go about doing a part 3, if you're ever in that position, as I'm lucky enough to be, is to find a way that the first two weren't done yet. You have to find a way to make sure that the story that's emerging is still ongoing and, by the time you've finished 3, will be something resembling the culmination of a trilogy. It's about, 'How has the story not yet been completely told?,' and I think we're getting there. I think we've really found ways to make this feel organic and new, based on what's come before, and that's what I'm happy about.

— Shane Black, director of Iron Man 3, on the film.

Following the release of Iron Man 2 (2010), a conflict between Paramount Pictures, which had distribution rights to certain Marvel Comics properties, and The Walt Disney Company, Marvel Entertainment's then new corporate parent, clouded the timing and the distribution arrangement of a possible third film. On October 18, 2010, Walt Disney Studios agreed to pay Paramount at least $115 million for the worldwide distribution rights to Iron Man 3, with Disney, Marvel, and Paramount announcing a May 3, 2013, release date for the film.

Iron Man (2008) and Iron Man 2 director Jon Favreau said in December 2010 that he would not direct Iron Man 3, opting to direct Magic Kingdom instead. He remained an executive producer of director Joss Whedon's crossover film The Avengers (2012) and also served as an executive producer of Iron Man 3. Also in 2010, Downey reached out to Shane Black, who directed him in Kiss Kiss Bang Bang (2005), to write and direct the film. In February 2011, Black entered final negotiations to join the project, and in March it was announced that Drew Pearce, who Marvel had originally hired for a Runaways script, would work with Black on the script. Downey said, "Bringing in Shane Black to write and direct Iron Man 3 to me is basically the only transition from Favreau to a 'next thing' that Favreau and the audience and Marvel and I could ever actually sign off on." Black was initially hesitant to work with Pearce on the film, preferring to work with a writing partner of his own, but after a week of discussing the film and getting to know one another, agreed to write the film with Pearce.

==== Writing ====
Black described his take on the film as not being "two men in iron suits fighting each other," and more like a "Tom Clancy thriller", with Iron Man fighting real-world type villains. Pearce added that they would avoid magic and space, with Iron Man 3 being "a techno-thriller set in a more real world than even The Avengers". The duo spent some time discussing themes and images and ideas before starting the script. While writing, the focus was to avoid scenes of pure exposition, making every moment propel other narrative points forward. Some elements from the comics were used even if in different connotations, such as making Rhodes wear Norman Osborn's Iron Patriot armor and naming some characters with names from unrelated people in the Marvel Universe, such as Eric Savin and Jack Taggart.

The film's plot is influenced primarily by the "Extremis" (2005-2006) comics storyline, written by Warren Ellis. The first two acts would remain character-centric, albeit in Black's words "more hectic, frenetic, and large scale" to fulfill its sequel obligations, with the third act going for more over-the-top action to what Pearce described as "giving a sense of opera". The middle act was compared to Sullivan's Travels (1941) in having Tony meeting various people on his journey, and the writers made sure to not make the characters too similar. The initial draft had Maya Hansen herself leading the villainous operation, with the Mandarin and Killian emerging as antagonists in later versions of the script. During one of the writing sessions, Pearce suggested that the Mandarin was a fake, and Black agreed by going with making him an actor, which in turn Pearce detailed as an overacting British stage performer. Black explained: "Who would be fool enough to declare that he is an international terrorist? If you're smart, whatever regime you're part of, you'd put a puppet committee and remain your house". In turn Killian would hide Trevor Slattery in "his own frat house, in kind of a drug-related house arrest" to keep the secret alive.

According to Black, the reveal of the actual villain being Hansen was "like Remington Steele (1982-1987), you think it's the man but at the end, the woman has been running the whole show." The role was eventually shifted to Killian because of objections by Marvel Entertainment executives, who were concerned with apparent merchandising losses that could come with having a female villain. The roles of several other major female characters were also made smaller in the final film compared to earlier drafts.

Both the opening and the ending of the film were reworked in various ways. First it would begin with a flashback to Tony's childhood. Then like Iron Man it would begin in medias res, with Tony crashing in Tennessee before a voice-over that would lead to how he got there, until it got changed to the final version. For the climactic tanker battle, it was originally considered that Brandt would show up in the James Bond tradition of the henchman coming back for the heroes. Instead they chose to use Killian himself, and have Pepper, whom he abused earlier, cause his downfall as a way of poetic justice. The final dialogue was originally written as "I am Tony Stark" to be a response to the first film's ending, but eventually it changed to "I am Iron Man" to enhance the mythical qualities. On setting the film around Christmas, Black said "I think it's a sense of if you're doing something on an interesting scale that involves an entire universe of characters, one way to unite them is to have them all undergo a common experience. There's something at Christmas that unites everybody and it already sets a stage within the stage, that wherever you are, you're experiencing this world together. I think that also there's something just pleasing about it to me." Pearce added that he would have wanted to see a third Iron Man film set at Christmas, adding that "when you're telling a story about taking characters apart, it almost has more resonance if you put it at Christmas and if you're also telling a story about lonelier characters as well. That loneliness is heightened at Christmas". Black also felt the character Harley Keener embodied the Ghost of Christmas Past for Stark.

=== Pre-production ===
In September 2011, Marvel Studios reached an agreement to shoot the film primarily out of EUE/Screen Gems Studios in Wilmington, North Carolina. Michigan was also in contention to land the production, but the Michigan Film Office could not match North Carolina's tax incentives. In April 2012, Ben Kingsley entered into negotiations to play a villain in Iron Man 3, a part which Anthony Mackie, who would later portray Sam Wilson in the MCU, also auditioned for. The following week, producer Kevin Feige revealed that Iron Man 3 would begin shooting in North Carolina "in five weeks," and said that it "is a full-on Tony Stark-centric movie ... very much inspired by the first half of Iron Man ... [H]e's stripped of everything, he's backed up against a wall, and he's gotta use his intelligence to get out of it. He can't call Thor, he can't call Cap, he can't call Nick Fury, and he can't look for the Helicarrier in the sky." A few days later, The Walt Disney Company China, Marvel Studios, and DMG Entertainment announced an agreement to co-produce Iron Man 3 in China. DMG partly financed, produced in China with Marvel, and handled co-production matters. DMG also distributed the film in China in tandem with Disney. DMG had been pitching Marvel Studios on collaboration opportunities to enhance the film for the Chinese market. Initially, they suggested that Harley Keener be a Chinese exchange student, something Marvel Studios co-president Louis D'Esposito shot down since they did not want the film to feature "the sidekick from Indiana Jones [and the Temple of Doom]" (1984). Instead, Feige suggested a doctor named Doctor Wu (in reference to the Steely Dan song) who could remove the shrapnel from Stark's chest. Hong Kong star Andy Lau became involved in negotiations to join the film in that role. Lau would later turn down the role, and Wang Xueqi was cast instead.

The next week, Guy Pearce entered into final talks to play Aldrich Killian, a character who is featured in the "Extremis" comic book story arc. Jessica Chastain entered into discussions for a role in the film, but bowed out due to scheduling conflicts. In May, Rebecca Hall was cast in her place, and her role was described as "a scientist who plays a pivotal role in the creation of a nanotechnology, known as Extremis". Over the next few weeks, James Badge Dale was cast as Eric Savin, Ashley Hamilton was cast as Firepower, and Favreau returned to reprise his role as Happy Hogan from the first two films. Stéphanie Szostak and William Sadler were also cast in the film, with Sadler playing the President of the United States. Despite early reports that Cobie Smulders would reprise her role as Maria Hill from The Avengers in the film, Smulders wrote on her verified Twitter page that this was not true, and the confusion may have been due to the fact that she was filming for Safe Haven, also in North Carolina. According to Drew Pearce, Emilia Clarke was initially cast for an unknown role, before the script was changed.

=== Filming ===
Filming began in Wilmington, North Carolina, on May 23, 2012, at EUE/Screen Gems Studios, with the working title Caged Heat. Cinematographer John Toll opted to work with digital cameras for the first time in his career, as he found them more convenient for a visual effects-heavy production. Toll shot the film primarily on the Arri Alexa camera. From June 4 through June 6, 2012, filming took place in Cary, North Carolina, at the Epic Games headquarters and SAS Institute, with a large Christmas tree set up on the front lawn. A scene was also shot at the Wilmington International Airport. The Port of Wilmington served as a location for the oil tanker in the climactic battle, along with a soundstage recreation of the dock. The crumbling house itself was filmed in a hydraulic-powered giubo platform that could bend and split into two pieces. All the interior footage had practical effects, including debris and explosions, with computer graphics used only to add exteriors and Iron Man's armor.

From July 19 to August 1, 2012, filming took place on Oak Island, North Carolina, to "film aerial drops over the Atlantic Ocean." They were done for the scene where Iron Man rescues the people falling from the Air Force One over Miami, which were originally envisioned done with green screen effects, but were changed to using actual skydivers as second unit director Brian Smrz knew the Red Bull skydiving team. Computer graphics were employed only to add clouds, the destroyed plane and matte paintings of the Florida coastline in the background, replace a stand-in with the Iron Man armor, and some digital compositing to combine different takes of the skydivers together. Filming took place in Rose Hill, North Carolina, in early August 2012, and the town's name was incorporated into the script as the Tennessee city Stark visits. On August 14, actress Dale Dickey said she had been cast in the film, and was currently shooting her scenes. The following day, production was halted when Downey suffered an ankle injury. During the break, Black and Pearce made more script revisions before shooting resumed by August 24.

Cast and crew began arriving in Florida on October 1, to shoot scenes on Dania Beach and around South Florida. That same day, Downey returned to the set after his ankle injury. In early October, scenes were shot at a replica of the Malibu restaurant Neptune's Net, and filming took place on location at the Vizcaya Museum and Gardens. Scenes were shot during the daytime inside the Miami Beach Resort at Miami Beach on October 10 and 11. The production returned to Wilmington in mid-October for additional filming. On November 1, scenes were shot at the Vizcaya Museum and Gardens. Filming in the United States wrapped on November 7 in Wilmington.

Filming began in Beijing, China on December 10. Filming was scheduled to wrap a week later on December 17, 2012. The China filming did not include the main cast and crew. In January 2013, it was reported that a film crew led by Shane Black would begin location scouting in Hyderabad and Bengaluru, India between January 20 and 24. Also in January, Cheadle confirmed that re-shooting was taking place in Manhattan Beach. Shooting also took place on the week of January 23, 2013, at TCL Chinese Theatre in Hollywood. A major part of the content filmed in the reshoots regarded the Mandarin, with Drew Pearce saying that in early cuts, the character "didn't feel real enough—there wasn't a sense of him being [part of] the real world, mostly because he was just looking down a lens and threatening the world." A report on actual production costs for films from FilmL.A. Inc., indicated a gross budget of $200 million, with a net of $178.4 million for Iron Man 3 after tax incentives from North Carolina and Florida.

=== Post-production ===
Previsualization of the Mark 42 armor (top) and the completed shot (bottom)

Chris Townsend served as visual effects supervisor for the film, which featured over 2,000 visual effects shots and was worked on by 17 studios, including Weta Digital, Digital Domain, Scanline VFX, Trixter, Framestore, Luma Pictures, Fuel VFX, Cantina Creative, Cinesite, The Embassy Visual Effects, Lola Visual Effects, Capital T, Prologue and Rise FX. Townsend said that from January 2013 through the end of filming in April, the collective crew had one day of downtime, otherwise working seven days a week and 14 to 18 hours a day.

Digital Domain, Scanline VFX and Trixter each worked on separate shots featuring the Mark 42 armor, working with different digital models. The studios shared some of their files to ensure consistency between the shots. For the Mark 42 and Iron Patriot armors, Legacy Effects constructed partial suits that were worn on set. Townsend explained that "Invariably we'd shoot a soft-suit with Robert then we'd also put tracking markers on his trousers. He would also wear lifts in his shoes or be up in a box so he'd be the correct height—Iron Man is 6'5". During shooting we used multiple witness cams, Canon C300s, and we had two or three running whenever there was an Iron Man or Extremis character." The artists studied time lapse photography of decaying fruit and vegetables and actual phenomena such as the aurora borealis as reference for the effect of the glowing Extremis characters. The heads-up display features of the helmet were inspired by visualization techniques from MRI diagnostic pattern recognition and graph theory, particularly by the connectogram, a circular graph that maps all of the white-matter connections of the human brain.

The film's production was delayed following Downey's leg injury, and for certain shots they were forced to create a double for Downey. Townsend explained that "The collective VFX [supervisors] and unit leads ran into a room as soon as the incident happened to try to ascertain what sequences could they shoot." Certain shots were filmed with a body double on set, and Weta Digital created a digital body double for others.

A total of three hours and 15 minutes of footage were shot before editing, where it was brought down to 130 minutes (119 without the credits), marking the longest stand-alone Iron Man film. Post-production also had a 3D conversion and a digital remaster for the IMAX release. Todd-AO mixed the sound in Dolby Atmos to enhance the immersive experience. Trevor Slattery was originally meant to die in the film, appearing during the climatic oil rig battle with an Extremis injector and promptly blowing up after taking it. Pearce said that was "the most Monty Python of all of the beats" in the film. During the editing process, it was determined to keep Slattery alive, with new material shot during the reshoots to accommodate this.

== Music ==
The film is scored by Brian Tyler, who signed on in October 2012. According to Tyler, he was approached more for his "thematic" scores such as The Greatest Game Ever Played, Annapolis, and Partition rather than his "modern" action scores such as The Fast and Furious films, with Kevin Feige asking for a theme that was recognizable and featured those dramatic tones. To employ the "deeply thematic component with a strong melody," the score employs mostly orchestra sounds. The main theme for Iron Man focuses on horns and trumpets, to be "both a march and anthem." Tyler mentioned that John Williams' work on Raiders of the Lost Ark was the first thing he thought of as an influence, and the cue for the Well of Souls in Raiders influenced the Extremis motif, as Tyler felt it should enhance a spiritual side for having a "technology so advanced that nears magic." Echoing the Mandarin's amalgamated personality, his theme was religious music "that borrows from many cultures," from "Monastic, Gothic, and Christian chants to music from the Middle-East." The score was recorded with the London Philharmonic Orchestra at Abbey Road Studios.

Along with Tyler's soundtrack album, Hollywood Records released a concept album inspired by the film, Heroes Fall. It features twelve original alternative rock and indie rock songs, with only one appearing in the film itself, Awolnation's "Some Kind of Joke."

== Marketing ==
In July 2012, at San Diego Comic-Con, a new Iron Man armor from the film, the Mark XLII, was on display on the convention floor, along with the Marks I-VII from the first two Iron Man films and The Avengers. A panel was held, during which Shane Black, Robert Downey Jr., Don Cheadle, Jon Favreau and Kevin Feige discussed making the film, and several minutes of footage from the film were shown. The first television advertisement aired during Super Bowl XLVII on the CBS network in the United States. On March 25, 2013, Marvel and Disney revealed on the official Iron Man Facebook page, "Iron Man 3: Armor Unlock," to reveal suits Stark has made before the events of the film. In January 2013, Marvel Comics released a two-issue comic book prelude by writers Christos Gage and Will Corona Pilgrim with art by Steve Kurth and Drew Geraci. The story set between the second and third Iron Man films centers on War Machine, revealing why he was absent during the battle in New York of The Avengers.

Like with the first two films, Audi again provided product placement with various vehicles. Oracle also returned from Iron Man 2, showcasing both the Oracle Cloud and the Oracle Exadata server. Verizon FiOS and TCL's flat panel televisions and Alcatel One Touch smartphones are also featured in the film, and the Chinese cut also shows a Zoomlion crane and Yili milk. Promotional deals were arranged with Subway and the Schwan Food Company, and tie-ins included Lego sets, Hasbro action figures, and a mobile phone game by Gameloft.

Disney also promoted the film at its domestic theme parks. Disneyland's Innoventions attraction received a Stark Industries exhibit beginning April 13, and Monorail Black of the Walt Disney World Monorail System was given an exterior Iron Man scheme. The exhibit, entitled Iron Man Tech Presented by Stark Industries, features the same armor display that was shown at the 2012 San Diego Comic-Con, with the Marks I-VII and the new Mark XLII. In addition, there is a simulator game, titled "Become Iron Man," that uses Kinect-like technology to allow the viewer to be encased in an animated Mark XLII armor and take part in a series of "tests," in which you fire repulsor rays and fly through Tony Stark's workshop. The game is guided by J.A.R.V.I.S., who is voiced again by Paul Bettany. The exhibit also has smaller displays that include helmets and chest pieces from the earlier films and the gauntlet and boot from an action sequence in Iron Man 3. All-in-all, Disney spent $131 million marketing the film worldwide.

== Release ==
=== Theatrical ===
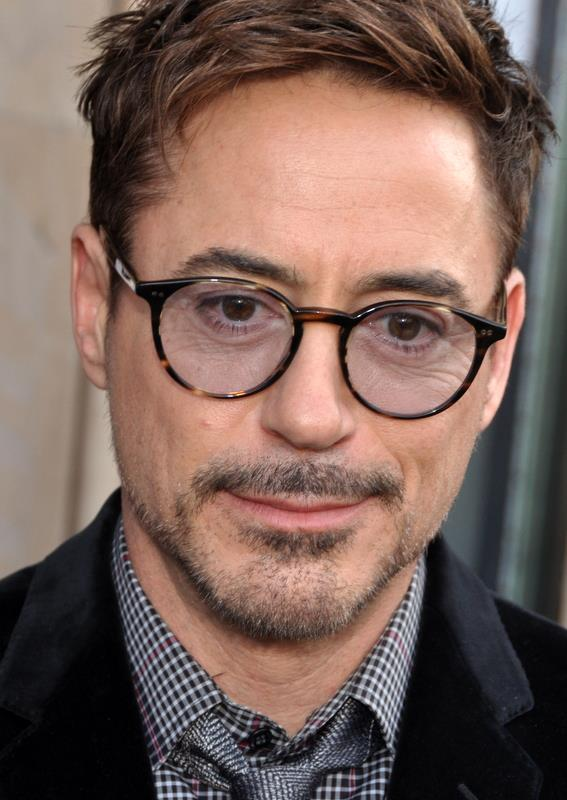
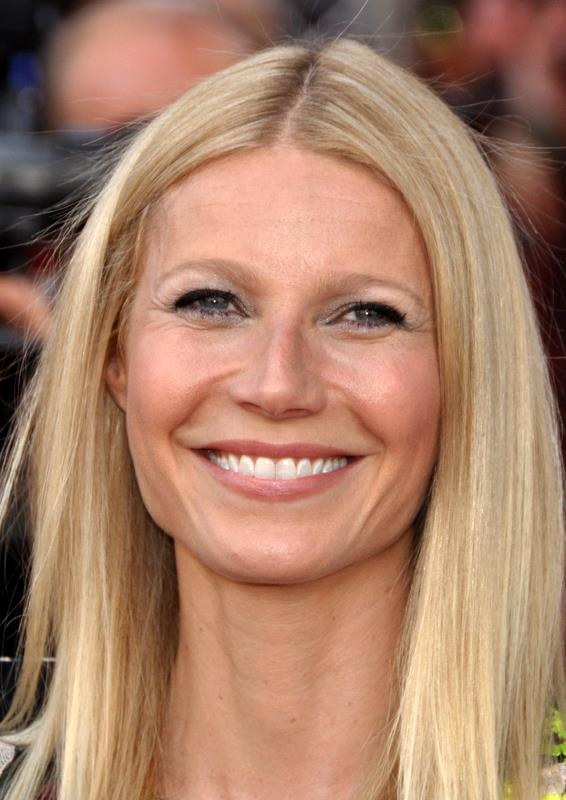
Robert Downey Jr. and Gwyneth Paltrow in Paris at the film's French premiere at the Grand Rex, April 2013

Iron Man 3 was distributed worldwide by Walt Disney Studios Motion Pictures with the exception of China, where it was released by DMG Entertainment, and Germany and Austria, where it was released by Tele München Group. The Chinese version of the film offers specially prepared bonus footage made exclusively for the Chinese audience. This version features a four-minute longer cut of the film, featuring product placement for various Chinese products, as well as an extended scene of Dr. Wu preparing to operate on Stark with his unnamed assistant played by Fan Bingbing. The film was titled onscreen as Iron Man Three.

The film's premiere happened at the Grand Rex in Paris, on April 14, 2013, with Robert Downey Jr. and Gwyneth Paltrow in attendance. While the UK premiere of the film was originally set for April 17, the funeral of former British Prime Minister Margaret Thatcher taking place in that date made the event be pushed to the following day. Downey, Ben Kingsley and Rebecca Hall were present for the advance screening at London's Odeon Leicester Square. The El Capitan Theatre in Hollywood, Los Angeles, hosted the United States premiere of Iron Man 3 on April 24. The film opened in 46 countries through April 22–24, with the United States release, on 4,253 screens, happening one week later. Regal Cinemas, AMC Theatres and Carmike Cinemas put presale tickets on hold, two weeks before the U.S. premiere. The cinemas were in a contract dispute with Disney, who wished to receive more of the ticket sale profit than they currently did, largely based on the projected premiere-weekend intake Iron Man 3 was expected to have. Carmike was the first to come to terms with Disney. It was later reported that Cinemark Theatres had also stopped selling presale tickets, and Regal Cinemas had removed all marketing material for the film from its locations. On April 25, 2013, Regal, AMC and Disney ended their dispute, which allowed Regal and AMC to proceed with selling presale tickets again.

IMAX screenings began on April 25, 2013, internationally and May 3 in the United States. The film was shown in the 4DX format, featuring strobe lights, tilting seats, blowing wind and fog and odor effects in selected countries. In Japan, the technology opened its first room at the Korona World theater in Nagoya, Japan with the release of the film. Iron Man 3 was the first film released in Phase Two of the MCU.

=== Home media ===
Iron Man 3 was released by Walt Disney Studios Home Entertainment in digital download form on September 3, 2013. This was followed by the film's release on Blu-ray, 3D Blu-ray, DVD, digital copy, and on demand on September 24, 2013. The home video release includes a Marvel One-Shot short film titled Agent Carter starring Hayley Atwell as Peggy Carter from Captain America: The First Avenger. It debuted atop the DVD and Blu-ray charts in the United States, and second in the rental charts behind World War Z. Iron Man 3 has earned more than $82 million in home media sales in the U.S.

The film was also collected in a 13-disc box set titled "Marvel Cinematic Universe: Phase Two Collection", which includes all of the Phase Two films in the Marvel Cinematic Universe. It was released on December 8, 2015.

== Reception ==
=== Box office ===
Iron Man 3 grossed $409 million in North America and $857.1 million in other countries for a worldwide total of $1.266 billion, outgrossing both of its predecessors combined. Worldwide, it became the fifth-highest-grossing film, the second-highest-grossing film of 2013, the second-highest-grossing film of the Marvel Cinematic Universe (behind Marvel's The Avengers), and the highest-grossing film of the Iron Man film series, as well as the fourth-highest-grossing comic-book and superhero film overall. It achieved the sixth-largest worldwide opening weekend with $372.5 million. On the weekend of May 3–5, 2013, the film set a record for the largest worldwide weekend in IMAX with $28.6 million. On its 23rd day in theaters, Iron Man 3 became the sixth Disney film and the 16th film overall to reach $1 billion. It is the first Iron Man film to gross over $1 billion, becoming the second Marvel film to do so after The Avengers, and was the fourth-fastest film to reach the milestone. As part of the earlier distribution agreement made with Disney in 2010, Paramount Pictures received 9% of the box office gross generated by Iron Man 3. Deadline Hollywood calculated the film's net profit as $391.8 million, when factoring together all expenses and revenues for the film.

By the end of its opening day, Iron Man 3 made $68.9 million (including $15.6 million from late Thursday shows), achieving the seventh-highest-grossing opening day. By the end of its opening weekend, the film earned $174.1 million, making it the second-highest opening weekend of all time, behind The Avengers. Of the opening-weekend audience, 55% was over 25 years old, and 61% were males, while only 45% of the gross originated from 3-D screenings. Opening-weekend earnings from IMAX amounted to $16.5 million. It topped the box office during two consecutive weekends and achieved the fourth-largest second-weekend gross with $72.5 million.

The film earned $13.2 million on its opening day (Wednesday, April 24, 2013) from 12 countries. Through Sunday, April 28, it earned a five-day opening weekend of $198.4 million from 42 countries. The film's opening-weekend gross included $7.1 million from IMAX venues. It set opening-day records in the Philippines (surpassed by Man of Steel), Taiwan, Singapore, Vietnam, Malaysia, China, Ukraine, Russia and the CIS, both single- and opening-day records in Thailand and South Africa, as well as a single-day record in Hong Kong. It also scored the second-biggest opening day in Argentina, only behind Harry Potter and the Deathly Hallows – Part 2. The film set opening-weekend records in the Asia Pacific region, in Latin America, and in individual countries including Argentina (first surpassed by Fast & Furious 6, when including weekday previews), Ecuador, Hong Kong, Indonesia, Vietnam, Taiwan, the Philippines, Malaysia, Singapore, Thailand, South Africa, and the United Arab Emirates. It also achieved the second-largest opening weekend in Mexico, Brazil, and Russia and the CIS. In India, it had the second-best opening weekend for a Hollywood film, after The Amazing Spider-Man. IMAX opening-weekend records were set in Taiwan, the Netherlands, Brazil, and the Philippines. It is the highest-grossing film in Indonesia, Malaysia, and Vietnam and the second-highest-grossing film in Singapore and the Philippines, behind The Avengers. It topped the weekend box office outside North America three consecutive times.

In China, where part of the production took place, the film set a midnight-showings record with $2.1 million, as well as single-day and opening-day records with $21.5 million (on its opening day). Through its first Sunday, the film earned an opening-weekend total of $64.1 million, making China's opening the largest for the film, followed by a $23.1 million opening in Russia and the CIS, and a $21.2 million opening in the UK, Ireland and Malta. With total earnings reaching $124 million, it was the highest-grossing American film in China in 2013, and the country is the film's highest-grossing market after North America, followed by South Korea ($64.2 million) and the UK, Ireland, and Malta ($57.1 million).

=== Critical response ===
The review aggregator Rotten Tomatoes reported an approval rating of 79%, with an average score of 7/10, based on 327 reviews. The website's critical consensus reads, "With the help of its charismatic lead, some impressive action sequences, and even a few surprises, Iron Man 3 is a witty, entertaining adventure and a strong addition to the Marvel canon." Metacritic gave a weighted average score of 62 out of 100, based on 44 critics, indicating "generally favorable" reviews. Audiences polled by CinemaScore gave the film an average grade of "A" on an A+ to F scale, the same score as both its predecessors.

In an early review by the trade magazine The Hollywood Reporter, Todd McCarthy said that, "After nearly crashing and burning on his last solo flight in 2010, Iron Man returns refreshed and ready for action in this spirited third installment ... [that] benefits immeasurably from the irreverent quicksilver humor of co-writer and director Shane Black. Calling the film "darker and more serious than its predecessors," Kenneth Turan of the Los Angeles Times credited Black for "chang[ing] this billion-dollar-plus franchise's tone for the better while keeping the same actor as Tony Stark. ... There is quite a bit of Black's trademark attitude and humor here as well, things like a throwaway reference to the sci-fi classic Westworld and a goofy character who has Tony Stark's likeness tattooed on his forearm. Black and company throw all kinds of stuff at the audience, and though it doesn't all work, a lot of it does and the attempt to be different and create unguessable twists is always appreciated." Rafer Guzman of Newsday characterized Iron Man as "the anti-Batman, all zip and zingers. He's also, suddenly, rather family-friendly. Some of the movie's best moments are shared by Stark and latchkey kid Harley (Ty Simpkins), who mock their budding father-son relationship while acting it out." Psychology Today concluded that the film presented an accurate portrayal of Tony Stark's posttraumatic stress disorder symptoms. Michael Arbeiter of Hollywood.com praised the film as "Marvel's First True Action-Comedy", commenting that "Tony's camaraderie with preteen tech geek Harley Keener is one gigantic superhero/'90s-kid-sidekick laugh riot (the friggin' kid's name is Harley Keener ... is there anything more '90s-kid-sidekick-sounding than that?!)."

Nick De Semlyen of the UK film magazine Empire had criticisms, even while giving the film four of five stars. Finding it "a swinging caper with wit, balls, heart and exploding baubles," he said the villainous "super-soldiers who can regenerate body parts and survive astounding damage [are] visually interesting ... but their motivation is murky and unconvincing." Likewise Joshua Rothkopf of Time Out New York bestowed 3 of 5 stars, saying, "Black has massively upped the verbal sparring and kept the broad inventiveness of comic-book malleability in mind. ... The most wonderful of Black's surprises harkens back to his '80s reputation for character revision and is simply too good to ruin here." But, he asked, "[W]hy, finally, are we down at the docks—in the dark, no less—for one of those lumbering climaxes involving swinging shipping cranes? The energy bleeds out of the film; it's as if the producers were scared the crowd would riot over not enough digital fakeness."

Reacting more negatively, Stephen Whitty of The Star-Ledger found the film "slickly enjoyable" for the visual effects, but said, "[T]here's something empty about the film. Like Tony's suits, it's shiny and polished. But this time, there's nobody inside ... This movie has neither the emotionalism of the first film, nor the flashy villains of the second ... Tony's relationship with girlfriend Pepper Potts is in inexplicable jeopardy—and then simply fixes itself. A supposedly cute kid sidekick—a true sign of authorial desperation—is introduced, and then dropped." Michael Phillips of the Chicago Tribune echoed this, saying, "[I]n a gleefully cynical bid for a preteen audience (a few years too young for the violence in Iron Man 3, I'd say), Stark befriends a bullied 8-year-old [sic] (Ty Simpkins) who becomes his tag-along and sometime savior ... Stark no longer needs to be in the Iron Man suit. He's able to operate the thing remotely when needed. The movie's like that too. It's decent superhero blockbustering, but rather remote and vaguely secondhand. At this point, even with Black's flashes of black humor, the machinery is more or less taking care of itself, offering roughly half of the genial wit and enjoyment of the first Iron Man."

=== Accolades ===
Accolades received by Iron Man 3
Award	Date of ceremony	Category	Recipient(s)	Result	Ref.
Academy Awards	March 2, 2014	Best Visual Effects	Christopher Townsend, Guy Williams, Erik Nash, and Dan Sudick	Nominated	
BMI Film & TV Awards	May 15, 2013	BMI Film Music Awards	Brian Tyler (Note: Also for The Expendables 2 (2012) and the television series Hawaii Five-0)	Won	
British Academy Children's Awards	November 24, 2013	Kid's Vote — Film	Iron Man 3	Nominated	
British Academy Film Awards	February 16, 2014	Best Special Visual Effects	Bryan Grill, Christopher Townsend, Guy Williams, and Dan Sudick	Nominated	
Cinema Audio Society Awards	February 22, 2014	Outstanding Achievement in Sound Mixing for a Motion Picture – Live Action	Jose Antonio Garcia, Michael Prestwood Smith, Michael Keller, Joel Iwataki, Gregory Steele, and James Ashwill	Nominated	
Critics' Choice Movie Awards	January 16, 2014	Best Action Movie	Iron Man 3	Nominated	
Critics' Choice Movie Awards	January 16, 2014	Best Actor in an Action Movie	Robert Downey Jr.	Nominated	
Critics' Choice Movie Awards	January 16, 2014	Best Actress in an Action Movie	Gwyneth Paltrow	Nominated	
Critics' Choice Movie Awards	January 16, 2014	Best Visual Effects	Iron Man 3	Nominated	
ETC Bollywood Business Awards	January 20, 2014	Most Successful Foreign Film	Iron Man 3	Won	
Golden Reel Awards	February 16, 2014	Outstanding Achievement in Sound Editing – Sound Effects and Foley for Feature Film	Mark Stoeckinger and Andrew DeCristofaro	Nominated	
Golden Trailer Awards	May 3, 2013	Best Action	"Not Afraid" (Trailer Park, Inc.)	Won	
Golden Trailer Awards	May 3, 2013	Best Fantasy Adventure Poster	"Not Afraid" (Trailer Park, Inc.)	Nominated	
Golden Trailer Awards	May 3, 2013	Best Sound Editing	"Not Afraid" (Trailer Park, Inc.)	Nominated	
Golden Trailer Awards	May 3, 2013	Best Summer Blockbuster 2013 TV Spot	"Escape" (MOCEAN)	Nominated	
Guild of Music Supervisors Awards	February 26, 2014	Best Film Studio Music Department	Walt Disney Studios Motion Pictures (Note: Also for the studio's 2013 films Frozen, The Lone Ranger, Monsters University, Oz the Great and Powerful, Saving Mr. Banks, and Thor: The Dark World)	Nominated	
Hollywood Film Awards	October 21, 2013	Hollywood Movie Award	Iron Man 3	Nominated	
Hollywood Post Alliance Awards	November 7, 2013	Outstanding Color Grading – Feature Film	Steven J. Scott	Nominated	
Hollywood Post Alliance Awards	November 7, 2013	Outstanding Sound – Feature Film	Mark Stoeckinger, Michael Keller, Mike Prestwood Smith, and Andrew DeCristofaro	Nominated	
Hollywood Post Alliance Awards	November 7, 2013	Outstanding Visual Effects – Feature Film	Guy Williams, Aaron Gilman, Matt Aitken, Dan Macarin, and Thrain Shadbolt	Nominated	
Hugo Awards	August 17, 2014	Best Dramatic Presentation, Long Form	Drew Pearce and Shane Black	Nominated	
International Film Music Critics Association Awards	February 20, 2014	Best Original Score for an Action/Adventure/Thriller Film	Brian Tyler	Nominated	
Location Managers Guild Awards	March 29, 2014	Outstanding Achievement by a Location Professional – Feature Film	Ilt Jones	Won	
MTV Movie Awards	April 13, 2014	Best Cameo	Joan Rivers	Nominated	
MTV Movie Awards	April 13, 2014	Best Hero	Robert Downey Jr.	Nominated	
Movieguide Awards	February 7, 2014	Best Movie for Mature Audiences	Iron Man 3	Won	
Movieguide Awards	February 7, 2014	Faith and Freedom Award for Movies	Iron Man 3	Won	
Nickelodeon Kids' Choice Awards	March 29, 2014	Favorite Movie	Iron Man 3	Nominated	
Nickelodeon Kids' Choice Awards	March 29, 2014	Favorite Buttkicker	Robert Downey Jr.	Won	
Nickelodeon Kids' Choice Awards	March 29, 2014	Favorite Movie Actor	Robert Downey Jr.	Nominated	
People's Choice Awards	January 8, 2014	Favorite Movie	Iron Man 3	Won	
People's Choice Awards	January 8, 2014	Favorite Movie Actor	Robert Downey Jr.	Nominated	
People's Choice Awards	January 8, 2014	Favorite Movie Actress	Gwyneth Paltrow	Nominated	
People's Choice Awards	January 8, 2014	Favorite Movie Duo	Robert Downey Jr. and Gwyneth Paltrow	Nominated	
People's Choice Awards	January 8, 2014	Favorite Action Movie	Iron Man 3	Won	
People's Choice Awards	January 8, 2014	Favorite Action Movie Star	Robert Downey Jr.	Won	
Saturn Awards	June 26, 2014	Best Comic-to-Film Motion Picture	Iron Man 3	Won	
Saturn Awards	June 26, 2014	Best Actor	Robert Downey Jr.	Won	
Saturn Awards	June 26, 2014	Best Supporting Actor	Ben Kingsley	Won	
Saturn Awards	June 26, 2014	Best Performance by a Younger Actor	Ty Simpkins	Nominated	
Saturn Awards	June 26, 2014	Best Music	Brian Tyler	Nominated	
St. Louis Gateway Film Critics Association Awards	December 14, 2013	Best Visual Effects	Iron Man 3	Nominated	
Teen Choice Awards	August 11, 2013	Choice Movie: Action	Iron Man 3	Won	
Teen Choice Awards	August 11, 2013	Choice Movie Actor: Action	Robert Downey Jr.	Won	
Teen Choice Awards	August 11, 2013	Choice Movie Actress: Action	Gwyneth Paltrow	Nominated	
Teen Choice Awards	August 11, 2013	Choice Movie: Sci-Fi/Fantasy	Iron Man 3	Nominated	
Teen Choice Awards	August 11, 2013	Choice Movie Actor: Sci-Fi/Fantasy	Robert Downey Jr.	Nominated	
Teen Choice Awards	August 11, 2013	Choice Movie Actress: Sci-Fi/Fantasy	Gwyneth Paltrow	Nominated	
Teen Choice Awards	August 11, 2013	Choice Movie: Villain	Ben Kingsley	Nominated	
Teen Choice Awards	August 11, 2013	Choice Movie: Chemistry	Don Cheadle and Robert Downey Jr.	Nominated	
Visual Effects Society Awards	February 12, 2014	Outstanding Visual Effects in a Visual Effects Driven Feature Motion Picture	Christopher Townsend, Mark Soper, Guy Williams, and Bryan Grill	Nominated	
Visual Effects Society Awards	February 12, 2014	Outstanding Created Environment in a Live Action Feature Motion Picture	John Stevenson-Galvin, Greg Notzelman, Paul Harris, and Justin Stockton for "Shipyard"	Nominated	
Visual Effects Society Awards	February 12, 2014	Outstanding Virtual Cinematography in a Live Action Feature Motion Picture	Mark Smith, Aaron Gilman, Thelvin Cabezas, and Gerardo Ramirez	Nominated	
Visual Effects Society Awards	February 12, 2014	Outstanding Compositing in a Feature Motion Picture	Michael Maloney, Francis Puthanangadi, Justin Van Der Lek, and Howard Cabalfin for "Barrel of Monkeys"	Nominated	
Visual Effects Society Awards	February 12, 2014	Outstanding Compositing in a Feature Motion Picture	Darren Poe, Stefano Trivelli, Josiah Howison, and Zach Zaubi for "House Attack"	Nominated	

== Themes and analysis ==
Iron Man 3 focuses on contemporary U.S. foreign policy and its consequences. Like the first Iron Man film, it is about the military industrial complex. The main antagonist, Killian, tries to take over the U.S. government and capitalize on the war on terror with a decoy villain actor, the Mandarin; the supposed looming menace distracts the public from Killian's actions with a narrative of the constant threat that also makes the war profitable. Using Stark as a metaphor of American society, Charlie Jane Anders of Gizmodo notes that the film differs in the portrayal of the country from the previous two entries; whereas the previous films were about the guilt of ruining areas in foreign countries, Iron Man 3 is about the feeling of powerlessness, in that a trusted, wealthy and individualistic celebrity like Stark is unable to find a powerful terrorist such as the Mandarin.

The Mandarin, a cover-up adversary that is otherwise non-threatening, is a take on Americans' xenophobia towards Middle Easterns, and how people's fear is taken advantage of to create and pass harmful policies. The Mandarin's characteristics are what the population expects from a terrorist, such as a large beard, army pants, and comments he gives to the media that condemn the US. The twist that the Mandarin is fake also plays on audiences' availability heuristics that make them think if someone is a danger or not.

Iron Man 3 is part of a trend in post-9/11 superhero films consisting of vulnerable, weak superheroes and complex antagonists with realistic motivations. Psychologist and author Dr. Travis Langley believed Stark meets all of the Diagnostic and Statistical Manual of Mental Disorders's criteria for post-traumatic stress disorder, and Stark, like those with PTSD in real-life, denies he could have it. Stark enacts its symptoms, such as anxiety attacks, hypervigilance, frequent nightmares, and an inability to be in the public; this deviates from most portrayals of not only superheroes but also strong male leads in general, where they are not traumatized from perilous situations.

== Future ==
=== Potential sequel ===
In March 2013, Black stated that Downey's original contract with Marvel Studios, which expired after the release of Iron Man 3, might be extended in order for the actor to appear in a second Avengers film and at least another Iron Man film. That April, Cheadle said that Iron Man 3 could be the final film in the series, but acknowledged that he was open to reprise in further Iron Man films or other MCU projects. Although Downey said in 2014 that there was no plan for a fourth Iron Man film, he later stated that he was open to reprise his role. Tony Stark is killed off in the film Avengers: Endgame (2019), with co-screenwriter Stephen McFeely commenting, "You would've already had Iron Man 4 if it was any other studio", remarking that it was a bold move by Marvel to approve Tony's death.

=== Marvel One-Shot ===
In February 2014, Marvel released the One-Shot film, All Hail the King, on Thor: The Dark World's (2013) home media, featuring Kingsley reprising his role as Trevor Slattery. It continues Slattery's story from the end of the film, revealing that the real Mandarin actually exists in the MCU.

== See also ==
- List of films featuring powered exoskeletons
