= The Lost Homestead =

2020 non-fiction book by Marina Wheeler

The Lost Homestead: My Mother, Partition and the Punjab
- Author: Marina Wheeler
- Language: English
- Published: 2020
- Publisher: Hodder & Stoughton
- Pages: 328
- ISBN: 978-1-4736-7774-6

The Lost Homestead: My Mother, Partition and the Punjab is a book by Marina Wheeler, published by Hodder & Stoughton in 2020. It focusses on the author's Sikh mother, Kuldip Singh, known as Dip, and traces her life through the partition of India in 1947 and her life with the British journalist and broadcaster, Charles Wheeler.

The title of the book refers to Dip’s palatial childhood home in Sargodha, Lahore, then in British India, now in Pakistan, from which her family had to flee before settling in Delhi, when Dip was in her teens. The effects of partition caused her father to instruct the family to forget the life they previously had. At the age of 17, by family arrangement, she was married into an eminent and wealthy family. After walking out of the marriage she supported herself at first in Bombay and then in Delhi, where she met the then BBC Delhi-based South Asia correspondent, Charles Wheeler. They married and for a short while lived in Berlin, where they had two daughters. From 1965 to 1973, they lived mostly in Washington. Later, they would settle in Sussex, England, and Dip would train and work for Amnesty International. After 1972, she never returned to India.

Wheeler visits India and Pakistan to trace her mother's story. On completing her research, Dip suggested that the title of the book be From Sargodha to Sussex, as she saw the paradise she lost in Sargodha regained in Sussex. Interspersed in the story of her mother, Wheeler inserts historical context. Among the memoirs in the book include early memories of being in Sargodha, meeting India's first Prime Minister in 1948, reading P. G. Wodehouse, seeing falling snow for the first time in Berlin, and an incident with ketchup, among others.

The book was generally well received in India. The Wire questioned some of the historical interpretations and the absence of other relevant historical detail. However, it felt that these were overshadowed by the personal story, a feature also pointed by the Financial Times. The Telegraph wrote that the book had little of Wheeler's private life, but it was a story worth telling, and The Hindu noted that the book had brought to the forefront the life of someone living on the sidelines.

It was shortlisted for the 2021 RSL Christopher Bland Prize.

== Background ==
The Lost Homestead examines the memoirs of Kuldip Singh, affectionately known as Dip (pronounced deep) or nani to her grandchildren, the wife of Charles Wheeler and the mother of Marina Wheeler, a barrister who was appointed QC in 2016 and who researched and wrote the book. The title of the book refers to Dip’s childhood home in the Civil Lines of Sargodha, Punjab before the partition of India in 1947. "It is also my story", says Wheeler in the prologue. The idea for writing it came from a publisher who read her review of Gurinder Chadha's film Viceroy's House in 2017, which depicted Britain's plans to partition India. In order to trace her maternal family’s life, and explain it in a historical context, she subsequently spent two years questioning her mother and conducting her own research through books, libraries, archives and visits to India and Pakistan, where she was assisted by relatives, friends and several academics.

== Publication history ==
The book was first published in hardback by Hodder & Stoughton on 12 November 2020. It was released as paperback in 2021. There is an electronic version, and the audible version is narrated by Wheeler herself, who also holds the copyright. The front cover of the book depicts a photograph taken in 1968 at Golf Links, New Delhi, Wheeler's grandparent's home after India's independence. Charles Wheeler stands at the top centre with Dip, her sisters Amarjit and Anup, and brother Priti. Wheeler's sister Shirin is sitting on her grandmother's knee and Marina Wheeler on her grandfather's. The prologue is followed by six parts covering 15 chapters, an epilogue and an index. There are no references, footnotes or bibliography. There are 16 pages of photographs including Dip's portrait by M. F. Husain, her first marriage at age 17, her marriage to Charles Wheeler in 1962, her father's OBE decoration and several other family photographs.

== Summary ==
Wheeler documents Dip's memories, narrates her story in chronological order, fills in gaps after interviewing relevant academics, friends and relatives, and adds her own researched historical context, revealing at each stage where she got the information from.

=== Sequence of events ===
Dip's father, Harbans Singh, referred to as Papa-ji, features early in part one of the book. During the early twentieth century he was a doctor and well-off land-owner in Sargodha, Lahore, then in British India, now in Pakistan. Dip, born in Sargodha, described the family home at this time as "paradise". It was a large mansion with external verandahs in the British style, complete with orchards and gardens. They had servants and her family's importance of education meant that she attended a school where she was taught in English and Urdu. During the partition of India in 1947 and early post-independence years, when Dip was in her teens, the family found themselves concerned with the illness of Dip's older brother, and simultaneously became displaced in Delhi, as Sargodha became part of Pakistan. The effects of partition caused her father to instruct the family to forget the life they previously had. Part two covers the immediate post-independence of India. In the early years Dip attended at first Indraprastha College for Women before transferring to Lady Irwin College. At the age of 17, by family arrangement, she married Daljit, son of Sir Sobha Singh, the contractor who built much of New Delhi, and brother of Khushwant Singh. Unable to probe her into revealing more detail, Wheeler discovers from another relative that one day Dip packed a suitcase and just walked out. She supported herself working at first in Bombay and then at Canada House in Delhi. In 1960, she met Charles Wheeler, the BBC's Delhi-based South Asia correspondent. They married in 1962.

Part three begins with Dip's departure from India in 1962 and settlement in Berlin, where she gave birth to their two daughters, and from where she took British nationality. From 1965 to 1973, they lived mostly in Washington, where Charles at first covered the Los Angeles riots and later Watergate. A day prior to returning to England on the SS France she cut her long hair. After the post in Washington, the family lived for a short while in Brussels. Eventually, they would settle in Sussex, England, and Dip would train and work for Amnesty International. Part four covers the few trips back to India between 1963 and 1972 and here she describes the members of her extended Indian family, several of who have been in close contact throughout her life. Two trips to Sargodha in Pakistan in search for Dip's childhood home are described in part five. There she discovers the house no longer exists. Upon returning to India, Wheeler recounts some of the testimonies of residents of Sargodha of 1947, held in the National Archives in Delhi. Part six returns to Sussex and Dip's suggestion that the title of the book be From Sargodha to Sussex, as she saw the paradise she lost in Sargodha regained in her Sussex cottage. Dip's last days and death in early 2020, are described in the epilogue. Her ashes were buried by her daughters and grandchildren in her Sussex garden.

=== Historical context ===
Interspersed in the story of her mother, Wheeler inserts historical context and her own feelings. The family home in Sarghoda was built among the Punjab Canal Colonies north west of Lahore. For his efforts in recruiting Punjabi men for the First World War and for attending to the sick during the influenza epidemic of 1918, the British had rewarded Papa-ji with sanads, deeds confirming his allegiance to them. He later received an OBE for his service during the 1919 campaign in Afghanistan. In the following years leading to 1947, his children, nephews and nieces, did not share all his views, and some would be involved in freedom campaigns. Here she places the significance of the Sikhs in the British Indian Army, Unionist rule and the rise of nationalist politics with the Indian National Congress and All-India Muslim League. She links her family's political connection to Papa-ji's cousin, Ujjal Singh , clarifies Sir Sobha Singh's association with Bhagat Singh and reads Kim A. Wagner's Amritsar 1919 and Anita Anand's The Patient Assassin to give her interpretation of the massacre at Jallianwala Bagh and Udham Singh, respectively. Among the historical themes and topics she writes about are Subhas Chandra Bose, the Radcliffe Line, China–India relations, Operation Blue Star, and the 1984 anti-Sikh riots.

=== Selected memoirs ===
With reference to the massacre at Amritsar in 1919, Dip did not recall hearing that news at that time. Early memories included receiving a bicycle as a gift and sitting in front of fires eating nuts with family in their mansion home. Memories of the late 1940s concentrate on her unwell brother Bakshi, who died from tuberculosis in his early 20s. Exactly how Dip arrived at Delhi is not clear in her memory. In the early post-independence years, Dip tells of being in Delhi at the time of the assassination of Mahatma Gandhi, and the reaction to finding out that the assassin was Hindu. She enjoyed reading and hid under covers to read P. G. Wodehouse and enjoyed Bertie Wooster and Jeeves. At age 16, from Lady Irwin College, she was one of six girls to present a garland to then prime minister Jawaharlal Nehru on his birthday. Wheeler calls this memory one her personal favourites. After it was pointed out by her teacher that it was also Dip's birthday, Nehru in return removed one garland and put it on Dip. Dip tells Wheeler that she did not remember her wedding day at age 17 and that any memories of that marriage were "buried". She remembers being secretly painted by the famous artist M. F. Husain. Another memory was that of sleeping in Jinnah's old bedroom in the house on Aurangzeb Road where he lived before leaving India. Later, in Berlin, several stories are recounted including that of seeing falling snow for the first time, and being in the city when John F. Kennedy visited. During their life in Washington, Wheeler and Dip recounted a game at supper where Dip squirted ketchup on Charles's head after he said she was best at cleaning the lavatory.

== Reception ==
The book was generally well received in India. The Wire questioned some of the historical interpretations and the absence of other relevant historical detail. It was surprised that Viceroy’s House was felt by Wheeler to be a reliable source of Indian history. It commented on the omission of her own marriage in the book. Regarding historical facts and analyses, the magazine felt Wheeler not at fault, but those who checked the text, and any inaccuracies were overshadowed by the personal story. The Telegraph felt that the beginning of the book reflected Wheeler's unfamiliarity with what is a new way of writing for her. It noted that the book had little of her private life, but it was a story worth telling. The Hindu noted that the book had brought to the forefront the life of someone living on the sidelines, and in the process, helped Wheeler appraise her own life. In the Financial Times the personal narrative was reiterated..."Wheeler taps a rich vein of personal history". In its opinion, Wheeler's story could be related by many of the Indian diaspora. In The Hindustan Times, Shashi Tharoor was quoted to say "Marina Wheeler delves deep into the history of her family that is linked inextricably with the history of a nation. This book is more than a family memoir - it is an insightful glimpse into the way small worlds are forever changed by the impersonal currents of history". The Tribune quoted Dip's thoughts that she felt "that here (in Sussex), with Charles, I had regained the paradise I lost in Sargodha".

== Awards and nominations ==
It was shortlisted for the 2021 RSL Christopher Bland Prize.
