= RSL Christopher Bland Prize =

British literary award

The RSL Christopher Bland Prize was inaugurated by the Royal Society of Literature to encourage the work of older writers. It is awarded annually to an author of a fiction or non-fiction book who was first published when aged 50 or over. The prize is valued at £10,000 and was launched in September 2018. It is named in recognition of Sir Christopher Bland, who was 76 when his first novel was published.

== Judges ==
The initial panel of judges was chaired by Gillian Slovo, and comprised Sanjeev Bhaskar, Archie Bland (son of Sir Christopher) and Anne Chisholm. The 2020 prize was judged by Yasmin Alibhai-Brown (Chair), Sara Collins and Andrew Lycett. The 2021 judges were Mary Beard (Chair), Monica Ali, Georgia Byng and Ben Hunte. The judging panel for the 2022 prize was David Baddiel (Chair), Naga Munchetty and Caroline Criado Perez. In 2023, the judges were Lemn Sissay (Chair), Simon Savidge and Meena Kandasamy. Judges for the 2024 prize were Shaparak Khorsandi (chair), Josh Cohen and Niall Griffiths. The judges for the prize in 2025 were Jacqueline Wilson (chair), Richard Coles and Margaret Busby.

== Winners ==
Year	Author	Title	Publisher
2019	Raynor Winn	The Salt Path	Michael Joseph
2020	Michele Kirsch	Clean	Short Books
2021	Pete Paphides	Broken Greek	Quercus
2022	Julia Parry	The Shadowy Third: Love, Letters, and Elizabeth Bowen	Duckworth Books
2023	Paterson Joseph	The Secret Diaries of Charles Ignatius Sancho	Dialogue
2024	Chidi Ebere	Now I Am Here	Pan Macmillan
2025	Kathryn Faulke	Every Kind of People	Fig Tree

== Shortlists ==
Year	Author	Title	Publisher
2019	Thomas Bourke	The Consolation of Maps	Riverrun
2019	Barbara Jenkins	De Rightest Place	Peepal Tree Press
2019	A. J. Pearce	Dear Mrs Bird	Picador
2019	Roland Philipps	A Spy Named Orphan	The Bodley Head
2019	Alex Reeve	The House on Half Moon Street	Raven Books
2019	Raynor Winn	The Salt Path	Michael Joseph
2020	Anne Griffin	When All is Said	Sceptre
2020	Michele Kirsch	Clean	Short Books
2020	Stephen Morris	Black Tea	Claret Press
2020	David Nott	War Doctor: Surgery on the Front Line	Picador
2020	Celia Paul	Self-Portrait	Jonathan Cape
2021	Rosanna Amaka	The Book of Echoes	Doubleday
2021	Richard Atkinson	Mr Atkinson's Rum Contract	4th Estate
2021	Michael Cashman	One of Them	Bloomsbury
2021	Louise Fein	People Like Us	Head of Zeus
2021	Pete Paphides	Broken Greek	Quercus
2021	Marina Wheeler	The Lost Homestead	Hodder & Stoughton
2022	Yvonne Bailey-Smith	The Day I Fell Off My Island	Myriad Editions
2022	John Carr	Escape From the Ghetto: The Breathtaking Story of the Boy Who Ran Away from Nazis	Hodder Studio
2022	Julia Parry	The Shadowy Third: Love, Letters, and Elizabeth Bowen	Duckworth Books
2022	Charlotte Raven	Patient 1: Forgetting and Finding Myself	Jonathan Cape
2022	Peter Stott	Hot Air: The Inside Story of the Battle Against Climate Change Denial	Atlantic Books
2023	Susie Alegre	Freedom to Think	Atlantic Books
2023	Jo Browning Wroe	A Terrible Kindness	Faber & Faber
2023	Bonnie Garmus	Lessons in Chemistry	Doubleday
2023	Jill Nalder	Love from the Pink Palace	Wildfire
2023	Paterson Joseph	The Secret Diaries of Charles Ignatius Sancho	Dialogue
2023	Devika Ponnambalam	I Am Not Your Eve	Bluemoose Books
2024	Chidi Ebere	Now I Am Here	Pan Macmillan
2024	Carole Hailey	The Silence Project	Atlantic Books
2024	Rachel Meller	The Box with the Sunflower Clasp	Icon Books
2024	Tom Parfitt	High Caucasus	Headline
2024	Allyson Shaw	Ashes & Stones: A Scottish Journey in Search of Witches and Witness	Hodder & Stoughton
2025	Diane Abbott	A Woman Like Me	Viking
2025	Jane Cholmeley	A Bookshop of One's Own	HarperCollins
2025	Kathryn Faulke	Every Kind of People	Penguin
2025	Hugh Greenhalgh	The Diaries of Mr Lucas	Atlantic
2025	Anne Hawk	The Pages of the Sea	Weatherglass
2025	Richard Shimell	Trees in Winter	Sphere

== Controversy ==
In 2019, Raynor Winn was awarded the £10,000 Christopher Bland Prize for debut writers after deceptively representing The Salt Path as her first book, despite it being her second.
