= List of Timeless characters =

Timeless is an American television series created by Eric Kripke and Shawn Ryan. The following is a list of characters from the series.

== Main characters ==
=== Lucy Preston ===
Lucy Preston (Abigail Spencer) is a history professor trying to follow her mother's footsteps. She has claustrophobia after having nearly drowned in a car accident while she was in college. Aside from history, Lucy is fluent in French. One night, she is recruited by Homeland Security and Mason Industries to the "Lifeboat" team with Wyatt and Rufus as a history advisor to stop Garcia Flynn and recover the "Mothership". Throughout the team's adventures, Lucy personally encounters Flynn, who reveals that he possesses a journal she will write in the future. Following the Hindenburg mission, Lucy is left reeling over her mother no longer dying of cancer, her sister never being born, and being engaged to a man who is a complete stranger. In addition, she finds out that her mother lied about who her biological father is. After several arguments, Carol reveals her biological father is Benjamin Cahill, whom Lucy discovers is part of Rittenhouse. Since Rittenhouse members are all descendants, Cahill tells Lucy that she's also a part of Rittenhouse. Lucy refuses to be a part of Rittenhouse, aiming to stop them. When the team travels back to 1954, Lucy gets the help of her grandfather to help bring Rittenhouse down. The plan works, and they get enough evidence to arrest Rittenhouse members. Just as Lucy gets permission to get Amy back using the time machine, she discovers that Carol is also part of Rittenhouse.

In season two, Lucy is kidnapped by Rittenhouse but later joins Carol and Emma in 1918 France to save Nicholas Keynes. She reunites with Wyatt and Rufus, who were led to believe she was dead, and reveals her plan to stop Rittenhouse, even if it meant killing herself. Emma discovers her plan, but Wyatt shows up and saves Lucy. Carol and Emma escape with Nicholas, while Lucy returns with Wyatt and Rufus. Lucy starts a romantic relationship with Wyatt, but when he discovers his wife, Jessica, is alive again, Lucy backs off. When Jessica realizes Lucy loves Wyatt, Lucy convinces her to stay and give Wyatt a second chance. Lucy befriends Flynn while dealing with her heartbreak, and finds out that a future version of herself gave Flynn the journal. While dealing with Rufus' death, Lucy is shocked when a second Lifeboat appears with Lucy and Wyatt from the future, offering to help the team save Rufus.

Lucy Preston is named after Bill S. Preston, Esquire, the first main protagonist of the Bill & Ted franchise.

=== Wyatt Logan ===
Wyatt Logan (Matt Lanter) is a U.S. Army Delta Force operative assigned to the Lifeboat team. As an elite soldier, he has expertise in weapons, picking locks, and is fluent in four languages. He constantly tries to cope with the loss of his wife Jessica, who was murdered in 2012. Because of this, he often wishes to use the time machine to prevent her death. While in 1962 Las Vegas, he takes a cue from Back to the Future Part II and has Western Union write a telegram for Jessica in 2012, but it doesn't work. After returning from 1893 Chicago, Flynn calls Wyatt, tells him who killed his wife, and suggests what he should do to reverse it. Wyatt also has PTSD after being the lone survivor of a failed operation. With the help of Rufus, Wyatt steals the Lifeboat and travels to 1983 to prevent the birth of Wes Gilliam, the serial killer who murdered Jessica. While he succeeds in erasing Gilliam from existence, he is arrested by Homeland Security and discovers that Jessica remains dead. He promptly escapes with the help of Agent Christopher, and reunites with the team to continue chasing after Flynn. After the team's 1954 mission, Wyatt decides to stick around with the team.

In season two, Wyatt develops a romantic relationship with Lucy, but after the team's 1941 Hollywood mission, he discovers that Jessica is alive. When Jessica threatens to divorce him, Wyatt reveals the existence of the time machine, and her original fate so she will give him a second chance. Despite choosing his wife, Wyatt still has feelings for Lucy, and is jealous when she hangs out more with Flynn. Though Wyatt becomes suspicious of Jessica, he refuses to let Agent Christopher move her out after he discovers Jessica is pregnant. When Jessica later reveals herself to be a Rittenhouse member, Wyatt admits his suspicions to the team. After returning from 1888 Chinatown, Wyatt admits to Lucy that he loves her just as a second Lifeboat shows up with Wyatt and Lucy from the future.

Wyatt Logan is named after Ted "Theodore" Logan, the second main protagonist of the Bill & Ted franchise.

=== Rufus Carlin ===
Rufus Carlin (Malcolm Barrett) is a programmer at Mason Industries assigned as the pilot of the prototype time machine "Lifeboat." He is initially uncomfortable with the idea of traveling with the team due to the unkind history of African-Americans over the centuries. During their adventures, Rufus sometimes uses names of famous black celebrities as his alias. He often asks historical figures why they do what they do. Rufus also has a complicated relationship with his co-worker Jiya, as they are both sci-fi fans. Though he bonds well with his teammates, he is revealed to be recording their activities under Mason's orders. When Rufus threatens to quit, he is threatened by an agent of Rittenhouse to stay with the team in order to assure the safety of his family. Rufus later records a threatening message and hands it to Mason to give to Rittenhouse. Mason responds by giving Rufus only six months in the company before eventually replacing him with Jiya, reminding him that he is expendable. During the team's 1931 Chicago mission, Rufus is shot by Al Capone, and he loses consciousness as he prepares the Lifeboat to jump back to the present. He recovers from his wound and has Jiya assist him in the team's 1954 mission.

In season two, Rufus becomes more concerned about Jiya's condition, as she sees premonitions of him in danger. He does not take this well, and asks Jiya to not tell him about her visions. Jiya later admits that she had another vision of Rufus dying, which Rufus has a hard time dealing with, acting recklessly, then distant from Jiya. When the team heads to 1888 Chinatown to rescue Jiya, she tells Rufus that her vision shows him dying trying to get her home and refuses to return to protect him. Despite Jiya saving Rufus from the death her vision saw, he still ends up getting shot dead by Emma Whitmore.

In "The Miracle of Christmas," the future Wyatt and Lucy reveal that saving Rufus is the key to defeating Rittenhouse and the answer lies in the future Lucy's journal. Wyatt eventually realizes that Jessica's presence in the timeline is what led to Rufus' death and she has to be removed to undo all that she caused. Flynn travels back 2012, sacrificing himself to kill Jessica on the night that she originally died. Rufus is restored to life and rescues his friends in 1848 but is left with the memories of a whole different time line since their mission in Hollywood. After the death of Emma and the defeat of Rittenhouse, Rufus and Jiya marry and by 2023 run RIYA Industries together.

Rufus Carlin is named after actor George Carlin and his character Rufus in the Bill & Ted franchise.

=== Garcia Flynn ===
Garcia Flynn (Goran Višnjić) is the series' antihero. A former NSA agent stationed in Eastern Europe, Flynn steals the Mothership with the intent of changing American history. While still with the NSA, Flynn intercepted a series of wire transfers between Mason and Rittenhouse. When he reported this to his superiors, Rittenhouse murdered his wife and daughter, but he escaped and was framed for the crime; since then, he swore to destroy Rittenhouse from its foundations. Flynn also possesses a journal written by Lucy sometime in the future, which he uses as a road map to his time travels. Despite his ruthlessness, Flynn shows guilt, telling Lucy that the atrocities he's committed make him unable to stay with his family, even if they do come back. Despite killing David Rittenhouse in 1780, Flynn discovers that history does not change at all. As he attempts to kill several Rittenhouse members in 1954, Lucy stops him and convinces him of another way to take down the organization. In the present day, as Rittenhouse members are being arrested with evidence collected on the organization, Lucy gives Flynn the name of the person who ordered the hit on his family, but Flynn is immediately arrested by Agent Christopher.

In season two, Flynn is in prison, but still provides the Lifeboat team with clues after Rittenhouse acquires the Mothership. While in 1941 Hollywood, the team helps Flynn escape from prison. He joins them in their hideout, and also starts traveling back with the Lifeboat team on their missions. Flynn later tells Lucy that a future version of her gave him the diary, suggesting that it will be possible one day to travel back into their own timeline.

In "The Miracle of Christmas", Lucy discovers from the journal that she and Flynn end up together, but he tells her that it does not last as she loves Wyatt more. After Wyatt realizes that removing Jessica from the timeline will save Rufus, Flynn slips off and takes the Lifeboat to 2012. He murders Jessica on the night that she originally died, saving Rufus. Suffering from the side effects of traveling back to his own timeline, Flynn returns the Lifeboat to the team, and stays back, seeing his family one last time before dying in 2012. The team mourns his death. After defeating Rittenhouse, Lucy and Wyatt name one of their daughters after Flynn. In 2023, the team makes one last trip to 2014 in São Paulo, where Lucy meets with the grief-stricken Flynn and sets him on his path.

=== Connor Mason ===
Connor Mason (Paterson Joseph) is the CEO of Mason Industries in San Francisco and the inventor of the two time machines. Of Black British descent, Mason is a father figure to Rufus, having taken him off the streets of Chicago and providing him with an education at MIT. It is later revealed by Flynn that Rittenhouse had secretly funded Mason's time machine project. While they have mutual understandings with each other about the project, Mason questions Rittenhouse's decisions such as recruiting Lucy when there are hundreds of history professors in the country with actual tenure. Agent Christopher discovers that Mason went bankrupt and he was suddenly given $2.5 billion to fund the time machine project. Connor has Rufus secretly record the missions for Rittenhouse, but Rufus eventually gets fed up and refuses to spy on his friends. Rittenhouse then orders Mason to train Jiya to become the Lifeboat pilot, replacing Rufus in six months. Though Mason goes along with Rittenhouse after they take over the Lifeboat missions, he later reveals to Agent Christopher that he was actually playing along, and has now got access to NSA servers to help her convict the Rittenhouse members. He admits that after Rittenhouse wanted to replace Rufus, he felt guilty, and wanted to save him by helping Agent Christopher. His software helps Christopher expose and arrest the Rittenhouse agents.

In season two, Mason Industries is in shambles after Rittenhouse bombs the company headquarters. While the Lifeboat team is relocated to a secret bunker by Agent Christopher, Mason faces bankruptcy and goes on a drinking binge, but he restores his faith in himself after saving blues musician Robert Johnson from Rittenhouse in 1936. In 2023, after the defeat of Rittenhouse, its shown that Mason chose to continue working with the government rather than rebuilding his business.

=== Denise Christopher ===
Denise Christopher (Sakina Jaffrey) is a Department of Homeland Security agent in charge of the Lifeboat team. She is initially unaware of the existence of Rittenhouse, but she grows suspicious of Mason and puts him under surveillance, eventually discovering Rittenhouse's agent, Benjamin Cahill. Agent Christopher is a lesbian and is married to a woman named Michelle, with two children, Olivia and Mark. After Lucy's sister Amy disappears from existence, Agent Christopher gives Lucy a flash drive containing photographs of her family and makes her promise to give it to her should her own family ever cease to exist. After Wyatt steals the time machine, Christopher is replaced by NSA Agent Neville, but later finds out that it's actually Rittenhouse who took over. She secretly assembles the Lifeboat team in a warehouse in Oakland to plan their next course of action. When Rittenhouse discovers them, she helps the team escape and is arrested by Agent Neville, but with the help of Mason and the Lifeboat team, she turns the tables and has Rittenhouse members all over the country arrested.

In season two, Agent Christopher relocates the Lifeboat team to an abandoned nuclear bunker after Mason Industries is destroyed in a bombing staged by the remnants of Rittenhouse. When the team travels back to 1981, they discover that a young Agent Christopher (Karen David), then a rookie MPD officer, is Rittenhouse's target, and Wyatt saves her from an attempted assassination. She was born Dhriti Sirivastava, and changed her name to honor the female officer who comforted her after her father was killed in an attempted robbery. Though she survives Rittenhouse trying to kill her, she is pressured by her mother into accepting an arranged marriage to a family friend, Sunil Devati. However, Lucy and Jiya help change her mind by showing her the drive, and she breaks off the engagement, saving her career and her family.

=== Jiya Marri ===
Jiya Marri (Claudia Doumit) is a programmer at Mason Industries. Rufus has a crush on her, and after he asks her out, she also shows interest in him. Their relationship develops over the course of the missions. When Rufus starts to defy Rittenhouse, Jiya is selected by Mason to replace him as the Lifeboat's pilot within six months, though Jiya has no idea about the threat to Rufus. Shortly after the team steals the Lifeboat, Jiya is detained by Neville. She is released with the help of Agent Christopher, and helps a wounded Rufus pilot the Lifeboat to the team's 1954 mission. However, because the Lifeboat was not designed to carry more than three passengers, Jiya loses consciousness and experiences seizures before being brought back into the present timeline. While hospitalized, she experiences another convulsion and has a brief vision of the Golden Gate Bridge being built in the late 1930s.

In season two, Jiya's seizures become premonitions, mostly about Rufus. Jiya is told by a doctor that she's completely healthy, though she still has visions. Jiya has a vision of Rufus dying that distresses her. After being kidnapped by Jessica, who forces her to pilot the Lifeboat to Rittenhouse headquarters, Jiya escapes and tries to get home. Due to being drugged and sustaining damage on the Lifeboat, Jiya ends up stranded in 1880s San Francisco. She manages to send a message, giving the location of the Lifeboat and telling the team not to come for her. Nevertheless, the team travels to 1888 Chinatown to bring her home. They find out that Jiya has actually been there for three years. Rufus finds her, and she reveals that he dies trying to rescue her, and refuses to leave. Rufus and Lucy, though, convince Jiya to come. Though Jiya is able to save Rufus from being killed as she predicted, Rufus still dies another way, and Jiya is heartbroken. This later reversed and they still remain a couple in the time jump with their own company RIYA now.

== Supporting characters ==
=== Anthony Bruhl ===
Anthony Bruhl (Matt Frewer) is a scientist at Mason Industries and the head of the time machine project who is abducted by Flynn. It is later revealed that Anthony helped Flynn steal the Mothership. He still doesn't agree with Flynn's actions, and tries to protect Rufus from getting hurt by Flynn. After uncovering Rittenhouse's plan, Anthony attempts to destroy the Mothership with C-4 explosives only to be killed by Flynn.

=== Carol Preston ===
Carol Preston (Susanna Thompson) is Lucy's mother. Following the Hindenburg mission, a chain reaction results in Henry Wallace, Carol's husband in the original timeline, marrying the granddaughter of a Hindenburg survivor. As a result, Carol never meets Henry, never becomes a smoker and does not contract lung cancer. The resulting butterfly effect erases the existence of her youngest daughter Amy while simultaneously exposing the fact that Lucy's father is not Henry. Following the downfall of Rittenhouse, Lucy reveals to Carol about her time travels and her intention to bring Amy back into the timeline, but Carol reveals to her that she is a Rittenhouse member, to Lucy's horror. She informs Lucy that Rittenhouse has recovered the Mothership, and is preparing their mission to alter history as they see fit.

In season two, she takes Lucy back to 1918 WWI to recover soldier Nicholas Keynes. However, Lucy tries to hinder her mother's plan, until Wyatt and Rufus show up and force Carol and Emma to give up Lucy in exchange for Nicholas. When Lucy asks her mother to choose her over Rittenhouse, Carol refuses, leaving with Emma and Nicholas. When Nicholas wakes up, Carol reveals that she is his granddaughter. When Nicholas puts a hit out on Lucy for hindering Rittenhouse's plans, Carol tries to protect Lucy, but she still stays with Rittenhouse. Tensions arise between Carol and Emma, who is unhappy that Carol is still protecting Lucy. In 1888 San Francisco, Carol is shot dead by Emma after preventing the latter from killing Lucy.

=== Benjamin Cahill ===
Benjamin Cahill (John Getz) is a Rittenhouse member who oversees the activities of Mason Industries and blackmails Rufus into committing to the Lifeboat team's mission. Outside of Rittenhouse, he is a pediatric surgeon at UCSF. The butterfly effect caused by the Hindenburg mission exposes the fact that Cahill is Lucy's birth father, which is why he chose her to be the Lifeboat trio's historian. When Lucy discovers his identity and confronts him, Cahill tells her that her own involvement with Rittenhouse is in her blood. After Wyatt steals the Lifeboat for his personal mission in 1983, Cahill takes charge of the team's missions. Agent Christopher, however, takes back control of the Lifeboat's missions and, thanks to Rittenhouse data collected by Lucy's grandfather, has Cahill arrested and sent to prison.

In "The Miracle of Christmas", Agent Christopher enlists Benjamin's help to take down Emma and the remnants of Rittenhouse. Disgusted by what Emma has turned Rittenhouse into, Benjamin agrees to help save his daughter in exchange for immunity and protection for his teenage son, stating that family still means something to him. With Benjamin's help, Emma and the remnants of Rittenhouse are taken down and the team is rescued from death in 1950 North Korea.

=== Emma Whitmore ===
Emma Whitmore (Annie Wersching) is a former Mason Industries employee and one of the Lifeboat's first test pilots who stranded herself in the 19th century after Rittenhouse threatened her family. She stays in the timeline for a decade until Flynn finds her. Upon returning to the present day, Emma reveals Rittenhouse's plan to control history with the Mothership. She assumes the role of the Mothership's pilot following Anthony's death. Following the downfall of Rittenhouse and Flynn's arrest, Emma is revealed to be a Rittenhouse agent, stealing the Mothership after killing agents sent to retrieve it.

In season two, Emma now pilots the Mothership for Rittenhouse. Emma is bitter toward Lucy since she hid out for a decade to prove her loyalty, while Lucy is accepted because she's a "pure-blood." Emma discovers Lucy's plan to sabotage Rittenhouse and tries to kill her, but Lucy is saved by Wyatt. Emma constantly clashes with Carol, insinuating herself to have more power within Rittenhouse. While offering a temporary truce to Rufus and Flynn, Emma reveals that she and her mother ran away from her abusive father when she was a child. Emma graduated with top honors at a magnet school and was accepted by Caltech, leading to her recruitment in Rittenhouse. When Carol prevents Emma from killing Lucy in 1888, she kills Carol and Nicholas in a rage before taking leadership of Rittenhouse.

In "The Miracle of Christmas", Emma plots to kill the Lifeboat team. Flynn secretly travels back to 2012 and kills Jessica Logan, Emma's second-in-command and undercover lover. Furious, she lures the team to 1950 North Korea to have the advancing Chinese Army kill them. However, Emma is tracked down and captured by Agent Christopher, with the help of Benjamin Cahill, and forced to fly the Mothership to the past and rescue the team. Emma attempts to trade saving Amy for her own freedom, but Lucy refuses. Moments later, Emma is killed by Chinese soldiers and her body is left behind in 1950 as the team escapes in the Mothership. Emma's death marks the end of Rittenhouse and their mission.

=== Nicholas Keynes ===
Nicholas Keynes (Michael Rady) is a U.S. Army soldier stationed in France during the Battle of Saint-Mihiel of World War I. Lucy, Carol, and Emma travel to 1918 to bring Nicholas to the present, the latter two of the three accomplishing the mission. It is later revealed that Keynes is Carol's grandfather and penned a manifesto in 1910 that planted the foundation for time travel. Keynes proceeds to take leadership of Rittenhouse and puts a master plan of reshaping history to perfection into action. He and Carol are killed by Emma during the 1888 Chinatown mission.

=== Jessica Logan ===
Jessica Logan (Tonya Glanz) is Wyatt's wife. Prior to Wyatt joining the Lifeboat team, Jessica was murdered in 2012. Wyatt attempts to prevent the murder by hijacking the Lifeboat and erase the existence of the murderer, only to discover that Jessica remains dead. After going to 1941 Hollywood, Wyatt discovers that Jessica is alive, and it is revealed that Rittenhouse prevented her death. When Jessica threatens to divorce Wyatt, he takes her to the bunker to reveal her original fate, and convince her to give him a second chance. Wyatt later finds out that Jessica's brother, Kevin, is alive, but he died of leukemia in the original timeline. Jessica tells Wyatt that she's pregnant just as he finds out about Kevin. Jessica later reveals herself to be a Rittenhouse member, kidnapping Jiya and stealing the Lifeboat. When Rittenhouse travels back to 1888, Jessica is there, and Wyatt confronts her about Rittenhouse. She reveals that Rittenhouse saved Kevin, and then recruited her into their organization. Despite declaring her loyalty to Rittenhouse, Wyatt lets Jessica escape.

In "The Miracle of Christmas," it's revealed that Jessica lied about being pregnant. Wyatt realizes that if Jessica dies the way she originally did, they will be able to save Rufus. Flynn slips away and travels back to 2012, where he kills Jessica on the night she originally died. Jessica's death in 2012 restores Rufus to life and creates an alternate time line for everyone but Wyatt, Lucy, Jiya, and Emma, who still remember what happened when Jessica still existed. Wyatt realizes that Flynn had been Jessica's killer all along and her murder had been intended to save Wyatt.

== Recurring characters ==
- Amy Preston (Bailey Noble) is Lucy's younger sister in the original timeline. Following the Hindenburg mission, Amy is erased from existence due to Carol Preston never marrying Henry Wallace. Its later revealed that Emma purposefully erased Amy from history on the orders of Rittenhouse, and she claims that Amy can never be restored. In "The Miracle of Christmas", Emma offers to restore Amy while the future Lucy's journal offers a chance for Lucy to figure it out on her own. However, Lucy decides that the risks are too high and accepts that Amy is gone. She later names one of her and Wyatt's daughters after her sister.
- Noah (Daniel Di Tomasso) is Lucy's fiancé in the altered timeline, though she does not know him. After their engagement party, Lucy tells Noah that she needs time off for some soul searching. Realizing that she feels uncomfortable with him, he begins to wonder if Lucy is the same woman he loves. Because Noah is a doctor, Lucy calls him to treat Rufus' gunshot wound upon returning from their 1931 Chicago mission, but she shortly breaks up with him without revealing the truth about her time travels. After Flynn kills Jessica in 2012 and restores the original timeline, Rufus states that for him, Lucy and Wyatt are still together, meaning that Lucy never got engaged to Noah.
- Karl (Chad Rook) is Flynn's main henchman. Following the 1931 Chicago mission, Karl leaves Flynn's team.
- Special Agent Patrick Ramsey (Hector Hugo) is Agent Christopher's supervisor at Homeland Security. Originally tasked with relieving Wyatt of his duties, Ramsey allows him to stay with the Lifeboat team at the insistence of both Lucy and Rufus before continuing to oversee the Mothership recovery mission with Agent Christopher.
- Dave Baumgardner (Victor Zinck Jr.) is a soldier who worked alongside Wyatt in Delta Force. Nicknamed "Bam-Bam", he is initially brought into Mason Industries to replace Wyatt prior to the Lifeboat team's Alamo mission, but following that mission, Lucy and Rufus convince Agent Christopher to keep Wyatt in the team. After Wyatt is arrested for stealing the Lifeboat, Dave takes over his position in the team. In 1927 Paris, he is killed by Karl in a shootout while protecting Lucy and Rufus.
- Special Agent Jake Neville (Jim Beaver) is an NSA agent sent in to take over the time machine project from Agent Christopher, but is actually with Rittenhouse. He tries to eliminate Flynn's existence by killing his mother in 1962, but Lucy and Rufus knock out his operative and steal the Lifeboat. After receiving enough evidence from Mason and Ethan Cahill's secret archives, Agent Christopher arrests Agent Neville and takes back control.
- Michelle Christopher (Marci T. House) is Agent Christopher's wife.

== Guest characters ==
=== Season 1 ===
==== "Pilot" ====
- Kate Drummond (Shantel VanSanten) is a journalist for Hearst covering the Hindenburg landing on May 6, 1937. In the original timeline, Kate is crushed to death by a section of the burning airship. When the Lifeboat team arrive in 1937, Wyatt makes a futile attempt to save her as she reminds him of his late wife Jessica. After the Lifeboat team saves the Hindenburg's passengers and crew while inadvertently causing a different version of the disaster, Kate is later shot by Flynn during a confrontation with Wyatt and Lucy. Following the mission, she is listed as one of the two people who died in the disaster; the other being one of Flynn's henchmen.

==== "The Assassination of Abraham Lincoln" ====
- John Wilkes Booth (Kelly Blatz) is a stage actor and Confederate sympathizer responsible for assassinating Abraham Lincoln in the original timeline. Upon arriving in 1865, Flynn arms Booth and his coconspirators with semiautomatic weapons so they can kill Lincoln as well as Andrew Johnson, William H. Seward, and Ulysses S. Grant. When Booth refuses to replace his Philadelphia Deringer, Flynn knocks him unconscious and assassinates Lincoln himself. After returning to the present, the Lifeboat team learns that Booth was still killed for his involvement.
- Robert Todd Lincoln (Neal Bledsoe) is Abraham Lincoln's first son and a former aide to Ulysses S. Grant during the Civil War. After meeting Lucy, who is operating under the pseudonym "Juliet Shakesman", Robert invites her to Ford's Theatre. Following his father's death, Robert thanks Lucy for saving Grant's life.
- Nicholas Biddle (Mike Wade) is a soldier in the 2nd Regiment Colored Infantry who confronts Rufus over his uniform, revealing his disgust over the fact that he is pretending to be a soldier while thousands of men lost their lives. Biddle eventually comes to respect Rufus for saving Johnson from one of Booth's co-conspirators.

==== "Atomic City" ====
- Judith Campbell (Elena Satine) is President John F. Kennedy's mistress who acts as his connection to Mafia boss Sam Giancana. In 1962, while Kennedy (Scott Bailey) is in Las Vegas, Nevada, for a fundraising event hosted by the Democratic National Committee at the Sands Hotel and Casino, Flynn takes photos of Judith with Kennedy before blackmailing her into helping him steal a plutonium core from a nearby U.S. Army base. Despite her involvement with Flynn and the Lifeboat team, Judith's history remains unchanged until her death in 1999.

==== "Party at Castle Varlar" ====
- Ian Fleming (Sean Maguire) is a British Naval Intelligence officer posing as a Nazi SS officer in December 1944. He reluctantly helps the Lifeboat team rescue Wernher von Braun and escort him to the Allies. Just as the team is about to leave Castle Varlar with Von Braun, Fleming threatens to kill him to avenge his brother's death, but Lucy manages to talk him out of it, reminding him of Von Braun's importance to the Allies. They manage to escape the Nazis through a priest hole within the castle. After returning to the present day, the team learns that their adventure inspired Fleming to write the James Bond novel Weapon of Choice, which was a box office hit in 1964.
- Wernher von Braun (Christian Oliver) is a German scientist and the inventor of the V-2 rocket. In an attempt to prevent the United States from winning the Space Race, Flynn abducts von Braun and prepares to hand him over to the Soviet Union. However, Flynn's plan fails and von Braun is escorted to the Allies by Fleming and the Lifeboat team.

==== "The Alamo" ====
- James Bowie (Chris Browning) is a Texian Volunteer Colonel and the co-commander of the Texian forces during the Battle of the Alamo. While helping the women and children evacuate, he entrusts Wyatt with his fighting knife and asks him to keep it away from the invading Mexican Army.
- Davy Crockett (Jeff Kober) is a frontiersman and folk hero garrisoned in the Alamo. When the Lifeboat team arrives in 1836, he is telling the story of how he wrestled a bear with one arm. During the battle, Crockett reveals to Rufus that he ran away from the bear and reminds him that it is sometimes okay to retreat from an impossible situation.
- William B. Travis (David Chisum) is a Texian Lieutenant Colonel credited for writing the "Victory or Death" open letter during the battle. He is shot and killed by Flynn before he can finish the letter, forcing Lucy to complete the letter and ensure that it is delivered to General Sam Houston.
- John William Smith (Sean Michael Kyer) is a Texian soldier and the future first Mayor of San Antonio. When the Mexican Army opens fire on the Alamo, he is saved by Wyatt after being pinned by falling debris. He is later convinced by Lucy to accompany the women and children and deliver the "Victory or Death" letter to General Houston.
- Antonio López de Santa Anna (Alex Fernandez) is the President of Mexico and the commander of the Mexican Army. After being bribed by Flynn, Santa Anna orders his army to invade the Alamo three days ahead of its original date. To Flynn's dismay, Santa Anna raises the red flag during the battle.

==== "The Watergate Tape" ====
- Doc (Tiffany Mack) is a member of the Black Liberation Army. Having earned the nickname "Doc" due to her Ph.D. in history, she is revealed to be a former member of Rittenhouse who knows the organization's entire roster, thus making her a target for both Flynn and Rittenhouse. "Doc" left the organization for the safety of her husband and son, who fled to Hong Kong and were last known to have traveled north ever since. She is mentioned in the missing 18½ minutes of President Richard Nixon's Oval Office recordings and is initially misinterpreted by Flynn and the Lifeboat team as a "document". Lucy and Rufus help her escape to San Diego while Flynn and his gang kill the Rittenhouse agents in her hideout.
- Gregory Hayes (Mustafa Shakir) is the leader of the Washington, D.C., chapter of the Black Liberation Army. Despite his initial disagreements with an undercover Rufus, Hayes leads him and Lucy to "Doc". After Lucy and Rufus help "Doc" escape, he drives her out of Washington as the Lifeboat team returns to the present.
- Mark Felt (Tom Amandes) is an FBI agent and the informant who provided information to Bob Woodward about the Watergate scandal and its subsequent attempted coverup. When Lucy and Rufus meet with him, Felt reveals that there was a separate break-in one floor above the Democratic National Committee's office at the Watergate complex, one that was ignored by the authorities but revealed to have involved the BLA. After their meeting, Lucy tells Felt that he should continue talking to Woodward, knowing full well he never met Carl Bernstein.

==== "Stranded" ====
- Nonhelema (Karina Lombard) is a chieftess of the Shawnee tribe during the French and Indian War. When her tribe captures the Lifeboat team, Nonhelema sentences Lucy and Wyatt to death but spares Rufus' life, knowing that he is "not here by choice". She eventually spares Lucy and Wyatt after Rufus convinces her to let them go.
- Louis Coulon de Villiers (Salvator Xuereb) is a captain in the French army and the commander of Fort Duquesne during the French and Indian War. He is also, as Lucy points out, the only enemy commander who forced George Washington to surrender (at the Battle of Fort Necessity). After capturing the Lifeboat team, de Villiers returns to Fort Duquesne, unaware that the team escaped after Wyatt killed his son.

==== "Space Race" ====
- Katherine Johnson (Nadine Ellis) is a physicist and mathematician responsible for calculating trajectories for NASA's space missions, including the Apollo 11 lunar landing. When Anthony inserts a DoS attack into the Manned Spacecraft Center's mainframe, Rufus and Lucy ask Katherine to help get the mainframe back online. After the team returns to the present, Rufus mentions that Katherine became NASA's first female flight director and a movie about her life was made.
- Maria Thompkins (Caitlin Carver) is a Lockman Aerospace secretary and a single mother raising her son Gabriel. Flynn infiltrates Maria's home and saves Gabriel's life by using epinephrine to counter anaphylactic shock from a bee sting before escaping. Upon returning to the present, the team learns that Maria is Flynn's mother and Gabriel is his half-brother, who currently lives in Paris due to Flynn preventing his death.

==== "Last Ride of Bonnie and Clyde" ====
- Bonnie Parker and Clyde Barrow (Jacqueline Byers and Sam Strike, respectively) are two criminals who committed numerous bank robberies throughout the Central United States from 1932 until their deaths on May 23, 1934. In the original timeline, the two were ambushed and killed by law enforcement on a rural road in Bienville Parish, Louisiana. Upon arriving in 1934, the Lifeboat team discovers that Flynn is after Bonnie's gold necklace key, which Clyde gave to her after stealing it from Henry Ford. After Flynn steals the necklace from Bonnie, the two are killed by Frank Hamer's men at their hideout.
- Frank Hamer (Chris Mulkey) is a Texas Ranger who spearheaded the hunt for Bonnie and Clyde. Flynn gains Hamer's trust by posing as a bounty hunter and helping him track down the criminal duo days ahead of their original death date.
- Henry Methvin (Billy Wickman) is a member of the Barrow Gang who discloses the location of Bonnie and Clyde's hideout after being captured by Hamer and promised a lighter prison sentence. Methvin returns to the hideout only to be shot and killed by Clyde when Rufus plays a recording of Methvin's confession.

==== "The Capture of Benedict Arnold" ====
- David Rittenhouse (Armin Shimerman) is a clockmaker and astronomer as well as the founder of the Rittenhouse organization. When Benedict Arnold introduces him to Flynn and the Lifeboat team, David kills Arnold before arranging for Wyatt and Flynn to be executed. David proceeds to send Lucy to his bedroom so he can rape her. Before he can do so, however, he is shot dead by Flynn.
- John Rittenhouse (Jake Brennan) is David's son who desires to follow in his father's footsteps as a clockmaker. After witnessing his father's murder, John tries to escape only to be confronted by Flynn. Before Flynn can kill John, Lucy intervenes and allows the boy to escape into the night. His fate is unknown, as Lucy is unable to find any records of him following the 1780 mission.
- Benedict Arnold (Curtis Caravaggio) is a General in the Continental Army who defected to the British Army. Upon arriving in 1780, the Lifeboat team learns that Arnold was one of Rittenhouse's founding members and they work with Flynn to capture Arnold so he can take them to Rittenhouse. Arnold does so only to be killed by David Rittenhouse.
- George Washington (Damian O'Hare) is the Commander-in-Chief of the Continental Army and one of the key Founding Fathers of the United States. Flynn earns Washington's trust by posing as Culper Ring courier Austin Roe, whom he killed after arriving in 1780.

==== "The World's Columbian Exposition" ====
- Harry Houdini (Michael Drayer) is a Hungarian-American illusionist known for his daring escape acts. While performing at the Chicago World's Fair, he is abducted by Flynn and coerced into helping him assassinate Thomas Edison, Henry Ford and J. P. Morgan. At the last minute, however, Houdini foils his plans after Lucy reminds him of his cutpurse trick. He later helps Lucy rescue Wyatt and Rufus from H. H. Holmes.
- Sophia Hayden (Katherine Cunningham) is an architect and the first female graduate of the four-year architecture program at the Massachusetts Institute of Technology. When Rufus mentions that he also went to MIT, she mistakes him for Robert Robinson Taylor, the first African-American MIT student, but he tells her he was "the other black guy". Sophia, along with Wyatt and Rufus, are trapped in an airtight chamber by H. H. Holmes. Using her architectural skills, Sophia discovers a rotting brick in the wall and has Wyatt dig a hole through it with a pin before alerting Lucy and Houdini of their presence.
- H. H. Holmes (Joel Johnstone) is a serial killer who is believed to have murdered an estimated 200 people, many of whom were brought to the World's Fair Hotel. After trapping Wyatt and Rufus in an airtight chamber with Sofia, Holmes poses as a fellow captive named "George Henry" so he can see the fear in his victims. When Lucy and Houdini rescue the three, Holmes reveals himself and traps Lucy in the hotel's basement only to be shot and killed by Wyatt.

==== "The Murder of Jesse James" ====
- Jesse James (Daniel Lissing) is an American outlaw known for his numerous bank, stagecoach, and train robberies, which he committed from 1866 until his death on April 3, 1882. After preventing Charley and Robert Ford from killing him, Flynn convinces James to locate Emma Whitmore. James does so and takes Flynn's machine gun as payment. When the Lifeboat team arrives at Emma's cabin with Bass Reeves and Grant Johnson, James surrenders after a gunfight only to be shot in the back by Lucy.
- Bass Reeves (Colman Domingo) is a U.S. Marshal stationed in the Oklahoma Territory and one of the first African American lawmen. Upon arriving in April 1882, the Lifeboat team convince Reeves, who has strong relations with the local Native American tribes, to help them find Flynn and James. After giving Lucy her reward money for killing James, Reeves tells them that they will have to live with the fact that she shot and killed a man.
- Grant Johnson (Zahn McClarnon) is a U.S. Marshal stationed in the Oklahoma Territory and Reeves' partner. After learning that Reeves was the inspiration for the Lone Ranger, Wyatt remarks that Johnson might be the inspiration for Tonto due to his Native American ancestry. This causes Johnson to take offense as the word "Tonto" is "fool" in Spanish. Upon reaching Emma's cabin, Johnson is shot and killed by James.
- Wes Gilliam (Michael Adamthwaite) is a serial killer serving two consecutive life sentences at San Quentin State Prison for killing Jessica and two other women. After learning Wes' identity from Flynn, Wyatt visits him and learns the full details of how he killed Jessica before embarking on a mission to erase Gilliam from existence.

==== "Karma Chameleon" ====
- Claire Gilliam (Amanda Brooks) is a domestic airline stewardess and the mother of Wes Gilliam. After learning that Wes was born as the result of a one-night stand with bartender Joel Bender in Toledo, Ohio, on March 19, 1983, Wyatt attempts to prevent the meetup by befriending Claire and convincing her to go home. His plan backfires, however, when Claire's co-workers arrive and give her the impression that Wyatt has been stalking her.
- Joel Bender (Drew Roy) is a bartender at the Toledo Express Hotel and the father of Wes Gilliam. After failing to prevent Joel and Claire from meeting, Wyatt storms into Claire's room and drags Joel outside. Joel tries to escape from Wyatt only to die after tripping in the hotel parking lot and cracking his skull. Upon returning to the present, Wyatt learns that Joel's death resulted in Wes being erased from existence. As a result, the two women Wes killed are alive while Jessica remains dead, indicating that someone else killed her.
- Becky (Lucie Guest) is a domestic airline stewardess and Claire's co-worker who makes an instant connection with Rufus, primarily due to the fact that they both like TV shows such as The A-Team and Manimal.

==== "The Lost Generation" ====
- Charles Lindbergh (Jesse Luken) is an aviator known for making the first solo transatlantic flight in May 1927. Upon his arrival in France, Lindbergh is shot out of the sky and abducted by Flynn, who is determined to prevent him from becoming a member of Rittenhouse. He is rescued by the Lifeboat team and encouraged by Lucy to stay away from Rittenhouse. After returning to the present, however, the team learns that Lindbergh went underground for a few weeks before resuming his intended life of fame and fortune.
- Ernest Hemingway (Brandon Barash) is a journalist and writer who offers his services as the Lifeboat team's muscle after Dave Baumgardner is killed in a confrontation with Karl.
- Josephine Baker (Tiffany Daniels) is an African-American singer and entertainer who provides the Lifeboat team with information on Flynn and Lindbergh's whereabouts. Rufus, being a fan, refers to her as the Beyoncé of her time.

==== "Public Enemy No. 1" ====
- Al Capone (Cameron Gharaee) is a gangster and the leader of the Chicago Outfit who attained notoriety during the Prohibition era. In the original timeline, he is arrested and charged with tax evasion. Upon arriving in 1931, Flynn agrees to help Capone avoid prison on the condition that he arrange a meeting with Mayor William Hale Thompson. During a confrontation with the Lifeboat team, Capone fatally wounds Rufus to return the favor only to be later gunned down by his brother James Vincenzo.
- Eliot Ness (Misha Collins) is a Prohibition agent and the leader of the federal law enforcement team "The Untouchables". In the original timeline, Ness and his team play a key role in the events leading to Capone's arrest. When Capone avoids prison as a result of Flynn's actions, Ness is approached by the Lifeboat team and agrees to help them arrest both Capone and Flynn. Shortly after, however, Ness is assassinated by a hitman sent to his hideout on Flynn's orders.
- Richard Hart (Mather Zickel) is a Prohibition agent who is revealed to be Capone's elder brother James Vincenzo. Following Ness' death, the Lifeboat team convince a reluctant James to bring his younger brother to justice. James later shoots and kills Capone during a gunfight.
- William Hale Thompson (Richard Portnow) is the Mayor of Chicago and a member of Rittenhouse who reveals to Flynn that the organization is set to meet in Washington, D.C., in 1954.

==== "The Red Scare" ====
- Ethan Cahill (Johnathan Tchaikovsky and Bruce Gray) is Lucy's grandfather and a member of Rittenhouse. In 1954, Ethan promises to take Lucy and Wyatt to the Rittenhouse summit on the condition that they keep his homosexuality a secret. After convincing a reluctant Flynn to work with Ethan, the Lifeboat team returns to the present and visit an elderly Ethan, who entrusts them with Rittenhouse's records.
- Joseph McCarthy (Spencer Garrett) is a politician and United States Senator who exploited the country's fear of Communism through his campaign against alleged members of the Communist Party. Upon arriving in 1954, Flynn blackmails McCarthy into revealing where the Rittenhouse summit will be held before claiming Lucy and Wyatt are Soviet spies. McCarthy later interrogates Wyatt about his supposed relationship to the Soviet Union only to be incapacitated by Wyatt.

=== Season 2 ===
==== "The War to End All Wars" ====
- Captain Albright (Matthew Atherton) is a Rittenhouse sleeper agent in the U.S. Army during World War I. He carries around a modern cell phone that contains the manifesto written by Nicholas Keynes for Rittenhouse to control history through time travel. When Wyatt and Rufus try to save Lucy, Carol Preston's henchman, Mac, gets Captain Albright to arrest both of them so they will be eliminated. However, Wyatt gains the upper hand and kills both Mac and Albright. Wyatt later discovers the phone and figures out Rittenhouse's plan to use sleeper cells to change history.
- Marie Curie (Kim Bubbs) is a Polish physicist who developed mobile radiography units for field hospitals during WWI. She and her daughter Irène assist Lucy, Carol, and Emma in saving a critically wounded Keynes. On their way back to the army camp, the Curies discover the Mothership and are threatened at gunpoint by Emma but escape after Wyatt and Rufus intervene.
- Irène Joliot-Curie (Melissa Farman) is a nurse and the daughter of Marie Curie.

==== "The Darlington 500" ====
- Wendell Scott (Joseph Lee Anderson) is the first African-American race car driver to win a NASCAR race. When he meets the Lifeboat team at Darlington Raceway on September 4, 1955, he notices Rufus nodding at him, unaware that it is a modern gesture of respect among African-Americans. Meanwhile, he confides in Wyatt, who is a long-time NASCAR fan and knows about Wendell's history. The team convinces Wendell to help them on their mission after claiming NASCAR champion Ryan Millerson is a Communist.
- Ryan Millerson (Matt Long) is a Rittenhouse sleeper agent posing as a NASCAR champion. Having been planted in 1946, Millerson gets married, with his wife (Annie Tedesco) expecting their child prior to the Mothership entering the timeline. Because of this, his integrity in the organization is questioned by Emma. At the 1955 Southern 500, Millerson is assigned on a suicide mission to kill attending automotive executives with a car bomb, allowing Rittenhouse to take over the car industry. Emma holds his wife hostage to ensure he completes his mission. Wyatt shoots Millerson dead, to the horror of his wife, before the trio takes the car away from the speedway and defuses the bomb at Wendell's garage.

==== "Hollywoodland" ====
- Hedy Lamarr (Alyssa Sutherland) is an actress and inventor responsible for patenting the design for an early form of frequency hopping, which was later incorporated into Wi-Fi technology. After meeting the Lifeboat team, Hedy helps them steal "RKO 281" back from Rittenhouse before returning the workprint to Orson Welles. Upon returning to the present, the team discovers that Hedy, whom Rufus advised to renew her patents, quit acting and formed a technology company that made her worth over thirty billion dollars.
- Lucas Calhoun (Teddy Sears) is a Rittenhouse sleeper agent sent to 1926 Los Angeles by his father. By 1941, he is an RKO Pictures producer. When his father (Josh Randall) travels back to 1941, they steal RKO 281 and offer it to William Randolph Hearst in exchange for a weekly column in all of Hearst's papers, enabling Rittenhouse to easily rewrite history with their propaganda. Lucas is shot dead by Wyatt before handing the workprint to Hearst representatives.
- William Randolph Hearst (John Colton) is a businessman, politician, and the founder of Hearst Communications. He is also the inspiration for Charles Foster Kane, the protagonist of Citizen Kane.
- George Antheil (Beau Brians) is a musician and inventor who co-patented the radio guidance system with Hedy.
- Barney Balaban (James DuMont) is the president of Paramount Pictures. Rufus manages to have a meeting with Balaban by pretending to be African-American playwright Langston Hughes.

==== "The Salem Witch Hunt" ====
- Abiah Franklin (Sofia Vassilieva) is a woman who sees the Salem witch trials of 1692 as unfair. She meets the Lifeboat team upon their arrival and takes them to the ongoing trials, only to discover that she has been added among the eight people to be executed, potentially erasing her future son Benjamin Franklin from existence. The Lifeboat team saves Abiah and all of the accused from execution, turning the Salem witch trials into the "Salem revolt".
- Bathsheba Pope (Emily Swallow) is Abiah's sister and one of the accusers during the Salem witch trials. The Lifeboat team confronts Bathsheba and her husband, Joseph (Patrick Fischler), about her accusing Abiah of witchcraft.
- Samuel Sewall (Todd Weeks) is one of the judges during the Salem witch trials. Based on a premonition seen by Jiya of Rufus shooting Samuel, the Lifeboat team suspects Samuel of being a Rittenhouse sleeper agent, but when Flynn interrogates him, they realize he is not one of them. After the Lifeboat team frees all of the accused from being executed, Samuel confronts Rufus with a gun, but Rufus convinces him to go home to his daughter. However, Samuel is trampled by a runaway horse carriage, much to the horror of Rufus.
- John Hathorne (Henri Lubatti) is one of the leading judges during the Salem witch trials. He is killed by Flynn after attacking Lucy while she frees Abiah from being hanged.

==== "The Kennedy Curse" ====
- John F. Kennedy (Grant Jordan) is a 17-year-old student in 1934 who becomes the 35th President of the United States from 1961 to 1963. During a mission that goes wrong, Wyatt and Rufus bring the young Kennedy back to the present timeline. While the Lifeboat is recharging for the return trip, Kennedy leaves the bunker and roams around the San Francisco area. He befriends a college student named Kayla, who reveals to him his future as president and the unfortunate events his family had to endure. After the Lifeboat team recovers Kennedy, he is told by Rufus not to go to Dallas on November 22, 1963. Shortly after bringing Kennedy back to 1934 and picking up Flynn, Rufus discovers that Kennedy is assassinated in Austin.
- Kayla (Reina Hardesty) is a college student who meets Kennedy at a gas station near the bunker. She and her friends drop him off to the nearest hospital after he experiences stomach pains, which is one of his lifelong health issues.

==== "The King of the Delta Blues" ====
- Robert Johnson (Kamahl Naiqui) is a musician known for being a pioneer of the Delta blues. His music led to the birth of rock and roll, which became an integral part of the counterculture of the 1960s. After the Lifeboat team saves Johnson from a Rittenhouse agent, producer Don Law gets into a heated argument with them before Johnson walks out, believing he is cursed by the rumors of him selling his soul to the devil. Mason, who is a fan of Johnson's music, convinces him to continue his career as a musician and records his sessions after Law is murdered by another Rittenhouse sleeper agent named Betty (Natasha Marc). When the Lifeboat team returns to the present timeline, Mason discovers he is credited in Johnson's album under the pseudonym "Lando Calrissian".
- Don Law (Gavin Stenhouse) is a British music producer who recorded Johnson's Delta blues sessions at the Gunter Hotel in San Antonio, Texas, on November 23, 1936. Just as Lucy and Flynn prepare to bring Law to a juke joint to record Johnson's performance, Law is shot dead by the Rittenhouse sleeper agent Betty.

==== "Mrs. Sherlock Holmes" ====
- Alice Paul (Erica Dasher) is a suffragist who led the campaign for the Nineteenth Amendment to the United States Constitution. Rittenhouse sends a sleeper agent to March 4, 1919, to frame Alice for the murder of Senator Wadsworth, preventing her from giving her speech in front of U.S. President Woodrow Wilson (Bryan Scott Johnson). While incarcerated in a NYPD precinct, Alice is killed by the sleeper agent in her jail cell.
- Grace Humiston (Sarah Sokolovic) is a lawyer who would become the first female United States Attorney. She earned the nickname "Mrs. Sherlock Holmes" after solving the cold case of Ruth Cruger's disappearance. Lucy and Wyatt enlist her help in proving Alice's innocence. Following the death of Alice, Grace encourages the women's suffrage movement to hold a silent vigil. Grace stops the sleeper agent from killing Lucy and takes Alice's role in giving the speech in front of President Wilson.

==== "The Day Reagan Was Shot" ====
- Ananya Sirivastava (Pooja Batra) is Denise's mother, who is completely against her career in law enforcement. She wants Denise to leave the force and settle in an arranged marriage. In the original timeline, Denise has almost no relationship with her mother, who doesn't know about Denise's wife and children. When Denise is nearly killed in 1981, Ananya convinces her to accept an arranged marriage, potentially ending Denise's future law enforcement career. Jiya and Lucy convince Denise not to go through with the marriage. Denise admits that she's gay to her mother, something Ananya does not take well. When the team returns to the present, Denise and her mother have worked through their difficulties, and Ananya has a loving relationship with her grandchildren.
- Owen (Matthew Alan) is a Rittenhouse sleeper agent sent to 1969 and activated in 1981, posing as a Secret Service agent ordered to kill Denise. After failing to kill Denise, he is nabbed and interrogated by Wyatt and Rufus. Owen tells them that Rittenhouse bailed his family out after his father was caught embezzling money, and he was ordered to do this assignment out of fear for his family's safety in 2018. He then confesses that his brother is out to finish the job. Wyatt and Rufus kill Owen's brother to prevent the assassination, but upon returning to where Owen is held, they discover that he has hanged himself.
- John Hinckley Jr. (Erik Stocklin) is a man who attempted to assassinate U.S. President Ronald Reagan on March 30, 1981, to get Jodie Foster's attention. He escapes after the Lifeboat team foils his assassination attempt, prompting Lucy and Jiya to get Denise's help in tracking him down. Hinckley wounds himself and has himself admitted to George Washington University Hospital, the same hospital where President Reagan is sent, but is immediately arrested thanks to Lucy and Jiya's tipoff.

==== "The General" ====
- Harriet Tubman (Christine Horn) is an abolitionist and a spy for the Union army during the Civil War, known as "The General." Her troops are ambushed by the Confederates, thanks to a Rittenhouse sleeper agent, preventing her from carrying out the Combahee River Raid. She survives, and the Time Team gets her help to find the Rittenhouse sleeper agent. Despite being low on troops, Harriet was still determined to carry out the raid and free the slaves from Willow Glen Plantation. The team helps her get back up from Colonel Montgomery (Ben Bowen), freeing the slaves and defeating the Confederates. As a result, the Combahee Raid becomes known as the "Willow Glen Plantation Raid." Rufus tells Harriet he wishes he could give her advice to make her life better, but Harriet says she's happy to live free.
- Colonel Ryerson (Kevin Sizemore) is a Rittenhouse sleeper agent in the Confederate army during the Civil War. Emma provides him with a book on Civil War military history so he can ambush the 2nd South Carolina regiment and prevent the Combahee River Raid. Though he ambushes the regiment, he is later found by Wyatt and Rufus at Willow Glen Plantation. He tries to escape with the book, but Rufus burns it, and Ryerson escapes in a panic. He is cornered by the Union army and gunned down by Harriet Tubman.
- Stanley Fisher (Terry Maratos) is a former employee at Mason Industries who was a pilot. He experiences seizures and visions like Jiya, as a result of overcrowding in the Lifeboat. Stanley prefers to stay trapped in his visions, which led to Connor Mason institutionalizing him. Jiya visits him in the mental hospital to better understand her visions. Stanley gives her tips on how to better access them like he does.

==== "Chinatown" ====
- Fei Yunshan (Megan Liu) is a young girl who befriends Jiya during her three-year stay in 1880s Chinatown, San Francisco.
- Feng Yunshan (Evan Lai) is Fei's father who is a photographer who takes Jiya's photo that leads the Lifeboat team to her location. Rittenhouse, however, gets to the timeline first and holds Feng hostage so his daughter would remain mum about Jiya's location.

==== "The Miracle of Christmas" ====
- Joaquin Murrieta (Paul Lincoln Alayo) is a vaquero who was the inspiration for Zorro. He and his gang track down the Lifeboat team and accuse them of stealing his horses, but Jiya proves that he also stole the horses. Murrieta reveals that his people, the Sonorans, discovered gold in California before the Americans drove them out after the Mexican–American War, forcing him to steal horses for a living. One day, a group of American miners accused Murrieta of stealing one of their mules and beat him up, hanged his brother, and raped his wife. The team leads Murrieta and his men to a gold mine; After Flynn kills Jessica and saves Rufus, Murrieta helps Rufus stop the sleeper agent from having the team executed as outlaws. Back in the present day, it is revealed that instead of becoming a notorious killer, Murrieta and his family started a successful horse ranch after striking gold, effectively eliminating the legend of Zorro.
- Young-Hee (Kahyun Kim) is a pregnant Korean history teacher in Usang-ri during the Korean War in 1950. The Lifeboat team meets her in a church while her family meets UN forces to evacuate the town to Hungnam, but she stays back because she's pregnant. Knowing that she'd probably never see her family again if she stayed, the team escorts Young-Hee out of Usang-ri before she goes into labor and Wyatt helps deliver her daughter. They safely arrive in Hungnam, where Young-Hee is reunited with her husband and son. Back in the present day, it is revealed that Young-Hee died in 2007, living a long life, her son Tae-Woo is a retired banker in Seoul, and her daughter became a teacher, as well.
- Dennis Langford (Zach Bostrom) is a U.S. soldier during the Korean War who is bribed by Emma to kill the Lifeboat team in exchange for saving his polio-stricken daughter. The plan backfires when Wyatt fights Langford while he leads them into a trap, causing the helicopter he is piloting to crash and killing Langford.
- Hyung Bong-Hak (Albert Kong) is a Korean doctor who contributes to the successful evacuation of Korean civilians and U.S. soldiers in Hungnam. Lucy and Rufus ask him for assistance when Young-Hee goes into labor.
- Amy Logan (Arabella Grant) is the daughter of Wyatt Logan and Lucy Preston. She is the twin sister of Flynn Logan. Amy is named after Lucy's sister, Amy Preston.
- Flynn Logan (Londyn Regimbal) is the daughter of Wyatt Logan and Lucy Preston. She is the twin sister of Amy Logan. Flynn is named after Garcia Flynn.
