= Marina Wheeler =

British lawyer, writer and columnist (born 1964)

Marina Wheeler KC
- Born: Marina Claire Wheeler; 5 December 1964 (age 61); West Berlin
- Education: Bedales School; European School, Brussels; Fitzwilliam College, Cambridge; Université libre de Bruxelles
- Occupations: Barrister; writer; columnist
- Known for: Queen's Counsel (2016); Spouse of the prime minister of the United Kingdom (2019–2020); Author of The Lost Homestead: My Mother, Partition and the Punjab (2020)
- Spouse: Boris Johnson (m. 1993; div. 2020)
- Children: 4
- Father: Charles Wheeler

Marina Claire Wheeler KC (born 5 December 1964) is a British lawyer and writer. As a barrister, she specialises in public law, including human rights, and is a member of the Bar Disciplinary Tribunal. She was appointed Queen's Counsel in 2016.

She is the author of The Lost Homestead: My Mother, Partition and the Punjab (2020). She was the second wife of former British prime minister Boris Johnson, to whom she was married from 1993 until their divorce in 2020.

== Early life and education ==
Marina Claire Wheeler was born in West Berlin on 5 December 1964, to Charles Wheeler, a BBC correspondent, and his second wife Dip Singh, an Indian Punjabi Sikh. Her elder sister is Shirin Wheeler.

Wheeler was educated at Bedales School and then the European School of Brussels, and then in the early 1980s at Fitzwilliam College, Cambridge, where she wrote for the student magazine Cantab.

At the European School, she became friendly with Boris Johnson, later a journalist and politician.

== Career ==
After Cambridge, Wheeler returned to Brussels and worked there for four years. In 1987, she was called to the Bar, practising from chambers in London at One Crown Office Row. In her work as a barrister, Wheeler specialises in mental health matters and discrimination claims. In January 2004, she was appointed to the B-Panel of Junior Counsel to the Crown. In 2009, she joined the Bar Disciplinary Tribunal as a barrister member.

Of her legal work, Wheeler has stated:

My own experience, shared by many colleagues, is that a high proportion of discrimination cases we deal with are ill-founded. One colleague puts the figure at more than 60 per cent... Many unregulated advisors make a living bringing discrimination claims, and they do not always seem to have the best interests of the Applicant in mind.

In February 2016, she was appointed Queen's Counsel.

In October 2023, she was announced as the Labour Party's advisor on protecting women from workplace sexual harassment and discrimination.

== Personal life ==
On 8 May 1993, a pregnant Wheeler married her childhood friend Boris Johnson, whose previous marriage had ended 12 days earlier. Together they have four children.

In September 2018, Johnson and Wheeler issued a statement confirming that they had separated "several months ago" and begun divorce proceedings. They reached a financial settlement in February 2020, and the divorce was finalised in 2020.

In August 2019, Wheeler revealed that she had been diagnosed with cervical cancer earlier in the year and had undergone two operations to be in remission.

== Memoirs ==
In 2020, Wheeler's memoir The Lost Homestead: My Mother, Partition and the Punjab, detailing her family's history in India, was published. Her ancestry goes back to the city of Sargodha in West Punjab, present-day Pakistan, with her maternal family migrating to present-day India after the Partition of India. It was shortlisted for the 2021 RSL Christopher Bland Prize.

Unofficial roles
Preceded by Philip May	Spouse of the Prime Minister of the United Kingdom; De jure 2019–2020	Vacant Title next held by Carrie Johnson
