= Geraud Brisson =

French-American film and television editor

- Born: France
- Occupation: Editor
- Years active: 2000–present

Geraud Brisson, ACE, is a French-American film and television editor.

== Life and career ==
Brisson was born and raised in France. He later moved to the United States and earned a Master of Fine Arts (MFA) in Cinematography and Film Production from the University of Southern California's School of Cinematic Arts. He started as an assistant editor on films including Jeepers Creepers (2001), The Pursuit of Happyness (2006), and The Great Debaters (2007). He later became a lead editor, with credits including Adventures of Power (2008), Anamorph (2008), and the documentary Inventing Tomorrow (2018).

Brisson edited CODA (2021), directed by Siân Heder, a drama about a hearing teenager in a deaf family that won the Academy Award for Best Picture. His editing used silence in key scenes to reflect the deaf characters' perspectives, drawing on his experience from This Close (2018–2019). He has edited several television series, including The OA (2016), Counterpart (2018–2019), Shantaram (2022), and Lessons in Chemistry (2023). He also served as a consulting producer for all 10 episodes of Shōgun (2024).

== Selected filmography ==
=== Film ===
- 2007 – Anamorph
- 2008 – Adventures of Power
- 2011 – From the Sky Down
- 2012 – The Discoverers
- 2013 – Big Sur
- 2014 – Camp X-Ray

- 2014 – The Yes Men Are Revolting
- 2017 – Anything
- 2021 – CODA
- 2024 – Mother Mother
- 2025 – The Wedding Banquet
- 2026 – Being Heumann

=== Television ===
- 2015 – Looking (4 Episodes)
- 2016 – The OA (3 Episodes)
- 2018-2019 – Counterpart (5 Episodes)
- 2018-2019 – This Close (6 Episodes)

- 2020 – Little America (2 Episodes)
- 2022 – Shantaram (6 Episodes)
- 2023 – Lessons in Chemistry (3 Episodes)
- 2026 – Spider-Noir

== Awards and nominations ==
Year	Result	Award	Category	Work	Ref.
2021	Nominated	San Diego Film Critics Society Awards	Best Editing	CODA	
2024	Nominated	American Cinema Editors Awards	Best Edited Limited Series	Lessons in Chemistry	
