= Susie Alegre =

Manx human rights barrister (born 1971)

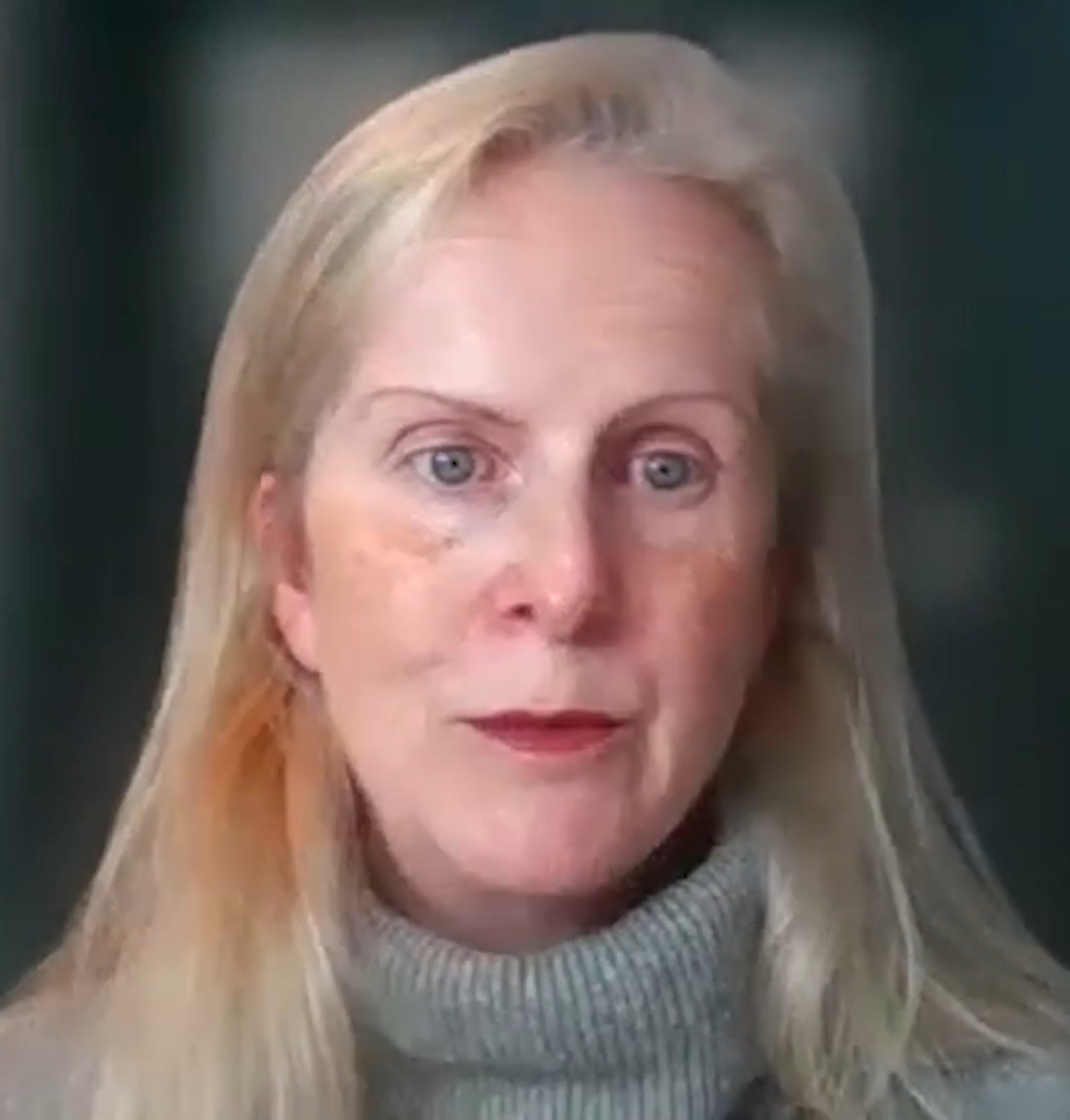
- Alegre in 2022
- Born: Susan Anne Bolton; October 1971 (age 54)
- Education: University of Edinburgh (MA); University of North London (CPE); Inns of Court School of Law (BVC); Nantes University (LLM); University of Roehampton (PhD)
- Website: susiealegre.com

Susan Anne Alegre (née Bolton; born October 1971) is a Manx international human rights barrister and author. She has become known for her work in the field of digital rights. Her book Freedom to Think (2022) was shortlisted for the RSL Christopher Bland Prize and named one of the best technology books of the year by Financial Times.

Alegre is a Senior Fellow of the Centre for International Governance Innovation and an Associate Tenant at Garden Court Chambers. She also founded the Island Rights Initiative.

== Early life and education ==
Alegre grew up on a farm on the northwest coast of the Isle of Man.

Alegre attended Stowe School in England, where she was a member of Nugent. She graduated with a Scottish Master of Arts (MA) in French and Philosophy from the University of Edinburgh in 1993. After graduating from Edinburgh, she spent two years in Spain, during which she taught English and worked as a research assistant at Gernika Gogoratez.

Upon returning to London, Alegre pursued the Common Professional Exam (CPE) in Law at the University of North London in 1996 and the Bar Vocational Course (BVC) at the Inns of Court School of Law in 1997. Alegre later returned to education, completing a Master of Laws (LLM) in International and European Human Rights at the Nantes University in 2019 and a PhD in Human Rights at the University of Roehampton in 2021.

== Career ==
Alegre was called to the Bar of England and Wales in 1997 and joined Three Raymond Buildings, beginning her career in international criminal law and extradition before shifting towards human rights law. She worked for Justice, Amnesty International's EU office and the OSCE. In 2007, Alegre joined Doughty Street Chambers as an Associate Tenant and International Human Rights Consultant.

From 2014 to 2022, Alegre served as Communications Commissioner for the Isle of Man. In 2017, she founded the Island Rights Initiative, a human rights and public international law consultancy for small island jurisdictions. She also served in the Financial Ombudsman Service. She was invited to be an Adjunct Professor at Trinity College Dublin in 2018. and became a Research Fellow at her PhD institution the University of Roehampton.

In 2021, Alegre was appointed a Deputy High Court Judge.

Via three-way auction in 2022, Atlantic Books acquired the rights to publish Alegre's debut non-fiction trade book Freedom to Think: The Long Struggle to Liberate Our Minds. The book was shortlisted for the RSL Christopher Bland Prize and named one of the best technology books of the year by Financial Times.

Alegre reunited with Atlantic Books for the publication of her second non-fiction book Human Rights, Robot Wrongs: Being Human in the Age of AI in 2024. That same year, Alegre joined Garden Street Chambers as an Associate Tenant.

== Bibliography ==
=== Books ===
- Freedom to Think: The Long Struggle to Liberate Our Minds (2022)
- Human Rights, Robot Wrongs: Being Human in the Age of AI (2024)

=== Handbooks and academic books ===
- European Arrest Warrant: A Solution Ahead of Its Time? (2003) with Marisa Leaf
- International Law Aspects of Countering Terrorism (2008)

=== Select chapters ===
- "Lifting the Mask" in Mutual Trust in the European Criminal Areas (2005) edited Gilles de Kerchove and Anne Weyembergh
- "The European Arrest Warrant and the Grounds for Non-execution" and "European Integration and UK Criminal Law" in L'intégration pénale indirecte (2005) edited by Geneviève Giudicelli-Delage and Stefano Manacorda
- "The EU Counter-Terrorism Strategy and Human Rights in Central Asia: Do as I Say Not as I Do?" in Security v Justice: Police and Judicial Cooperation in the EU (2008), edited by Elspeth Guild and Florian Geyer
- "Freedom of thought, belief and religion and freedom of expression and opinion" in Human Rights of Migrants in the 21st Century (2017), edited by Elspeth Guild, Stefanie Grant and C. A. Groenendijk
- "Small State International Financial Centres – A chance to reclaim the high ground on human rights?" in Integration and International Dispute Resolution in Small States (2018), edited by P Butler
