= Catherine Freeman (television producer) =

British television producer (1931–2020)

- Freeman outside the BBC in the 1950s
- Born: Catherine Dove; 10 August 1931; Penang, British Malaya
- Died: 15 July 2020 (aged 88)
- Occupation: TV producer
- Employer(s): BBC and ITV
- Spouses: Charles Wheeler (m. 1958; div. 1962) John Freeman (m. 1962; div. 1976)
- Children: 3

Catherine Sheila Freeman (née Dove, formerly Wheeler; 10 August 1931 – 15 July 2020) was a British TV producer for shows including Panorama and diplomatic hostess.

== Life ==
Freeman was born in Penang.

Her husband returned to the UK and became a producer on the fledgling current affairs series Panorama in 1956. As part of Panorama's team, her husband travelled to Hungary to cover what would become known as the Hungarian Uprising. Taking Panorama's camera into the country, he filmed the jubilant Hungarian reaction to the rebellion. He and Catherine had to persuade the BBC to give the story prominence. Just hours after Wheeler returned to Britain, the Warsaw Pact invaded Hungary and crushed the revolt.

In 1957 she was involved in the BBC April Fools scam where the programme reported on the spaghetti harvest showing the workers picking the spaghetti from the trees where it grew. She took the credit for that and Panorama pushed back other boundaries when it transmitted the first British pictures of a baby being born and the word "fuck" being used.

In 1962 she remarried to a former member of parliament, John Freeman. He was appointed in 1965 as the High Commissioner to India by Harold Wilson's government. He went on to be the British Ambassador to the United States. Freeman gave up television and became a renowned host in New Delhi where she and John had three children. She toured during the Bihar Drought in 1967 writing a report for the UK government. Having seen the results of the drought, she raised funds to build wells. Freeman met many important people, taking a dislike to Richard Nixon.

In 1976 she returned to her television career after she and John Freeman divorced. She went not to the BBC but to Thames Television becoming in time the controller of documentaries. At the Channel Four Television Corporation she obtained their backing for a programme that would follow children from their birth to the age of majority which was titled Citizen 2000. She later served on committees of the Arts council.
