= Peter A. Stott =

British climate scientist

Peter A. Stott MBE FRMetS
- Education: Durham University; University of Cambridge; Imperial College London
- Known for: climate change research
- Awards: Oceanic and Atmospheric Research Outstanding Scientific Paper Award (2008); Climate Science Communications Award (2018)
- Scientific career
- Workplaces: Hadley Centre for Climate Prediction and Research; University of Edinburgh
- Thesis: Effects of physical and chemical processes in storms on reactor accident consequences (1989)
- Website: peterstott.org

Peter A. Stott is a British climate scientist who leads the Climate Monitoring and Attribution team of the Hadley Centre for Climate Prediction and Research at the Met Office in Exeter, UK. He is an expert on anthropogenic and natural causes of climate change.

He was a lead author of the Intergovernmental Panel on Climate Change Working Group I report, chapter 9, for the AR4 released in 2007 and is an editor of the Journal of Climate.

Stott has an undergraduate degree in mathematics from Durham University and completed Part III of the Mathematical Tripos at the University of Cambridge. He was awarded a PhD by Imperial College London for work on atmospheric modelling of the environmental consequences of the Chernobyl disaster. After his PhD, he carried out postdoctoral research at the University of Edinburgh on stratospheric ozone depletion.

In 2021, he published the book Hot Air: the Inside Story of the Battle Against Climate Change Denial, a thorough account of the decades-long battle to deny or downplay the existence of the climate crisis. He was shortlisted for the 2022 RSL Christopher Bland Prize for the book.
