= Bonnie Garmus =

American author and former copywriter (born 1957)

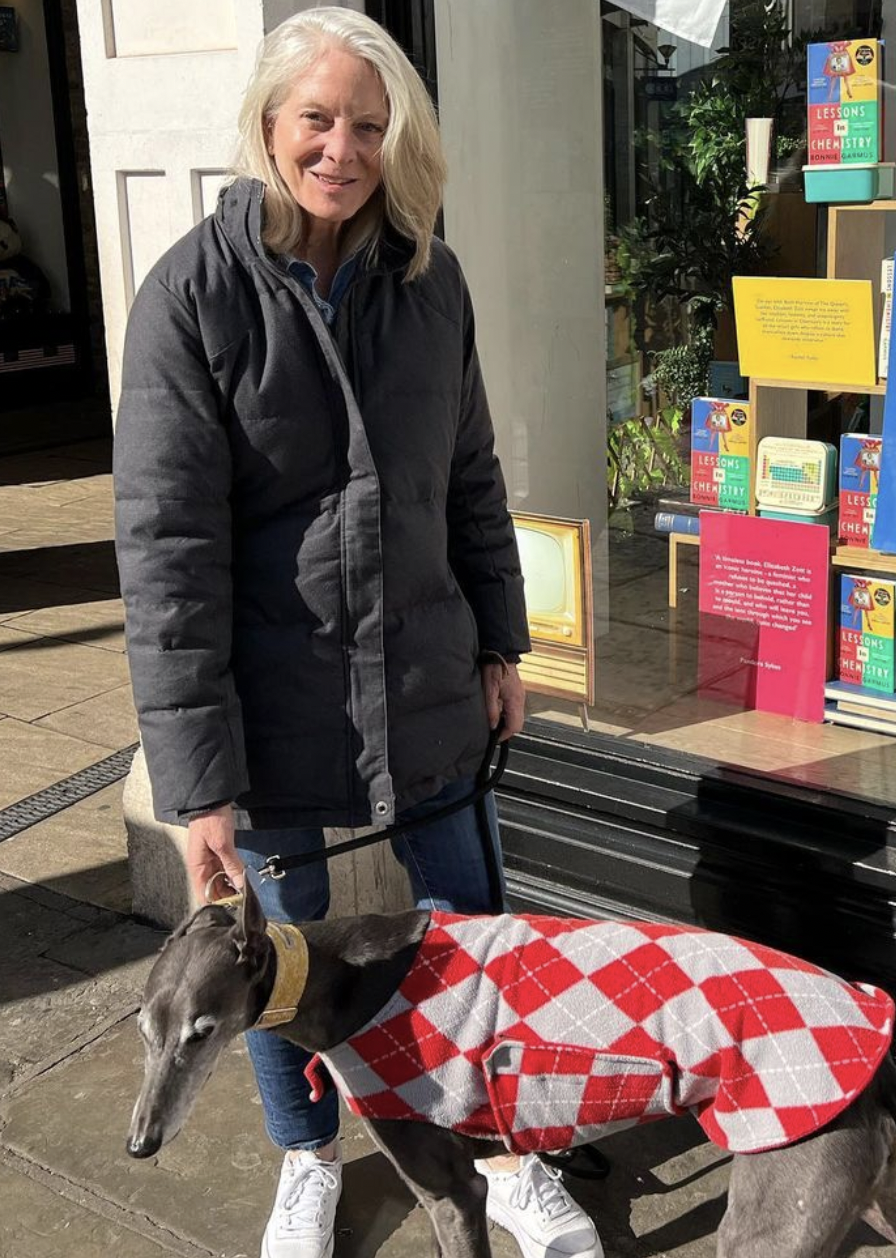
- Garmus with her dog in 2023
- Born: April 18, 1957 (age 69); Riverside, California, U.S.
- Education: University of California, Santa Cruz
- Occupation: Novelist
- Writing career
- Genre: Fiction
- Notable work: Lessons in Chemistry
- Website: bonniegarmus.com

Bonnie Jean Garmus (born April 18, 1957) is an American author and former copywriter.

== Biography ==
Garmus is from Seattle. She received her Bachelor's degree in creative writing/aesthetic studies from University of California, Santa Cruz. She has worked as a copywriter and creative director in the US, and has lived in Switzerland and Colombia. She currently resides in the UK.

In April 2022, her debut novel, Lessons in Chemistry, was published. The Guardian noted its "polished, funny, thought-provoking story ... it's hard to believe it's a debut". The New York Times commented on its "entertaining subplots and witty dialogue". Olimpia Mamula Steiner, a professor of chemistry, praised the book profusely: "Once you start it will be difficult to put down, as soon as you finish a chapter you immediately want to read the next one, it's almost addictive."

As of November 2023, Lessons in Chemistry had been sold into 42 territories and has a television adaptation on Apple TV+ starring Brie Larson. Éditions Robert Laffont published a French translation in May 2022 under the title La Brillante destinée d'Elizabeth Zott. Among the prizes Garmus has won are British Book Awards Author of the Year 2023, Waterstones Author of the Year 2022, the Paul Torday Memorial Prize for a first novel by an author over 60, and Forbes Magazine's 50 over 50 Europe, Middle East And Africa 2024. The book was shortlisted for the 2023 RSL Christopher Bland Prize.

Garmus enjoys open-water swimming and has rowed competitively.

Her second novel, Peck & Peck, about a young man who is hired by a "prestigious and secretive" poetry journal, was released in October 2026.

== Awards and recognition ==
- British Book Awards Author of the Year 2023
- Waterstones Author of the Year 2022
- Barnes & Noble Book of the Year 2022
- ABIA (Australia) International Book of the Year 2023
- The Queen's Reading Room selection (selected by Queen Camilla)
- Books Are My Bag Readers' Awards 2023: Breakthrough Author and Readers' Choice

== Publications ==
- Bonnie Garmus (2022). Lessons in Chemistry (hardcover 1st ed.). New York: Doubleday. ISBN 978-0385-54734-5.
- Garmus, Bonnie (2026). Peck & Peck. New York: Scribner. ISBN 978-1-6682-5106-5. OCLC 1575280433.
