= The Other Man (2008 film) =

Film by Richard Eyre

- Directed by: Richard Eyre
- Screenplay by: Richard Eyre; Charles Wood
- Based on: The Other Man by Bernhard Schlink
- Produced by: Frank Doelger; Michael Dreyer; Tracey Scoffield
- Starring: Liam Neeson; Antonio Banderas; Laura Linney; Romola Garai
- Cinematography: Haris Zambarloukos
- Edited by: Tariq Anwar
- Music by: Stephen Warbeck
- Production company: Rainmark Films
- Distributed by: Metrodome Distribution (United Kingdom); Image Entertainment (United States)
- Release dates: 7 September 2008 (TIFF); 11 September 2009
- Running time: 84 minutes
- Countries: United Kingdom; United States
- Language: English
- Box office: $2.1 million

The Other Man is a 2008 psychological thriller film directed by Richard Eyre. It stars Liam Neeson and Antonio Banderas as competitors for a woman's (Laura Linney) love.

== Plot ==
Lisa, from the United States, is a shoe designer, married for 25 years to Peter Ryman, a software CEO from Northern Ireland. They live in Cambridge, and Lisa frequently travels to Milan on business. Peter disapproves of their daughter Abigail's boyfriend, George, and Lisa makes an oblique attempt to discuss her and Peter's monogamy, which he dismisses.

After Lisa dies, Abigail gives Peter a note with the message "Lake Como" from inside one of her mother's shoes. Peter discovers a romantic voicemail on Lisa's cell phone and a similar email on her computer from "Ralph", as well as a password-protected folder named "Love". Convinced that Lisa was having an affair, Peter wrongly accuses her colleague of the same name of being her lover. He replies to the email, “The Lisa you loved is no longer here,” but Ralph continues to write, believing he is still communicating with Lisa. Peter accesses Lisa's folder with the password “Lake Como,” discovering intimate pictures of her in Milan with another man. He has an employee illegally trace Ralph's IP address, revealing his physical address in Milan.

Peter travels to Milan and follows the half-Spanish, half-English cosmopolitan Ralph Cortés, striking up a conversation with him at a chess café. Over several meetings, Ralph – unaware of Peter's true identity – explains his twelve-year-long affair with Lisa. Having fallen in love with her despite knowing she was married, Ralph believes Lisa will soon rekindle their relationship. Concerned about her father, Abigail finds Ralph's messages and calls Ralph on Lisa's phone, confirming the affair. She confronts Peter in Milan, realizing he has become dangerously obsessed. Fixated on revenge, Peter goes to Ralph's apartment and discovers he is not the wealthy man he appears, but an impoverished building superintendent. Having previously prepared to kill Ralph, Peter changes his mind and leaves.

Posing as Lisa, Peter emails Ralph, asking him to meet her at Lake Como. Ralph excitedly informs Peter, who gives him money to throw Lisa a lavish dinner party in London to seal their relationship. Buying expensive new clothes, Ralph arrives at the Villa d'Este to reunite with Lisa, only to be met by Peter, who reveals that he was Lisa's husband and that she died of cancer. In flashbacks, as Peter and Abigail care for the dying Lisa, Peter asks her to write down the place where she was happiest; Lisa writes down “Lake Como” for Peter to find, and has Abigail hide the note in one of the shoes she was wearing when she first met Ralph. Admitting that his pretensions of wealth are a lie, Ralph explains that Lisa knew the truth and paid off his debts, declaring that she truly loved him, and Peter leaves.

Back home, Peter decides to attend the dinner Ralph has arranged to celebrate Lisa, and invites Abigail and George. With Lisa's friends and loved ones gathered, Peter swallows his anger at Ralph and gives a heartfelt toast to his wife's memory, reconciling with Abigail and finally welcoming George to their family. As Ralph starts a new life as a hospital orderly in London, Peter and Abigail – having finally found closure in Lisa's death – return home.

== Cast ==
- Liam Neeson as Peter
- Antonio Banderas as Ralph
- Laura Linney as Lisa
- Romola Garai as Abigail
- Craig Parkinson as George
- Paterson Joseph as Ralph
- Pam Ferris as Vera
- Richard Graham as Eric
- Emma Fielding as Gail
- Amanda Drew as Joy
- Paul Ritter as Guy

== Production ==
Principal photography took place in early 2008 in the United Kingdom and Italy.

== Release ==
The Other Man premiered at the 2008 Toronto International Film Festival on 7 September 2008. It had a limited released in the United States on 11 September 2009. It was released on DVD and Blu-ray in the United Kingdom on 2 November 2009, and in the United States on 15 December 2009.

== Reception ==
The film received negative reviews from Variety, The Hollywood Reporter, and The Houston Chronicle. On the review aggregator website Rotten Tomatoes, 16% of 38 critics' reviews are positive, with an average rating of 4/10. The website's consensus reads: "Despite the best efforts of a talented cast, The Other Man is talky, witless, and tension-free." Metacritic, which uses a weighted average, assigned the film a score of 34 out of 100, based on 8 critics, indicating "generally unfavorable" reviews.
