= Paterson Joseph =

English actor and author (born 1964)

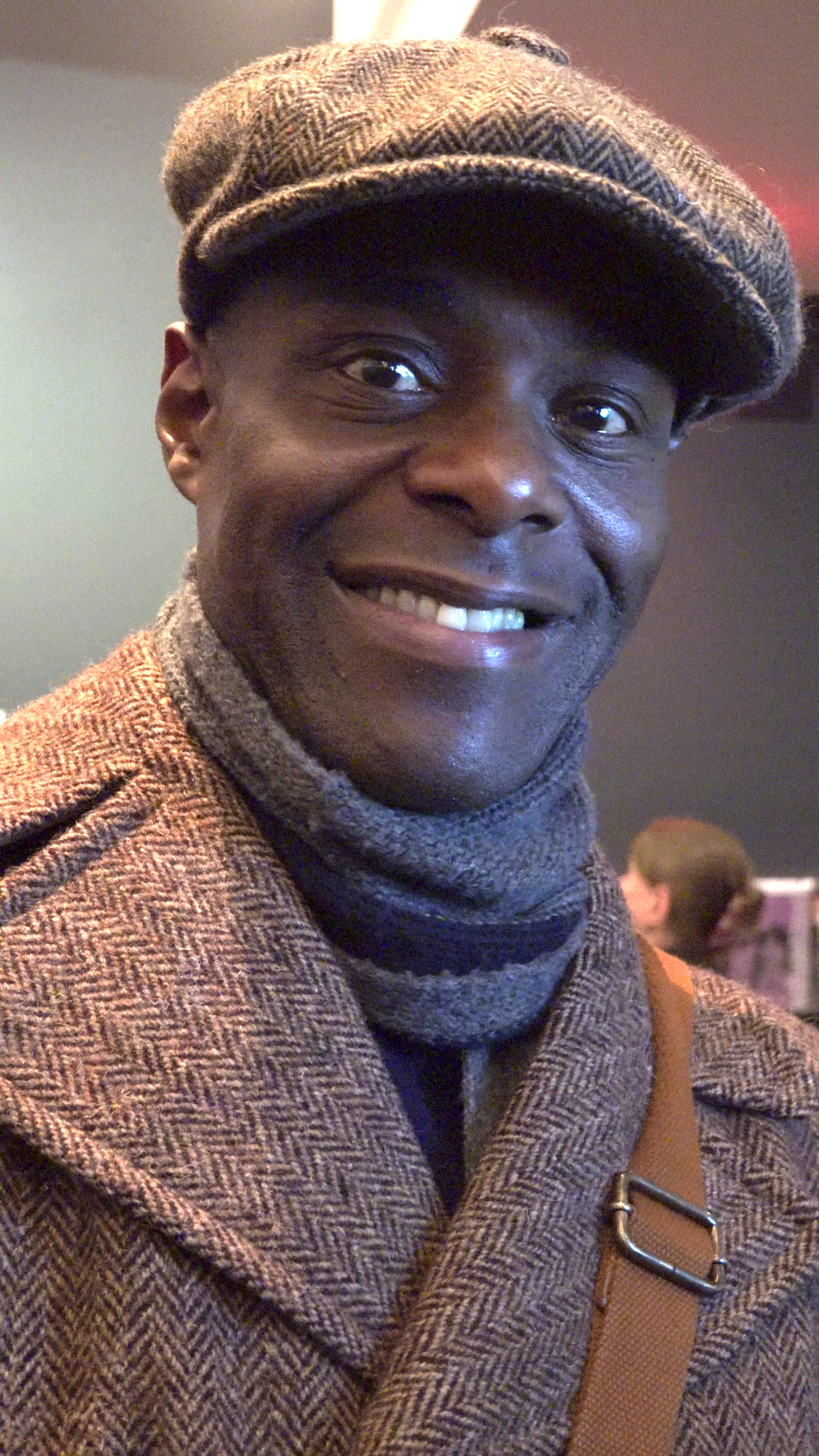
- Joseph at the reception for Sancho at the Brooklyn Academy of Music in 2015
- Born: Paterson Davis Joseph; 22 June 1964 (age 62); Willesden, Middlesex, England
- Education: London Academy of Music and Dramatic Art
- Occupations: Actor; author
- Years active: 1989–present
- Notable work: The Secret Diaries of Charles Ignatius Sancho (2022)
- Office: Chancellor of Oxford Brookes University
- Spouse: Emmanuelle Joseph
- Children: 1
- Awards: RSL Christopher Bland Prize

Paterson Davis Joseph (born 22 June 1964) is a English actor and author.

Joseph began his career in the Royal Shakespeare Company (RSC) productions of King Lear and Love's Labour's Lost (1990). On television, he is known for his roles in the BBC One series Casualty (1997–1998) and Survivors (2008–2010); the Channel 4 series Peep Show (2003–2015) and Green Wing (2004–2006); the ITV series Boy Meets Girl (2009), Law & Order: UK (2013–2014) and Safe House (2015–2017); the HBO series The Leftovers (2014–2015); and the NBC series Timeless (2016–2018). Vigil (BBC One 2021-2023) His films include The Beach (2000), Greenfingers (2000), Æon Flux (2005), The Other Man (2008) and Wonka (2023).

Joseph is also a writer. His debut novel The Secret Diaries of Charles Ignatius Sancho (2022) won the 2023 Christopher Bland Prize awarded by the Royal Society of Literature. He was announced as Chancellor of Oxford Brookes University in October 2022.

== Early life ==
Joseph was born on 22 June 1964 in Willesden Green, Middlesex, to parents from Saint Lucia. He was the youngest of five, including an elder brother and three sisters in between. His mother spoke Creole until Joseph was three when she stopped suddenly. He attended Cardinal Hinsley R.C. High School in north-west London, a predominantly Irish Catholic school. He has described himself as a "terrible bunker" while at school, opting to spend the best part of two years in the local public library instead.

Joseph worked briefly as a catering assistant at a hospital, before deciding to pursue acting as a profession. He first trained at the Studio '68 of Theatre Arts, London (South Kensington Library), from 1983 to 1985 with Robert Henderson. He later attended the London Academy of Music and Dramatic Art (LAMDA), before going on to perform for the Royal Shakespeare Company and The Royal National Theatre.

== Career ==
=== Theatre ===
In 1991, Joseph won second prize in the Ian Charleson Awards, for his 1990 performances of Oswald in King Lear, Dumaine in Love's Labour's Lost, and the Marquis de Mota in The Last Days of Don Juan, all at the Royal Shakespeare Company. In 1992, he starred as Richard Henry in Blues for Mister Charlie by James Baldwin, directed by Greg Hersov at the Royal Exchange, Manchester.

Joseph's theatre credits include the title role in Othello at the Royal Exchange, Manchester, as well as parts in Henry IV, King Lear, and Hamlet for a performance in New York City. In 2012, he played Brutus in a performance by the RSC of Julius Caesar set in Africa. In 2004, he undertook a project, filmed for Channel 4 in a documentary entitled My Shakespeare, to direct a version of Romeo & Juliet, using 20 young non-actors from the deprived Harlesden area of London.

In 2006, he became a patron of OffWestEnd.com, a listings site for theatre outside the mainstream. Other stage appearances in 2006 and 2007 include the leads in The Royal Hunt of the Sun and The Emperor Jones at the Olivier Theatre, London. In 2015, Sancho: An Act of Remembrance, a solo play written and performed by Joseph and based on the life of Ignatius Sancho, was staged in Oxford and Birmingham, and toured in the US starting in October.

In late 2019 and early 2020, Joseph starred as Ebenezer Scrooge at the Old Vic Theatre in London in their production of A Christmas Carol.

=== Television ===
He has played many roles in British television programmes, both drama and comedy. These include Reuben in William and Mary, alongside Martin Clunes; Mark Grace in Casualty; the Marquis de Carabas in Neverwhere; Alan Johnson in Peep Show; Lyndon Jones in Green Wing; and Shorty in the first episode of Jericho.

Joseph also appeared in the acclaimed drama Sex Traffic (2004), in the 2005 TV version of Kwame Kwei-Armah's acclaimed play Elmina's Kitchen and in the Doctor Who episodes "Bad Wolf" and "The Parting of the Ways" as Rodrick, a contestant on a futuristic version of The Weakest Link game show. He has also appeared in various supporting roles in Dead Ringers. In 2006, he appeared in the television sketch show That Mitchell and Webb Look, in which he played Simon, a contestant on the game show Numberwang.

In 2007, Joseph played Space Marshall Clarke in two series of the BBC sci-fi sitcom Hyperdrive, and was Benjamin Maddox in the BBC drama series Jekyll. Joseph also provided the voice of K.O. Joe in Chop Socky Chooks.

From 2008 to 2010, Joseph played Greg Preston in Survivors, the BBC remake of the 1970s science-fiction drama of the same name. Also in 2008, Joseph appeared as former hitman Patrick Finch in Series 1, Episode 5 of The Fixer.

Joseph played DI Wes Layton in Law & Order: UK from 2013 to 2014.

He played the messianic "Holy Wayne" Gilchrest on the original HBO dramatic series The Leftovers, which began airing in 2014, and General Arnold Gaines on You, Me and the Apocalypse.

He took up the main role of Connor Mason in the television series Timeless, which ended in 2018.

In 2020, Joseph played the part of Home Secretary Kamal Hadley in the series of Noughts + Crosses.

As voice actor, Joseph provided the narration for the National Geographic series Mega Cities from 2005 to 2011, Wild Russia in 2009 and the BBC Two documentary Inside Obama's White House in 2016. He played Tyler in the BBC Switch film Rules of Love in 2010.

=== Film ===
Joseph's first feature film role was as Benbay in Jim Sheridan's In the Name of the Father.

In 2000, Joseph appeared as Keaty in Danny Boyle's adventure drama film The Beach, which starred Leonardo DiCaprio. In the same year, he also appeared in The Long Run and Greenfingers.

In 2005, he portrayed Giroux in the science-fiction action film Æon Flux, which starred Charlize Theron. Then in 2008 he played a supporting role in The Other Man, opposite Liam Neeson and Antonio Banderas.

Joseph appears as villain Arthur Slugworth, part of an ensemble cast in the 2023 musical fantasy film Wonka, directed by Paul King.

Joseph has also appeared in several short films, including Stop the World, directed by Richard Leaf. He voiced the character of Victor in the 2023 drama short film Bet Your Bottom Dollar produced by British-Canadian filmmaker Jonathan Tammuz.

=== Voice work ===
In 2011, Joseph returned to Doctor Who, where he appeared in the audio drama Earth Aid, playing Victor Espinosa. In November 2016, he played the title role in the BBC radio adaptation of the short story by Neil Gaiman, How the Marquis Got His Coat Back. Joseph had previously played the part of the Marquis de Carabas in the 1996 BBC TV six-part drama Neverwhere. He played the role of Colonel Arbuthnott in the Audible production of Murder on the Orient Express.

Joseph read the BBC Radio 4 10-part abridgement (by Florence Bedell) of Barbadian writer George Lamming's 1953 debut novel In the Castle of My Skin, first broadcast in December 2020.

=== Lectures ===
Joseph has delivered such keynote public lectures as the Memorial 2007 Annual Lecture at the Institute of Commonwealth Studies and at Lancaster University.

=== Writing ===
In October 2022, Joseph's debut novel The Secret Diaries of Charles Ignatius Sancho was released, published by Dialogue Books. The book charts the life of Charles Ignatius Sancho through fictionalised diary entries, letters and commentary. Writing in The New York Times, reviewer Thomas Mallon concluded: "With the conjuring tricks of historical fiction, Joseph has taken an actual man and, two and a half centuries later, made him as thoroughly himself, and as fully present, as he was the first time round." The novel was shortlisted for the 2023 Jhalak Prize, and won the 2023 RSL Christopher Bland Prize. Joseph was also a contributor to the 2024 book Encounters with James Baldwin: Celebrating 100 Years.

=== Chancellor of Oxford Brookes University ===
In October 2022, Joseph was announced as the next Chancellor of Oxford Brookes University (previous holders of the role including Helena Kennedy, Jon Snow, Shami Chakrabarti and Katherine Grainger) and was officially installed in May 2023.

== Personal life ==
Joseph lived in the Loire Valley, France, with his French ex-wife Emmanuelle and their son, before moving back to his native London. He supports the Brazil national football team.

== Acting credits ==
Key
| † | Denotes films that have not yet been released |

=== Film ===
| Year | Title | Role | Director | Notes |
|---|---|---|---|---|
| 1993 | In the Name of the Father | Benbay | Jim Sheridan | Docudrama / Legal Drama / True Crime / Tragedy |
| 2000 | The Long Run | Gasa | Jean Stewart | Drama / Sport |
| 2000 | The Beach | Keaty | Danny Boyle | Adventure / Romance / Thriller / Drama |
| 2000 | Greenfingers | Jimmy | Joel Hershman | True Crime / Comedy / Drama / Romance |
| 2004 | The Baby Juice Express | Sean Boetang | Michael Hurst | Comedy / Crime |
| 2005 | Æon Flux | Giroux | Karyn Kusama | Adventure / Action / Superhero |
| 2008 | The Other Man | Ralph | Richard Eyre | |
| 2011 | Stop the World | Pat | Richard Leaf | Short film |
| 2012 | Julius Caesar | Brutus | Gregory Doran | Filmed stage play |
| 2015 | Between Lambs and Lions | President Nebuchadnezzar | Ted Wilkes | Short film |
| 2015 | Rise and Fall of the City of Mahagonny | Narrator | Rhodri Huw | Music |
| 2019 | Since Yesterday | Old friend | Alexander Bradley | Short film |
| 2022 | Daddy's Girl | Saul | Jessica Magaye | Short film |
| 2022 | Geronimo | Doctor | Geraint Morgan | Short film |
| 2023 | Bet Your Bottom Dollar | Victor | Brandon Ashplant | Short film |
| 2023 | The Velveteen Rabbit | King | Jennifer Perrott and Rick Thiele | Short film |
| 2023 | Wonka | Arthur Slugworth | Paul King | Musical Fantasy |
| 2026 | They Will Kill You | Ray Woodhouse | Kirill Sokolov | Action / Comedy / Horror |

=== Television ===
| Year | Title | Role | Notes |
|---|---|---|---|
| 1989 | Streetwise | Dave | 9 episodes |
| 1990 | South of the Border | Julian Henry | Episode 2.7 |
| 1992 | Bunch of Five | Compton | Episode: "Dead at Thirty" |
| 1992 | The Bill | Michael Tapscott | Episode: "Soft Target" |
| 1992 | Between the Lines | Sgt. Viv Jones | Episode: "Words of Advice" |
| 1993 | ScreenPlay | Busi | Episode: "Not Even God Is Wise Enough" |
| 1994 | Funky Black Shorts | Ellis | Episode: "Home and Away" |
| 1994 | Soldier Soldier | Fusilier Eddie Nelson | Episode: "Changing the Guard" |
| 1994 | Casualty | Michael | Episode: "Hidden Agendas" |
| 1996 | Neverwhere | Marquis de Carabas | 6 episodes |
| 1997–1998 | Casualty | Mark Grace | 42 episodes |
| 2000 | Safe as Houses | Gabriel James | TV movie |
| 2001 | Armadillo | Alan | 3 episodes |
| 2001 | Now You See Her | Mark | TV movie |
| 2001 | Cold Feet | Suggs | Episodes: 4.5 and 4.6 |
| 2002 | Waking the Dead | Dermot Sullivan | Episodes: "Life Sentence Part 1" and "Life Sentence Part 2" |
| 2002 | Silent Witness | Sergeant Terry Harding | Episodes: "The Fall Out Part 1" and "The Fall Out Part 2" |
| 2002 | Bodily Harm | Undertaker Two | 1 episode |
| 2003 | Loving You | Felix Fisher | TV movie |
| 2003 | A Touch of Frost | Colin Stokes | Episode: "Close Encounters" |
| 2003 | Ghosts of Albion: Legacy | Nigel Townsend | 7 episodes |
| 2003–2005 | William and Mary | Reuben | 10 episodes |
| 2003–2015 | Peep Show | Alan Johnson | 16 episodes |
| 2004 | Murphy's Law | Dr. Mark Maddison | Episode: "The Group" |
| 2004 | Dead Ringers | Mickey Stone | 2 episodes |
| 2004 | Ghost of Albion: Embers | Nigel Townsend | 5 episodes |
| 2004 | Sex Traffic | Martin | 2 episodes |
| 2004 | My Dad's the Prime Minister | Detective Gary McRyan | 6 episodes |
| 2004 | My Shakespeare | Self | TV movie documentary |
| 2004–2006 | Green Wing | Lyndon Jones | 9 episodes |
| 2005 | Dalziel and Pascoe | Mr Alisdair Collinson | Episodes: "Heads You Lose Part 1" and "Heads You Lose Part 2" |
| 2005 | Elmina's Kitchen | Deli | TV movie |
| 2005 | Doctor Who | Rodrick | Episodes: "Bad Wolf" and "The Parting of the Ways" |
| 2005 | Rose and Maloney | Harry Callaghan | Episode: "Carl Callaghan" |
| 2005 | Jericho | Shorty | Episode: "A Pair of Ragged Claws" |
| 2005 | Open Wide | Neil | TV movie |
| 2006 | Mayo | Dr. Rossi | Episode: "Cast a Cold Eye" |
| 2006–2007 | Hyperdrive | Space Marshal Clarke | 7 episodes |
| 2006–2008 | That Mitchell and Webb Look | Various characters | 8 episodes |
| 2007 | Jekyll | Benjamin Lennox | 4 episodes |
| 2007–2008 | Mega Cities | Narrator | Episodes: "Hong Kong" and "Taipei" |
| 2007–2008 | Chop Socky Chooks | KO Joe | 26 episodes |
| 2008 | The Fixer | Patrick Finch | Series 1, Episode 5 |
| 2008 | Thrilla in Manila | Narrator | TV movie documentary |
| 2008-2009 | World of Quest | General Ogun | 26 episodes |
| 2008–2010 | Survivors | Greg Preston | 12 episodes |
| 2009 | Japan's Wild Secrets | Narrator | Tv movie documentary |
| 2009 | The No. 1 Ladies' Detective Agency | Cephas Buthelezi | Episodes: "Beauty and Integrity" and "A Real Botswana Diamond" |
| 2009 | Boy Meets Girl | Jay Metcalfe | 4 episodes |
| 2009 | 10 Minute Tales | Paul | Episode: "Let It Snow" |
| 2010 | Blood and Oil | Ed Daly | TV movie |
| 2010 | Clash of the Continents | Narrator | Episode: "End of Eden" |
| 2010 | Rules of Love | Tyler | TV movie |
| 2010 | On Christmas Night | Presenter | Reading from the Gospel of John |
| 2011 | Case Histories | Patrick Carter | 2 episodes |
| 2011 | Coming Up: Food | English man | 1 episode |
| 2011 | Death in Paradise | William | Season 1 episode 2 Wicked Wedding Night |
| 2012 | The Hollow Crown Henry V | Duke of York | TV film |
| 2012 | Julius Caesar | Brutus | Live recording performance by RSC |
| 2012 | Hustle | Dexter Gold | Series 8, Episode 1 |
| 2012 | In Love with... | Sir Robert Chiltern | Episode: "In Love with Wilde" |
| 2013 | Wild Thailand | Narrator | 2 episodes |
| 2013 | Wild Burma: Nature's Lost Kingdom | Narrator | 3 episodes |
| 2013–2014 | Law & Order: UK | DCI Wes Leyton | Series 7–8 |
| 2014 | Babylon | Assistant Commissioner Charles Inglis | Series 1 |
| 2014-2015 | The Leftovers | "Holy" Wayne Gilchrest | Season 1 Season 2, two episodes |
| 2015 | Thunderbirds Are Go | Robert Williams (voice) | 1 episode |
| 2015 | You, Me and the Apocalypse | General Arnold Gaines | Main Role |
| 2015 | Safe House | Mark | |
| 2016 | Inside Obama's White House | Narrator | 4 episodes |
| 2016 | The Coopers vs the Rest | Toby | Pilot episode |
| 2016–2018 | Timeless | Connor Mason | 26 episodes |
| 2017 | Rellik | Dr Isaac Taylor | 6 episodes |
| 2018 | The Prosecutors: Real Crime and Punishment | Narrator | Episodes: "Modern Day Slavery" and "Prisons, Drugs and Drones" |
| 2018 | Urban Myths | Chuck D | Episode: "Public Enemy (feat Kev Wells)" |
| 2019 | Grantchester | Reverend Nathaniel Todd | 1 episode |
| 2019 | Counterpart | Elan | Episode: "You to You" |
| 2019 | The End of the F***ing World | Kevan | 1 episode |
| 2019 | Avenue 5 | Harrison Ames | 2 episodes |
| 2020 | Unprecedented | George | 1 episode |
| 2020 | Noughts + Crosses | Prime Minister Kamal Hadley | 10 episodes |
| 2021 | Inside No. 9 | Pantalone | Episode: “Wuthering Heist” |
| 2021 | The Mosquito Coast | Calaca | 2 episodes |
| 2021 | Vigil | Commander Neil Newsome, Captain of HMS Vigil | 6 episodes |
| 2022 | That Dirty Black Bag | Thompson | 8 episodes |
| 2022 | Unearthed Narratives | Himself | TV mini series |
| 2023 | Boat Story | Samuel | TV mini series |
| 2025 | Wolf King | Duke Bergan | Voice role, 8 episodes |
| TBA | Tomb Raider | TBA | Filming |

=== Theatre ===
| Year | Play | Role | Venue | Notes |
|---|---|---|---|---|
| 1987–88 | Raping the Gold | Leon | Bush Theatre | |
| 1988-89 | The Tempest | Adrian | Donmar Warehouse | |
| 1989 | Whale | 1st Inuit Lover | Lyttelton Theatre, National Theatre | |
| 1989 | Soloman & the Big Cat | Soloman | The Young Vic | |
| 1990 | The Last Days of Don Juan | Marquis de Mota | Swan Theatre | Press performance; second prize in the Ian Charleson Awards |
| 1990 | Troilus and Cressida | Patroclus | Swan Theatre | Press performance |
| 1990 | King Lear | Oswald | Royal Shakespeare Theatre | Second prize in the Ian Charleson Awards |
| 1990 | Love's Labour's Lost | Dumaine | Royal Shakespeare Theatre | Second prize in the Ian Charleson Awards |
| 1990-91 | The Last Days of Don Juan | Marquis de Mota | Barbican Theatre | |
| 1990-91 | Love's Labour's Lost | Dumaine | Barbican Theatre | |
| 1990-91 | King Lear | Oswald | Barbican Theatre | |
| 1991 | King Lear | Oswald | Theatre Royal, Newcastle | Press performance |
| 1991 | The Last Days of Don Juan | Marquis de Mota | Newcastle Playhouse | Press performance |
| 1991 | Love's Labour's Lost | Dumaine | Newcastle Playhouse | |
| 1991 | Troilus and Cressida | Patroclus | Newcastle Playhouse | Press performance |
| 1991 | Love's Labour's Lost | Dumaine | Barbican Theatre | Press performance |
| 1991 | The Last Days of Don Juan | Marquis de Mota | Pit London | Press performance |
| 1991 | King Lear | Oswald | Barbican Theatre | Press performance |
| 1991 | Troilus and Cressida | Troilus | Pit London | Taking over Troilus from Ralph Fiennes; press performance |
| 1991 | The Pretenders | Haakon | Pit London | Press performance |
| 1991–92 | The Pretenders | Haakon | Barbican Theatre | |
| 1992 | The Recruiting Officer | Mr Worthy | Olivier Theatre | |
| 1992 | Blues for Mister Charlie | Richard Henry | Royal Exchange, Manchester | |
| 1995 | Hamlet | Horatio | Hackney Empire and Belasco Theatre | |
| 1996–97 | Henry IV Part I and Part II | Henry Percy / Pistol | Theatre Royal, Bath and The Old Vic | UK tour |
| 2000 | A Doll's House | Torvald | Ambassadors Theatre, London | |
| 2001 | Les Blancs | Tshembe Matoseh | Royal Exchange, Manchester | Best Actor, Barclays TMA Awards 2001 |
| 2002 | Othello | Othello | Royal Exchange, Manchester | |
| 2003 | Elmina's Kitchen | Deli | Cottesloe Theatre | |
| 2005 | The Emperor Jones | Brutus Jones, Emperor | Gate Theatre | |
| 2006 | The Royal Hunt of the Sun | Atahualpa | Olivier Theatre | |
| 2007 | The Emperor Jones | Brutus Jones, Emperor | Olivier Theatre | |
| 2007 | Saint Joan | Cauchon | Olivier Theatre | |
| 2012 | Julius Caesar | Brutus | Royal Shakespeare Theatre | Set in Africa; live recording performance by RSC |
| 2015 | Sancho: An Act of Remembrance | Charles Ignatius Sancho | Oxford, Birmingham and US tour | A one-man show conceived, written and performed by himself |
| 2019-20 | A Christmas Carol | Ebenezer Scrooge | The Old Vic | |

=== Audio and radio ===
| Year | Play | Role | Station | Notes |
|---|---|---|---|---|
| 1998 | Twelfth Night | Feste | Arkangel Complete Shakespeare | |
| 1999 | Titus Andronicus | Aaron | Arkangel Complete Shakespeare | |
| 2005 | Troilus and Cressida | Troilus | BBC Radio 3 | |
| 2007 | Doctor Faustus | Faustus | BBC Radio 3 | |
| 2011 | Earth Aid | Victor Espinosa | BBC radio | Doctor Who spin-off produced by Big Finish Productions |
| 2016 | How the Marquis Got His Coat Back | Marquis de Carabas | BBC radio | Reprising his role from the 1996 BBC TV six-part drama Neverwhere. |
| 2016 | Strangeness in Space | The Puppetmaster | Podcast series | 1 episode |
| 2017 | Murder on the Orient Express | Colonel Arbuthnott | Amazon | |
| 2020 | In the Castle of My Skin | Narrator | BBC Radio 4 | |
| 2020-21 | The Sandman | The Demon Choronzon | Podcast series | 21 episodes |
| 2021 | Michael Spicer: Before Next Door | Charlie Roland | BBC Radio series | 1 episode, “Silver Badge”. |
| 2021 | Getting Better - The Fight for the NHS | King George VI | Podcast series | 2 episodes |
| 2022 | Chelmsford 123: The Revival | Functio | Podcast series | 3 episodes |
| 2022 | Severus | Septimius Severus | BBC Radio 4 | |
| 2025-present | Just a Minute | Contestant | BBC Radio 4 | |

== Awards and nominations ==
| Year | Body | Award | Nominated work | Result | Ref |
|---|---|---|---|---|---|
| 2023 | EdiPlay International Film Festival, Paris | Best Supporting Actor | Bet Your Bottom Dollar | Won | |
| 2024 | New York Movie Awards | Gold Award - Actor | Bet Your Bottom Dollar | Won | |
| 2024 | Paris Film Awards | Silver Award - Actor | Bet Your Bottom Dollar | Won | |
