= AJ Pearce =

English author (born 1964)

- Born: Amanda-Jane Pearce; 1964 (age 61–62)
- Education: University of Sussex
- Occupation: Writer
- Writing career
- Genre: Historical fiction
- Website: ajpearce.com

Amanda-Jane Pearce (born 1964) is an English author. She is known for her Sunday Times Bestselling historical fiction series The Emmy Lake Chronicles, beginning with Dear Mrs Bird in 2018.

== Life and career ==
Pearce is from Hampshire. She attended secondary school in Basingstoke. She went on to graduate with a Bachelor of Arts degree in American Studies and History from the University of Sussex. She studied abroad in the United States at Northwestern University in Illinois. She worked in entertainment marketing and publishing for an engineering magazine before going into writing, a hobby she enjoyed as a child and rediscovered in 2005. She honed her creative writing skills through classes with the Arvon Foundation.

Pearce was inspired to write Dear Mrs Bird by a women's magazine from 1939 she stumbled upon back in 2011. She began collecting wartime magazines to form the premise of her World War II London-set novel. Following a bidding auction, Pearce landed a two-book publishing deal with Picador in 2016 with potential for more. Scribner won the U.S. side of the deal. In advance of Dear Mrs Bird's release date, 42 optioned the novel for television.

Dear Mrs Bird was published in April 2018 and became a Sunday Times Bestseller. It was shortlisted at the 2019 British Book Awards and for the RSL Christopher Bland Prize. Its sequel, Yours Cheerfully, followed in summer 2021. It was also a Times Bestseller. In an interview with My Weekly, Pearce discussed her plans for the series to follow the lead character Emmy through the war. The third book in the series, Mrs Porter Calling is set in 1943, and was published in 2023, with a fourth and last book in the series, Dear Miss Lake, released in July 2025.

== Bibliography ==
=== The Emmy Lake Chronicles ===
- Dear Mrs Bird (2018)
- Yours Cheerfully (2021)
- Mrs Porter Calling (2023)
- Dear Miss Lake (2025)
