= Lessons in Chemistry (miniseries) =

2023 television miniseries based on the novel by Bonnie Garmus

- Genre: Period drama
- Created by: Lee Eisenberg
- Based on: Lessons in Chemistry by Bonnie Garmus
- Directed by: Sarah Adina Smith; Bert & Bertie; Millicent Shelton; Tara Miele
- Starring: Brie Larson; Lewis Pullman; Aja Naomi King; Stephanie Koenig; Patrick Walker
- Theme music composer: Carlos Rafael Rivera
- Country of origin: United States
- Original language: English
- No. of episodes: 8

Production
- Executive producers: Jason Bateman; Michael Costigan; Susannah Grant; Brie Larson; Lee Eisenberg; Natalie Sandy; Louise Shore; Rosa Handelman; Hannah Fidell
- Cinematography: Zachary Galler; Jason Oldak
- Editors: Matthew James Barbato; Jack Cunningham; Geraud Brisson; Daniel Martens; Laura Zempel; Lily Wild
- Running time: 41–50 minutes
- Production companies: The Great Unknown Productions; Piece of Work Entertainment; Aggregate Films; Apple Studios

Original release
- Network: Apple TV+
- Release: October 13 – November 22, 2023

Lessons in Chemistry is an American period drama miniseries created by Lee Eisenberg, based on the novel of the same name by Bonnie Garmus. It stars Brie Larson as chemist Elizabeth Zott who begins hosting her own feminist cooking show in 1950s America.

The series began streaming on Apple TV on October 13, 2023, and ended November 22, 2023. It received positive reviews from critics, and received nominations for two Golden Globe Awards, Best Limited or Anthology Series and Best Actress – Miniseries for Larson. In 2024 Sarah Adina Smith won the Directors Guild of America Award for Outstanding Directorial Achievement in Movies for Television and Limited Series for directing the second episode "Her and Him".

== Premise ==
After being fired from her job as a lab tech, chemist Elizabeth Zott uses her new job hosting a 1950s television cooking show titled Supper at Six to educate housewives on scientific topics.

== Cast ==
=== Main ===
- Brie Larson as Elizabeth Zott
- Lewis Pullman as Calvin Evans
- Aja Naomi King as Harriet Sloane
- Stephanie Koenig as Fran Frask
- Patrick Walker as Reverend Curtis Wakely

=== Recurring ===
- Derek Cecil as Dr. Robert Donatti
- Thomas Mann as Boryweitz
- Andy Daly as Dr. Richard Price
- Alice Halsey as Madeline Zott
- Amentii Sledge as Linda Sloane
- Yasir Hashim Lafond as James "Junior" Sloane
- Joshua Hoover as Anthony Powers
- Kevin Sussman as Walter Pine
- Marc Evan Jackson as Dr. Leland Mason
- Paul James as Charlie Sloane
- Rainn Wilson as Phil Lebensmal

=== Guest ===
- Adam Bartley as Scientist
- Tate Ellington as Dr. Bates
- B. J. Novak as Six-Thirty (voice)
- Beau Bridges as Harry Wilson
- Jake Short as Ralph Bailey
- Ashley Monique Clark as Martha Wakely
- Rosemarie DeWitt as Avery Parker
- Shoo Shoo Parsells as Amanda Pine

== Episodes ==
No.	Title	Directed by	Teleplay by	Original release date
1	"Little Miss Hastings"	Sarah Adina Smith	Lee Eisenberg	October 13, 2023
Elizabeth Zott, a lab technician at the Hastings Research Institute, is disallowed by her superiors from developing her own research projects due to her gender and lack of a PhD. Elizabeth also applies her passion for chemistry to her cooking. After being forced to enter a workplace beauty pageant, she befriends Dr. Calvin Evans, the institute's star researcher. He agrees to transfer her to his laboratory so she can conduct her abiogenesis research independently. However, she abruptly leaves the lab when he inadvertently reminds her of a past assault. Seven years later, Elizabeth has become the famous host of a chemistry-based cooking show, Supper at Six.
2	"Her and Him"	Sarah Adina Smith	Elissa Karasik	October 13, 2023
Flashbacks reveal that Elizabeth's thesis adviser had attempted to rape her during her doctoral candidacy exams, however she fought him off by stabbing him with a pencil. She is then told by the university that she can either admit fault for stabbing her advisor or rescind her candidacy, which she does. In the present, Elizabeth adopts a dog and names him Six Thirty. Their supervisor, Dr. Donatti, threatens Elizabeth with layoffs if Calvin's research does not qualify for a prestigious grant. Calvin's neighbor, Harriet, invites him to a meeting to try and stop the Santa Monica Freeway from being built through Sugar Hill. However, Calvin is distracted by his reconciliation, research progress, and developing romance with Elizabeth, who agrees to move in with him. Though the Hastings higher-ups (who believe amino acids, not DNA, are the foundations of life) reject their grant proposal, Calvin and Elizabeth decide to submit on their own. Calvin goes on one of his daily runs with Six Thirty and is suddenly hit by a bus.
3	"Living Dead Things"	Bert & Bertie	Lee Eisenberg & Emily Fox	October 20, 2023
Six Thirty's narration reveals his past as a former military dog and his guilt at Calvin's death. At the funeral, a grief-stricken Elizabeth is questioned by a journalist for the LA Times. Elizabeth returns to Hastings to find their lab emptied and their research in storage; Donatti attempts to recreate Calvin and Elizabeth's experiments and claim the research as his. To the dog's delight, Elizabeth realizes she is pregnant. Intending to continue her research, she begins to build a laboratory in her kitchen. Elizabeth also befriends Harriet over their shared grief at Calvin's death. Harriet fails to change the posthumous smear piece on Calvin, but the Times runs a story about her activism against the freeway. Donatti attempts to fire Elizabeth for being unwed and pregnant.
4	"Primitive Instinct"	Bert & Bertie	Elissa Karasik	October 27, 2023
Elizabeth gives birth to a daughter, whom she names Mad. Still struggling with the loss of Calvin, she eventually finds emotional support in Harriet. For income, Elizabeth secretly serves as a consultant for fellow chemists facing research difficulties. She learns of Boryweitz and Donatti's theft of her and Calvin's research. She procures equipment for her kitchen-laboratory by impersonating Fran. Harriet's husband Charlie returns from the Korean War. She expresses her desire to continue her law career. Elizabeth is invited to row with Dr. Mason's group. Seven years later, Elizabeth learns that Amanda, an ostracized student, has been eating Madeline's lunches. The girls have been tasked with creating a family tree. Elizabeth confronts Amanda's father, Walter, a television producer who offers Elizabeth a show of her own.
5	"CH_{3}COOH"	Millicent Shelton	Lee Eisenberg & Emily Fox	November 3, 2023
Mad begins work on her family tree, while Elizabeth works towards a job offer at another laboratory. Mad's teacher advises Elizabeth to move Mad to an advanced private school, and the cost leads Elizabeth to accept Walter's offer. Elizabeth and Walter butt heads with the sexist station owner, Phil, as she tries to make the show her own; ultimately, Supper at Six is a hit with the female audience. Mad, upset with the new status quo, starts looking into Calvin's past with the assistance of Reverend Wakely.
6	"Poirot"	Millicent Shelton	Elissa Karasik	November 10, 2023
Flashbacks reveal that Elizabeth's father was a preacher who faked miracles; his abuse and homophobia eventually drove her gay brother John to suicide. Mad continues looking for information on Calvin. Elizabeth invites Fran to a taping and hires her as chief of staff. Inspired by the burgeoning civil rights movement, Harriet organizes a protest over freeway construction in the West Adams neighborhood. Elizabeth initially caves to Phil's attempts at product placement after he leverages the pay of her crew, but after a talk with Harriet, Elizabeth invites her audience to the protest and pays the crew over the course of the suspension out of her own pocket. At the protest, the police brutalize protesters and arrest Harriet. Elizabeth finally discusses John and Calvin with Mad.
7	"Book of Calvin"	Tara Miele	Elissa Karasik	November 17, 2023
In flashbacks, a young Calvin honed his chemistry skills, producing prayer candles and moonshine for the St. Luke's boys' home, and the bishop prevented his adoption. Calvin was consistently uncomfortable with people claiming to be related to him after he became famous. He also became pen pals with Wakely after the latter attended a guest lecture and discussed science, religion, and eventually his relationship with Elizabeth with him. When Mad and Elizabeth visit St. Luke's, the bishop feigns ignorance of Calvin, but they find a library card with his name on it. The book was donated by the Remsen Foundation.
8	"Introduction to Chemistry"	Tara Miele	Lee Eisenberg	November 22, 2023
Elizabeth is tasked with finding a replacement sponsor for Supper at Six. She meets with Avery Parker, Calvin's biological mother, who explains that she was forced to give Calvin away at birth. She had tried to adopt him and resorted to supporting him through the Remsen Foundation. Mad tells Elizabeth to continue doing science. Elizabeth selects Tampax as a sponsor, discussing menstruation on air, and quits the show on live TV. To Harriet's despair, the motion to build the freeway passes. Three years later, Elizabeth teaches an Introduction to Chemistry class as she pursues her PhD.

== Production ==
It was announced in January 2021 that Apple TV+ had issued a straight-to-series order for the show, with Brie Larson set to star and executive produce. The series began production by August 2022, with Lewis Pullman, Aja Naomi King, Stephanie Koenig, Patrick Walker, Thomas Mann, Kevin Sussman and Beau Bridges added to the cast. Filming took place primarily in and around Los Angeles, lasting from August 2022 through December 2022.

== Reception ==
The review aggregator website Rotten Tomatoes reported an 86% approval rating with an average rating of 7.4/10, based on 69 critic reviews. The website's critics consensus reads, "Touching on several hot button issues while benefiting immensely from a perfect pinch of Brie Larson, Lessons in Chemistry's ambitious ingredients add up to satisfying entertainment." Metacritic, which uses a weighted average, assigned a score of 68 out of 100 based on 30 critics, indicating "generally favorable" reviews.

== Accolades ==
Year	Award	Category	Recipient	Result	Ref.
2023	Women Film Critics Circle Awards	Best TV Series	Lessons in Chemistry	Won	
2024	American Cinema Editors	Best Edited Limited Series	Géraud Brisson and Daniel Martens (for "Introduction to Chemistry")	Nominated	
2024	American Society of Cinematographers Awards	Outstanding Achievement in Cinematography in Motion Picture, Miniseries, or Pilot Made for Television	Jason Oldak (for "Book of Calvin")	Nominated	
2024	Art Directors Guild Awards	Excellence in Production Design for a Television Movie or Limited Series	Cat Smith	Nominated	
2024	Astra TV Awards	Best Limited Series	Lessons in Chemistry	Nominated	
2024	Astra TV Awards	Best Actress in a Limited Series or TV Movie	Brie Larson	Won	
2024	Astra TV Awards	Best Supporting Actor in a Limited Series or TV Movie	Lewis Pullman	Nominated	
2024	Astra TV Awards	Best Supporting Actress in a Limited Series or TV Movie	Aja Naomi King	Nominated	
2024	Astra TV Awards	Best Directing in a Limited Series or TV Movie	Sarah Adina Smith (for "Her and Him")	Nominated	
2024	Astra TV Awards	Best Writing in a Limited Series or TV Movie	Lee Eisenberg (for "Little Miss Hastings")	Nominated	
2024	Black Reel Awards	Outstanding Supporting Performance in a TV Movie/Limited Series	Aja Naomi King	Nominated	
2024	Black Reel Awards	Outstanding Directing in a TV Movie or Limited Series	Millicent Shelton (for "CH3COOH")	Nominated	
2024	Critics Choice Awards	Best Limited Series	Lessons in Chemistry	Nominated	
2024	Critics Choice Awards	Best Actress in a Limited Series or Movie Made for Television	Brie Larson	Nominated	
2024	Critics Choice Awards	Best Supporting Actor in a Limited Series or Movie Made for Television	Lewis Pullman	Nominated	
2024	Critics Choice Awards	Best Supporting Actress in a Limited Series or Movie Made for Television	Aja Naomi King	Nominated	
2024	Directors Guild of America Awards	Outstanding Directing – Miniseries or Movies for Television	Tara Miele (for "Introduction to Chemistry")	Nominated	
2024	Directors Guild of America Awards	Outstanding Directing – Miniseries or Movies for Television	Millicent Shelton (for "Poirot")	Nominated	
2024	Directors Guild of America Awards	Outstanding Directing – Miniseries or Movies for Television	Sarah Adina Smith (for "Her and Him")	Won	
2024	Golden Globe Awards	Best Television Limited Series, Anthology Series, or Motion Picture Made for Television	Lessons in Chemistry	Nominated	
2024	Golden Globe Awards	Best Performance by a Female Actor in a Limited Series, Anthology Series, or a Motion Picture Made for Television	Brie Larson	Nominated	
2024	Independent Spirit Awards	Best Supporting Performance in a New Scripted Series	Lewis Pullman	Nominated	
2024	Make-Up Artists and Hair Stylists Guild Awards	Best Period and/or Character Make-Up	Miho Suzuki Herpich and Martina Kohl	Nominated	
2024	Make-Up Artists and Hair Stylists Guild Awards	Best Period and/or Character Hair Styling	Teressa Hill, Carol Mitchell, Juan Nunez, and Sharisse Fine	Nominated	
2024	NAACP Image Awards	Outstanding Supporting Actress in a Television Movie, Limited-Series or Dramatic Special	Aja Naomi King	Nominated	
2024	Primetime Emmy Awards	Outstanding Limited or Anthology Series	Hannah Fidell, Rosa Handelman, Susannah Grant, Natalie Sandy, Louise Shore, Jason Bateman, Michael Costigan, Brie Larson, Lee Eisenberg, Elijah Allan-Blitz, Mfoniso Udofia, Boo Killebrew, Elissa Karasik, Bonnie Garmus, Tracey Nyberg, Teagan Wall, and Nicole Delaney	Nominated	
2024	Primetime Emmy Awards	Outstanding Lead Actress in a Limited or Anthology Series or Movie	Brie Larson	Nominated	
2024	Primetime Emmy Awards	Outstanding Supporting Actor in a Limited or Anthology Series or Movie	Lewis Pullman (for "Her and Him")	Nominated	
2024	Primetime Emmy Awards	Outstanding Supporting Actress in a Limited or Anthology Series or Movie	Aja Naomi King (for "Poirot")	Nominated	
2024	Primetime Emmy Awards	Outstanding Directing for a Limited or Anthology Series or Movie	Millicent Shelton (for "Poirot")	Nominated	
2024	Primetime Creative Arts Emmy Awards	Outstanding Cinematography for a Limited or Anthology Series or Movie	Zachary Galler (for "Little Miss Hastings")	Nominated	
2024	Primetime Creative Arts Emmy Awards	Outstanding Period Costumes	Mirren Gordon-Crozier, Jen Kennedy, and Kelli Hagen (for "Little Miss Hastings")	Nominated	
2024	Primetime Creative Arts Emmy Awards	Outstanding Main Title Design	Hazel Baird, Rob Cawdery, Ben Jones, and Phil Davies	Nominated	
2024	Primetime Creative Arts Emmy Awards	Outstanding Music Composition for a Limited or Anthology Series, Movie or Special (Original Dramatic Score)	Carlos Rafael Rivera (for "Book of Calvin")	Won	
2024	Primetime Creative Arts Emmy Awards	Outstanding Original Main Title Theme Music	Carlos Rafael Rivera	Nominated	
2024	Producers Guild of America Awards	Best Limited Series Television	Lessons in Chemistry	Nominated	
2024	Satellite Awards	Best Actress in a Miniseries, Limited Series, or Motion Picture Made for Television	Brie Larson	Nominated	
2024	Screen Actors Guild Awards	Outstanding Performance by a Female Actor in a Miniseries or Television Movie	Brie Larson	Nominated	
2024	Society of Composers & Lyricists Awards	Outstanding Original Score for a Television Production	Carlos Rafael Rivera	Nominated	
2024	Society of Composers & Lyricists Awards	Outstanding Original Title Sequence for a Television Production	Carlos Rafael Rivera	Won	
2024	Writers Guild of America Awards	Limited Series	Victoria Bata, Lee Eisenberg, Hannah Fidell, Emily Jane Fox, Susannah Grant, Rosa Handelman, Elissa Karasik, Boo Killebrew, and Mfoniso Udofia	Nominated	
