= Lessons in Chemistry (novel) =

2022 novel by Bonnie Garmus

- Author: Bonnie Garmus
- Audio read by: Miranda Raison
- Genre: Tragicomedy
- Set in: 1960s Southern California
- Publisher: Doubleday
- Publication date: April 5, 2022
- Pages: 560
- ISBN: 9780385547345

Lessons in Chemistry is a novel by Bonnie Garmus. Published by Doubleday in April 2022, it is Garmus's debut novel. It tells the story of Elizabeth Zott, who becomes a beloved cooking show host in 1960s Southern California after being fired as a chemist four years earlier. It was adapted into an Apple TV+ miniseries that debuted on October 13, 2023.

== Inception ==
Garmus told People magazine that she wrote Lessons in Chemistry after her previous novel was rejected by 98 publishers because it was "too long". The book was originally called "Introduction to Chemistry", but was later renamed by the author's agent, Felicity Blunt. It was published a few days before the author turned 65 in 2022.

The book was inspired by Garmus's experience as a creative director in an advertising agency, in particular after a frustrating meeting where a male co-worker took credit for one of her ideas. While writing Lessons in Chemistry, Garmus was a full-time copywriter but taught herself some school-level chemistry, attempting experiments from The Golden Book of Chemistry Experiments. She said in an interview with the Los Angeles Times: "The fire department had to come twice for the amount of flames in my flat". She also adapted her own interest in rowing as a hobby of the protagonist, Zott. Aside from rowing, Garmus said that she does not share other commonalities with Zott, but has instead written her "role model".

== Synopsis ==
After being sexually assaulted and refusing to apologize for stabbing her rapist, Elizabeth Zott is expelled from her doctoral program. She then gets a job at Hastings Research Institute, working as a Lab Technician in a chemistry laboratory. She meets fellow Hastings researcher Calvin Evans while taking surplus beakers from his lab. Evans assumes that she is a secretary and ignores her. They later encounter each other at a theater, and Evans, experiencing an allergic reaction to another woman's perfume, vomits on Zott. They start dating and living together shortly after.

Evans proposes in the staff dining room, but Zott rejects him, citing concerns that as her husband Evans would be given credit for all of her work. A month later, Zott adopts an abandoned explosive detection dog and names him Six-Thirty as that is the time he initially follows her home. Evans convinces Zott to take up rowing, and Zott starts training her dog.

Due to a local law, Zott buys a leash for Six-Thirty. The leash indirectly causes Evans's skull to be fractured in a fatal accident. Zott later finds herself pregnant with his child, which leads to her being fired from Hastings. She decides to continue her research by converting her kitchen into a lab, obtaining income by providing research advice to former colleagues in return for compensation. During this, Six-Thirty starts communicating and teaching her unborn child words. Zott seeks support for her pregnancy with Dr. Mason, who used to row with her. Months later, she gives birth to Madeline. Afterwards, Harriet Sloane, her neighbor, comes to offer support.

Three years later, Zott decides to enroll Madeline in kindergarten early, modifying her birth certificate to do so. Because of financial difficulties, Zott attempts to return to Hastings. The head of the chemistry department, Dr. Donatti, approves her hiring but refuses to give her anything more than menial labor as a lab technician. During an argument with her coworker, Miss Frask, Zott discovers that Frask had been sexually assaulted by a thesis advisor, an experience they share which stopped them both from obtaining their PhDs. Frask is subsequently fired for gaining weight. Before leaving, Frask gives Zott a set of research files that had once belonged to Evans.

Two months after returning to Hastings, Donatti plagiarizes Zott's work. She confronts him and resigns. At home, Zott discovers that a classmate is eating Madeline's lunch. She goes to talk to the other girl's father, Walter Pine. Pine, a local television producer, offers her a job as a cooking show host due to her unique personality. During the debut, Zott ignores the cue cards Pine had written for her, which is met with disapproval.

Having been assigned a school project to make a family tree, Madeline searches for Evans's orphanage. She meets Reverend Wakely during the project who recalls that he was pen pals with Evans during college and promises to call the orphanage for her and to look for its mysterious donor. At work, Zott is called in to the executive producer, Phil Lebensmal's office. Lebensmal fires her citing her rebellious attitude, then attempts to sexually assault her. She draws a kitchen knife and Lebensmal has a heart attack. Zott calls an ambulance and, while waiting, discovers syndication and sponsorship offers not revealed to Pine. Lebensmal does not return to work, making Pine the executive producer.

After turning down multiple magazine interview offers, Zott accepts Franklin Roth's interview for Life. Roth writes a positive article, which is rejected multiple times. His editor publishes a modified one with a negative tone and excessive personal details. Prior to publication, Roth leaves an envelope with the unpublished original at Zott's doorstep. Madeline takes it and gives it to Frask, who is working as Wakely's secretary, and Frask reads it. Wakely comes to Zott's residence to speak to Madeline after the article's publication and gives Zott Roth's original article. Frask and others write to the editors of the magazine in protest and Harriet submits the original article to several other magazines, leading to its publication weeks later in Vogue.

Zott, saddened by the article, resigns as the host of the show, stating that she will be pursuing a career in research. Frask's letter to Life is noticed by an early investor in Zott's research, who decides to acquire Hastings and replace Donatti with Zott. The investor reveals that she is Evans's mother and found them due to Madeline's having sent a letter to her foundation thanking her for funding the orphanage. They reminisce about the past and her investment allows Zott to continue her abiogenesis research.

== Critical reception ==
Lessons in Chemistry was named the Barnes & Noble Book of the Year in 2022. In 2023, it was the most borrowed book from several public libraries. It was also one of the most borrowed titles for 2024.

It won the German Independent Booksellers Favorite book of the Year (Das Lieblingsbuch der Unabhängigen Buchhandlungen 2022), the Hay Festival Book of the Year 2022, Dymocks Book of the Year 2022 (Australia), Goodreads Choice Awards – Best Debut 2022, and many other honors. It was number 5 on ABC Radio's Best 100 Books of the 21st Century list, and was chosen by readers of The New York Times as one of the best 100 books of the 21st century. It was also chosen as one of the best books of the decade on Goodreads.

Stephanie Merritt of The Guardian praised the author's ability in creating a "richly comic novel around a character who is entirely deadpan" and called the book "a polished, funny, thought-provoking story, wearing its research lightly but confidently, and with sentences so stylishly turned it’s hard to believe it’s a debut" but holding a few flaws common in debut novels, including an unfocused narrative perspective. Karen Heller writing for The Washington Post called the book an "indelible assemblage of stubborn, idiosyncratic characters" and that there was an "infectious absurdity" to the book and its protagonist. In an article for The New York Times, Elisabeth Egan called the book "irresistible, satisfying and full of fuel" and added that "feminism is the catalyst" of the book. Michael Byers from Cascadia Daily News wrote that the "heroine is brave, original and completely unafraid" and that the reasons for the book's success are clear. Francesca Peacock in Literary Review called the book "witty, fast-paced, and unabashedly amusing." Kirkus Reviews said that "a more adorable plea for rationalism and gender equality would be hard to find."

== Screen adaptation ==
The rights for the screen adaptation were sold by auction. AppleTV+ held the screen adaptation rights to the novel. The book was eventually adapted by Lee Eisenberg for the streaming service into a miniseries that debuted on October 13, 2023. Garmus said in an interview that she gave minimal input to the script writing and production of the TV adaptation.
