= Charles Wheeler (journalist) =

British journalist and broadcaster

Sir Charles Wheeler CMG
- Born: Selwyn Charles Cornelius-Wheeler; 26 March 1923; Bremen, Germany
- Died: 4 July 2008 (aged 85); Warnham, Sussex, England
- Education: Cranbrook School, Kent
- Occupation: BBC News foreign correspondent
- Notable credit(s): Newsnight, Dateline London, Panorama
- Spouse(s): Catherine Dove (m. 1958; div. 1962) Dip Singh (m. 1962)
- Children: 2; including Marina
- Relatives: Lara Johnson-Wheeler (granddaughter)

Sir Selwyn Charles Cornelius-Wheeler (26 March 1923 – 4 July 2008) was a British journalist and broadcaster. Having joined the BBC in 1947, he became the corporation's longest-serving foreign correspondent, remaining in the role until his death. Wheeler also had spells as presenter of several BBC current affairs television programmes, including Newsnight and Panorama.

== Early life ==
Wheeler was born in Bremen, Germany, in 1923, to Winifred Agnes (née Rees) and Charles Cornelius-Wheeler. The family later moved to Hamburg, where his father was an agent for a shipping company. Educated at the Cranbrook School in Kent, his first job was as an errand boy at the Daily Sketch newspaper at the age of 17. He enlisted in the Royal Marines in 1942, rising to the rank of captain. For a time he was stationed onboard the battleship HMS Ramillies.

As part of 30 Assault Unit, a secret naval intelligence unit assembled by Ian Fleming, he participated in the Allies’ advance through Western Europe following the Normandy landings as second-in-command to Patrick Dalzel-Job.

== Career ==
After leaving the Royal Marines in 1947, Wheeler joined the BBC, initially as a sub-editor at the Latin American division of the World Service. Wheeler's long career as a foreign correspondent began with a three-year posting to Berlin in 1950, partly thanks to his fluency in German. He returned to the UK and became a producer on the fledgling current affairs series Panorama in 1956. As part of Panorama's team, he travelled to Hungary to cover what would become known as the Hungarian Uprising. Taking Panorama's camera into the country, despite being told not to, he filmed the jubilant Hungarian reaction to the rebellion. He and the Panorama producer (and his then-wife) Catherine Freeman had to persuade the BBC to give the story prominence. Just hours after Wheeler returned to Britain, Russia re-entered Hungary and crushed the revolt.

Having declined an offer to become the programme's editor, he was later assigned to New Delhi (where he reported extensively on the 1959 Tibetan uprising). He returned to Berlin when the Wall was built and remained there for several years with his Indian-born second wife. Between 1965 and 1973, he moved to Washington DC, where he covered the American Civil Rights Movement and the Watergate scandal. In the later years of his television career, he was the American correspondent of Newsnight. Wheeler was the first presenter of BBC World's Dateline London discussion programme. He remained active in his later years as a presenter of documentary series on Radio 4 and a contributor to the network From Our Own Correspondent. He had been working on a programme about the Dalai Lama until a few weeks before his death.

== Charles Wheeler Award ==
Charles Wheeler Award
- Awarded for: Outstanding Contribution to Broadcast Journalism
- Country: United Kingdom
- First award: 2009; 17 years ago
- Currently held by: Steve Rosenberg (2025)

Following Wheeler's death, the British Journalism Review established the Charles Wheeler Award for Outstanding Contribution to Broadcast Journalism, which is presented annually at an event co-hosted by the publication and the University of Westminster and followed by a keynote lecture.

The award ceremony was traditionally held in June but due to the COVID-19 pandemic, the 2020 ceremony was held online in November of that year. The award was not bestowed the following year, but subsequent ceremonies have retained an autumn date and taken place at the Regent Street Cinema. The award is presented each year by members of the Wheeler family.

=== Winners ===
Year	Winner	Charles Wheeler Lecture	Ref
2009	Jeremy Paxman	Mark Thompson	
2010	Jeremy Bowen	Boris Johnson	
2011	Lindsey Hilsum	Alastair Campbell	
2012	Allan Little	Alan Rusbridger	
2013	Robin Lustig	Harriet Harman	
2014	Jon Snow	Robert Peston	
2015	Alex Crawford	Alan Yentob	
2016	George Alagiah	Tom Stoppard	
2017	Lyse Doucet	Kate Adie	
2018	Michael Crick	Gina Miller	
2019	Katya Adler	Jim Naughtie	
2020	Hugh Pym	Peter Bazalgette	
2021	Not awarded due to COVID-19 pandemic		
2022	Matt Frei	Catherine Mayer	
2023	Christiane Amanpour	-	
2024	Mishal Hussain	Lindsey Hilsum	
2025	Steve Rosenberg	Susie Dent	

== Personal life ==
Wheeler was twice married: his first marriage was to the BBC producer Catherine Freeman and his second marriage, in 1962, was to Dip Singh with whom he had two daughters: barrister Marina Wheeler (the former wife of British prime minister Boris Johnson) and Shirin Wheeler, the BBC's former Brussels correspondent. Wheeler was appointed a Companion of the Order of St Michael and St George in 2001, and was knighted in the 2006 Birthday Honours, for services to broadcasting and journalism overseas.

In June 2006, Wheeler announced he had discovered that a painting by Alessandro Allori of Eleonora of Toledo, the wife of Cosimo de' Medici, which had been given to him in Berlin as a wedding present in 1952, had been looted during the Second World War. Via the Commission for Looted Art in Europe it was returned to its legitimate owner, the Gemäldegalerie of Berlin, from whose possession it had been absent since 1944.

Wheeler died of lung cancer at his home in Warnham, Sussex on 4 July 2008. He was 85 years old.
