= Oregon Remembrance Project =

U.S. racial equality nonprofit

- Formation: 2018; 8 years ago
- Founder: Taylor Stewart
- Type: Non-profit
- Tax ID no.: 87-1812611
- Purpose: Racial equality
- Headquarters: Oregon, U.S.
- Region served: Oregon
- Website: oregonremembrance.org

The Oregon Remembrance Project is a nonprofit initiative that partners with cities in Oregon to address histories of racial exclusion associated with former sundown towns. The organization's mission is to "help communities in Oregon with truth and reconciliation projects in attempts to rectify historical injustices".

Through its Sunrise Project, it works with communities to examine the impacts of past discriminatory practices and undertake educational initiatives, whereby participating municipalities, such as Ashland, Grants Pass, and Oregon City seek to reframe their identities as "sunrise" cities.

== History ==
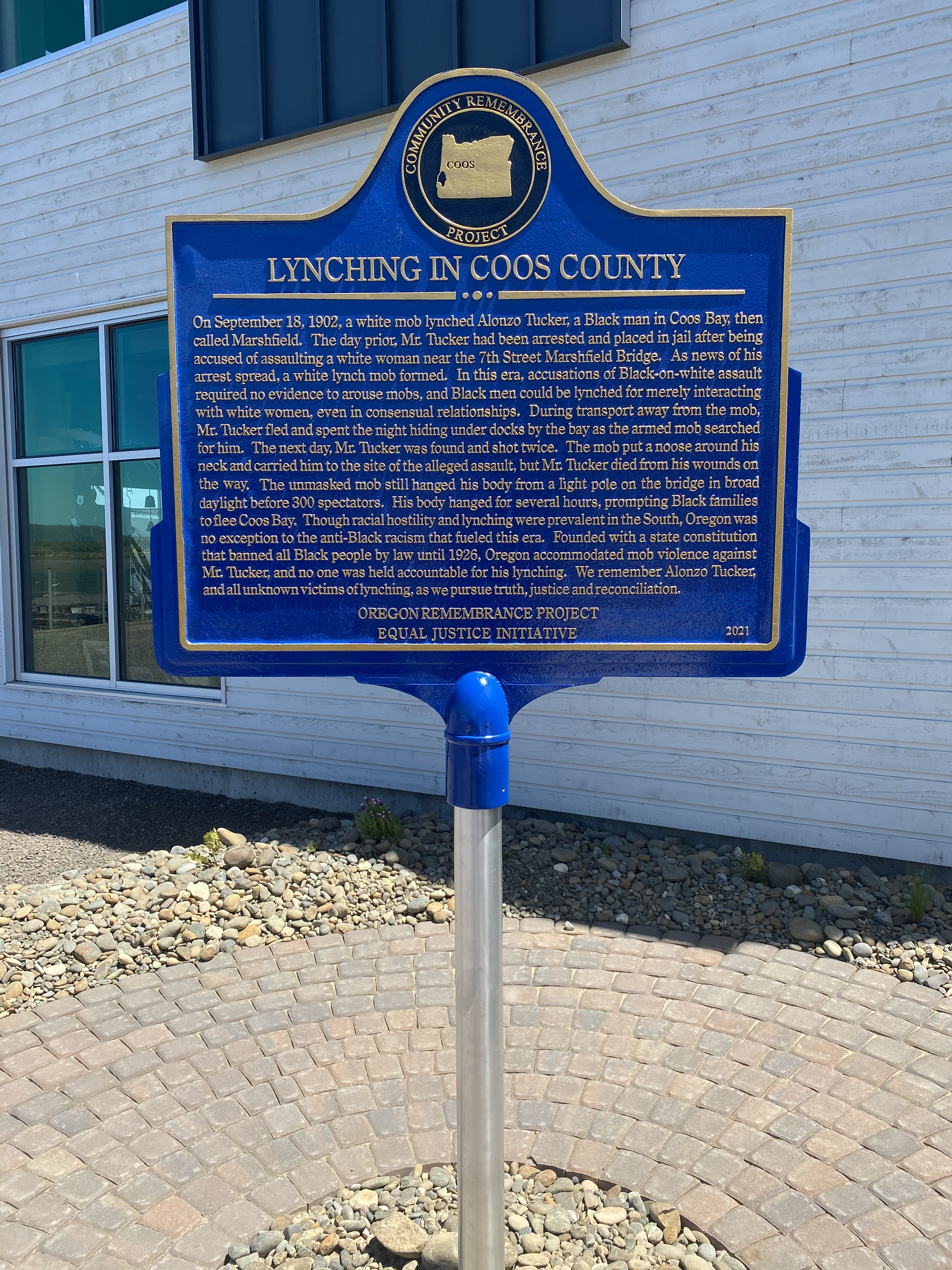
Alonzo Tucker historical marker, placed in Coos Bay, Oregon, on June 23, 2021

The Oregon Remembrance Project was founded in 2018 by Taylor Stewart, who was inspired by the work of Bryan Stevenson and the Equal Justice Initiative. The initiative began to memorialize Alonzo Tucker, the only recorded victim of a lynching in the state of Oregon. In 2020, the Oregon Remembrance Project, Equal Justice Initiative, and the Coos History Museum held an event to honor Alonzo Tucker. The Coos History Museum partnered with the Oregon Remembrance Project to collect jars of soil from significant sites connected to the lynching of Alonzo Tucker. The jars were displayed as part of a broader museum exhibit on Oregon's racial history, which also examined Black exclusion laws and the forced removal of Native tribes from the region. A historical marker was placed in June 2021, commemorating Tucker.

In addition to the initiative's work concerning Alonzo Tucker, the Oregon Remembrance Project is working with the Confederated Tribes of the Grand Ronde Community of Oregon to memorialize Jacob Vanderpool in Oregon City, the only known person expelled from Oregon under the state's black exclusionary laws. The Oregon Remembrance Project also oversaw the creation of a memorial for Timothy Pettis, a victim of murder in 1924.

In June 2023, the Oregon Remembrance Project participated in the Grant Pass annual Memorial Day weekend Boatnik Parade, wearing bright yellow t-shirts to contrast the white robes worn by the Ku Klux Klan, which used to march in the parade.

The Oregon Remembrance Project was the subject of a 2024 documentary produced by Oregon Public Broadcasting titled Road to sunrise: A journey to reconcile Oregon’s racist history. The documentary won a NATAS Northwest Emmy under the category of "Historical/Cultural - Long Form Content".

In April 2025, the Rogue Valley Times reported that the Oregon Remembrance Project supported the "Justice for Hakiym" campaign alongside the NAACP and Black Alliance & Social Empowerment (BASE). The campaign supports Brian “Hakiym” Simpson, an imprisoned wildland firefighter arrested in an "act of self-defense in a racially motivated attack by a fellow wildland firefighter".

=== Sunrise Project ===
The Oregon Remembrance Project's Sunrise Project is a program that works with Oregon municipalities (such as Ashland, Grants Pass, and Oregon City) to research, document, and publicly acknowledge histories of racial exclusion, particularly their past as sundown towns. The program includes historical research, public education, and community engagement, encouraging participating communities to examine the historical and contemporary effects of exclusionary practices.

In 2026, the Oregon Remembrance Project launched Sunshine Trips as part of its Sunrise Project initiative. The free, guided trips bring Black Oregonians to former Oregon-based sundown towns to learn about local Black history, meet community leaders, and participate in cultural and educational programs intended to support community reconciliation. The inaugural trip, held in Ashland in May 2026, included visits to local memorial projects, a Say Their Names vigil, a performance of A Raisin in the Sun at the Oregon Shakespeare Festival, and a guided tour of sites significant to local Black history.
