= Equal Justice Initiative =

U.S. non-profit organization

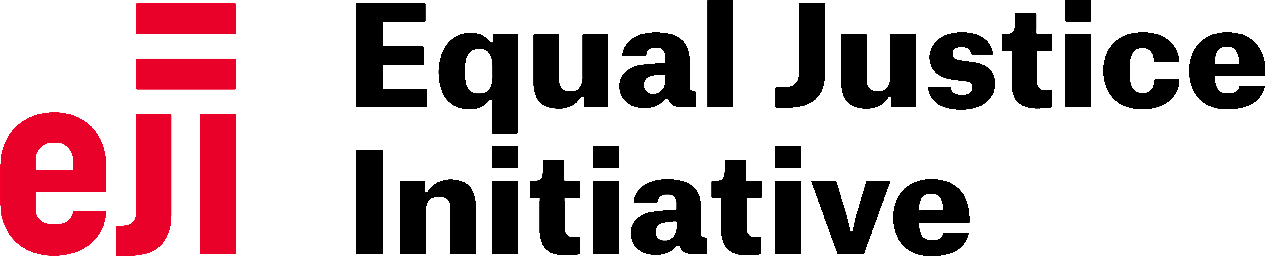
- Formation: 1989; 37 years ago
- Founders: Bryan Stevenson; Eva Ansley
- Type: Non-profit
- Purpose: Providing legal representation to those who may have been denied a fair trial
- Location: Montgomery, Alabama
- Coordinates: 32.37957°N 86.312983°W
- Executive director: Bryan Stevenson
- Website: eji.org

The Equal Justice Initiative (EJI) is a non-profit organization, based in Montgomery, Alabama, that provides legal representation to prisoners who may have been wrongly convicted of crimes, poor prisoners without effective representation, and others who may have been denied a fair trial. It guarantees the defense of anyone in Alabama in a death penalty case.

Founder Bryan Stevenson was depicted in the legal drama Just Mercy, which is based on his memoir Just Mercy: A Story of Justice and Redemption. The film tells the story of Walter McMillian and, in less detail, the stories of other Stevenson cases.

The Equal Justice Initiative won the 2020 Webby People's Voice Award for Charitable Organization/Nonprofit in the category Web.

== History ==
The Equal Justice Initiative (EJI) was founded in 1989 in Montgomery, Alabama, by attorney Bryan Stevenson, who has served as the organization's executive director ever since, and Eva Ansley, who is the EJI’s operations director as of 2020. Stevenson has been working on Alabama defense cases since 1989 for the Southern Center for Human Rights and was director of its center for Alabama operations. As of 2022, Alabama is the only state that does not provide state-funded legal assistance to death row prisoners; EJI has committed to representing them.

Stevenson converted his operation in Montgomery by founding a non-profit, the Equal Justice Initiative. In 1995 he was awarded a MacArthur fellowship, and he applied all of the money to support the EJI. The EJI "guarantees legal representation to every inmate on the state's death row." It has worked to eliminate excessive and unfair sentencing, exonerate innocent death row prisoners, confront abuse of the incarcerated and the mentally ill, and aid children prosecuted as adults.

By 2013 EJI had a staff of 40, including attorneys and support personnel.

On April 26, 2018, the EJI opened two new venues in Montgomery in memory of the victims of lynchings in the Southern United States: the National Memorial for Peace and Justice, and The Legacy Museum. In 2020, the EJI, Oregon Remembrance Project, and the Coos History Museum held an event to honor Alonzo Tucker, an Oregon-based victim of lynching that occurred in 1902.

=== Campaign against life-without-parole sentencing for juveniles ===
Following the Roper v. Simmons (2005) ruling, in which the United States Supreme Court ruled that it was unconstitutional to sentence to death a person who had been a minor under 18 at the time of the crime, Stevenson began to work to have similar thinking applied to the sentencing of a convicted minor to life-without-parole in prison. He has argued several cases in the Supreme Court, and has been part of a movement to urge changes in extreme sentencing of juveniles convicted of crimes.

The Court has made several significant rulings to lighten sentencing of juveniles since Roper v. Simmons. In 2006 EJI started a litigation campaign to challenge the sentencing of minors to life-without-parole. Stevenson testified before the court in 2009 in one case. In Graham v. Florida (2010), the Court ruled that "mandatory life-without-parole sentences for all children 17 or younger in non-homicide cases are unconstitutional." Since 2010, EJI has provided legal representation to nearly 100 people in the United States who are entitled to new sentences under Graham.

At that time, there were nearly "3000 children age 17 or younger who had been sentenced to imprisonment until death through life-without-parole sentences imposed with very little scrutiny or review. Children as young as 13 were among the thousands condemned to die in prison."

Most of the sentences imposed on these juveniles were mandatory, but EJI continued to argue along the lines of the Court's ruling in Roper v. Simmons, that juveniles have "unique immaturity, impulsiveness, vulnerability, and capacity for redemption and rehabilitation."

EJI argued in US Supreme Court cases Miller v. Alabama and Jackson v. Hobbs that the mandatory sentences constituted "cruel and unusual punishment" and were therefore unconstitutional. The Court ruled in these cases in June 2012 that even when cases involved homicide, mandatory life-without-parole sentences for minors 17 or younger are unconstitutional. The ruling affected statutes in 29 states.

In Montgomery v. Louisiana (2016), the Court ruled that the decision in Miller v. Alabama had to be applied retroactively, and required those sentencing to consider "children's diminished culpability, and heightened capacity for change." An estimated 2300 prisoners nationwide may be affected whose sentences will be reviewed.

=== Campaign against the death penalty ===
In April 2015, EJI won the release on different grounds of Anthony Ray Hinton, a black man who had been on death row in Alabama for nearly 30 years; he had continued to maintain his innocence. He was released after being wrongfully convicted of murder due to inadequate counsel and faulty evidence. He had finally gained a new trial on appeal, as the defense found flaws in the main evidence used by the prosecution. In preparation for trial, the prosecution found that the bullets used in the crime did not match the gun they had traced to Hinton's home. There was no case, and the state dropped the charges.

As of 2019, the EJI organization has prevented more than 125 people from receiving the death penalty.

=== Studies ===
The EJI has published a number of studies, including Lynching in America: Confronting the Legacy of Racial Terror, which was first published in 2015 and is in its 3rd edition. It concludes that a total of 3,959 lynchings of African Americans had occurred in the twelve states of the South from 1877 to 1950. The victims were mostly African-American men, although women and children were also killed. The report classified the lynchings as racial terrorism, designed to suppress the African-American community, especially as the southern legislatures were passing new laws and constitutions to disenfranchise most blacks at the turn of the century. Whites maintained this political exclusion, in part through regular intimidation and violence, through the mid-1960s.

The report discusses the long-term effects of the decades of violence on the African-American community and southern society, and on relations between the races. According to the EJI, the history of lynching and white supremacy underlies the South's history of extensive use of the death penalty and incarceration of African Americans. Stevenson and EJI staff believe this past must be acknowledged and commemorated "with memorials and monuments that encourage and create space for the 'restorative power of truthtelling'", as has been done by other countries and communities.

This new research added nearly 700 cases to previous documentation of lynchings of African Americans in this period. EJI has since published two updated editions of its summary data, which increased the total number of black racial terror victims identified to 4,084 in the Southern states, and 300 in other states in this same time period.

== Legacy sites ==
=== Legacy Museum ===
The Legacy Museum, in Montgomery, Alabama, and the nearby National Memorial for Peace and Justice, opened on April 26, 2018. The topic of the museum is the post-slavery treatment of African Americans by whites. Rather than ending, according to Equal Justice Initiative's head Bryan Stevenson, slavery "evolved": sharecropping, Jim Crow laws, mass incarceration, convict leasing, and lynching. The museum reflects "Stevenson's view that, unlike in [post-Apartheid] South Africa or post-Nazi Germany or many other societies traumatized by history, we've hardly begun to grapple with ours—and so cannot yet get beyond it."

=== National Memorial for Peace and Justice ===
Opened on April 26, 2018, also in Montgomery, the Memorial is intended to call attention to "an aspect of the nation's racial history that's discussed the least", according to Equal Justice Initiative Bryan Stevenson: the 4,400 victims of "terror lynchings" black people from 1877 through 1950. "The memorial's design evokes the image of a racist hanging, featuring scores of dark metal columns suspended in the air from above. The rectangular structures, some of which lie flat on the ground and resemble graves, include the names of counties where lynchings occurred, plus dates and the names of the victims. The goal is for individual counties to claim the columns on the ground and erect their own memorials."

=== Freedom Monument Sculpture Park ===
Starting in 2021, EJI acquired 17 acres in Montgomery on the Alabama River to erect the National Monument to Freedom, a 43-foot (13 m) tall, 155-foot (47 m) long wall depicting 122,000 surnames adopted by the 4.7 million formerly enslaved African Americans listed on the 1870 United States census, the first census to list African Americans entirely as free people. QR codes on display near the monument allow visitors to find other African Americans listed in later censuses with the same surname. The park includes 170-year-old dwellings from nearby cotton plantations, objects made by enslaved persons, replicas of rail cars and holding pens, and audio recordings of people speaking in the Muscogee language, the language of the indigenous people of the park's area. The park also includes various sculptures created by Charles Gaines, Alison Saar, and Kwame Akoto-Bamfo, Simone Leigh, Wangechi Mutu, Rose B. Simpson, Theaster Gates, Kehinde Wiley, and Hank Willis Thomas. The park opened on March 27, 2024. Stevenson stated to W that the idea was inspired by his 2021 visit to a former slave plantation (his first visit to any plantation), which he felt marginalized the slave experience in favor of the slaveowner's mansion's architecture.

== Other exhibits ==
In 2019, the initiative cooperated with the Levine Museum of the New South in preparing their exhibit "The Legacy of Lynching: Confronting Racial Terror in America".
