= Kenya Parham =

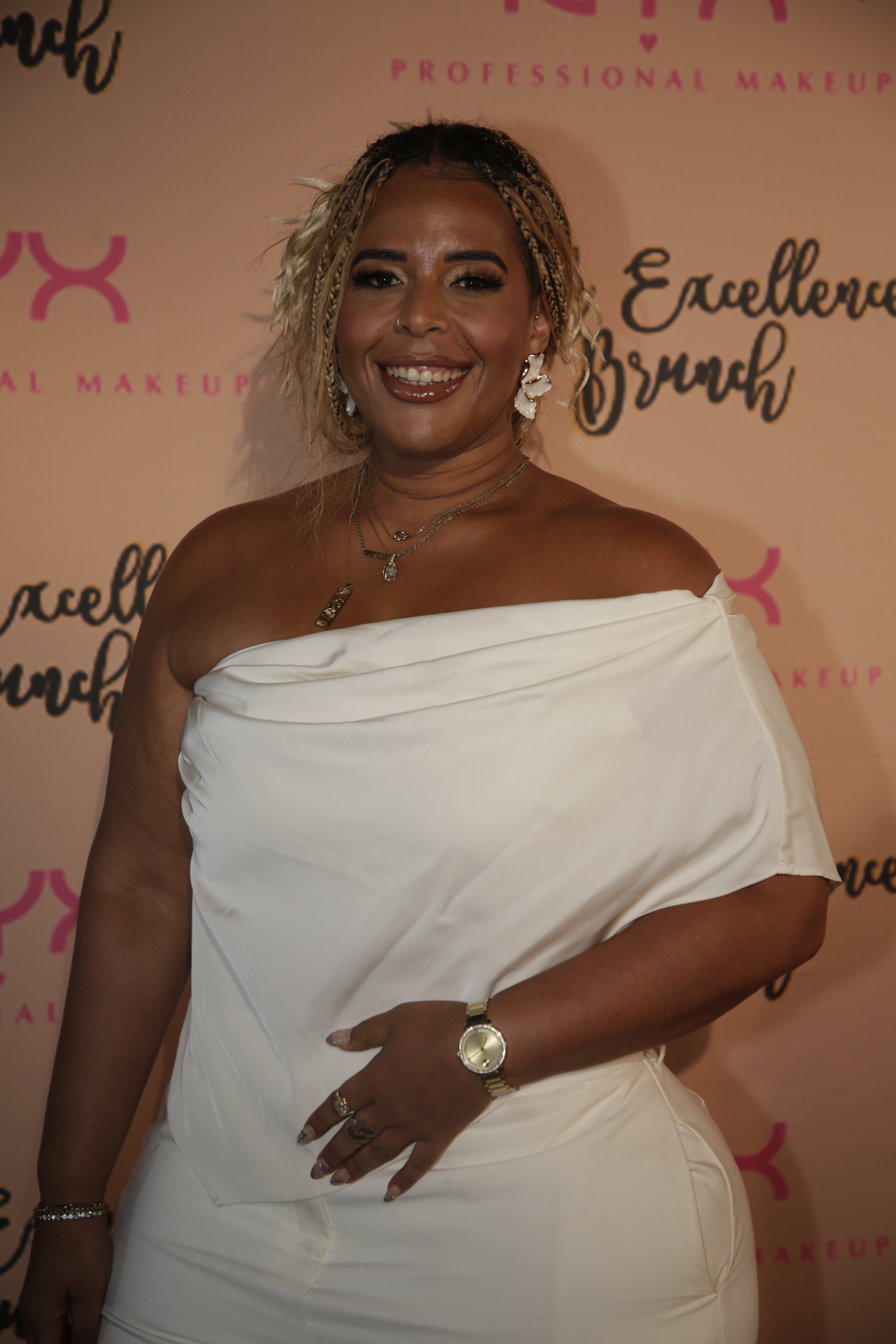
- Purham at Black Excellence Brunch 2026.

Kenya Parham is an American cultural strategist who is the chief growth officer for the social media app SPILL.

== Early life ==
Parham was born to educators Davida Hopkins-Parham and Thomas A. Parham in Los Angeles.

== Career ==
Parham worked as a political strategist for many years before moving into entertainment. Anna Fuson of Red Sea Entertainment gave Parham an opportunity working in post production. This led Parham to becoming a cultural consultant on films Detroit, Just Mercy, and Judas and the Black Messiah. Parham served as a writer and producer on the Food Network's first Kwanzaa series, The Kwanzaa menu. Parham is acknowledged as a founding ambassador of the Smithsonian National Museum of African-American History and Culture. She has also been honored with special recognition by the Los Angeles Urban League, California State Assembly and Senate legislative bodies.

Parham created The Legacy Firm, a communications, culture and brand strategy consultancy. Parham has also served as a TV commentator helping raise awareness around cultural moments on networks such as CNN and BET.

In 2023, Parham was named the global VP of community and partnerships where she serves as the voice of Spill, a social media app created in 2022 by ex-Twitter employees. Parham serves as the voice of Spill within the company and the face of the platform to creators, communities, and media partners externally.
