= Anthony Ray Hinton =

American activist, writer, and author (born 1956)

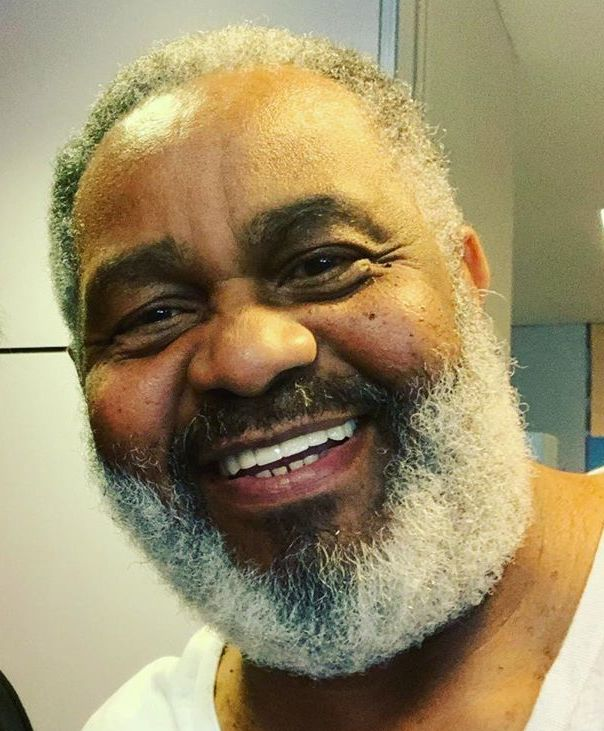
- Hinton in 2019
- Born: June 1, 1956 (age 70); Alabama, U.S.
- Occupations: Author; Activist
- Known for: Being wrongfully convicted of murder; criminal justice reform and anti-death penalty activism
- Notable work: The Sun Does Shine: How I Found Life and Freedom on Death Row
- Criminal information
- Status: Exonerated
- Convictions: Capital murder (2 counts; overturned)
- Penalty: Death (overturned)

Anthony Ray Hinton (born June 1, 1956) is an American activist, writer, and author who was wrongly convicted of the 1985 murders of two fast food restaurant managers in Birmingham, Alabama. Hinton was sentenced to death and held on the state's death row for 28 years before his 2015 release.

In 2014 the Supreme Court of the United States unanimously overturned his conviction on appeal, after which the state dismissed all charges against him. The court was unable to affirm the forensic evidence of a gun, which was a key piece of evidence in the first trial. After being released, Hinton wrote and published a memoir The Sun Does Shine: How I Found Life and Freedom on Death Row (2018). Hinton was portrayed by O'Shea Jackson Jr. in the 2019 film Just Mercy.

== Background ==
On February 25, 1985, and July 2, 1985, two fast food managers, John Davidson and Thomas Wayne Vason, were killed in separate incidents during armed robberies at their fast food restaurants in Birmingham. A survivor of a third restaurant robbery (Sidney Smotherman) picked a photo of Anthony Ray Hinton, then age 29, from a lineup, and the police investigated him. At the time, Hinton worked at a supermarket warehouse and lived with his mother, Buhlar Hinton, at her home in rural Alabama, about half an hour north of Birmingham.

== Arrest, prosecution, and conviction ==
During his trial, the prosecution presented evidence that Hinton had lied about his whereabouts for one of the shootings. Hinton had told his boss that he was going to be on his honeymoon in Atlanta from late June until July 4, 1985 (Hinton has never been married).

Smotherman said his attacker was driving in a large, dark-colored, mid-1970's model, possibly a Buick or Chevrolet. Hinton owned a 1974 or 1975 Chevrolet Caprice, which he claimed had been repossessed at the time. A second eyewitness identified Hinton as the man he saw following Smotherman shortly before Smotherman was shot.

A third witness, Reginald White, an employee at the store where Smotherman was shot, had known Hinton for years but had not seen him in the past four years until about two weeks prior to the robbery. Hinton asked White whether he still worked at the store, who the manager was, what type of car the manager drove, and what time the restaurant closed. Smotherman, who was the manager, said his attacker had followed him to his car, told him that he had been waiting for him, and said he had to be in Atlanta in three hours.

According to Hinton, shortly after his arrest, Detective Doug Acker told him, "I don't care whether you did or didn't do it. In fact, I believe you didn't do it. But it doesn't matter. If you didn't do it, one of your brothers did. And you're going to take the rap." "I can give you five reasons why they are going to convict you. Number one, you're black. Number two, a white man gonna say you shot him. Number three, you're gonna have a white district attorney. Number four, you're gonna have a white judge. And number five, you're gonna have an all-white jury."

Hinton's public defense attorney did not provide adequate counsel. According to Hinton, upon meeting Hinton, he said, "Listen, all y'all always doing something and saying you're innocent." The credibility of his ballistics expert - the only one the attorney thought he could hire with the funds available - was discredited by the prosecutor due to the expert's physical limitations and lack of experience. The jury disregarded the testimony of Hinton's boss, who testified that he was at work during the time of the crimes.

A key piece of evidence at the trial was a statement that ballistics tests showed four crime scene bullets matched Hinton's mother's gun, which was discovered at her house during the investigation. Hinton was convicted of each of the two murders and sentenced to death.

In June 1988, the unanimous Alabama Court of Criminal Appeals affirmed Hinton's conviction and death sentence. In June 1989, that judgment was affirmed by the unanimous Supreme Court of Alabama.

== Death row ==
Hinton was sent to death row in Holman Correctional Facility, where he was held in solitary confinement nearly three decades. During his decades in prison, he was supported by his mother's faith in his innocence, as well as that of longtime friend Lester Bailey, who visited him weekly. Mrs. Buhlar Hinton—Anthony's mother—died in 2002, while her then-46-year-old son was still sitting on death row.

While on death row, Hinton spent much of his time reading. He organized a book club that was allowed to meet in the prison's law library. Among the authors whom the prisoners read and discussed were James Baldwin and Harper Lee. After a few years, the club grew as the news spread quickly in the prison that reading was a good escape. However, the number of members also gradually became smaller when book club members were executed. A total of 54 men walked past Hinton's cell on their way to execution. Hinton would smell burning flesh from the electric chair, nicknamed Yellow Mama, because it was close to his cell. Finally, Hinton was the last original book club member left on death row.

=== Appeals ===
Hinton's initial appeals continued to be handled by his public defender, Sheldon C. Perhacs, who lost each of Hinton's cases. Perhacs hired a civil engineer who had impaired vision and didn't have any forensic experience. The engineer said that there wasn't any connection between the weapon and the shooting. However, the jury disregarded his testimony because of his poor eyesight and inability to use the microscope correctly.

Doug Acker, a detective, attempted to persuade Hinton to sign a blank sheet of paper, telling him [Hinton] that it was just to confirm that he had already read his rights. Hinton declined to sign it.

Additionally, Hinton's boss testified that Hinton was working at the time of the incident, and that he was cleaning the supermarket; despite this, the jury still convicted him.

After Hinton had been on death row for about a decade, Bryan Stevenson at the Equal Justice Initiative (EJI), a non-profit based in Montgomery, Alabama, picked up his case, handling his defense for 16 years. During the appeals, EJI introduced evidence from three forensic experts, including one from the FBI, showing that the bullets from the crime scenes did not match Hinton's mother's gun. But the state court of Alabama refused to overturn his convictions or grant a new trial.

== Exoneration, release and aftermath ==
In February 2014, the Supreme Court of the United States vacated the state court conviction in a unanimous per curiam decision. The Court ruled that Hinton's original defense lawyer had provided "constitutionally deficient" ineffective assistance of counsel, and remanded his case to the Alabama state court for retrial. Hinton's original defense lawyer had wrongly thought he had only $1,000 available to hire a ballistics expert to rebut the state's case on evidence. The only expert willing to testify at that price was a civil engineer with very little ballistics training and limited by having one eye; he admitted in court to having trouble in operating the microscope.

In November 2014, the Alabama Court of Criminal Appeals closed Hinton's case. On April 1, 2015 the Jefferson County district attorney's office moved to drop the case. Their forensics experts were unable to match crime-scene bullets to Hinton's mother's gun. Prosecutors admitted that they could not match four bullets found at the crime scene with Hinton's mother's gun.

On April 3, 2015, Hinton was released from prison after Laura Petro, a Jefferson County Circuit Court judge, overturned his conviction and the state dropped all charges against him.

Hinton is the 152nd person since 1973 to be exonerated from death row in the United States, and the sixth in the state of Alabama. He said, "Everybody that played a part in sending me to death row, you will answer to God." Hinton filed a claim for nearly $1.5 million in compensation for his time in jail due to the wrongful conviction. The legislature has resisted approval of this payment, as state authorities say that he did not prove his innocence. As of late 2022, Hinton has still not received any compensation from Alabama.

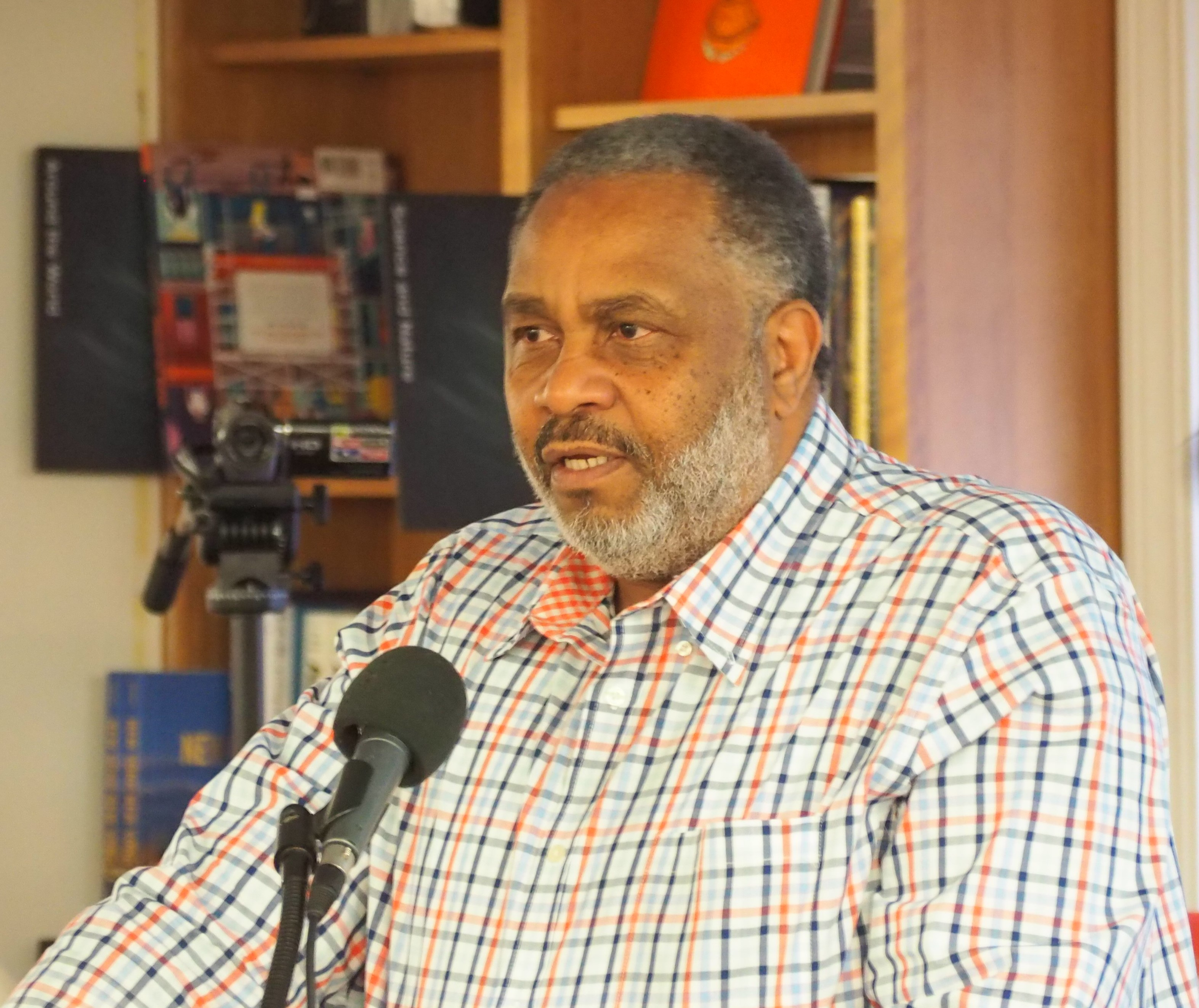
Anthony Ray Hinton speaking at Politics & Prose in 2018.

Since his release, Hinton has spoken in various venues about the injustices of the Alabama judicial system and other issues related to his conviction and imprisonment. He has spoken out against the death penalty, calling it a "form of lynching." He completed a memoir entitled The Sun Does Shine: How I Found Life and Freedom on Death Row (2018), and has given readings and talks around the country about the book and his experiences. Writing for The Guardian, Tim Adams described the book as, "a story of forgiveness and struggle" and concludes that, "his wonderful memoir recreates the ways he escaped from his cell in his head – had tea with the Queen of England, married Halle Berry – and how he shared that possibility with his fellow death row inmates." Kirkus Reviews calls the book, "a heart-wrenching yet ultimately hopeful story about truth, justice, and the need for criminal justice reform."

On May 19, 2019, Hinton spoke at St. Bonaventure University's commencement exercises and was awarded an honorary Doctor of Human Letters degree. He had previously spoken to the students of the Class of 2019, six months after his release, in 2015. The students had been so inspired by his earlier address that over 100 of them submitted a petition to the university administration, asking that he be invited to speak at commencement.

On May 8, 2023, he gave a commencement speech and was received an honorary Doctor of Letters degree from Emory University. Hinton continues to work with Bryan Stevenson's EJI as a community educator and advocates for criminal justice reform.

== See also ==
- Capital punishment in the United States
- List of wrongful convictions in the United States
- Equal Justice Initiative
