= Just Mercy (soundtrack) =

Just Mercy (Original Motion Picture Soundtrack)

Film score by Joel P. West
- Released: December 13, 2019
- Studio: Eastwood Scoring Stage, Warner Bros. Studios, Burbank, California; Capitol Studios, Hollywood, California
- Genre: Film score
- Length: 35:18
- Label: WaterTower Music
- Producer: Joel P. West

Joel P. West chronology
All Summers End (2018)	Just Mercy (2021)	Shang-Chi and the Legend of the Ten Rings (2021)

Just Mercy (Original Motion Picture Soundtrack) is the film score to the 2019 film Just Mercy directed by Destin Daniel Cretton starring Michael B. Jordan, Jamie Foxx, Rob Morgan, Tim Blake Nelson, Rafe Spall, and Brie Larson. The film score is composed by Joel P. West and released through WaterTower Music on December 13, 2019.

== Background ==
Joel P. West renewed his association with Cretton for the fourth time since I Am Not a Hipster (2012). Like all of his films, West began working on the film, reading the script and familiarizing with it very early and began developing his musical ideas thereafter. He wrote much of the music even before the film's production began. West admitted that much of the crew worked on the film to make it true and feel human and wanted to bring the humanity towards it. West wanted to make the music feel more personal and beautiful. The musical process started with him diving deeper into the musical world of Bryan Stevenson who was also a musician. He added, "The ugly truths he is working to correct are overwhelming and hard to stomach, and ultimately we were trying to develop score music that might bring some of the same dignity, hope and beauty that Bryan brings to people stuck in those shadows."

Once Cretton and West sorted out the ideas, the process became an open-ended collaboration with the filmmakers, musicians and rest of the crew. West wrote the rhythm parts as rough outlines, which were performed by drummer Karriem Riggins, bassist Thomas Drayton, keyboardist Lynette Williams, guitarist Justus West at the Capitol Studios, whose performance brought an undeniable "unique energy" in the studios. Afterwards, he spent a day recording the strings and choir at the Warner Bros. Eastwood Scoring Stage.

== Reception ==
Ann Hornaday of The Washington Post called it "a liltingly beautiful musical score". John DeFore of The Hollywood Reporter wrote "Joel P West's score is one of the best of the year, complementing the narrative tone by weaving gently through with both hope and despair." Owen Gleiberman of Variety called the music as "emotional". Sean Patrick of Vocal Media wrote "The score of Just Mercy, must by Joel P. West, is a fine and sturdy one that lays in perfectly as underscore to the action without ever becoming unbearable or pushy." Blavity wrote "From the stirring score by Joel P. West to the use of hymns and songs like No More Auction Block For Me, the music underscores the timelessness of this 1990s injustice story and reminds us that the history of Black people in America is also the present."

Hanna Azarya Samosir of CNN Indonesia wrote "In addition to the songs, Joel P. West's soundtrack for Just Mercy also beautifully encapsulates the various scenes. It's no surprise to hear West admit that he had all the music in mind a year before Cretton began filming."

== Track listing ==
No.	Title	Length
1.	"Just Mercy"	2:01
2.	"Holman Prison"	1:19
3.	"Johnny D"	2:02
4.	"Jackson Cleaners"	2:16
5.	"Walter's Case"	1:16
6.	"Tell Me Everything"	1:05
7.	"Tapes"	1:44
8.	"We're Done Here"	0:50
9.	"Everybody Out"	1:04
10.	"Petition"	1:15
11.	"Courthouse"	1:28
12.	"Nowhere Near True"	2:05
13.	"Hearing"	1:40
14.	"Church"	0:55
15.	"60 Minutes"	3:20
16.	"Freedom"	4:17
17.	"Equal Justice"	2:10
18.	"The Old Rugged Cross"	4:31
Total length:		35:18

== Personnel ==
Credits adapted from liner notes:

- Music composer and producer – Joel P. West
- Recording, mixing and mastering – Chris Hobson
- Score editor – Del Spiva
- Pro-tools operator – Larry Mah
- Music consultant – Peter Rotter
- Music coordinator – Kari Miazek
- Copyist – Joanne Kane Music Service
- Art direction – Sandeep Sriram

Orchestra

- Orchestra – Hollywood Studio Symphony
- Orchestrator and conductor – Mark Graham
- Concertmaster – Serena McKinney

Instrumentalists

- Bass – Nico Carmine Abondolo, Stephen Dress, Thomas Harte, Michael Valerio
- Cello – Adrienne Woods, Armen Ksajikian, Eric Byers, Giovanna Clayton, Michelle Rearick, Steve Erdody, Vanessa Freebairn-Smith, Jacob Braun
- Electric bass – Thomas Drayton
- Viola – Corinne Sobolewski, David Walther, John Zach Dellinger, Michael Larco, Michael Nowak, Michael Whitson, Robert A. Brophy, Shawn Mann, Travis Maril, Andrew Duckles
- Violin – Amy Hershberger, Ana Landauer, Benjamin Jacobson, Bruce Dukov, Crystal Alforque, Grace Oh, Helen Nightengale, Ken Aiso, Lorenz Gamma, Luanne Homzy, Lucia Micarelli, Marisa Kuney, Minyoung Chang, Nadira Scruggs, Nina Evtuhov, Philip Payton, Phillip Levy, Sara Parkins, Songa Lee, Stephanie Matthews, Tamara Hatwan,Charlie Bisharat

Choir

- Choir conductor – Jasper Randall
- Alto – Clydene Jackson, Jessica Rotter, Sara Mann, Toni Scruggs
- Bass – Alvin Chea, Gregory Fletcher
- Soprano – Aretha Scruggs, Briana Lee, Charlean Carmon, Denise Carite
- Tenor – Charles Jones, John Fluker

Soloists

- Bass – Thomas Drayton
- Drums – Karriem Riggins
- Guitar – Justus West
- Piano, electric piano, organ – Lynette Williams

Management

- Executive in charge of WaterTower Music – Jason Linn
- Executive in charge of music for Warner Bros. Pictures – Darren Higman, Paul Broucek
- Music business affairs – Ari Taitz
