= Alan W. Clarke =

American academic

Alan William Clarke
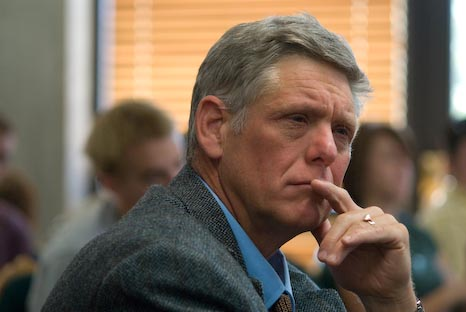
- Born: August 19, 1949 (age 77)
- Citizenship: Canadian resident
- Known for: Opposition to the death penalty

Academic background
- Education: College of William and Mary; Queen's University; Osgoode Hall Law School, York University (PhD)
- Thesis: Procedural Labyrinths and the Injustice of Death: A Critique of Death Penalty Habeas Corpus (1994)

Academic work
- Discipline: Law
- Sub-discipline: Civil rights
- Institutions: Utah Valley University (since 2003); Osgoode Hall Law School

Alan W. Clarke (born August 19, 1949) is a lawyer best known for his work opposing the death penalty. He has pursued his position as a student, as a practicing lawyer, as a professor, and as a mentor to the movement.

Clarke began his campaign as a graduate student, criticizing the death penalty in his doctoral work. He practiced criminal defense including capital cases. Since 2003 he has been at Utah Valley University, where he is a professor of Integrated Studies, and has been an active publisher. Most recently, his role has included review of current studies of the death penalty and been sponsor of annual death penalty symposia since 2005.

== Education ==
Clarke did his undergraduate work at the College of William and Mary, where he also finished his Juris Doctor degree. His thesis at Queen's University, Kingston, Ontario for the LL.M. 1994, is titled "Procedural Labyrinths and the Injustice of Death: A Critique of Death Penalty Habeas Corpus." A recent book (with Laurelyn Whitt, Fall 2007), "The Strange Fruit of American Justice: International and Domestic Resistance to the Death Penalty," argues that executions in the U.S. have far-reaching effects on relationships between the U.S. and other countries worldwide.

== Legal work ==
Clarke's trial experience has been in Indian law, capital murder, and habeas corpus (including death row representation). He has been an ACLU cooperating attorney, including voting rights litigation for the Virginia ACLU. He was chairman of the Midwestern Criminal Justice Association Death Penalty Panel. In 2008 he received an award from the NAACP for his voting-rights work in Lancaster County, Virginia.

Clarke helped organize the first successful fishermen's union south of Mason–Dixon line in 1988 - Reedville Fishermen's Association. He was counsel for "Fight For Justice," a group of dissident Anishinaabe at Keweenaw Bay Indian Community in a struggle to regain voting rights arbitrarily stripped by the Tribal Council. He assisted lawyers in Mexico in representation of a transportation workers union, SUTAUR, which was illegally declared bankrupt and its leaders and lawyers jailed after the union expressed its support for the EZLN uprising in Chiapas.

== Academic work ==
Since 2005, Clarke has organized international symposia on the death penalty, bringing together activists like Sister Helen Prejean, author of Dead Man Walking, with scholars like Robert Johnson, Professor of Justice, Law, and Society at American University, Michael Radelet, Professor of Sociology and Chair, Department of Sociology, University of Colorado, Boulder, Mark Warren, Director of Human Rights Research and Daniel Medwed, Professor of Law at the University of Utah.

Clarke is now often called on to review others' work on the death penalty.

- Book Review – Just Mercy: A Story of Justice and Redemption by Bryan Stevenson
- Book Review—Most Deserving of Death? An Analysis of the Supreme Court's Death Penalty Jurisprudence

== Selected publications ==
- Alan W. Clark, Virginia's Capital Murder Sentencing Proceeding: A Defense Perspective (1984)
- Alan W. Clarke, Rendition to Torture: A Critical Legal History, 62 RUTGERS LAW REVIEW 1 (2009).
- Alan W. Clarke, Terrorism, Extradition, and the Death Penalty (2003)
- Alan W. Clarke, Laurelyn Whitt, The Bitter Fruit of American Justice: International and Domestic Resistance to the Death Penalty, Northeastern (November 30, 2007).
- Alan W. Clarke, Eric Lambert, and Laurie Anne Whitt, Executing the Innocent: The Next Step in the Marshall Hypothesis, 26 NEW YORK UNIVERSITY REVIEW OF LAW & SOCIAL CHANGE 309 (2000–2001)
- Alan W. Clarke and Laurie Anne Whitt, University Senates and the Law: A Case Study 15 THOUGHT AND ACTION: THE NEA HIGHER EDUCATION JOURNAL, No. 2, 119 (Fall 1999).
- Alan W. Clarke, Procedural Labyrinths and the Injustice of Death: A Critique of Death Penalty Habeas Corpus, (Part Two), 30 UNIVERSITY OF RICHMOND LAW REVIEW 303 (1996).
- Alan W. Clarke, Procedural Labyrinths and the Injustice of Death: A Critique of Death Penalty Habeas Corpus, (Part One), 29 UNIVERSITY OF RICHMOND LAW REVIEW 1327 (1995).
