= Lee Talley =

American businessman

- Born: 1901; Monroeville, Alabama, United States
- Died: 1976 (aged 74–75)
- Education: Emory University
- Occupation: Business executive
- Known for: Former president and chair of The Coca-Cola Company

Lee Talley (1901–1976) was an American business executive who served as the president and chair of The Coca-Cola Company.

== Early life and education ==
Lee Talley was born in Monroeville, Alabama to a Methodist minister. He graduated from Emory University in 1923.

== Career ==
Talley joined Coca-Cola in Atlanta in 1923. During his early career, he served as a branch manager of Coca-Cola in Vancouver and regional manager in Toronto.

In 1943, Talley became the vice president of the Coca-Cola Export Corporation in New York. He was promoted to president of the corporation in 1954, succeeding James Farley. The board of the parent company appointed him president in 1958 and chairman in 1962.

Talley also served as a trustee for Emory University.
