= Just Mercy (book) =

2014 book by Bryan Stevenson

- First edition
- Author: Bryan Stevenson
- Publisher: Spiegel & Grau
- Publication date: October 21, 2014
- Pages: 336
- Awards: American Library Association Notable Book (2015); Andrew Carnegie Medal for Excellence in Nonfiction (2015); Dayton Literary Peace Prize for Nonfiction (2015); NAACP Image Award for Outstanding Literary Work – Nonfiction (2015)
- ISBN: 978-0-8129-9452-0
- OCLC: 877914371
- Dewey Decimal: 353.48092
- LC Class: KF373.S743
- Website: justmercy.eji.org
- All identifiers refer to the hardcover edition published in 2014 unless otherwise noted

Just Mercy: A Story of Justice and Redemption (2014) is a memoir by American attorney Bryan Stevenson that documents his career defending disadvantaged clients. The book, focusing on injustices in the United States judicial system, alternates chapters between documenting Stevenson's efforts to overturn the wrongful conviction of Walter McMillian and his work on other cases, including children who receive life sentences, and other poor or marginalized clients.

The memoir has received many honors and won multiple non-fiction book awards. It was a New York Times best seller and spent more than 230 weeks on the paperback nonfiction best sellers list. It won the 2015 Andrew Carnegie Medal for Excellence in Nonfiction, given annually by the American Library Association. The book was also awarded the 2015 Dayton Literary Peace Prize for Nonfiction and the 2015 NAACP Image Award for Outstanding Literary Work in Nonfiction. It was named one of "10 of the decade's most influential books" in December 2019 by CNN.

Published in hardcover and digital formats in 2014 by Spiegel & Grau, then an imprint of Penguin Random House, it was released by Random House Audio in audiobook format read by Stevenson. It has also been published in paperback. A young adult adaptation was published by Delacorte Press on September 18, 2018. The memoir was adapted as a 2019 movie of the same name by Destin Daniel Cretton. To commemorate the film, "Movie Tie-In" editions were released for both versions of the memoir on December 3, 2019 by imprints of Penguin Random House.

== Background ==
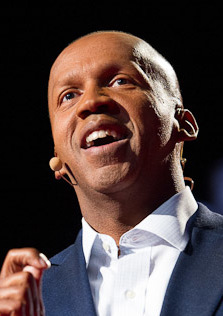
Stevenson in 2012

Stevenson, a lawyer and the founder of the Equal Justice Initiative, graduated from Harvard Law School. He was inspired to become a lawyer in part by his grandfather's murder, which occurred when he was sixteen. He earned his undergraduate degree from Eastern University, known as Eastern College at the time, and began his career as a lawyer for the poor in Georgia before moving to Alabama and founding the Equal Justice Initiative.

Stevenson pitched the idea for the memoir to Chris Jackson of Spiegel & Grau based on a TED talk he had given, and was signed immediately. The title was chosen to help convey the book's message that justice and mercy are not mutually exclusive. Stevenson features his work on appeals for Walter McMillian, who is featured in the book. This case was explored during a 1992 60 Minutes episode, and in the book Circumstantial Evidence: Death, Life, and Justice in a Southern Town (1995) by journalist Pete Earley.

== Overview ==
The book is a memoir about Stevenson's career as a lawyer and his work for poor clients, largely focusing on his efforts to overturn the wrongful conviction of Walter McMillian for the murder of Ronda Morrison. Stevenson began working on the case in the 1980s, while McMillian was on death row. The case is revisited throughout the book and serves as the primary narrative; the chapters of the book alternate between visiting various aspects of the McMillian case over time (odd chapters) and Stevenson's work on other cases (even chapters).

Based largely on testimony from a police informant, McMillian was convicted and sentenced to death for the murder of Ronda Morrison, a young white woman, in Monroeville, Alabama (the hometown of writers Harper Lee, who wrote To Kill a Mockingbird, and Truman Capote). The jury at McMillian's trial, which included only one Black person, returned a sentence of life in prison. The presiding judge overruled them and imposed a death sentence in the case. In 1993 McMillian was acquitted when all charges were dropped, after he had spent six years on death row for the murder, including more than a year before his trial.

The book also provides a brief history of the Equal Justice Initiative. Stevenson concentrates on the injustices that occur in the United States' criminal justice system, which had the world's highest incarceration rate and population at the time of publication. Stevenson recounts his first meeting with a death-row inmate in 1983, when he was a law student and intern in Georgia for the Southern Prisoners Defense Committee. (Now the Southern Center for Human Rights, based in Atlanta). Stevenson explores the path of his career over thirty years, and the book ends in 2013, with the natural death of McMillian.

Stevenson documents his work for other marginalized clients, including efforts to overturn and ban mandatory life sentences without parole given to defendants convicted of crimes committed as juveniles. Among other high profile cases, Stevenson worked in Miller v. Alabama, in which he successfully argued before the Supreme Court of the United States in 2012 that mandatory life sentences without parole for minors, even in cases of murder, were a violation of the Eighth Amendment to the United States Constitution prohibiting "cruel and unusual punishment". The memoir also describes cases of abuse of power by police, judges and prosecutors in the criminal justice system.

== Reception ==
The book was widely reviewed and praised by journalists and leading figures in social justice and culture. As of summer 2016, the book had been adopted by more than twenty colleges and universities as "college-level reading" assigned to incoming freshmen.

In 2020 Oprah Winfrey wrote: "When I wanted to deepen my understanding of mass incarceration and social justice, I was guided by Bryan Stevenson's masterful Just Mercy". Attorney and writer John Grisham said that the book is an "inspiring and powerful story". Nobel Peace Prize laureate Desmond Tutu wrote the book "is as gripping as it is disturbing—as if America's soul has been put on trial." Tutu also wrote that the book:

should be read by people of conscience in every civilized country in the world to discover what happens when revenge and retribution replace justice and mercy. It is as gripping to read as any legal thriller, and what hangs in the balance is nothing less than the soul of a great nation.

Tutu has referred to Stevenson as "America's Nelson Mandela".

Critic A. O. Scott wrote that it "is a painful, beautiful, revelatory book, the kind of reading experience that can permanently alter your understanding of the world." Nicholas Kristof praised the book as a "searing, moving and infuriating memoir". After reading the book Jonathan Lavine, an executive for Bain Capital, donated US$1 million to the Equal Justice Initiative, saying "I was beside myself."

=== Reviews ===
Among others, the book was reviewed by Alan W. Clarke, David D. Cole, Ted Conover, and Rob Warden. In his review, Alan Clarke wrote: "One follows in awe as Stevenson overcomes one obstacle after another". David Cole wrote in a second review of the book: "Every bit as moving as To Kill a Mockingbird, and in some way more so". In his review, Ted Conover wrote that the memoir "aggregates and personalizes the struggle against injustice in the story of one activist lawyer" and that "[y]ou don't have to read too long to start cheering for this man". Conover summarized the book's message as "evil can be overcome, a difference can be made". In his review, Rob Warden wrote that the book "is an easy read" and is "a work of style, substance and clarity".

The Financial Times said the book is "[a]s deeply moving, poignant and powerful a book as has been, and maybe ever can be, written about the death penalty." Kirkus Reviews described it as "Emotionally profound, necessary reading."

== Awards and honors ==
It was named as one of the best nonfiction books of 2014 by many different publications. It won several awards, including the 2015 Andrew Carnegie Medal for Excellence in Nonfiction, given annually by the American Library Association. Stevenson's acceptance speech for the award was said to be the best many of the librarians at the conference had ever heard; it was published in Publishers Weekly. The journal included a version of the article at the end of the year in a story titled "PW's Top 10 Library Stories of 2015".

The book was awarded the 2015 Dayton Literary Peace Prize for Nonfiction, and the 2015 NAACP Image Award for Outstanding Literary Work in Nonfiction. The book was also a finalist for the 2014 Kirkus Prize for Nonfiction, a finalist for the 2015 Los Angeles Times Book Prize,, and was nominated for the 2015 Warwick Prize for Writing.

Year	Award	Category	Result	Ref(s)
2014	Carla Furstenberg Cohen Literary Prize	Nonfiction	Won	
2014	Kirkus Prize	Nonfiction	Nominated (Finalist)	
2015	Andrew Carnegie Medals for Excellence in Fiction and Nonfiction	Nonfiction	Won	
2015	Warwick Prize for Writing	Non-fiction	Nominated (Longlist)	
2015	Los Angeles Times Book Prize	Current Interest	Nominated (Finalist)	
2015	Dayton Literary Peace Prize	Non-Fiction	Won	
2015	NAACP Image Awards	Outstanding Literary Work – Nonfiction	Won	
2017	The Stowe Prize for Writing to Advance Social Justice	N/A	Won	

=== Best books lists ===
It was ranked as among the top nonfiction books of 2014 by The New York Times, The Washington Post, The Boston Globe, The Seattle Times, and Time.

It retained high standing: in 2018 book was listed as one of the "Top 10 books about miscarriages of justice" by The Guardian. In December 2019, CNN included it in a list of the decade's '10 most influential books', noting that it "is a compelling portrait of a lawyer dedicated to exposing the inequities of the US criminal justice system" and that "Stevenson masterfully connects his own fight with the struggles of McMillian and a few of his other former clients and personalizes the nation's raging debate on racial injustice and criminal justice reform."

- Named as an American Library Association Notable Book in 2015.
- Named number four of the "Top 10 Nonfiction Books" in 2014 by Time
- Named one of "The 5 Most Important Books of 2014" by Esquire
- Named one of the "100 Notable Books of 2014" by The New York Times Book Review.
- Named one of "50 notable works of nonfiction" in 2014 by The Washington Post
- The Boston Globe ranked it as among "Best nonfiction of 2014"
- Named one of 35 "Best books of 2014" by The Seattle Times
- Named one of Kirkus Reviews' "Best Books of 2014"

=== Reading lists ===
- Included in "An Anti-Racist Nonfiction Reading List" by Publishers Weekly in June 2020.
- Included in "20 Books For 2020: A Reading List On Race In America" by Forbes in June 2020
- Oprah Winfrey included the book in an article on "books that changed her life" in early 2020.
- Former President Barack Obama included the book in his 2019 Black History Month reading list, prepared for celebration of the fifth anniversary of his "My Brother's Keeper" initiative.

== Adaptations ==
=== Movie ===
The book was adapted into a feature-length film of the same name (2019). The screenplay was written by Destin Daniel Cretton and Andrew Lanham. Directed by Cretton, the movie stars Michael B. Jordan as Stevenson and Jamie Foxx as McMillian. Other actors include Rob Morgan, Tim Blake Nelson, Rafe Spall, O'Shea Jackson Jr., and Brie Larson. The Los Angeles Times ranked it among the "Best of 2019: 8 of the most memorable book-to-film releases".

=== Audio book ===
The 2014 audiobook version is read by Bryan Stevenson and available for free.

=== Young adult book ===
Just Mercy: Adapted for Young Adults: A True Story of the Fight for Justice is an adaption of the book aimed towards young adults that was published by Delacorte Press on September 18, 2018. The book debuted as the Publishers Weekly number one young adult best seller in September 2019. The book made the New York Times Best Sellers Young Adult Paperback list in January 2020. Among other honors, it shared the 2019 Flora Stieglitz Straus Award with Dreamers by Yuyi Morales, an award given each year by the Children's Book Committee of the Bank Street College of Education for an outstanding work in children's nonfiction. Kirkus Reviews posted an article on the book saying it "is required reading, embracing the ideals that 'we all need mercy, we all need justice, and—perhaps—we all need some measure of unmerited grace.'" The book has also been included in reading lists by various publications, such as USA Today who named it as one of "17 kids books to read for Black History Month".

On August 7, 2023, the book was banned for "Teaching About Controversial Issues" by Yorkville, Illinois Community School District 115 Board of Education, after a closed door meeting. On December 27, 2023, Deputy Illinois Attorney General Brent Stratton ruled the meeting illegal under the State of Illinois Open Meetings Act (OMA).

== Publication history ==
=== Sales ===
The book was a New York Times best seller, peaking at the number one spot in combined nonfiction sales on February 2, 2020, it has spent over 35 weeks on the combined nonfiction best sellers list, and it has spent over 230 weeks on the paperback nonfiction best sellers list. It is also a USA Today Best-Selling Book, having spent over 30 weeks on their overall list and peaking at number six for the week ending on August 22, 2020. After being promoted by Starbucks in late 2015, the book made number eight on the Publishers Weekly Best Sellers list for the week of September 7, 2015, selling over twenty-five thousand copies that week. The book was simultaneously included on their "Trade Paperback" list at number two, after debuting on the list the week before at number twelve with four thousand copies sold. The magazine published an article noting that, while it had sold fifty-four thousand print editions of the book since its release in 2014, the sales had been slow and steady so that it had not previously made it on any of the lists. After sales slowed down following the 2015 Holiday season, the book reappeared on the Trade Paperback list at number 18 on July 25, 2016.

The book made several bestsellers lists in 2020, including peaking at number one on the Los Angeles Times Nonfiction Best Sellers List on February 23, 2020. Upon the release of the "Movie Tie-In Edition", the audiobook made Publishers Weekly's list of "Apple Books Category Bestsellers" at number three on the week of March 8, 2020. The book, along with several others, reentered the USA Today Best-Selling list in the wake of the murder of George Floyd in late-May 2020, when several related popular titles sold out in stores like Amazon and Barnes & Noble as there was a large surge in demand for books on racial justice. Publishers Weekly reported that the book had sold nearly 14,000 copies over the week ending on May 30, 2020, while it had only sold 5000 copies the week before. The book remained a top 50 seller for the month of June, having sold over 168 thousand copies from January through June 2020. Forbes noted that, since the start of the George Floyd protests, sales of anti-racism books, including Just Mercy, jumped by over 2000%, with the book selling over 100 thousand copies between May and June 2020 alone. As of December 15, 2020, the book remains on The Washington Post's nonfiction paperback best sellers list, having peaked at number one on the list on February 12, 2020.

=== Original version ===
- Hardcover: Stevenson, Bryan (October 21, 2014). Just Mercy: A Story of Justice and Redemption (1st ed.). New York: Spiegel & Grau. ISBN 978-0-8129-9452-0. OCLC 877914371.
- Paperback: Stevenson, Bryan (August 18, 2015). Just Mercy: A Story of Justice and Redemption (1st ed.). New York: One World. ISBN 978-0-812-98496-5. OCLC 877914371.
- Digital: Stevenson, Bryan (October 21, 2014). Just Mercy: A Story of Justice and Redemption (1st ed.). New York: Spiegel & Grau. ISBN 978-0-8129-9453-7. OCLC 877914371.
- CD: Stevenson, Bryan (October 21, 2014). Just Mercy: A Story of Justice and Redemption (1st ed.). New York: Random House Audio. ISBN 978-0-553-55060-3. OCLC 875246893.
- Audiobook: Stevenson, Bryan (October 21, 2014). Just Mercy: A Story of Justice and Redemption (1st ed.). New York: Random House Audio. ISBN 978-0-553-55061-0. OCLC 875246893.

=== Young adult version ===
- Paperback: Stevenson, Bryan (September 10, 2019). Just Mercy: Adapted for Young Adults: A True Story of the Fight for Justice (1st ed.). New York: Ember Publishing. ISBN 978-0-525-58006-5. OCLC 1020311553.
- Hardcover: Stevenson, Bryan (September 18, 2018). Just Mercy: Adapted for Young Adults: A True Story of the Fight for Justice (1st ed.). New York: Delacorte Press. ISBN 978-0-525-58003-4. OCLC 1020311553.
- Hardcover: Stevenson, Bryan (June 24, 2020). Just Mercy: Adapted for Young Adults: A True Story of the Fight for Justice (Large print ed.). Waterville, Maine: Delacorte Press. ISBN 978-1-4328-7863-4. OCLC 1159241103.
- Digital: Stevenson, Bryan (September 1, 2018). Just Mercy: Adapted for Young Adults: A True Story of the Fight for Justice (1st ed.). New York: Delacorte Press. ISBN 978-0-525-58005-8. OCLC 1020311553.
- Audiobook: Stevenson, Bryan (September 18, 2018), Just Mercy: Adapted for Young Adults: A True Story of the Fight for Justice (1st ed.), New York: Listening Library, ISBN 978-0-525-63592-5, OCLC 1041858523
- CD: Stevenson, Bryan (September 18, 2018), Just Mercy: Adapted for Young Adults: A True Story of the Fight for Justice (1st ed.), New York: Listening Library, ISBN 978-0-525-63592-5, OCLC 1041858523

=== Movie Tie-In Edition ===
- Paperback: Stevenson, Bryan (December 3, 2019). Just Mercy: A Story of Justice and Redemption (Movie Tie-In ed.). New York: One World. ISBN 978-0-593-13393-4. OCLC 1128270554.
- Paperback: Stevenson, Bryan (December 3, 2019). Just Mercy: Adapted for Young Adults: A True Story of the Fight for Justice (Movie Tie-In ed.). New York: Ember Publishing. ISBN 978-0-593-17704-4. OCLC 1020311553.

== See also ==
- The Color of Law
- Race in the United States criminal justice system
- Race and crime in the United States
