= Alonzo Tucker =

Alonzo Tucker may refer to:

- Alonzo Tucker (lynching victim), African American murder victim from Oregon
- Alonzo Tucker, American musician and founder of The Midnighters
- Alonzo P. Tucker, a recurring character in the TV series Lost in Space portrayed by Albert Salmi
