= Jacob Vanderpool =

African American sailor and buisnessman

Jacob Vanderpool was an African-American who is the only known person to be expelled from Oregon under their exclusion laws.

Vanderpool, a sailor from the West Indies, came to Oregon in 1850 on board a ship called the Louisiana. Vanderpool came to Oregon to launch a career in business. After being denied a land claim because he was black, Vanderpool opened a saloon, restaurant and boarding home in Oregon City. However, the book Peculiar Paradise states that his businesses were located in Salem, across the street from the offices of the Oregon Statesman. On August 20, 1851, a settler named Theophilus Magruder identified Vanderpool as a "mulatto" and lodged a complaint that Vanderpool was in violation of the second exclusion act, passed on September 21, 1849. This second exclusion law was passed specifically to target African American seamen who may be tempted to jump ship. US Marshal Joseph L. Meek arrested Vanderpool before his expulsion from the state.

== Legal case ==
In the trial of Theophilus Magruder v. Jacob Vanderpool, the defense attorney argued that the exclusion law, passed in 1849, was unconstitutional because it had not been legally approved by the legislature. In addition, the law was put in place to prevent black people from moving to Oregon, not removing those people of color who had already established residency. Therefore, the law did not apply to Vanderpool. The prosecution called three witnesses to verify the date Vanderpool arrived in Oregon Country. The testimonies of all three witnesses, however, were vague. Nevertheless, the next day, Judge Thomas Nelson (who was also the first to hear Holmes v. Ford) found Vanderpool guilty of violating the exclusion law and ordered him to leave the territory within thirty days. Vanderpool was removed from the region by a court-appointed official. Only six days elapsed from the time he was accused of violating the exclusion law to his expulsion.

== After expulsion ==
There is no formal record of what happened to Vanderpool after he left Oregon, nor are there any pictures of him. It is possible that he moved to San Francisco to work as a hardware packer, since the 1870 Census recorded a fifty-year-old man named Jacob Vanderpool living in that city with a woman named Mary Vanderpool.

== Memorial ==
In July 2022 and February 2024, it was reported that the Oregon Remembrance Project was working with the Confederated Tribes of the Grand Ronde Community of Oregon to memorialize Vanderpool at the spot where Vanderpool’s business previously existed in Oregon City.
