= Walter McMillian =

American wrongly convicted of murder (1941–2013)

- Born: October 27, 1941; Alabama, U.S.
- Died: September 11, 2013 (aged 71); Alabama City, Alabama
- Other name: Johnny D.
- Known for: Wrongful conviction of murder popularized in Just Mercy

Walter "Johnny D." McMillian (October 27, 1941 – September 11, 2013) was a pulpwood worker from Monroeville, Alabama, who was wrongfully convicted of murder. His conviction was wrongfully obtained, based on police coercion and perjury. In the 1988 trial, under a controversial and now abolished Alabama doctrine known as judicial override, the judge imposed the death penalty, although the jury had voted for a sentence of life imprisonment.

From 1990 to 1993, the Alabama Court of Criminal Appeals turned down four appeals. In 1993, after McMillian had served six years on Alabama's death row, the Court of Criminal Appeals reversed the lower court decision and ruled that he had been wrongfully convicted.

The controversial case received national attention beginning in the fall of 1992. Bryan Stevenson, McMillian's defense attorney, raised awareness on the CBS News program 60 Minutes. Journalist Pete Earley covered it in his book Circumstantial Evidence: Death, Life, and Justice in a Southern Town (1995). Stevenson featured this early case of his career in a TED talk and in his memoir Just Mercy (2014). This was adapted as an eponymous feature film, released in 2019. Jamie Foxx portrays McMillian and Michael B. Jordan stars as Stevenson.

In an interview in 2005, Stevenson said the judge had inadvertently done McMillian a favor by sentencing him to death. Since McMillian had been sentenced to death, this resulted in Stevenson, who was working specifically on capital cases, taking up his case. Had McMillian instead been sentenced to life imprisonment as recommended by the jury, Stevenson said, "he would be in prison today."

== Context ==
Walter McMillian, who was born on October 27, 1941, lived in a Black settlement near Monroeville where he "grew up picking cotton." Monroe County was described by The Guardian as "a remote, dirt-poor region of pine trees and bean farms". According to his attorney Bryan Stevenson, McMillian purchased logging and paper mill equipment and became a "moderately successful businessman". A journalist described him as a "black pulpwood worker". In 1986 he had been married to Minnie McMillian for 25 years and they had nine children. McMillian held two jobs and "no criminal record other than a misdemeanor charge stemming [from] a barroom fight". He "did not have a history of violence."

McMillian was known in the small community for having an affair with a white woman, Karen Kelly. In addition, one of his sons had married a white woman. Both McMillian and the attorney he had in 1987, J. L. Chestnut, "contended that Mr. McMillian's relationships alone had made him a suspect." In a prison interview in 1993, McMillian said, "The only reason I'm here is because I had been messing around with a white lady and my son married a white lady."

== Murder of Ronda Morrison ==
Eighteen-year-old Ronda Morrison, a white dry-cleaning clerk, was murdered at Jackson Cleaners on November 1, 1986, in Monroeville, Alabama. She had been shot numerous times from behind. At the time of her murder, Walter McMillian was hosting a church fish fry on his front lawn, where he was seen by dozens of witnesses, one of whom was a police officer.

== Arrest ==
McMillian, who had "no prior felony convictions", was arrested by newly elected Sheriff Tom Tate, who was under pressure to find a suspect. McMillian was arrested in June 1987. In what The New York Times described as "an extraordinary move", McMillian "was immediately sent to Alabama's Death Row, in Holman State Prison, Atmore, which is usually reserved for convicted murderers awaiting execution." He was held there, pre-trial, for 15 months.

McMillian had explained to Sheriff Tate shortly after his arrest that he was at the fish fry on the morning of November 1. Tate replied, "I don't give a damn what you say or what you do. I don't give a damn what your people say either. I'm going to put twelve people on a jury who are going to find your goddamn black ass guilty."

On December 11, 1987, Walter McMillian and Ralph Bernard Myers, a career criminal, were jointly indicted. McMillian was charged with a two-count indictment "for the offense of murder made capital because it was committed during a robbery in the first degree", and the jury recommended a life sentence. Myers pleaded guilty as a conspirator in the murder and received a 30-year prison term.

== Trial and sentencing ==
The trial began on August 15, 1988. Judge Robert E. Lee Key Jr., "had McMillian await trial on death row, as if a death sentence were a foregone conclusion, and relocated the trial from a county that was forty per cent black to an overwhelmingly white one," Baldwin County, where 86 percent of the residents were white, because the case had "generated extraordinary publicity." (Note: According to the 1993 appeal, Judge R.E.L. Key had retired by 1993.) McMillian was represented by attorney J. L. Chestnut.

The trial lasted only a day and a half. On August 17, 1988, the jury of eleven whites and one African American found McMillian "guilty of the capital offense charged in the indictment" and recommended a life sentence, based on the testimony of four state's informants found by the prosecution: Ralph Myers, a career criminal; Bill Hooks Jr.; Joe Hightower; and one other. Two of the witnesses claimed to have seen McMillian's "low-rider" truck outside the dry cleaner's around the time that the crime occurred. (Note: During the 1993 appeal, it was revealed that "[t]wo mechanics, Willie Nettles and Clay Kast, testified that they had modified the appellant's truck to convert it to a low-rider and that they did not do this work until several months after the commission of the crime at Jackson Cleaners.")

The "jury ignored multiple alibi defense witnesses, who were black, who testified under oath that he was at a fish fry at the time of the crime." There was no physical evidence implicating McMillian.

Six years after the original trial, in an unrelated case, the Alabama Court of Criminal Appeals found that the prosecutor, District Attorney Theodore Pearson, and Judge Key "had practiced 'intentional racial discrimination' in jury selection." (Note: According to David Rose in his 1999 article in The Guardian, reporting on the trial of Brian Baldwin, where Theodore Pearson was prosecutor and Key was the judge: "Forty-six per cent of Monroe County's population is black. At the start of Baldwin's trial, there were 11 African Americans on the jury panel. The prosecutor, District Attorney Theodore Pearson, used his power to remove all of them, with the approval of the judge, Robert E. Lee Key.")

=== Sentencing override ===
On September 19, 1988, Judge Robert E. Lee Key Jr. overruled the jury's recommendation of a life sentence and imposed the death penalty. Key remarked that "McMillian deserved to be executed for the brutal killing of a young lady in the first full flower of adulthood." This practice, called judicial override, allows "elected trial judges to override jury verdicts of life and impose death sentences." According to the Equal Justice Initiative of Montgomery, Alabama, "No capital sentencing procedure in the United States has come under more criticism as unreliable, unpredictable, and arbitrary" than the judicial override.

Since then, the frequency of the judicial override in Alabama has come under scrutiny: "Nearly seventy Alabama judges have single-handedly ordered an inmate's execution, and collectively they have done so more than a hundred times. Thirty-six of the nearly two hundred convicts on death row are there because of override."

In November 1988, 28-year-old attorney Bryan Stevenson, a Harvard Law School and Harvard School of Government graduate (as an undergraduate, he attended Eastern University, graduating with a degree in philosophy), who was the director of the newly formed Alabama Capital Representation Resource Center in Montgomery, took on the task of appealing the case. When he visited McMillian in prison, (Note: In 1992 Stevenson founded Equal Justice Initiative (EJI) a nonprofit law center in Montgomery, Alabama.) McMillian maintained his innocence. Stevenson was motivated to take McMillian's case because of the use of the judge override.

After he had decided to take the appeal, he got a phone call from Judge Key discouraging Stevenson from taking the case. In a 2015 NPR interview, Stevenson described how that phone call was a "very, very bizarre start to my career and to the work that I was doing in Alabama." Stevenson then visited McMillian's community and "met dozens of African-Americans who were with this condemned man at the time the crime took place 11 miles away who absolutely knew he was innocent."

== First appeal (1991) ==
From 1990 to 1993, the Alabama Court of Criminal Appeals turned down four appeals. McMillian's conviction and death sentence were affirmed on appeal in 1991 in McMillian v. State, 594 So. 2d 1253 (Ala.Cr. App.1991).

== Petition (1992) ==
Following his own trial and sentencing, Ralph Bernard Myers told McMillian's trial counsel that the testimony he gave "against McMillian was false." Myers confessed that "he knew nothing about the crime, that he was not present when the crime was committed, that he had been told what to say by certain law enforcement officers, and that he had testified falsely against McMillian because of pressure from the officers." McMillian's attorneys from the Equal Justice Initiative filed a petition for a new trial alleging various constitutional violations, including "that a key state witness had recanted his testimony, that the appellant's conviction had been obtained by perjured testimony, and that the evidence of perjury was newly discovered." The petition also alleged that the state of Alabama "had violated his constitutional rights by withholding exculpatory and impeachment information". (Note: In Walter McMillian v. State 1993, the owner of Jackson Cleaners, Miles Jackson "had told the police during their investigation that he had entered Jackson Cleaners at 10:30 a.m. on the day of the murder; that Ronda Morrison, the victim, was alive at that time." This was withheld by D.A. Theodore Pearson.)

In 1992 the Alabama Court of Criminal Appeals in McMillian v. State 594 So. 2d 1289 (Ala.Cr.App.1992) denied the claims by McMillian's attorneys.

== Walter McMillian v. State (February 23, 1993) ==
On February 23, 1993, in Walter McMillian v. State in the Alabama Court of Criminal Appeals, all judges concurred that "the state suppressed exculpatory and impeachment evidence that had been requested by the defense, thus denying the appellant due process of law, requiring the reversal of his conviction and death sentence, and the remand of the case for a new trial." D.A. Pearson had failed to disclose exculpatory evidence to McMillian's attorneys, including records from the Taylor Hardin Secure Medical Facility and Myers' June 3 and August 27 statements.

Further investigation revealed that McMillian's truck, supposedly seen by witnesses at the scene of the crime, had not been converted to a "low-rider" until six months after the crime took place. It also emerged that District Attorney Theodore Pearson "had concealed evidence proving his innocence": a witness had seen the victim alive after the time when prosecutors claimed that McMillian had killed her.

The two witnesses who had testified that they had seen McMillian's truck retracted their testimony, and admitted that they lied at trial, committing perjury.

McMillian's "appellate lawyers discovered that prosecutors had withheld evidence and that the state's star witnesses had lied." It emerged that Sheriff Tate and investigators with the Monroe County D.A.'s office and the Alabama Bureau of Investigation (ABI) had "pressured [Myers] into lying about Mr. McMillian." (Note: In the case Walter McMillian v. State proceedings it was recorded that Myers identified Larry Ikner, and Thomas Tate, as the law enforcement officers.) In pursuing those claims, the attorneys obtained the original recording of Myers' confession. After listening to it, they flipped the tape over and discovered a recorded conversation in which Myers complained bitterly that he was being forced to implicate McMillian, whom he did not know, for a crime neither of them had any role in.

Upon discovery of this evidence, District Attorney Thomas Chapman, who had represented the state in McMillian's previous appeals, told Stevenson, "I want to do everything I can so that your client will not have to spend a single day more than he already has on death row. I feel sick about the six years that [McMillian] has spent in prison and the part I played in keeping him there."

=== Exoneration (March 2, 1993) ===
On February 23, 1993, in his fifth appeal to the Alabama Court of Criminal Appeals, the judges ruled 5–0 to reverse McMillian's conviction and grant him a new trial. McMillian's attorney then filed a motion to dismiss all charges. The following week, on March 2, Circuit Court Judge Pamela W. Baschab ruled on the motion, dismissing all charges against McMillian.

Chapman, who did not prosecute the original case in 1987, "joined the defense in seeking to have the charges" against McMillian dismissed. However, Chapman did not agree that there had been a "deliberate effort to frame Mr. McMillian." He claimed that McMillian's exoneration "proved the system worked." Stevenson disagreed, telling the court that "it was far too easy to convict this wrongly accused man for murder and send him to death row for something he didn't do and much too hard to win his freedom after proving his innocence."

== Civil lawsuit ==
After returning to his family and hometown of Monroeville, McMillian filed a civil lawsuit against state and local officials, including "the three men in charge of investigating the Morrison murder – Tom Tate, the Sheriff of Monroe County; Larry Ikner, an investigator with the District Attorney's office in Monroe County; and Simon Benson, an investigator with the Alabama Bureau of Investigation", for his wrongful prosecution and conviction. It was appealed to the United States Supreme Court, which ruled against McMillian, holding that a county sheriff could not be sued for monetary damages. Subsequently, McMillian settled out of court with other officials for an undisclosed amount. McMillian's case served as a catalyst for Alabama's compensation statute, which was passed in 2001. (Note: "Exoneree Compensation: In order to be eligible to receive compensation for wrongful incarceration a person must: (1) Have been convicted by the state of one or more felony offenses, all of which the person was innocent, and have served time in prison as a result of the conviction or convictions; or (2) have been incarcerated pretrial on a state felony charge, for at least two years through no fault of his or her own, before having charges dismissed based on innocence. Minimum of $50,000 for each year of incarceration, Committee on Compensation for Wrongful Incarceration can recommend discretionary amount in addition to base, but legislature must appropriate any funds. Effective: 2001." Innocence Project)

== Life after ==
McMillian later developed dementia, believed to have been brought on by the trauma of imprisonment. He died on September 11, 2013.

== Media coverage ==
=== News ===
In the fall of 1992, McMillian's case received national attention in the CBS News program 60 Minutes. It was pointed out that Monroeville, Alabama, was "best known as the home of Harper Lee, whose To Kill a Mockingbird told a painful story of race and justice in the small-town Jim Crow South."

=== Books and film ===
The story was featured in a 1995 book entitled Circumstantial Evidence: Death, Life, and Justice in a Southern Town by former Washington Post journalist Pete Earley.

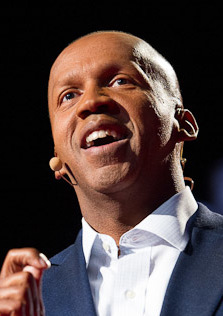
Stevenson in 2012

The 2019 film Just Mercy dramatizes McMillian's case, and stars Jamie Foxx as McMillian and Michael B. Jordan as Bryan Stevenson, with direction by Destin Daniel Cretton, based on Stevenson's 2014 book Just Mercy: A Story of Justice and Redemption.

== See also ==
- Criminal procedure
- List of death row inmates in the United States
- List of wrongful convictions in the United States
