= Monroeville, Alabama =

City in Alabama, United States

- City
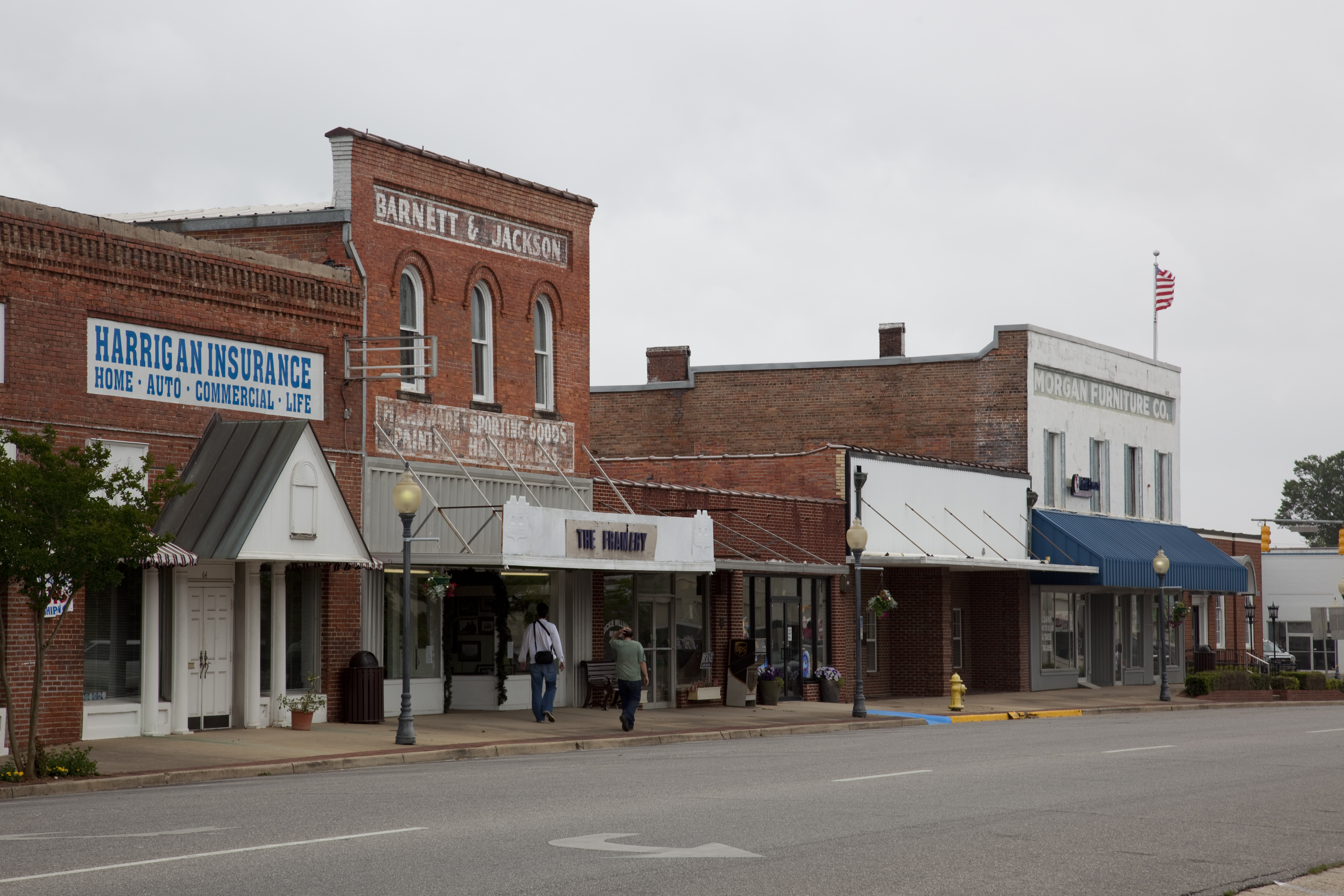
- Historic buildings in Downtown Monroeville

- Flag Seal
- Nickname: The Literary Capital of Alabama
- Motto: "Moving the Past Forward"
- Location of Monroeville in Monroe County, Alabama.
- Coordinates: 31°30′15″N 87°19′33″W
- Country: United States
- State: Alabama
- County: Monroe

Area
  - Total: 13.36 sq mi (34.61 km^{2})
  - Land: 13.36 sq mi (34.59 km^{2})
  - Water: 0.0077 sq mi (0.02 km^{2})
- Elevation: 420 ft (130 m)

Population (2020)
  - Total: 5,951
  - Density: 445.6/sq mi (172.06/km^{2})
- Time zone: UTC-6 (Central (CST))
  - Summer (DST): UTC-5 (CDT)
- ZIP codes: 36460–36462
- Area codes: 251
- FIPS code: 01-50192
- GNIS feature ID: 2404285
- Website: www.monroevilleal.gov

Monroeville is the county seat of Monroe County, Alabama, United States. At the 2020 census its population was 5,951.

== History ==
Occupied for thousands of years by indigenous peoples, this area was ceded by the historic tribe to the U.S. government in the 1830s and the era of Indian Removal.

The town was first known as Walker's Mill and Store, named for Major Walker, the area's first European-American settler. In 1832, the legislature relocated the county seat to Monroeville from Claiborne on the Alabama River. The settlement was briefly renamed "Centerville" due to its location in the center of the county, and then was formally changed to Monroeville. The town was not formally incorporated until April 15, 1899.

== Geography ==
According to the U.S. Census Bureau, the city has a total area of 13.4 square miles (34.7 km^{2}), of which 13.4 square miles (34.6 km^{2}) is land and 0.0077 square miles (0.02 km^{2}), or 0.05%, is water.

Almost all of the urban area lies on Bama fine sandy loam. Less developed areas around town are mostly on Saffell gravelly sandy loam or Flomaton gravelly loamy sand.

== Demographics ==
Historical population
Census	Pop.	Note	%±
1880	122		—
1900	422		—
1910	616		46.0%
1920	1,017		65.1%
1930	1,355		33.2%
1940	1,724		27.2%
1950	2,772		60.8%
1960	3,632		31.0%
1970	4,846		33.4%
1980	5,674		17.1%
1990	6,993		23.2%
2000	6,862		−1.9%
2010	6,519		−5.0%
2020	5,951		−8.7%
U.S. Decennial Census; 2013 Estimate

=== Racial and ethnic composition ===
Monroeville city, Alabama – Racial composition Note: the US Census treats Hispanic/Latino as an ethnic category. This table excludes Latinos from the racial categories and assigns them to a separate category. Hispanics/Latinos may be of any race.
Race (NH = Non-Hispanic)	% 2020	% 2010	% 2000	Pop 2020	Pop 2010	Pop 2000
White alone (NH)	36.1%	41.8%	52.9%	2,146	2,726	3,628
Black alone (NH)	59.3%	55.6%	44.4%	3,530	3,623	3,049
American Indian alone (NH)	0.4%	0.3%	0.4%	25	21	26
Asian alone (NH)	0.8%	0.3%	0.6%	46	19	39
Pacific Islander alone (NH)	0%	0%	0%	0	0	0
Other race alone (NH)	0.3%	0.1%	0%	17	5	2
Multiracial (NH)	2.1%	1.1%	0.8%	125	74	56
Hispanic/Latino (any race)	1%	0.8%	0.9%	62	51	62

=== 2020 census ===
As of the 2020 census, Monroeville had a population of 5,951. The median age was 41.5 years. 22.7% of residents were under the age of 18 and 20.7% of residents were 65 years of age or older. For every 100 females there were 83.3 males, and for every 100 females age 18 and over there were 76.9 males age 18 and over.

72.0% of residents lived in urban areas, while 28.0% lived in rural areas.

As of the 2020 census, there were 2,527 households in Monroeville, of which 30.6% had children under the age of 18 living in them. Of all households, 34.1% were married-couple households, 17.2% were households with a male householder and no spouse or partner present, and 43.9% were households with a female householder and no spouse or partner present. About 34.6% of all households were made up of individuals and 15.6% had someone living alone who was 65 years of age or older.

There were 3,002 housing units, of which 15.8% were vacant. The homeowner vacancy rate was 3.2% and the rental vacancy rate was 8.2%.

As of the 2020 census, there were 1,259 families residing in the city. The most reported ancestries were African American (37.7%), English (10.7%), Irish (4%), German (2%), and Scottish (1.1%).

=== 2010 census ===
At the 2010 census there were 6,519 people, 2,656 households, and 1,723 families living in the city. The population density was 488 inhabitants per square mile (188/km^{2}). There were 3,056 housing units at an average density of 228.1 per square mile (88.1/km^{2}). The racial makeup of the city was 55.7% White, 42.1% Black or African American, 0.3% Native American, 0.3% Asian, 0.3% from other races, and 1.2% from two or more races. 0.8% of the population were Hispanic or Latino of any race. Of the 2,656 households 28.4% had children under the age of 18 living with them, 39.8% were married couples living together, 21.1% had a female householder with no husband present, and 35.1% were non-families. 30.5% of households were one person and 12.9% were one person aged 65 or older. The average household size was 2.37 and the average family size was 2.95.

The age distribution was 24.6% under the age of 18, 9.4% from 18 to 24, 21.8% from 25 to 44, 26.2% from 45 to 64, and 18.0% 65 or older. The median age was 40.2 years. For every 100 females, there were 87.7 males. For every 100 females age 18 and over, there were 88.5 males.

The median household income was $31,593 and the median family income was $49,548. Males had a median income of $41,324 versus $31,033 for females. The per capita income for the city was $20,553. About 23.3% of families and 27.7% of the population were below the poverty line, including 37.3% of those under age 18 and 19.0% of those age 65 or over today.

=== 2000 census ===
At the 2000 census there were 6,862 people, 2,687 households, and 1,870 families living in the city. The population density was 525.8 inhabitants per square mile (203.0/km^{2}). There were 3,016 housing units at an average density of 231.1 per square mile (89.2/km^{2}). The racial makeup of the city was 53.09% White, 44.84% Black or African American, 0.38% Native American, 0.58% Asian, 0.15% from other races, and 0.96% from two or more races. 0.90% of the population were Hispanic or Latino of any race. Of the 2,687 households 34.3% had children under the age of 18 living with them, 48.0% were married couples living together, 18.9% had a female householder with no husband present, and 30.4% were non-families. 28.0% of households were one person and 11.7% were one person aged 65 or older. The average household size was 2.46 and the average family size was 3.04.

The age distribution was 27.7% under the age of 18, 8.9% from 18 to 24, 24.6% from 25 to 44, 22.2% from 45 to 64, and 16.6% 65 or older. The median age was 36 years. For every 100 females, there were 82.0 males. For every 100 females age 18 and over, there were 76.4 males.

The median household income was $28,229 and the median family income was $36,476. Males had a median income of $35,600 versus $20,184 for females. The per capita income for the city was $17,070. About 20.4% of families and 23.0% of the population were below the poverty line, including 29.0% of those under age 18 and 19.2% of those age 65 or over.

== Education ==
Monroeville was formerly home of Alabama Southern Community College, which has been consolidated with the former Jefferson Davis Community College in Brewton and Faulkner Community College headquartered in Bay Minette, Alabama. It is no longer the administrative center, but now has a branch campus of Coastal Alabama Community College, a state-supported, fully accredited, comprehensive two-year college serving southwest Alabama. Its main campus and administrative offices are in Bay Minette.

There is one school district in the county: Monroe County School District.

== Arts and culture ==
=== Literary fame ===
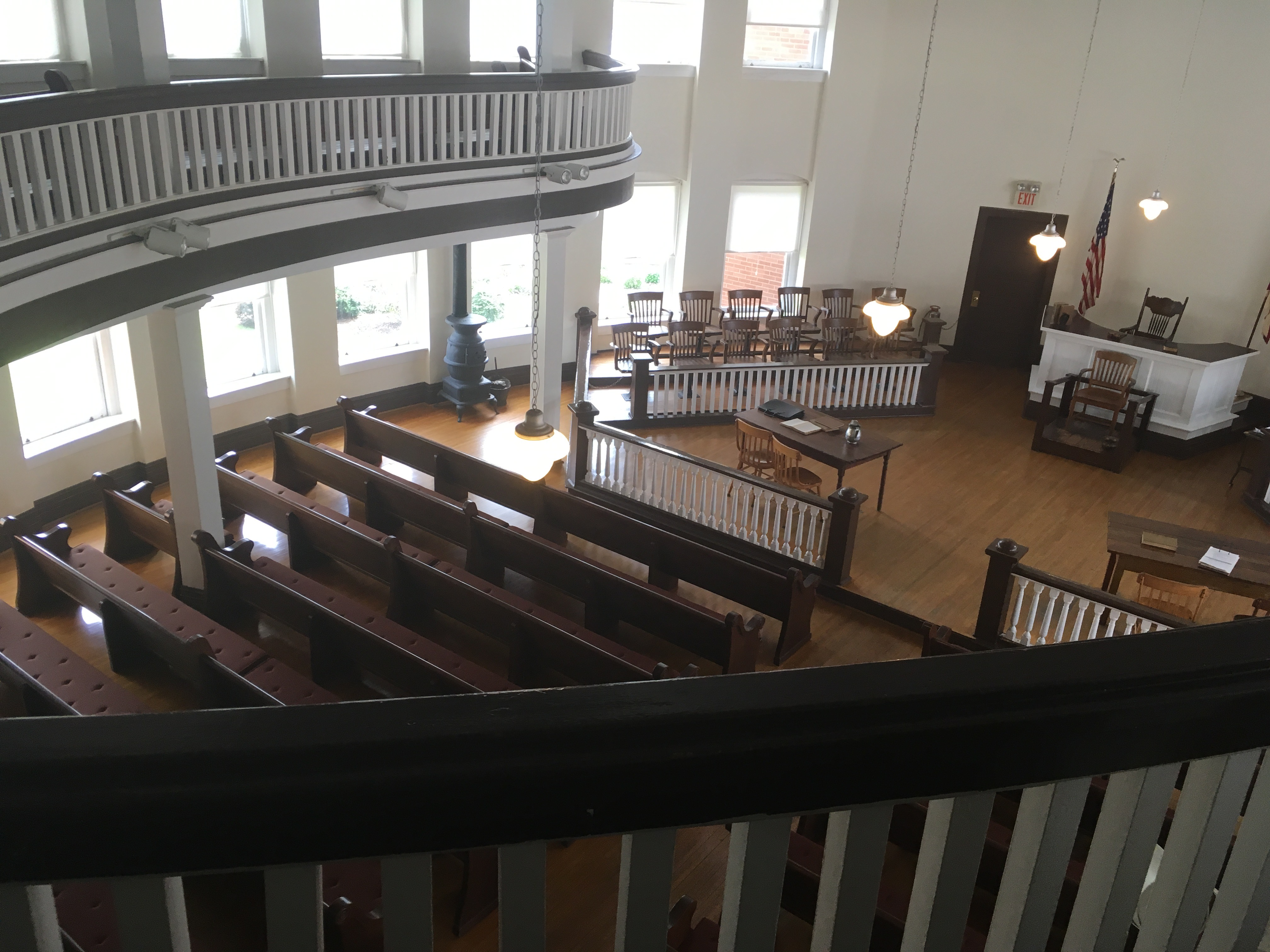
Old Monroe County Courthouse, the model for the courthouse used in the 1962 film To Kill a Mockingbird

Author Harper Lee was born and raised in Monroeville. Her 1960 novel To Kill a Mockingbird, which received the 1961 Pulitzer Prize for Fiction, explored the fictional town of Maycomb, inspired by her hometown. Her other novel, Go Set a Watchman, is also set in Maycomb. Truman Capote, best known for his novella Breakfast at Tiffany's and his non-fiction novel In Cold Blood, spent part of his childhood in Monroeville. Lee and Capote were neighbors and remained close friends into adulthood. Capote's early novels, including Other Voices, Other Rooms and The Grass Harp, draw heavily on his childhood in Monroeville. Capote has acknowledged being the inspiration for the character of Dill in To Kill a Mockingbird, while Lee in turn was the inspiration for the character of Idabel in Other Voices, Other Rooms.

Novelist Mark Childress and Cynthia Tucker, syndicated columnist and winner of the 2007 Pulitzer Prize for Commentary, were also born in Monroeville.

Monroeville also features in NYTimes best-selling book, Just Mercy, by Bryan Stevenson. Stevenson points out the irony of Walter McMillian being wrongfully convicted of murder in Monroeville, Harper Lee's hometown.

=== Annual cultural events ===
As of 2006, an estimated 30,000 tourists visited Monroeville annually due to its association with the novel and adaptations of To Kill a Mockingbird. Each May, the Monroe County Heritage Museum stages an amateur play based on the book on the grounds of the courthouse. The interior of the courthouse was used as a reference for the film version of the book. It is the venue for the later amateur productions. The all-volunteer cast has been invited to perform in Washington, D.C., Kingston upon Hull and Jerusalem. In 1997, the Alabama Legislature designated Monroeville and Monroe County the "Literary Capital of Alabama".

=== Television ===
In the television show Private Practice, created and produced by Shonda Rhimes, the fictional character Charlotte King was born in Monroeville.

== Notable people ==
- Marsha Barbour, first lady of the State of Mississippi from 2004 to 2012
- Chris Booker, Major League Baseball player
- Truman Capote, author
- Mark Childress, novelist
- Amasa Coleman Lee, lawyer and legislator
- Marva Collins, educator
- Tytus Howard, tackle for the Houston Texans
- Harper Lee, author of To Kill a Mockingbird and Go Set a Watchman
- John McDuffie, former U.S. Congressman from the 1st District of Alabama and former Majority Whip
- Walter McMillian, exonerated and freed in 1993 after being sentenced to death in a wrongful conviction
- Allison Moorer, folk singer
- Fannie E. Motley, first African-American student to graduate from Spring Hill College
- Marie Rudisill, author and television personality
- Bill Selby, former utility player with the Boston Red Sox, Cincinnati Reds, and Cleveland Indians
- Cynthia Tucker, syndicated columnist who won the 2007 Pulitzer Prize for Commentary

== Bibliography ==
- Shields, Charles. Mockingbird: A Portrait of Harper Lee. Henry Holt and Co.: 2006. ISBN 0-8050-7919-X
