= Killing of Alonzo Tucker =

1902 lynching in Coos Bay, Oregon, United States

- Date: September 18, 1902; 123 years ago
- Type: Murder

Alonzo Tucker was an African American boxer and owned a gym in Coos Bay, Oregon. He was accused by Mrs. Dennis of rape. Alonzo Tucker was then shot by two unidentified 12-year-old boys. Tucker succumbed to his injuries; the mob chasing him took his corpse and hanged it from the 7th Street Bridge. Dennis and her family quickly left town and headed to California.

== Biography ==
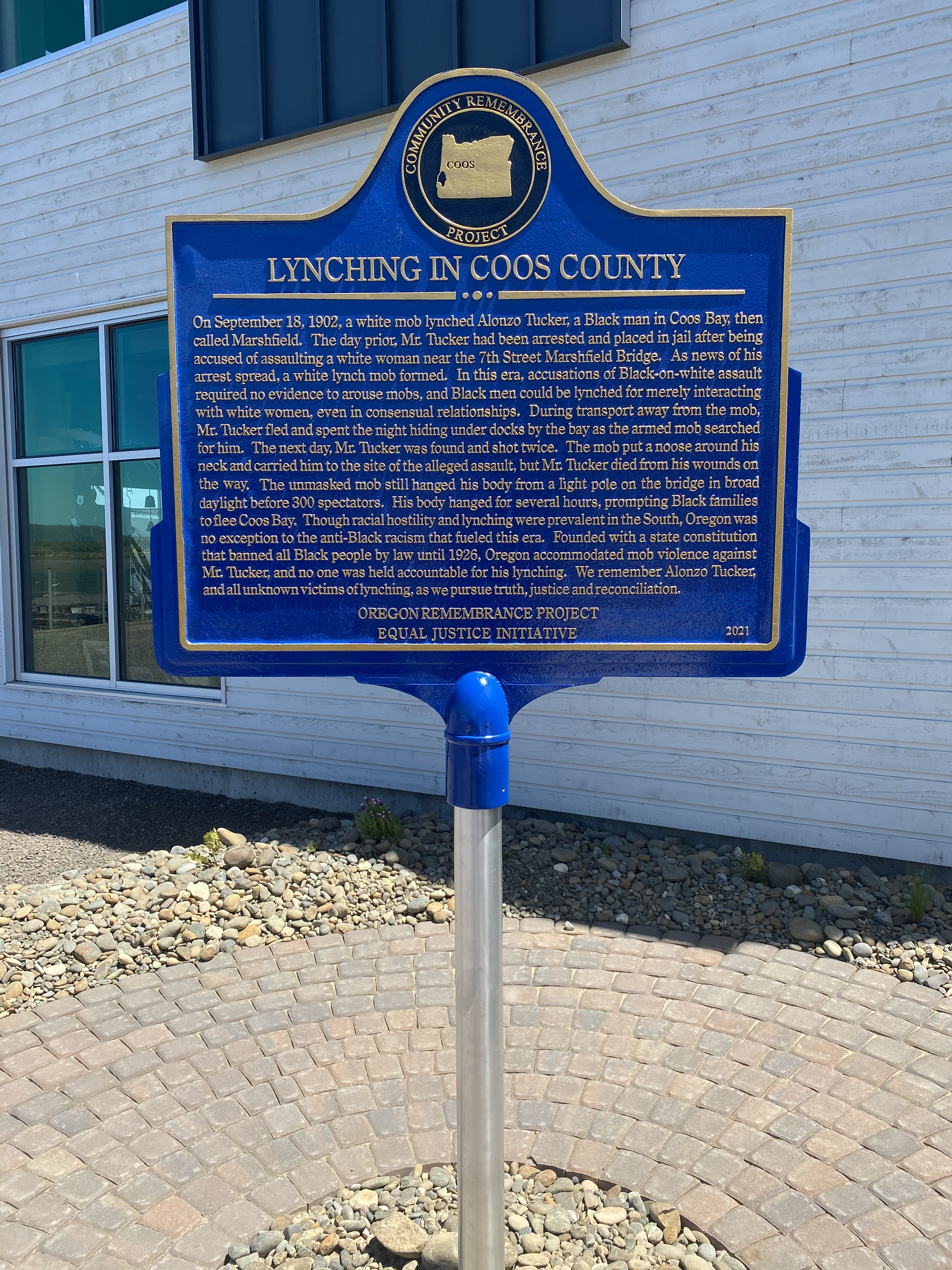
Alonzo Tucker historical marker, placed in Coos Bay, Oregon on June 23, 2021.

Alonzo Tucker was a bootblack (shoeshiner) in a barbershop, a boxer, and he owned a gym in Coos Bay, Oregon. The 1900 census listed 36 Black people living in Coos County.

On September 18, 1902, he was accused of raping a white woman and escaping from jail. According to newspaper accounts, Tucker was discovered by two young boys who began shooting at him with rifles. After a brief pursuit, local miners apprehended Tucker, who was hiding inside a store. By then Tucker had succombed to his injuries. The mob considered hanging him inside the store but decided to return him to the site of the alleged rape at a nearby bridge. Tucker's body was shot twice more and then hung from the 7th Street bridge, which spanned what is now Golden Field, a high school soccer field.

No charges were ever brought against the mob as officials determined "the deceased came to his death at the hands of parties unknown while resisting arrest for a felony, and that no crime was committed thereby." Despite the claim that those in the mob were unknown, the participation of multiple people, including the husband of the alleged rape victim, was noted in local newspapers. One newspaper at that time reported the mob was "quiet and orderly," and another paper wrote, "'Well done' is the consensus of public opinion." Tucker's cause of death was exsanguination, blood loss from gunshot wounds. According to the coroner's report, cause of death was blood loss from the gunshot wound in Tucker's right thigh, in which case he died before being hanged on the Marshfield bridge.

== Eyewitness accounts ==
In 1974, Coos Bay World interviewed three elderly men who had witnessed the killing as children. One of the men, Martin Steckel, recalled, "I was not over 20 feet from Tucker when they shot him. I was about seven years old. They accused him of assaulting a woman. But I don't believe he ever did." The men said that Tucker ran every morning for exercise and that he would meet a woman near the old cemetery. The men said that the local doctor caught the two lovers when riding past on his horse and buggy, "And she saw she was caught, so to clear her skirts, she claimed he attacked her." The last words Steckel heard Tucker say were, "Lord have mercy on a colored man."

== Memorial ==
In 2020, the Oregon Remembrance Project, Equal Justice Initiative, and the Coos History Museum held an event to honor Alonzo Tucker. The Coos History Museum partnered with the Oregon Remembrance Project to gather jars of soil from important locations related to the Alonzo Tucker lynching, placing them on display in the museum. A historical marker was placed in June 2021, commemorating Tucker.
