= Resilience: Two Sisters and a Story of Mental Illness =

Memoir written by Jessie Close with Glenn Close and Pete Earley

Resilience: Two Sisters and a Story of Mental Illness is a memoir written by Jessie Close with Pete Earley, including some contributions from her sister, actress Glenn Close. This book deals with Jessie Close's mental health issues. The book discusses mental illness, abandonment, sexuality, substance abuse, and emotional turmoil.

== Summary ==
Jessie was the youngest of four children to a nurse and a physician. When Jessie was little, her parents joined the Moral Re-Armament (MRA). Her parents became missionaries for the movement, leaving the children with an MRA nanny. This is where Jessie's feelings of abandonment began.

The Close family moved to Switzerland, the MRA base . While her two older sisters became MRA members, Jessie rebelled. During this time, the children were constantly guilted for having impure thoughts and forced to repent for their daily sins. Eventually, the Close Parents were stationed in Africa Jessie spent some time there but after an altercation with a boy selling newspapers, she decided to move back to the United States.

As a teenager, she lived in Los Angeles, and got into heavy drinking and substance abuse. She stopped going to class and rebelled against her family. She married a man named Brad and began hosting an illegal radio station in United States. Both Jessie and Brad were substance abusers and Brad committed domestic abuse on her. A few years later, Jessie's mom and Glen moved Jessie away from Brad to their home in Wyoming.

In Wyoming, Jessie continued abusing drugs and alcohol. After partying, she would slip into a depressive episode, the lingering of what she would later discover was her bipolar disorder. She married five times throughout her life, each marriage ending due to her mood swings, or her actions during her manic episodes. Jessie attempted to commit suicide three time during her life. She started hallucinating and dissociating. She had two children with her third husband, Tom: Calen and Sander. She also had another child, Mattie, with a different man.

In high school, Calen was diagnosed with schizoaffective disorder and was hospitalized. With medication, Calen improved and was discharged. Meanwhile, Jessie was experiencing intense mood swings. After being hospitalized, she was diagnosed with Bipolar 1 Disorder with psychotic features. She was placed on medication, and her suicidal ideation lessened. She finally began improving.

== Critical reception ==
The book was reviewed by Kirkus, Publishers Weekly, and USA Today. Kirkus describes it as a "harrowing ride" of "courageous personal reflections" despite a "slow start". Publishers Weekly called it "heartfelt" but "belabored and grim." USA Today identifies the writing as clumsy at points, but describes Jessie's life as "spellbinding."
