= Fannie E. Motley =

Fannie Motley
- Born: Fannie Ernestine Smith; January 25, 1927; Perdue Hill, Alabama
- Died: May 8, 2016 (aged 89); Fairburn, Georgia
- Resting place: Vine Street Hill Cemetery Cincinnati, Ohio
- Other name: Fannie Ernestine Smith Motley
- Education: Selma University; Spring Hill College; Xavier University
- Occupation: Educator
- Known for: First African-American graduate of Spring Hill College
- Spouse: D.L. Motley
- Children: 2

Fannie Ernestine Smith Motley (January 25, 1927 – May 8, 2016) was the first African-American graduate from Spring Hill College, a Jesuit institution in Mobile, Alabama. She entered the school in 1954.

== Biography ==
Fannie Smith was born on January 25, 1927. Her father was Nelson H. Smith Sr., a Baptist minister, and her mother was Lillie A. Little Smith. Her place of birth was Perdue Hill, Alabama, a rural area outside Monroeville.

Fannie Smith was raised in Monroeville. In 1944, Smith enrolled at Selma University, a historically Black college located in Selma, Alabama, and she studied there to 1946. During this time, she met D.L. Motley, a ministerial student. They married on June 1, 1949. Subsequently, she gave birth to two sons, which interrupted her college education. In 1952 upon news of the impending desegration of Spring Hill College, the Jesuit school in Mobile, Alabama, D.L. accepted the pastorate of Yorktown Baptist Church in Africatown, three miles north of downtown Mobile.

Motley was afraid for her family's safety if she applied to Spring Hill College due to the area's active Ku Klux Klan. Her husband wanted her to complete her degree and encouraged her to apply. Motley insisted that she should wait for an opportunity to attend the all-Black Alabama State College in Montgomery. After the Spring Hill College president Father Andrew Smith told her not to worry about the Klan and he would take care of it, she ultimately in December 1954 submitted an application.

Shortly after the 1954 Brown vs. Board of Education decision, Motley was accepted, and she enrolled in Spring Hill College.

Years before George Wallace attempted to block integration of the University of Alabama, Motley became the first Black student to graduate from Spring Hill College. On May 29, 1956, Motley graduated with honors and became the first African-American student to graduate from a previously all-white college in the state of Alabama. The moment was documented in The New York Times, Jet and Time.

Motley came to Cincinnati in 1963 when her husband was pastor of Peace Baptist Church. She taught for 24 years in the Cincinnati Public School system. In 1969 she earned a master's degree in guidance counseling from Xavier University.

She has a chair in her living room with a sign on it that says, "Martin Luther King Jr. sat in this chair at our house, October 10, 1964."

The Fannie Motley Scholarship was established in 1995 to honor her legacy at Spring Hill College.

On May 9, 2004, Spring Hill College conferred on Motley an honorary doctorate of humanities.

== Family ==
Her husband was D. L. Motley Sr., a pastor. She has two sons who are pastors in Jeffersonville, Indiana, and Atlanta, Georgia.

When her husband died in 2001 she moved to Jeffersonville, Indiana. Motley died in Fairburn, Georgia, on Mother's Day 2016 and was interred at Vine Street Hill Cemetery in Cincinnati. Mrs. Motley's brother was minister and civil rights activist, the Rev. Nelson "Fireball" Smith.
