= Michael L. Radelet =

American sociologist

- Born: October 24, 1950 (age 75)
- Education: Michigan State University; Eastern Michigan University; Purdue University
- Scientific career
- Fields: Sociology
- Workplaces: University of Colorado Boulder
- Thesis: Social factors influencing medicalization of anxiety: a study of tranquilizer use (1977)

Michael L. Radelet (born October 24, 1950) is a sociologist at the University of Colorado Boulder. He currently holds the appointment of professor emeritus, after previously chairing the Department of Sociology at the university.

In his research, Radelet focuses on his interests in criminology, deviance, capital punishment, societal reaction to crime, racial disparities in death sentencing and crime victims. Radelet has taught courses covering introductory sociology, criminology for both undergraduate and graduate levels, capital punishment for both undergraduate and graduate levels, sociology of mental health and illness for both undergraduate and graduate levels, graduate seminar on health professions, social and ethical issues in medical practice, human development, statistics, and social problems. He is the author of the book Facing the Death Penalty that was published in 1989, in which he describes the realities of capital punishment to those condemned.

== Career ==
Radelet has been a professor at many universities and has taught in many fields of study throughout his career. Before his work at University of Colorado Boulder, Radelet worked as a professor and the chair of the department of sociology at the University of Florida, where many of his works originated. He has taught all over the U.S. in places like the University of Florida, Florida State, University of Colorado, Indiana University, Eastern Michigan University and Wisconsin University. Radelet has lectured and taught: Mental Health Administration, Sociology of Mental Health and Illnesses, Criminology, Special Topics on Capital Punishment, and Human Development.

== Research and findings ==
Radelet throughout his career has studied the impact that the death penalty has on the mind, and on society. In the midst of the ongoing debate on whether or not the death penalty is more deterrent than long-term imprisonment, Radelet's studies revealed findings that could alter the system. His works surveyed many, coming up with multiple conclusions regarding the issue. These results are described in his article 'Do Executions Lower Homicide Rates: The Views of Leading Criminologists.' One of the main statistics projected in this article states that 88% of criminologists do not believe that capital punishment is an effective deterrent to homicide. Radelet's knowledge in Psychology and Criminology helped him produce his book "Facing the Death Penalty." This book portrays what Michael experienced while working with those who are facing the death penalty. It talks a lot about the benefits and inhumanities of the death penalty and how Radelet's experience may change people's views.

=== Racial disparities ===
Radelet has uncovered many facts and statistics relating to the problem of racial disparities in the federal death penalty. He has statistics dating back to 1991 during the first federal death penalty prosecution. In the history of those who were prosecuted and sentenced to the death penalty, most were of color. These injustices continue today, more and more whites are able to evade the death penalty better than blacks.

These injustices revealed by Radelet made the notion that racism is in the justice system apparent. These studies triggered an uprising of debate on whether the death penalty is a fair punishment.
