= Pete Earley =

American journalist and writer

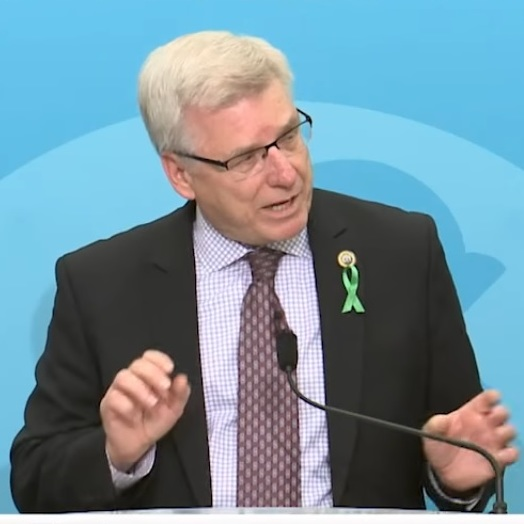
- Earley in May 2016
- Born: September 5, 1951 (age 75); Douglas, Arizona, U.S.
- Occupations: Journalist, writer
- Website: peteearley.com

Pete Earley (born September 5, 1951) is an American journalist and author who has written non-fiction books and novels.

== Career ==
Born in Douglas, Arizona, Earley became a Washington Post reporter and also wrote books about the Aldrich Ames and John Walker espionage cases. His book Circumstantial Evidence: Death, Life, and Justice in a Southern Town (1995), about the wrongful conviction of Walter McMillian in Alabama, won an Edgar Award from the Mystery Writers of America for Best Fact Crime Book in 1996 and a Robert F. Kennedy Human Rights Book Award.

His book about the John Walker spy ring, Family of Spies, was a New York Times bestseller. It was adapted as a CBS miniseries starring Powers Boothe and Lesley Ann Warren. In 2007, Earley was a finalist for a Pulitzer Prize for his book Crazy: A Father's Search Through America's Mental Health Madness, about a man seeking help for his son.

His 2008 book, Comrade J, is about Russian SVR defector Sergei Tretyakov. His most recent book, No Human Contact: Solitary Confinement, Maximum Security and Two Inmates Who Changed The System, describes Earley's 33-year relationship with Thomas Silverstein, who was held under the harshest conditions allowed by law, after he murdered a prison guard.

== Family ==
Earley was a third child. His oldest sibling, George Earley, was a history professor and administrator at Black Hills State University in Spearfish, South Dakota, before retiring. Pete's older sister, Alice Lee Earley, died at the age of 17 on June 14, 1966, after being hit by a car while riding Pete's scooter. (Pete was 14 years old and at church camp when his sister was killed.) Years later, in a 1985 Washington Post article called "To Find a Sister" (1985), Earley wrote about Alice's death and its effect on his life. (As part of it, he interviewed the woman driver who had hit his sister.)

Earley graduated from Fowler (Co.) high school in 1969 and attended Phillips University, Enid, Oklahoma, where he met and married Barbara Ann Hunter, a fellow student. They were divorced in 1996 and the parents of three children. In 1998, he married Patti Brown Luzi, an elementary school reading specialist with four children. Her first husband, Steven Francis Luzi, died from cancer in 1994. Earley later adopted her four children.

On March 1, 2024, Earley announced on his author's blog that he had been diagnosed with stage four lung cancer and was retiring from writing.

== Writing career ==
Earley served as an editor of his high school and college newspapers. After graduating from college in 1973, he was hired by William Lindsey White at the Emporia Gazette in Emporia, Kansas. In 1975, he joined The Tulsa Tribune in Tulsa, Oklahoma, becoming its Washington D.C. correspondent in 1978. He was hired by The Washington Post in 1980 where he was assigned to what was called the "Holy Shit Squad" by Executive Editor Ben Bradlee who encouraged a small team of writers to make readers exclaim that expletive when reading their morning paper. After the Janet Cooke Pulitzer Prize scandal rocked the paper, the team was disbanded and Earley was promoted first to the paper's national staff and then its Sunday magazine.

Earley's profile of Arthur Walker published in the Sunday magazine on September 14, 1985, led to him interviewing and obtaining exclusive cooperation from Arthur, John Walker Jr. Michael Walker, and Jerry Whitworth, the four members of the Walker Spy Ring for his first book in 1988. The New York Times reported that Earley had obtained their cooperation in return for a percentage of any book royalties. At the time, there were no laws that banned spies from "check book" journalism. Earley acknowledged his arrangement in his book, but noted that he'd maintained full editorial control. Earley's book was well received. The Washington Post bought first serial rights. New York Times Book Reviewer Lucinda Franks wrote: "What distinguishes 'Family of Spies' is that Pete Earley, a former reporter for The Washington Post, uses Mr. Walker's words not to try to understand him but to expose his superficially slick but profoundly distorted mind. The result is an unusually penetrating portrait of the banality of evil, or a psychology that usually defines intimate understanding – the narcissist whose rationalization make his wrongdoing seem almost normal." Publishers Weekly noted Earley "constructed a masterful psychological portrait of a man seemingly without a soul. A Family of Spies is a classic of the genre."

In 1987, Earley was permitted unrestricted access to the U.S. Penitentiary in Leavenworth, Kansas, to observe everyday events as a reporter for his book, The Hot House: Life in Leavenworth Prison. He spent two years at the maximum security penitentiary. Los Angeles Times Book Reviewer Charles Bowden wrote: "Before we had schools of journalism, there was a straightforward task called reporting that took you where you had not been and told you what you had not know. This book is by a reporter, and gives the reader reporting at its very finest." Kirkus Reviews described the book as a "fascinating white-knuckle tour of hell, brilliantly reported". But then Federal Bureau of Prisons Director Michael J. Quinlan, who had green lighted Earley's project, later complained that his book was too "sensational".

In 1994, Earley met with Aldrich Hazen Ames for eleven days inside the Alexandria County jail without the knowledge of the CIA or FBI because of a bureaucratic blunder. Ames wrote an introductory letter for Earley who met with the SVR/KGB in Moscow. A copy of Ames' letter was reprinted in Earley's book along with a series of personal letters from Ames explaining his motivations and self-justification.

With publication of CRAZY: A Father's Search Through America's Mental Health Madness, Earley became a nationally recognized advocate for improved mental health services. He appeared on CNN with Anderson Cooper after the shootings on the Virginia Tech campus on April 16, 2007. He served on a governor-appointed commission which recommended changes in Virginia's mental health laws. He was the first to report about the death of Natasha McKenna in the Fairfax County Detention Center after she was repeatedly shot with a taser. The Washington Post editorial board credited him on 02/12/2015 in an editorial entitled: "A Death in the Fairfax jail renews questions about transparency" with alerting the public about McKenna and Earley was asked by the NAACP to speak at a protest rally about McKenna's treatment. CNN identified Earley as one of nine "mental health warriors" in 2015 describing him as a "one-man watchdog of the mental health community and the politics surrounding efforts to reform the nation's mental health system." He testified before Congress after the Sandy Hook School Shootings. U.S. Senators Chris Murphy (D. Conn.) and Bill Cassidy (R. La.) credited Earley's book for bringing them together to help pass the mental health portions of the 21st Century Cures Act. Earley was appointed as the first parent member of the federal Interdepartmental Serious Mental Illness Coordinating Committee in 2017, which advised Congress about mental health issues. His book received numerous awards from mental health organizations.

Although Earley was a registered Democrat, he collaborated with former House speaker Newt Gingrich on five non-partisan novels.

== Controversies ==
Earley said he resigned from The Washington Post in 1986 after Bob Woodward objected to Earley's payments to the Walker spy family. Earley told the New York Post Page Six that Woodward posed as a friend before quietly urging management to fire him. "Bob Woodward betrayed me and did it in the cruelest possible way." In 2004, Earley published The Big Secret, which The Washington Post described in a critical book review published June 14, 2004, as a "roman a clef" aimed at Woodward. Washington Post book reviewer Patrick Anderson called the murder mystery a "grudge report", writing, "I don't care what may have happened between the two men 18 years ago, but when I pick up a novel I hope to enter the realm of the imagination, and I don't like being constantly distracted by ancient newsroom gossip."

Florida Governor Rick Scott approved the execution of serial killer, David Alan Gore, in 2012 after Gore bragged in Earley's book, The Serial Killer Whisperer, about raping and murdering women. "Pete Earley provides compelling evidence that David Gore relishes every detail of his heinous murders," wrote Ralph Sexton, whose nephew was married to one of the woman slain. Earley published a letter from Gore where Gore wrote: It's sort of along the lines as being horny. you start getting horny and it just keeps building until you have to get some relief. That is the same with the urge to kill. It usually starts out slow and builds and you will take whatever chances necessary to satisfy it. And believe me, you constantly think about getting caught, but the rush is worth the risk."

== Bibliography ==
=== Non-fiction ===
- Family of Spies: Inside the John Walker Spy Ring, Bantam (October 1, 1988), ISBN 978-0-5530-5283-1
- Prophet of Death: The Mormon Blood Atonement Killings, William Morrow & Co (October 1991), ISBN 978-0-6881-0584-6
- The Hot House: Life Inside Leavenworth Prison, Bantam (February 1, 1992), ISBN 978-0-5530-7573-1
- Circumstantial Evidence: Death, Life, and Justice in a Southern Town, Bantam (August 1, 1995), ISBN 978-0-5530-9501-2
- Confessions of A Spy: The Real Story of Aldrich Ames, Putnam (February 10, 1997), ISBN 978-0-3991-4188-1
- Super Casino: Inside the "New" Las Vegas, Bantam (January 4, 2000), ISBN 978-0-5530-9502-9
- WITSEC: Inside The Federal Witness Protection Program, Bantam (January 29, 2002), ISBN 978-0-5538-0145-3
- Crazy: A Father's Search Through America's Mental Health Madness, Berkley (April 3, 2007), ISBN 0-425-21389-7
- Comrade J: The Untold Secrets of Russia's Master Spy in America After the End of the Cold War, Putnam (January 24, 2008), ISBN 978-0-399-15439-3
- The Serial Killer Whisperer: How One Man's Tragedy Helped Unlock the Deadliest Secrets of the World's Most Terrifying Killers, Touchstone (January 10, 2012), ISBN 978-1-4391-9902-2
- Resilience: Two Sisters and a Story of Mental Illness by Jessie Close and Pete Earley, Grand Central Publishing, (January 13, 2015), ISBN 978-1-4555-3022-9

=== Fiction ===
- The Big Secret, Forge Books (June 1, 2004), ISBN 978-0-7653-0783-5
- Lethal Secrets, Forge Books (June 1, 2005), ISBN 978-0-7653-0784-2
- The Apocalypse Stone, Forge Books (June 13, 2006), ISBN 978-0-7653-1025-5
- Duplicity: A Novel, Center Street Press (October 2015), co-author Newt Gingrich ISBN 978-1-4555-3042-7
- Treason: A Novel, Center Street Press (October 2016), co-author Newt Gingrich ISBN 978-1455530441
- Vengeance: A Novel, Center Street Press (October 10, 2017), co-author Newt Gingrich, ISBN 978-1478923046
- Collusion: A Novel, Broadside Books (April 30, 2019), co-author Newt Gingrich, ISBN 978-0062859983
- Shakedown: A Novel, Broadside Books (March 24, 2020), co-author Newt Gingrich, ISBN 978-0062860194
