= Just Mercy =

2019 American biographical legal drama film

- Theatrical release poster
- Directed by: Destin Daniel Cretton
- Screenplay by: Destin Daniel Cretton; Andrew Lanham
- Based on: Just Mercy: A Story of Justice and Redemption by Bryan Stevenson
- Produced by: Gil Netter; Asher Goldstein; Michael B. Jordan
- Starring: Michael B. Jordan; Jamie Foxx; Rob Morgan; Tim Blake Nelson; Rafe Spall; Brie Larson
- Cinematography: Brett Pawlak
- Edited by: Nat Sanders
- Music by: Joel P. West
- Production companies: Endeavor Content; One Community; Participant Media; Macro Media; Gil Netter Productions; Outlier Society
- Distributed by: Warner Bros. Pictures
- Release dates: September 6, 2019 (TIFF); December 25, 2019 (United States)
- Running time: 136 minutes
- Country: United States
- Language: English
- Budget: $25 million
- Box office: $50.9 million

Just Mercy is a 2019 American biographical legal drama film co-written and directed by Destin Daniel Cretton and starring Michael B. Jordan as Bryan Stevenson and Jamie Foxx as Walter McMillian, together with Rob Morgan, Tim Blake Nelson, Rafe Spall, and Brie Larson. It explores the work of Bryan Stevenson, a young defense attorney representing poor black prisoners on death row in the Southern U.S. The film focuses on Stevenson's work with Walter McMillian, who had been wrongfully convicted of murdering a young woman. The film is based on Stevenson's 2014 eponymous memoir, in which he explored his journey to making his life's work the defense of African American prisoners.

Just Mercy, which had its world premiere at the Toronto International Film Festival on September 6, 2019, was theatrically released by Warner Bros. Pictures on December 25, 2019. The film received positive reviews from critics and grossed $50 million. Foxx was nominated for Outstanding Performance by a Male Actor in a Supporting Role at the 26th Screen Actors Guild Awards. Both he and Michael B. Jordan won NAACP Image Awards for their respective roles.

== Plot ==
In 1989, Harvard law graduate Bryan Stevenson travels to Alabama, intending to help defend poor people who cannot afford proper legal representation. Teaming with Eva Ansley, he forms the Equal Justice Initiative in the state capital, Montgomery. He embarks on trying to combat social injustices in criminal law and practice, which have resulted in a high rate of African Americans convicted and incarcerated in the state and nationwide.

Stevenson goes to a state prison to meet inmates who are on death row and who are seeking appeals of their convictions or sentences. Among these is Walter "Johnny D." McMillian, an African American man who was convicted of the 1986 murder of Ronda Morrison, an 18-year-old white woman. McMillian has maintained his innocence.

When Stevenson reviews the evidence in the case, he learns that it hinges entirely on the testimony of convicted felon Ralph Myers. The convict had provided highly contradictory testimony to the prosecution in exchange for a plea deal and lighter sentence in his own pending trial.

Given these issues, Stevenson appeals to the current prosecutor, Tommy Chapman, for aid; he dismisses him without looking at his notes. Stevenson learns that, at the time of the murder, McMillian's family friend Darnell Houston was elsewhere with a witness who had subsequently falsely corroborated Myers' testimony. This evidence would cause the prosecution's case to fall apart, so Stevenson asks Houston to testify to his account. When Stevenson submits his testimony, police arrest Houston for perjury.

Although Stevenson gets the perjury charges dismissed, Houston is intimidated, so he refuses to testify in court. Shortly afterward, Stevenson is threatened by two sheriff deputies, who force him from his car at gunpoint and illegally search the car. They refuse to tell him why he was pulled over, but release him.

During this period, Stevenson had a case on appeal to the U.S. Supreme Court on behalf of another death row inmate, Herbert Lee Richardson; the court denied the appeal. Convicted of killing his ex-girlfriend's niece with a bomb on her porch, Richardson had been sentenced to death by electric chair. Unable to get it overturned, Stevenson promises to be with Richardson in his final moments, and witnesses the execution.

On behalf of McMillian, Stevenson directly confronts Myers. He admits that police coerced his testimony by threatening him with a death sentence. Stevenson appeals to the local court to grant McMillian a retrial and successfully convinces Myers to recant his testimony on the stand, but the judge refuses to grant it.

Stevenson appears on 60 Minutes to rally public support in favor of McMillian, and appeals the court's decision to the Supreme Court of Alabama. The Supreme Court overturns the circuit court's decision, and grants McMillian a retrial. Stevenson tries to have the charges dismissed entirely. He confronts Chapman at home and tries to convince him to join in this motion; Chapman forces him to leave.

On the day of the motion, Stevenson appeals to the judge. That day, Chapman joins him in the motion, the judge dismisses the charges, and McMillian is finally released from prison and reunited with his family.

An epilogue notes that Stevenson and Ansley continue their fight for justice. McMillian remained friends with Stevenson until his natural death in 2013. A follow-up investigation into Morrison's 1986 murder confirmed McMillian's innocence. Evidence suggested that a white man was likely responsible, but the case has never been officially solved. McMillian's former cellmate, Anthony Ray Hinton, remained on death row for 28 years. Stevenson handled his defense and was eventually able to get all the charges dropped. Hinton was released in 2015.

== Cast ==
- Michael B. Jordan as Bryan Stevenson
- Jamie Foxx as Walter McMillian
- Brie Larson as Eva Ansley
- Rob Morgan as Herbert Richardson
- Tim Blake Nelson as Ralph Myers
- Rafe Spall as Tommy Chapman
- O'Shea Jackson Jr. as Anthony Ray Hinton
- Michael Harding as Sheriff Tate
- Karan Kendrick as Minnie McMillian
- C.J. LeBlanc as John McMillan
- Darrell Britt-Gibson as Darnell Houston
- Dominic Bogart as Doug Ansley
- Lindsay Ayliffe as Judge Foster
- Ron Clinton Smith as Woodrow Ikner
- Hayes Mercure as Jeremy Doss
- Kirk Bovill as David Walker
- Terence Rosemore as Jimmy
- Rhoda Griffis as Judge Pamela Baschab
- Norm Lewis as the voice of Newscaster

== Production ==
Development on the film began in 2015, when Broad Green Pictures hired Destin Daniel Cretton to direct, with Michael B. Jordan set to star. In December 2017, Warner Bros. acquired the distribution rights for the film, after Broad Green Pictures had entered bankruptcy. In July 2018, Jamie Foxx was set to co-star. In August 2018, Brie Larson, O'Shea Jackson Jr. and Tim Blake Nelson also joined the cast, and filming started in Montgomery, Alabama, by August 30. Filming in Atlanta, Georgia, began in September. In October 2018, actors Dominic Bogart, Hayes Mercure and Karan Kendrick were added as well.

== Music ==
Just Mercy (Original Motion Picture Soundtrack) is the film score to the 2019 film Just Mercy directed by Destin Daniel Cretton starring Michael B. Jordan, Jamie Foxx, Rob Morgan, Tim Blake Nelson, Rafe Spall, and Brie Larson. The film score is composed by Joel P. West and released through WaterTower Music on December 13, 2019.

== Release ==
The film had its world premiere at the Toronto International Film Festival on September 6, 2019. It received an awards-qualifying limited release on December 25, 2019. Originally set to expand to a wide release on January 17, 2020, the film's expanded distribution was moved up to January 10, 2020, when it opened in 2,375 theaters. In response to the murder of George Floyd, Warner Bros. Pictures made the film free on various streaming platforms during June 2020 to educate the public about systemic racism.

On June 19, 2020, TBS, TNT, and truTV aired the film, along with the 2018 superhero film Black Panther, in which Jordan also starred, to support social justice in celebration of Juneteenth. The broadcast was presented by Anthony Anderson and featured interviews with Bryan Stevenson, along with U.S. Senator Kamala Harris and comic and TV host W. Kamau Bell.

== Reception ==
=== Critical response ===
The review aggregator website Rotten Tomatoes reports an 85% approval rating based on 306 reviews, with an average rating of 7.1/10. The site's critics consensus reads: "Just Mercy dramatizes a real-life injustice with solid performances, a steady directorial hand, and enough urgency to overcome a certain degree of earnest advocacy." On Metacritic, the film has a weighted average score of 68 out of 100 based on 50 critics, indicating "generally favorable" reviews. Audiences polled by CinemaScore gave the film a rare average grade of "A+" on an A+ to F scale, and PostTrak reported it received an average 4.5 out of 5 stars, with 73% of people saying they would definitely recommend it.

=== Box office ===
Just Mercy grossed $36 million in the United States and Canada, and $14.9 million in other territories, for a worldwide total of $50.9 million.

On its first day of limited release, the film made $81,072 from four theaters. Just Mercy made $105,000 in its opening weekend, December 27–29, for a five-day total of $228,072. The film grossed $425,862 over the 15 days of limited release. It took in $3.7 million on the first day of wide release, including $800,000 from Thursday night previews. The film made a total of $10 million over the weekend, finishing fourth at the box office. Just Mercy grossed $5.8 million over its second weekend of wide release, and $7.5 million over the full four-day Martin Luther King Jr. Day holiday, finishing seventh.

=== Accolades ===
Award nominations for Just Mercy
Award	Date of ceremony	Category	Recipient(s)	Result	Ref.
AARP's Movies For Grownups Awards	January 11, 2020	Best Supporting Actor	Jamie Foxx	Nominated	
African-American Film Critics Association	December 2, 2019	Best Supporting Actor	Jamie Foxx	Won	
African-American Film Critics Association	December 2, 2019	Top 10 films of the year	Just Mercy	Won	
Black Reel Awards	February 6, 2020	Outstanding Film	Asher Goldstein and Gil Netter	Nominated	
Black Reel Awards	February 6, 2020	Outstanding Supporting Actor	Jamie Foxx	Nominated	
Black Reel Awards	February 6, 2020	Outstanding Ensemble	Carmen Cuba	Nominated	
NAACP Image Awards	February 22, 2020	Outstanding Motion Picture	Just Mercy	Won	
NAACP Image Awards	February 22, 2020	Outstanding Actor in a Motion Picture	Michael B. Jordan	Won	
NAACP Image Awards	February 22, 2020	Outstanding Supporting Actor in a Motion Picture	Jamie Foxx	Won	
NAACP Image Awards	February 22, 2020	Outstanding Writing in a Motion Picture	Destin Daniel Cretton	Nominated	
NAACP Image Awards	February 22, 2020	Outstanding Breakthrough Role in a Motion Picture	Rob Morgan	Nominated	
NAACP Image Awards	February 22, 2020	Outstanding Ensemble Cast in a Motion Picture	Just Mercy	Won	
National Board of Review	January 8, 2020	Freedom of Expression Award	Just Mercy	Won	
Screen Actors Guild Awards	January 19, 2020	Outstanding Performance by a Male Actor in a Supporting Role	Jamie Foxx	Nominated	

== Legacy ==
In 2024, Just Mercy was used in a psychology study by Stanford University. The researchers concluded that, after watching the film, the study's participants had an increased empathic understanding of formerly incarcerated people.

== See also ==
- List of black films of the 2010s
- Just Mercy (soundtrack)
