= Coos History Museum =

Museum in Coos Bay, Oregon, United States

- Established: 1947
- Location: Coos Bay, Oregon, U.S.
- Coordinates: 43.375605°N 124.2125481°W
- Type: private: history
- Owner: Coos County Historical Society
- Website: cooshistory.org

The Coos History Museum is a history museum located in Coos Bay, Oregon, United States. Opened in 1947 as the Coos-Curry Pioneer and Historical Association Museum, the museum is operated by the Coos County Historical Society.

== History ==
On November 5, 1891, the Coos County Pioneer Association was established, which in time became the Coos County Historical Society. The organization was focused on the pioneers of Coos County on the Southern Oregon coast. Later in 1941 the name changed to the Coos-Curry Pioneer Association to reflect the inclusion of members from neighboring Curry County. The organization opened its first museum in Coquille in July 1947. In January 1958 the museum moved to Simpson Park in North Bend.

The historical society received a land donation in 2004 of a waterfront plot in Coos Bay. After fundraising, construction of a new museum building began in 2011, with construction completed in February 2015. The new museum building was opened on the city's waterfront in 2015. The grand opening of the new museum was in September 2015, with Oregon Governor Kate Brown in attendance.
