= Bryan Stevenson =

American lawyer and social justice activist (born 1959)

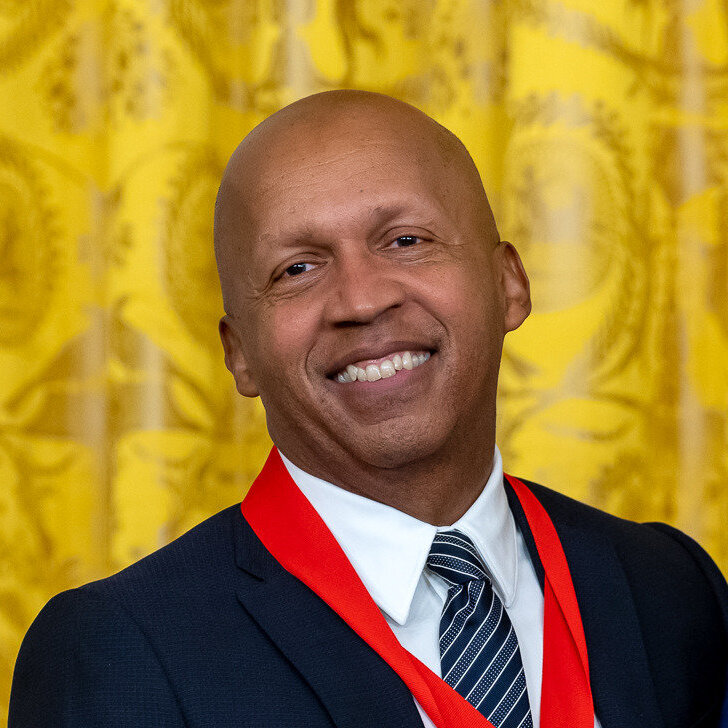
- Stevenson in 2023
- Born: Bryan Allen Stevenson; November 14, 1959 (age 67); Milton, Delaware, U.S.
- Education: Eastern University (BA); Harvard University (JD, MPP)
- Occupations: Director of Equal Justice Initiative; Professor at New York University School of Law
- Known for: Founding Equal Justice Initiative
- Relatives: Alonna Berry (cousin)
- Awards: National Humanities Medal (2021)
- Website: bryanstevenson.com

Bryan Allen Stevenson (born November 14, 1959) is an American lawyer, social justice activist, and law professor at New York University School of Law. He is also the founder and executive director of the Equal Justice Initiative. Based in Montgomery, Alabama, he has challenged bias against the poor and minorities in the criminal justice system, especially children. He has helped achieve United States Supreme Court decisions that prohibit sentencing juvenile offenders to death or to mandatory life terms without parole.

Stevenson was depicted in the 2019 legal drama film Just Mercy, based on his 2014 memoir Just Mercy: A Story of Justice and Redemption. In the memoir, he recounts his work defending Walter McMillian, who had been unjustly convicted and sentenced to death.

Stevenson initiated the National Memorial for Peace and Justice in Montgomery, which honors the names of more than 4,000 African Americans lynched in the twelve states of the South from 1877 to 1950. He argues that the history of slavery and lynchings has influenced the subsequent high rate of death sentences in the South, where it has been disproportionately applied to minorities. A related museum, The Legacy Museum: From Enslavement to Mass Incarceration, offers interpretations to show the connection between the post-Reconstruction period of lynchings and the high rate of incarceration and executions of people of color in the United States.

== Early life ==
Bryan A. Stevenson was born on November 14, 1959, in Milton, a small town in southern Delaware. His father, Howard Carlton Stevenson Sr., had grown up in Milton, and his mother, Alice Gertrude (Golden) Stevenson, was born and grew up in Philadelphia. Her family had moved to the city from Virginia in the Great Migration of the early 20th century. Stevenson has two siblings: an older brother, Howard Jr. and a sister, Christy.

Both parents commuted to the northern part of the state for work, with Howard Sr., working at a General Foods processing plant as a laboratory technician and Alice as an equal opportunity officer at Dover Air Force Base. She particularly emphasized the importance of education to her children.

Stevenson's family attended the Prospect African Methodist Episcopal Church, where as a child, Stevenson played piano and sang in the choir. His later views were influenced by the strong faith of the African Methodist Episcopal Church, where churchgoers were celebrated for "standing up after having fallen down". These experiences informed his belief that "each person in our society is more than the worst thing they've ever done."

When Stevenson was 16, his maternal grandfather, Clarence L. Golden, was stabbed to death in his Philadelphia home during a robbery. The killers received life sentences, an outcome Stevenson thought fair. Stevenson said of the murder: "Because my grandfather was older, his murder seemed particularly cruel. But I came from a world where we valued redemption over revenge."

As a child, Stevenson dealt with segregation and its legacy. He spent his first classroom years at a "colored" elementary school. By the time he entered the second grade, his school was formally desegregated, but the old rules from segregation still applied. Black kids played separately from white kids, and at the doctor's or dentist's office, black kids and their parents continued to use the back door, while whites entered through the front. Pools and other community facilities were informally segregated. Stevenson's father, having grown up in the area, took the ingrained racism in his stride, but his mother openly opposed the de facto segregation. In an interview in 2017, Stevenson recalled how his mother protested the day the black children from town lined up at the back door of the polio vaccination station to receive their shots, waiting hours while the white children went in first.

== Education ==
Stevenson attended Cape Henlopen High School and graduated in 1978. He played on the soccer and baseball teams. He also served as president of the student body and won American Legion public speaking contests. His brother, Howard, takes some credit for helping hone Stevenson's rhetorical skills: "We argued the way brothers argue, but these were serious arguments, inspired I guess by our mother and the circumstances of our family growing up."

Stevenson earned straight As and won a scholarship to Eastern University in St. Davids, Pennsylvania. On campus, he directed the campus gospel choir. Stevenson graduated with a B.A. degree in philosophy from Eastern in 1981. In 1985, Stevenson earned both a J.D. degree from Harvard Law School and an M.A. degree in Public Policy (MPP) from the John F. Kennedy School of Government, also at Harvard University. During law school, as part of a class on race and poverty litigation with Elizabeth Bartholet, he worked for Stephen Bright's Southern Center for Human Rights, an organization that represents death-row inmates throughout the South. During this work, Stevenson found his career calling.

== Career ==
=== Southern Center for Human Rights ===
After graduating from Harvard in 1985, Stevenson moved to Atlanta, and joined the Southern Center for Human Rights full-time. The center divided work by region and Stevenson was assigned to Alabama. In 1989 he was appointed to run the Alabama operation, a resource center and death-penalty defense organization that was funded by Congress. He had a center in Montgomery, the state capital.

=== Equal Justice Initiative ===
When the United States Congress eliminated funding for death-penalty defense, Stevenson converted the center and founded the non-profit Equal Justice Initiative (EJI) in Montgomery. In 1995, he was awarded a MacArthur Grant and put all the money toward supporting the center. He committed to providing legal defense for anyone in Alabama sentenced to the death penalty, as it was the only state that did not provide legal assistance to people on death row. It also has the highest per capita rate of death penalty sentencing.

One of EJI's first cases was the post-conviction appeal of Walter McMillian, who had been confined to death row before being convicted of murder and sentenced to death. Stevenson was able to discredit every element of the prosecution's initial case, which led to McMillian being exonerated and released from jail in 1993.

Stevenson has been particularly concerned about overly harsh sentencing of persons convicted of crimes committed as children, under the age of 18. In 2005, the U.S. Supreme Court ruled in Roper v. Simmons that the death penalty was unconstitutional for persons convicted of crimes committed under the age of 18. Stevenson worked to have the court's thinking about appropriate punishment broadened to related cases applying to children convicted under the age of 17.

EJI mounted a litigation campaign to gain review of cases in which convicted children were sentenced to life-without-parole, including cases without homicide. In Miller v. Alabama (2012), the U.S. Supreme Court ruled in a landmark decision that mandatory sentences of life-without-parole for children 17 and under were unconstitutional; their decision has affected statutes in 29 states. In 2016, the court ruled in Montgomery v. Louisiana that this decision had to be applied retroactively, potentially affecting the sentences of 2300 people nationwide who had been sentenced to life while still children.

As of 2022, the EJI has saved more than 130 people from the death penalty. In addition, it has represented poor people, defended people on appeal, overturned wrongful convictions, and worked to alleviate bias in the criminal justice system.

In recent years, Stevenson and the Equal Justice Initiative have collaborated with regional bar associations, law schools, and community legal programs to expand access to legal education and pro bono defense networks in the American South.

=== Acknowledging slavery ===
The EJI offices are near the landing at the Alabama River where slaves were unloaded in the domestic slave trade; an equal distance away is Court Square, "one of the largest slave auction sites in the country." Stevenson has noted that in downtown Montgomery, there were "dozens" of historic markers and numerous monuments related to Confederate history, but nothing acknowledging the history of slavery, on which the wealth of the South was based and for which it fought the Civil War. He proposed to the state and provided documentation to three slavery sites with historic markers; the Alabama Department of Archives and History told him that it did not want to "sponsor the markers given the potential for controversy." Stevenson worked with an African-American history group to gain sponsorship for this project; the group gained state approval for the three markers in 2013, and these have been installed in Montgomery.

=== National Memorial for Peace and Justice ===
Stevenson acquired six acres of former public housing land in Montgomery for the development of a new project, the National Memorial for Peace and Justice, to commemorate the nearly 4400 persons who were lynched in the South from 1877 to 1950. Numerous lynchings were conducted openly in front of mobs and crowds in county courthouse squares. Stevenson has argued that this history of extrajudicial lynchings by white mobs is closely associated with the subsequent high rate of death sentences imposed in Alabama and other southern states, and to their disproportionate application to minority people. He further argues that this history influences the bias against minorities as expressed in disproportionately high mass incarceration rates for them across the country. The memorial opened in April 2018.

Associated with the Memorial is the Legacy Museum: From Enslavement to Mass Incarceration, which also opened on April 26, 2018. Exhibits in the former slave warehouse include materials on lynching, racial segregation, and mass incarceration since the late 20th century. Stevenson articulates how the treatment of people of color under the criminal justice system is related to the history of slavery and later treatment of minorities in the South.

=== Author ===
Stevenson wrote the critically acclaimed memoir Just Mercy: A Story of Justice and Redemption, published in 2014 by Spiegel & Grau. It was selected by Time magazine as one of the "10 Best Books of Nonfiction" for 2014, and was among The New York Times "100 Notable Books" for the year. It won the 2015 Andrew Carnegie Medal for Excellence in Nonfiction, the 2015 Dayton Literary Peace Prize for Nonfiction, and was voted an American Library Association Notable Book in 2015.

A film based on the book, called Just Mercy, starring Michael B. Jordan as Stevenson with Stevenson himself executive-producing, premiered on September 6, 2019, at the Toronto International Film Festival and was released in theatres on December 25, 2019.

=== Speaker ===
Stevenson maintains an active public speaking schedule, in large part for fundraising for the work of EJI. His speech at TED2012 in Long Beach, California, brought him a wide audience on the Internet. Following his presentation, attendees at the conference contributed more than $1 million to fund a campaign run by Stevenson to end the practice of placing convicted children to serve sentences in adult jails and prisons. By April 2020, his talk had been viewed more than 6.5 million times.

Stevenson has been a commencement speaker and received numerous honorary degrees, including from the following institutions: University of Delaware, 2016, honorary Doctor of Laws degree; Williams College, 2016, honorary doctorate; Loyola University Chicago, Stritch School of Medicine, 2011, Doctor of Humane Letters, honoris causa; College of the Holy Cross, 2015; Wesleyan University, 2016, honorary degree; University of Mississippi, 2017s fall convocation; Northeastern University, fall 2017 convocation; Emory University, spring 2020 commencement and honorary doctor of laws degree.

In June 2017, Stevenson delivered the 93rd Ware Lecture at the General Assembly of the Unitarian Universalist Association in New Orleans, Louisiana.

Stevenson is featured in episode 45 of the podcast Criminal by Radiotopia from PRX. Host Phoebe Judge talked with Stevenson about his experiences during his 30 years spent working to get people off death row, and about his take on those deserving of mercy.

On May 24, 2018, Stevenson delivered the Commencement address for the Johns Hopkins University Class of 2018.

On May 20, 2019, Stevenson delivered the Commencement address at the University of Pennsylvania.

On May 21, 2021, Freedom, Justice, and Hope with Bryan Stevenson premiered on Jazz at Lincoln Center where he provided reflections on the American narrative of racism and performed pieces on the piano such as "Honeysuckle Rose".

On May 8, 2022, Stevenson delivered the Commencement address at Eastern Mennonite University in Harrisonburg, Virginia. He became the second person to receive an honorary doctorate from the university, the other being Nobel Peace Prize winner Leymah Gbowee.

On May 7, 2023, Stevenson delivered the Commencement address for the Ohio State University Class of 2023.

On October 5, 2023, Stevenson spoke at the President's Leadership Forum held by Whitworth University in Spokane, Washington, where he received an honorary doctorate.

=== Bryan Allen Stevenson School of Excellence ===
The Bryan Allen Stevenson School of Excellence (BASSE), a free public charter school in Georgetown, Delaware, was founded by Alonna Berry, an educator and cousin of Stevenson in August 2024. Stevenson gifted the school a $100k grant.

== Awards and honors ==
In November 2018, Stevenson received the Benjamin Franklin Award from the American Philosophical Society as a "Drum major for justice and mercy." In 2020, he shared the Right Livelihood Award with Nasrin Sotoudeh, Ales Bialiatski and Lottie Cunningham Wren.

In 2024, he was elected to the American Philosophical Society.

- 1991 ACLU National Medal of Liberty
- 1995 MacArthur Fellow
- 2000 Olof Palme Prize
- 2009 Gruber Prize for Justice
- 2011 Four Freedoms Award in Freedom From Fear
- 2012 Smithsonian magazine's American Ingenuity Award in Social Progress
- 2015 Andrew Carnegie Medal for Excellence in Fiction and Nonfiction
- 2015 Dayton Literary Peace Prize for Nonfiction
- 2015 Time 100: The 100 Most Influential People
- 2016 Honorary Doctor of Laws degree conferred by Princeton University
- 2017 Honorary Doctor of Civil Law degree, conferred honoris causa by the University of Oxford
- 2017 The Stowe Prize for Writing to Advance Social Justice
- 2018 People's Champion Award from the 44th People's Choice Awards
- 2018 The Benjamin Franklin Award for distinguished public service from the American Philosophical Society
- 2019 Golden Plate Award of the American Academy of Achievement
- 2019 Honorary Doctor of Laws degree conferred by the University of Pennsylvania
- 2020 Right Livelihood Award
- 2020 National Association of Criminal Defense Lawyers Lifetime Achievement Award
- 2020 Global Citizen Prize for Global Citizen of the Year
- 2021 The Fitzgerald Prize for Literary Excellence
- 2021 National Humanities Medal
- 2023 Honorary Doctor of Humane Letters degree conferred by Whitworth University
- 2025 Stockholm Prize in Criminology
- 2025 Thomas Jefferson Foundation Medal in Citizen Leadership, conferred by The University of Virginia and the Thomas Jefferson Foundation at Monticello.

== Personal life ==
Stevenson is a lifelong bachelor and has stated that his career is incompatible with married life. He has resided in Montgomery, Alabama since 1985.

== Publications ==
By Bryan Stevenson:

- Stevenson, Bryan (June 2002). "The Politics of Fear and Death: Successive Problems in Capital Federal Habeas Corpus Cases" (PDF). NYU Law Review. 77 (3): 699–795.
- Stevenson, Bryan (Summer 2003). "The Ultimate Authority on the Ultimate Punishment: The Requisite Role of the Jury in Capital Sentencing" (PDF). Alabama Law Review. 54 (4): 1091–1155. Archived from the original (PDF) on September 8, 2015.
- Stevenson, Bryan (Summer 2006). "Confronting Mass Imprisonment and Restoring Fairness to Collateral Review of Criminal Cases" (PDF). Harvard Civil Rights-Civil Liberties Law Review. 41 (2): 339–367. OCLC 1002849873. Archived from the original (PDF) on February 18, 2012.
- Stevenson, Bryan (2014). Just Mercy: A Story of Justice and Redemption (print) (First ed.). New York: Spiegel & Grau. ISBN 9780812994520. LCCN 2014430900. OCLC 978357094.
- Stevenson, Bryan; Ifill, Sherrilyn; Lynch, Loretta; Thompson, Anthony C. (2018). A Perilous Path: Talking Race, Inequality, and the Law (First ed.). New York: The New Press. ISBN 9781620973950.

By EJI:

- Equal Justice Initiative (January 2008). "Cruel and Unusual: Sentencing 13-and 14-Year Old Children to Die in Prison" (PDF). Equal Justice Initiative.

== Adaptations ==
- Just Mercy (2019), film directed by Destin Daniel Cretton, based on book Just Mercy: A Story of Justice and Redemption
