= Lucky Lu =

2025 American drama film

- Film poster
- Directed by: Lloyd Lee Choi
- Written by: Lloyd Lee Choi
- Based on: Same Old by Lloyd Lee Choi
- Produced by: Destin Daniel Cretton; Nina Yang Bongiovi; Asher Goldstein; Tony Yang; Ron Najor; Jeyun Munford
- Starring: Chang Chen; Fala Chen; Carabelle Manna Wei
- Cinematography: Norm Li
- Edited by: Brendan Mills
- Music by: Charles Humenry
- Production companies: Significant Productions; Cedar Road; Hisako Films; Gold House; Big Buddha Pictures
- Release date: May 19, 2025 (Cannes)
- Running time: 103 minutes
- Countries: Canada; United States
- Language: English

Lucky Lu is a 2025 drama film written and directed by Lloyd Lee Choi, in his feature film directorial debut. Adapted from Choi's 2022 short film Same Old, it stars Chang Chen, Fala Chen, and Carabelle Manna Wei.

The film had its world premiere at the Directors' Fortnight section of the 2025 Cannes Film Festival on May 19, 2025, where it was eligible for the Caméra d'Or. At the 62nd Golden Horse Awards, the film was nominated for five awards and won three, including Best Leading Actor for Chen, Best New Director for Choi, and Best Original Film Score for Charles Humenry. It also received two nominations at the 41st Independent Spirit Awards, including Best Director for Choi and Best Lead Performance for Chen.

== Plot ==
Lu is working as a food delivery person because he lost all his money trying to start a restaurant. He's finally made enough money to bring his wife and daughter over to New York City, so he leases a 3 bedroom apartment and moves out of the hostel.

His rented e-bike gets stolen. Since he was delivering under a fake delivery profile and renting his e-bike from the same person, he is barred from continuing to use the delivery profile. He also finds out that the lessor for his apartment has scammed him and disappeared with his money. The building's superintendent won't let Lu move in until he returns with another first month's rent and deposit.

Lu spends a night homeless and tries to pawn his possessions and call in favors. He steals an e bike. His failed restaurant keeps coming back to haunt him as he tries to call in favors and borrow money. He ends up going to a loan shark who demands collateral, as well as his passport and visa. The loan shark rejects him due to his failed restaurant.

He ends up convincing the superintendent to let him move in. His wife and daughter arrive and move in to the apartment. His daughter Yaya wants to spend the day with him, since they haven't seen each other in-person for 5 years.

They spend the day together trying to cobble together money, selling the e-bike, and more items. Lu spots the scammer going to an illegal gambling den and unsuccessfully tries to recover his money.

At the same time, Yaya wanders around looking for him, stumbles into a brownstone during an open house. While playing, she discovers a watch and takes it. Eventually, father and daughter reunite, with the daughter exclaiming that the father is never around when she needs him. The daughter offers up the watch, but the father insists on returning it.

They go to the father's restaurant partner's nail salon to plead for a goldfish for the daughter. While the daughter is getting her nails done, the father attempts to steal another e-bike. In the struggle for the e-bike, Lu is struck by a car that drives off without a trace. Lu gives up and returns to take his daughter home. The e-bike owner (another delivery driver), follows Lu and provides the license plate number of the car in the hit-and-run.

Lu and Yaya return home to discover Si has spent all day cleaning and furnishing the apartment. The doorbell buzzes-it is a delivery driver with dinner. Pained expressions are on Lu's face at each of these moments. Lu does not explain their desperate situation to his wife. At dinner, Yaya decliens to eat, aware of their family's economic situation.

In the morning, Lu sits by the window and sees the sun shine through the window, as it fulfills the promise the scammer made at the beginning of the movie.

== Cast ==
- Chang Chen as Lu Jia Cheng
- Fala Chen as Si Yu
- Carabelle Manna Wei as Yaya
- Fiona Fu as Yu Tong
- Laith Nakli as Markos
- Perry Yung as Zhang
- Fady Rizk as Bodega Clerk

== Production ==
In September 2024, it was announced Chang Chen would star in the film, with Lloyd Lee Choi directing from a screenplay he wrote. Destin Daniel Cretton and Nina Yang Bongiovi were set to serve as producers. Forest Whitaker, Jennifer Pritzker serve as an executive producers. The film is a full-length expansion of Choi's 2022 short film Same Old.

Principal photography began in December 2024, in New York City.

== Release and reception ==
It had its world premiere at the 2025 Cannes Film Festival in the Directors' Fortnight section on May 19, 2025.

Awards and nominations
Award	Year	Category	Recipient(s)	Result	Ref.
Calgary International Film Festival	2025	International Narrative Competition	Lucky Lu	Nominated	
Cannes Film Festival	2025	Caméra d'Or	Lucky Lu	Nominated	
El Gouna Film Festival	2025	El Gouna Silver Star for Narrative Film	Lucky Lu	Won	
Filmfest Hamburg	2025	NDR Young Talent Award	Lloyd Lee Choi	Won	
Film Independent Spirit Awards	2026	Best Director	Lloyd Lee Choi	Nominated	
Film Independent Spirit Awards	2026	Best Lead Performance	Chang Chen	Nominated	
Golden Horse Awards	2025	Best Leading Actor	Chang Chen	Won	
Golden Horse Awards	2025	Best New Director	Lloyd Lee Choi	Won	
Golden Horse Awards	2025	Best Adapted Screenplay	Lloyd Lee Choi	Nominated	
Golden Horse Awards	2025	Best Cinematography	Norm Li	Nominated	
Golden Horse Awards	2025	Best Original Film Score	Charles Humenry	Won	
