= Joel P. West =

American composer, singer, and songwriter

- Genres: Film score, jazz, experimental pop, roots rock, soul, new-age
- Occupations: Composer, singer, songwriter
- Instruments: Vocals, piano, keyboards, guitar
- Years active: 2012–present
- Formerly of: Joel P. West and the Tree Ring

Joel P. West is an American composer, singer, songwriter and musician based in San Diego. He is the lead vocalist and guitarist of the band Joel P. West and the Tree Ring. He is also known for his collaborations with filmmaker Destin Daniel Cretton, composing such films of his as Short Term 12 (2013), The Glass Castle, (2017) Just Mercy (2019) and Shang-Chi and the Legend of the Ten Rings (2021).

== Select discography ==
=== Films ===
- I Am Not a Hipster (2012)
- Short Term 12 (2013)
- About Alex (2014)
- Grandma (2015)
- Janey Makes a Play (2015)
- Safelight (2015)
- Band of Robbers (2015)
- Youth in Oregon (2016)
- All Summers End (2017)
- The Bachelors (2017)
- The Glass Castle (2017)
- Just Mercy (2019)
- Shang-Chi and the Legend of the Ten Rings (2021)

=== Television ===
- Wonder Man (2026)
