= Brett Pawlak =

American cinematographer

Brett Pawlak is an American cinematographer known for his work on independent and mainstream films. A frequent collaborator of director Destin Daniel Cretton, he gained recognition for his cinematography on Short Term 12 (2013), where he used handheld camerawork and natural lighting to create a realistic aesthetic.

In 2016, he served as the cinematographer for the pilot episode of This Is Us, establishing the show's visual style. Pawlak later reunited with Cretton for Just Mercy (2019), which featured a character-driven cinematographic approach. In 2023, he was announced as the director of photography for Marvel Studios' Wonder Man.

== Career ==
In 2013, Pawlak served as the cinematographer for Short Term 12, collaborating with director Destin Daniel Cretton to develop a naturalistic visual style. Having previously worked with Cretton on the original Short Term 12 short film and I Am Not a Hipster, Pawlak employed handheld camerawork and available light to enhance the film’s realism. His cinematography for the film received positive recognition for its naturalistic approach. His visual style allowed for fluid movement within scenes, contributing to the film’s blend of humor and emotional depth.

In 2016, Pawlak served as the cinematographer for the pilot episode of This Is Us, helping to establish the visual tone of the series. His work introduced a handheld shooting style that facilitated seamless transitions between different time periods, a key element of the show's narrative structure. When the series was officially ordered, Yasu Tanida took over as the primary cinematographer but retained aspects of Pawlak’s stylistic approach, including the use of handheld camerawork across eras.

In 2019, Pawlak served as the cinematographer for Just Mercy, his fourth consecutive feature-length collaboration with director Destin Daniel Cretton. Pawlak’s cinematography for the film received positive industry recognition for its intimate and character-driven visual style. His work contributed to the film’s emotional depth and portrayal of its legal drama. While Just Mercy was not nominated at Camerimage that year, Pawlak’s cinematography was noted in discussions on the film-versus-digital debate.

In 2023, Pawlak was announced as the director of photography for Marvel Studios' streaming series Wonder Man. The series reunites Pawlak with executive producer Destin Daniel Cretton.

== Filmography ==
=== Feature film ===
Key
| † | Denotes films that have not yet been released |

| Year | Title | Director | Notes |
|---|---|---|---|
| 2012 | I Am Not a Hipster | Destin Daniel Cretton | |
| 2013 | Short Term 12 | Destin Daniel Cretton | |
| 2014 | Hellion | Kat Candler | |
| 2015 | The Wannabe | Nick Sandow | |
| 2015 | We Are Your Friends | Max Joseph | |
| 2015 | The Meddler | Lorene Scafaria | |
| 2016 | All We Had | Katie Holmes | |
| 2016 | Max Steel | Stewart Hendler | |
| 2017 | MDMA | Angie Wang | |
| 2017 | The Glass Castle | Destin Daniel Cretton | |
| 2017 | Unicorn Store | Brie Larson | |
| 2018 | Life Itself | Dan Fogelman | |
| 2018 | Instant Family | Sean Anders | |
| 2019 | Just Mercy | Destin Daniel Cretton | |
| 2020 | The 24th | Kevin Willmott | |
| 2022 | A Jazzman's Blues | Tyler Perry | |
| 2026 | He Bled Neon | Drew Kirsch | |
| 2026 | Spider-Man: Brand New Day | Destin Daniel Cretton | |

=== Television ===
| Year | Title | Director | Notes |
|---|---|---|---|
| 2011 | Pretty Tough | Stewart Hendler | |
| 2011–2013 | H+: The Digital Series | Stewart Hendler | 48 episodes |
| 2016 | This Is Us | John Requa; Glenn Ficarra | Episode "Pilot" |
| 2020 | Next | | 9 episodes |
| 2021 | The Republic of Sarah | Kat Candler | Episode "Pilot" |
| 2023 | American Born Chinese | Destin Daniel Cretton | Episode "What Guy Are You" |
| 2026 | Wonder Man | Destin Daniel Cretton; Tiffany Johnson | Episodes "Matinee", "Self-Tape", "Found Footage" and "Callback" |

Miniseries

| Year | Title | Director | Notes |
|---|---|---|---|
| 2012 | Halo 4: Forward Unto Dawn | Stewart Hendler | |
| 2022 | Echoes | Li Lu; Valerie Weiss | Episodes "Party", "Body" and "Falls" |
