= San Diego Film Critics Society Awards 2013 =

Annual US film awards ceremony

18th SDFCS Awards

December 11, 2013

Best Film:
Her

Best Director:
Alfonso Cuarón
Gravity

The 18th San Diego Film Critics Society Awards were announced on December 11, 2013.

== Winners and nominees ==
=== Best Actor ===
Oscar Isaac – Inside Llewyn Davis

- Chiwetel Ejiofor – 12 Years a Slave
- Tom Hanks – Captain Phillips
- Matthew McConaughey – Dallas Buyers Club
- Joaquin Phoenix – Her

=== Best Actress ===
Cate Blanchett – Blue Jasmine

- Sandra Bullock – Gravity
- Adèle Exarchopoulos – Blue Is the Warmest Colour
- Brie Larson – Short Term 12
- Emma Thompson – Saving Mr. Banks

=== Best Animated Film ===
The Wind Rises

- The Croods
- Despicable Me 2
- Frozen
- Get a Horse!

=== Best Cinematography ===
To the Wonder – Emmanuel Lubezki

- Gravity – Emmanuel Lubezki
- The Great Gatsby – Simon Duggan
- Inside Llewyn Davis – Bruno Delbonnel
- Prisoners – Roger Deakins

=== Best Director ===
Alfonso Cuarón – Gravity

- Joel Coen and Ethan Coen – Inside Llewyn Davis
- Destin Daniel Cretton – Short Term 12
- Spike Jonze – Her
- Steve McQueen – 12 Years a Slave

=== Best Documentary ===
The Act of Killing

- 20 Feet from Stardom
- Blackfish
- Let the Fire Burn
- Stories We Tell

=== Best Editing ===
Captain Phillips – Christopher Rouse

- 12 Years a Slave – Joe Walker
- Gravity – Alfonso Cuarón and Mark Sanger
- Her – Eric Zumbrunnen and Jeff Buchanan
- The Hunger Games: Catching Fire – Alan Edward Bell

=== Best Ensemble Performance ===
American Hustle

- 12 Years a Slave
- Prisoners
- Short Term 12
- The Way, Way Back

=== Best Film ===
Her

- 12 Years a Slave
- Gravity
- Inside Llewyn Davis
- Short Term 12

=== Best Foreign Language Film ===
Drug War • China / Hong Kong

- Blue Is the Warmest Colour • Belgium / France / Spain
- The Broken Circle Breakdown • Belgium / Netherlands
- The Hunt • Denmark / Sweden
- No • Chile / France / Mexico / United States

=== Best Production Design ===
The Great Gatsby – Catherine Martin and Karen Murphy

- 12 Years a Slave – Adam Stockhausen
- Gravity – Andy Nicholson
- Her – K. K. Barrett
- Saving Mr. Banks – Michael Corenblith

=== Best Score ===
Her – Arcade Fire

- 12 Years a Slave – Hans Zimmer
- The Broken Circle Breakdown – Bjorn Eriksson
- Gravity – Steven Price
- Rush – Hans Zimmer

=== Best Original Screenplay ===
Her – Spike Jonze

- Blue Jasmine – Woody Allen
- Enough Said – Nicole Holofcener
- Inside Llewyn Davis – Joel Coen and Ethan Coen
- Prisoners – Aaron Guzikowski

=== Best Adapted Screenplay ===
Before Midnight – Richard Linklater, Julie Delpy, and Ethan Hawke

- 12 Years a Slave – John Ridley
- Captain Phillips – Billy Ray
- Short Term 12 – Destin Daniel Cretton
- The Spectacular Now – Scott Neustadter and Michael H. Weber

=== Best Supporting Actor ===
Jared Leto – Dallas Buyers Club

- Daniel Brühl – Rush
- Michael Fassbender – 12 Years a Slave
- James Gandolfini – Enough Said
- Sam Rockwell – The Way, Way Back

=== Best Supporting Actress ===
Shailene Woodley – The Spectacular Now

- Elizabeth Banks – The Hunger Games: Catching Fire
- Sally Hawkins – Blue Jasmine
- Jennifer Lawrence – American Hustle
- Lupita Nyong'o – 12 Years a Slave
