= Ron Najor =

- Education: University of California, San Diego; San Diego State University
- Occupation: Filmmaker
- Years active: 2001–present
- Notable work: I Am Not a Hipster; Short Term 12

Ron Najor is a filmmaker recognized for his work in independent cinema. Najor produced Destin Daniel Cretton's feature debut, I Am Not a Hipster, which premiered at the 2012 Sundance Film Festival, and Short Term 12 (2013), which won both the Grand Jury Prize and Audience Award at SXSW.

== Early life ==
As a San Diego native, Najor began his academic journey at a junior college before briefly attending the University of California, San Diego (UCSD) as a literature major. Seeking a different path, he transferred to San Diego State University (SDSU), where he developed an interest in filmmaking. He pursued a double major in psychology and film, later earning a master's degree from SDSU despite the common recommendation to study at different institutions for undergraduate and graduate degrees.

After graduating in 2002, Najor moved to Los Angeles and worked as a production assistant while also returning to SDSU to teach introductory film production. His early career included roles in editing, directing, and behind-the-scenes documentary work before he transitioned into producing.

== Career ==
In 2011, Najor produced I Am Not a Hipster, a drama directed by Destin Daniel Cretton. As the lead producer, he oversaw production under Uncle Freddy Productions. The film, which explores themes of grief and artistic struggle, presents an intimate, character-driven narrative set within San Diego’s indie-rock scene. Najor worked closely with Cretton and the cast to develop the film's naturalistic style. I Am Not a Hipster received recognition on the festival circuit, contributing to Najor's growing reputation in independent filmmaking.

In 2012, Najor served as a producer on Short Term 12, reuniting with director Cretton after their collaboration on I Am Not a Hipster. Najor was involved in securing financing and managing production logistics for the film, which was shot over 20 days in Los Angeles. His work included helping the film navigate financial challenges, including obtaining grants such as the Kenneth Rainin Foundation post-production grant from the San Francisco Film Society. Short Term 12 went on to win both the Grand Jury Prize and the Audience Award at SXSW 2013.

In 2024, Najor joined Cretton's newly launched multimedia production company, Hisako, as Vice President of Film. Having previously held the same role at Cretton's former production company. The company launched under Disney Entertainment Television’s Onyx Collective, with its first major project being the live-action adaptation of Naruto, which Cretton is set to write and direct for Lionsgate.

Najor directed and starred in the feature-length film Adjunct, which premiered in 2025 and was based on his own experiences as an adjunct professor.
