= Wonder Man (TV series) =

2026 Marvel Studios television series

- Genre: Comedy; Superhero
- Created by: Destin Daniel Cretton; Andrew Guest
- Based on: Marvel Comics
- Showrunner: Andrew Guest
- Starring: Yahya Abdul-Mateen II; X Mayo; Zlatko Burić; Ben Kingsley; Arian Moayed; Joe Pantoliano; Byron Bowers; Josh Gad
- Music by: Joel P. West
- Country of origin: United States
- Original language: English
- No. of seasons: 1
- No. of episodes: 8

Production
- Executive producers: Kevin Feige; Stephen Broussard; Jonathan Schwartz; Louis D'Esposito; Brad Winderbaum; Destin Daniel Cretton; Andrew Guest
- Producer: Bonnie Muñoz
- Production locations: Los Angeles, California
- Cinematography: Brett Pawlak; Armando Salas
- Editors: Gina Sansom; Nena Erb; Cassie Dixon
- Running time: 26–36 minutes
- Production company: Marvel Television

Original release
- Network: Disney+
- Release: January 27, 2026

Related
- Marvel Cinematic Universe television series

Wonder Man is an American television series created by Destin Daniel Cretton and Andrew Guest for the streaming service Disney+, based on the Marvel Comics character Simon Williams / Wonder Man. It is the 17th television series in the Marvel Cinematic Universe (MCU) from Marvel Studios and was produced under its Marvel Television label. Sharing continuity with the films of the MCU, the series follows actors Simon Williams and Trevor Slattery. Guest served as showrunner.

Yahya Abdul-Mateen II stars as Simon Williams, alongside X Mayo, Zlatko Burić, Ben Kingsley (Slattery), Arian Moayed, Joe Pantoliano, Byron Bowers, and Josh Gad. In December 2021, Cretton signed an overall deal with Marvel Studios to create television series for Disney+, with a comedy series already in development at that point. Two different ideas about actors, one centered on Simon Williams and the other on Trevor Slattery, were combined into a single series which was reported as Wonder Man in June 2022, with Guest involved and Cretton directing episodes. Kingsley was set to return from previous MCU media in August and Abdul-Mateen joined the cast that October. Filming began in April 2023 on location in Los Angeles, with James Ponsoldt, Tiffany Johnson, and Stella Meghie also directing episodes. Production was shut down in May due to the 2023 Writers Guild of America strike, and resumed by early January 2024. Filming concluded that March and post-production ended around September. The series was officially announced by Marvel Studios a month later.

All eight episodes of Wonder Man were released on Disney+ on January 27, 2026. The series is part of Phase Six of the MCU and was released under the "Marvel Spotlight" banner. Its release was delayed by over a year due to the strike and changes to Marvel's release schedule. It received positive reviews from critics, with Abdul-Mateen receiving a Primetime Emmy Award nomination. The series was renewed for a second season in March 2026, but it was canceled that July.

== Premise ==
In the Marvel Cinematic Universe (MCU), superpowered individuals are banned from working in Hollywood by the Doorman Clause. Struggling actor Simon Williams, who secretly has powers, forms an unlikely friendship with Trevor Slattery as the pair attempt to land roles in a remake of the in-universe superhero film Wonder Man.

== Cast ==
- Yahya Abdul-Mateen II as Simon Williams:
  A struggling actor who auditions for the lead role in the remake of an in-universe Wonder Man film. Simon has ionic energy-based superpowers, giving him superhuman strength and the ability to create explosions. Showrunner Andrew Guest and Marvel Studios executive Brian Gay explained that Simon just wants to be an accomplished actor and does not care about his powers, which he does not fully understand. Simon has to hide his powers due to the Doorman Clause which bans superpowered individuals from working in the Marvel Cinematic Universe (MCU)'s fictional version of Hollywood. Abdul-Mateen approached the way that the character's powers are "bottled up" like someone with anger management issues. He was drawn to Simon's awkwardness, passion for acting, and relatability, and appreciated being able to explore a character with depth, including through his relationship with his Haitian family, while still being able to do some "superpower stuff every once in a while". Kameron J. Meadows portrays a young Simon.
- X Mayo as Janelle Jackson: Simon's agent
- Zlatko Burić as Von Kovak:
  The director of the Wonder Man remake. Guest said he is a combination of filmmakers Werner Herzog, Krzysztof Kieślowski, Paul Thomas Anderson, and Christopher Nolan.
- Ben Kingsley as Trevor Slattery:
  An experienced actor who took on the guise of terrorist leader the Mandarin before being kidnapped by Xu Wenwu's Ten Rings organization. Executive producer Brad Winderbaum said the series concludes a trilogy for Slattery following the character's appearances in the MCU films Iron Man 3 (2013) and Shang-Chi and the Legend of the Ten Rings (2021). In Wonder Man, Slattery returns to Hollywood after the events of those films hoping to find a second chance and live up to his mother's hopes for him as an actor. Gay said the series would show Slattery taking ownership for his past behavior. Guest compared Slattery to Chauncey Gardiner from the film Being There (1979) and the title character of the film Forrest Gump (1994), saying he gets "caught up in bigger-picture things". Winderbaum described Slattery's character arc in the series as sincere, earnest, and uncynical, with Kingsley adding that Slattery gets pulled in two directions by the story. Some of Slattery's backstory is shown, based on ideas that Kingsley developed when he was first cast as the character for Iron Man 3.
- Arian Moayed as P. Cleary: A Department of Damage Control (DODC) agent who considers Simon to be a threat
- Joe Pantoliano as a fictional version of himself:
  Pantoliano co-starred with Slattery in the in-universe series South Shore Hospital and is seen as a rival by Slattery. He represents what Slattery could have been if he made different life choices. Pantoliano ultimately replaces Slattery in the in-universe Wonder Man film, a joke that was inspired by the film The Player (1992).
- Byron Bowers as DeMarr Davis / Doorman:
  A former doorman at the Wilcox Club in Los Angeles who is transported to a door-filled dimension. This gives him the ability to phase through solid matter, and for objects to teleport by passing through his body. After becoming an actor, Davis's powers cause an on-set incident that lead to the creation of the Doorman Clause. Guest saw Davis as a cautionary tale for the kind of acting career that Simon could end up with.
- Josh Gad as a fictional version of himself:
  A conceited, ultra-famous actor who befriends Davis and gets him into acting. Gad disappears inside Davis, leading to the creation of the Doorman Clause. Director and co-creator Destin Daniel Cretton thought it was funny to take a "Disney icon" and turn him into the devil on Davis's shoulder. The series does not reveal where Gad goes, but the production did record dialogue of Gad living inside Davis.

Additional cast members include: Ashley Greene as a fictional version of herself; Béchir Sylvain as Sanford Williams, Simon's late father who took him to see the original Wonder Man film when he was a child; Olivia Thirlby as Vivian, an actress and Simon's ex-girlfriend; Phumzile Sitole as Lauren, the director of the American Horror Story episode Simon is fired from; Jon A. Abrahams as Frank Preminger, Davis's agent; Dane Larsen as Brent Willard, the actor who played the title character in the original Wonder Man; Shola Adewusi as Martha Williams, Simon's mother; Demetrius Grosse as Eric Williams, Simon's "stable" older brother who works in insurance; Dan Donohue as DODC Deputy Secretary Heyerdahl; Charlotte Ross as Bridget, owner of the Wilcox Club; Mario Lopez as a fictional version of himself who hosts Hot Goss; Joseph D. Reitman as Patrick Connor, a drug dealer who Slattery owes money to; Brandon Wardell as Jayden, someone who records Simon using his powers; Carlito Olivero as Esteban, Jayden's chamoy-making business partner; Bradley Tejeda, Alex Polcyn, Carlos Leal, and Simon Templeman respectively as Olly, Jake, Manuel, and Richard, all actors auditioning for a role in the Wonder Man remake; Juliette Ortega as Melanie, Kovak's assistant; Lauren Weedman as The New York Times reporter Kathy Friedman; Blake Robbins as Chuck Eastman, a DODC worker whom Simon shadows to gain access to the prison where Slattery is held; and Torrey Vogel as a DODC agent.

== Episodes ==
No.	Title	Directed by	Written by	Original release date
1	"Matinee"	Destin Daniel Cretton	Andrew Guest	January 27, 2026
Struggling actor Simon Williams is fired from a small role in the series American Horror Story after delaying production by overthinking his character and making repeated requests for changes. He is dumped by his girlfriend Vivian the same day. Simon meets actor Trevor Slattery, known for playing the "Mandarin" as part of a terrorist plot, (Note: As depicted in the film Iron Man 3 (2013)) who informs Simon that he is auditioning for acclaimed director Von Kovak's remake of the 1980s superhero film Wonder Man. As Wonder Man was one of his favorite childhood movies, Simon begs his agent Janelle Jackson for a chance to audition but is rejected due to his firing and behavior. Simon gets the audition information from her computer and goes anyway. After seeing Simon panicking about how to approach the character, Slattery advises him to give a more natural performance which helps Simon in the audition. After the pair have drinks, Slattery is called by Department of Damage Control (DODC) agent P. Cleary to confirm that he has made contact with Simon, who is suspected of having superpowers and is considered unstable and dangerous.
2	"Self-Tape"	Destin Daniel Cretton	Andrew Guest	January 27, 2026
After he was kidnapped from prison and held by Xu Wenwu's Ten Rings criminal organization, (Note: As depicted in the Marvel One-Shot short film All Hail the King (2014) and the film Shang-Chi and the Legend of the Ten Rings (2021)) Slattery returns to Hollywood intent on living up to his mother's hopes for him as an actor. He is immediately arrested by the FBI and Cleary offers him the option of working for the DODC in exchange for not finishing his prison sentence. In the present, Janelle tells Simon that his Wonder Man audition impressed the casting director and he has been asked to do a self-tape audition for an independent film. Simon gets frustrated trying to film the audition himself, and seeing Vivian in an old self-tape video causes his powers to activate: his body releases an explosion of energy inside his apartment. Simon asks Slattery for help with the audition just as Cleary tells Slattery to use a device to hack Simon's computer. After unsuccessfully trying to film the audition at a self-tape studio, Slattery's apartment, and the house of Slattery's rival Joe Pantoliano, the pair return to Simon's apartment and film a successful take. Slattery secretly hacks Simon's computer and also discovers damage from the explosion.
3	"Pacoima"	James Ponsoldt	Paul Welsh & Madeline Walter	January 27, 2026
Cleary is unable to find evidence of Simon's powers from his hacked computer. He tells Slattery that he needs to go to Simon's childhood home in Pacoima, Los Angeles, for the birthday party of Simon's mother Martha, using a wiretap to record his conversations. Slattery convinces Simon to take him and is introduced to Martha, Simon's brother Eric, and other relatives. While Martha is proud of Simon, Eric is dismissive of his career and Slattery finds that none of the other relatives are close to Simon or know much about him. Martha tells Slattery that Simon has always been lonely and she is happy that he has made a friend. Simon argues with Eric and in a burst of anger he destroys the kitchen island that Eric recently had added. Simon and Slattery leave the party, and Simon states that Slattery is the first person outside his family to know about his powers. He considers whether Eric is right and it is time for him to give up acting. Slattery decides to destroy the recording from his wiretap, just as Janelle calls to inform them that they have both been given callbacks for roles in Wonder Man.
4	"Doorman"	James Ponsoldt	Zeke Nicholson	January 27, 2026
Some time earlier, DeMarr Davis works as a doorman at the Wilcox Club in Los Angeles when he is exposed to toxic waste from a Roxxon dumpster and is transported to a door-filled dimension. This gives him the ability to phase through solid matter, and for objects to teleport by passing through his body. After he saves actor Josh Gad and other club patrons during a fire, the press dubs Davis "Doorman" and Gad hires him as a bodyguard. While trying to come up with an interesting hook for his heist film Cash Grab, Gad decides to cast Davis as one of the robbers and use his powers in the film. Cash Grab is a success and Davis's celebrity grows, but overexposure and public criticisms lead him to alcoholism. During the filming of a sequel, Cash Grab 2, Davis loses control of his abilities and Gad disappears while passing through his body. With no one able to find Gad, the DODC places Davis under lifelong surveillance. The Hollywood studios create the Doorman Clause, banning superpowered people from working in the industry and requiring actors to sign contracts stating they have no powers.
5	"Found Footage"	Tiffany Johnson	Anayat Fakhraie	January 27, 2026
Slattery helps Simon—who is already anxious about the callback—celebrate the good news and ignores calls from Cleary. The pair are cornered by a group of drug dealers that Slattery owes money to, forcing Simon to use his powers to incapacitate them. They spot a boy who has recorded the incident with his GoPro, and the two give chase to retrieve the footage. In the car, they read a scene sent by Janelle where Slattery's character, sidekick Barnaby, betrays Wonder Man for a price. They spot the boy, Jayden, who tells them that he will erase the footage if Simon helps him get back his stolen motorcycle from a man named Esteban. Arriving at Esteban's house, Esteban tells them that Jayden is lying. The drug dealers arrive and hold Jayden hostage in exchange for Slattery. Esteban's friends help Slattery delete the footage from Jayden's GoPro as the police arrive and engage in a gunfight with the drug dealers. Jayden reconciles with Esteban while Simon and Slattery flee. They learn from Janelle that the next round of auditions are at Kovak's house and have been moved up to that day.
6	"Callback"	Tiffany Johnson	Roja Gashtili & Julia Lerman and Andrew Guest	January 27, 2026
Simon and Slattery drive to Kovak's mansion for the callback, joining other actors who are in the running to portray Wonder Man and Barnaby. After staying up all night trying to get the GoPro footage, Simon is exhausted. Kovak pairs up the actors and gives them improvisation exercises. While Slattery impresses the group, Simon falters by recreating a scene from the film Pretty Woman rather than using his own experiences and emotions. He later falls asleep and dreams that he uses his powers to kill one of the other actors after that actor calls Simon a freak. Simon confides in Slattery that he is nervous about exposing his powers, but Slattery explains that he is more than his powers and encourages him to show the emotions that he has been keeping inside. Simon and Slattery are paired together and give a performance that impresses Kovak, leading him to cast them both in the film. After Simon drives him home, Slattery is picked up by the DODC and berated by Cleary for taking too long. Slattery confirms that Simon has powers and asks Cleary to give him more time to collect evidence.
7	"Kathy Friedman"	Stella Meghie	Kira Talise and Andrew Guest	January 27, 2026
Filming for Wonder Man begins. Simon struggles to be personable with the crew and to communicate his thoughts on the script, but is helped by Slattery. Janelle informs the pair that The New York Times journalist Kathy Friedman is writing a profile on them, terrifying Simon who describes Friedman as a character assassin who could discover and reveal his secret. He becomes paranoid after learning that Friedman talked to Vivian, Martha, and Eric about him. Vivian reveals to Simon that she knows he has powers, but she did not say anything about them to Friedman. During Friedman's interview with Simon and Slattery, Simon is surprised to learn that Eric spoke highly of him. Friedman grills Slattery about his latest arrest and asks him what government deal he cut to avoid returning to prison, prompting him to walk off. Confronted by Simon, Slattery confesses the truth of his deal with the DODC to spy on Simon but promises that he will find a way to get out of it. Upset and overwhelmed, Simon goes to a Wonder Man soundstage and unleashes a large explosion that destroys the set.
8	"Yucca Valley"	Stella Meghie	Andrew Guest	January 27, 2026
Simon returns to his apartment assuming that he will be caught. Slattery calls him to apologize and says he has a solution: Slattery reprises his Mandarin persona and publicly claims responsibility for the explosion. Cleary knows that Slattery is just taking the blame for Simon, but goes along with it because the DODC needs more prisoners to justify their expensive prison in Yucca Valley, California. Following Slattery's arrest, Kovak insists they continue filming and tells Simon to use Slattery's betrayal for the scene where Wonder Man is betrayed by Barnaby. Wonder Man is finished, with Pantoliano taking over the role of Barnaby, and the film is a success. Eric says he is proud of Simon. Janelle tells Simon that he now has his pick of what role to take next and Simon decides to shadow a DODC guard under the guise of making a new film about him. This gives Simon access to the DODC prison, just as Cleary discovers that Simon's powers use ionic energy and proposes to his boss that Simon could be an asset. Simon uses his powers to break Slattery out of prison and fly away with him.

== Production ==
=== Development ===
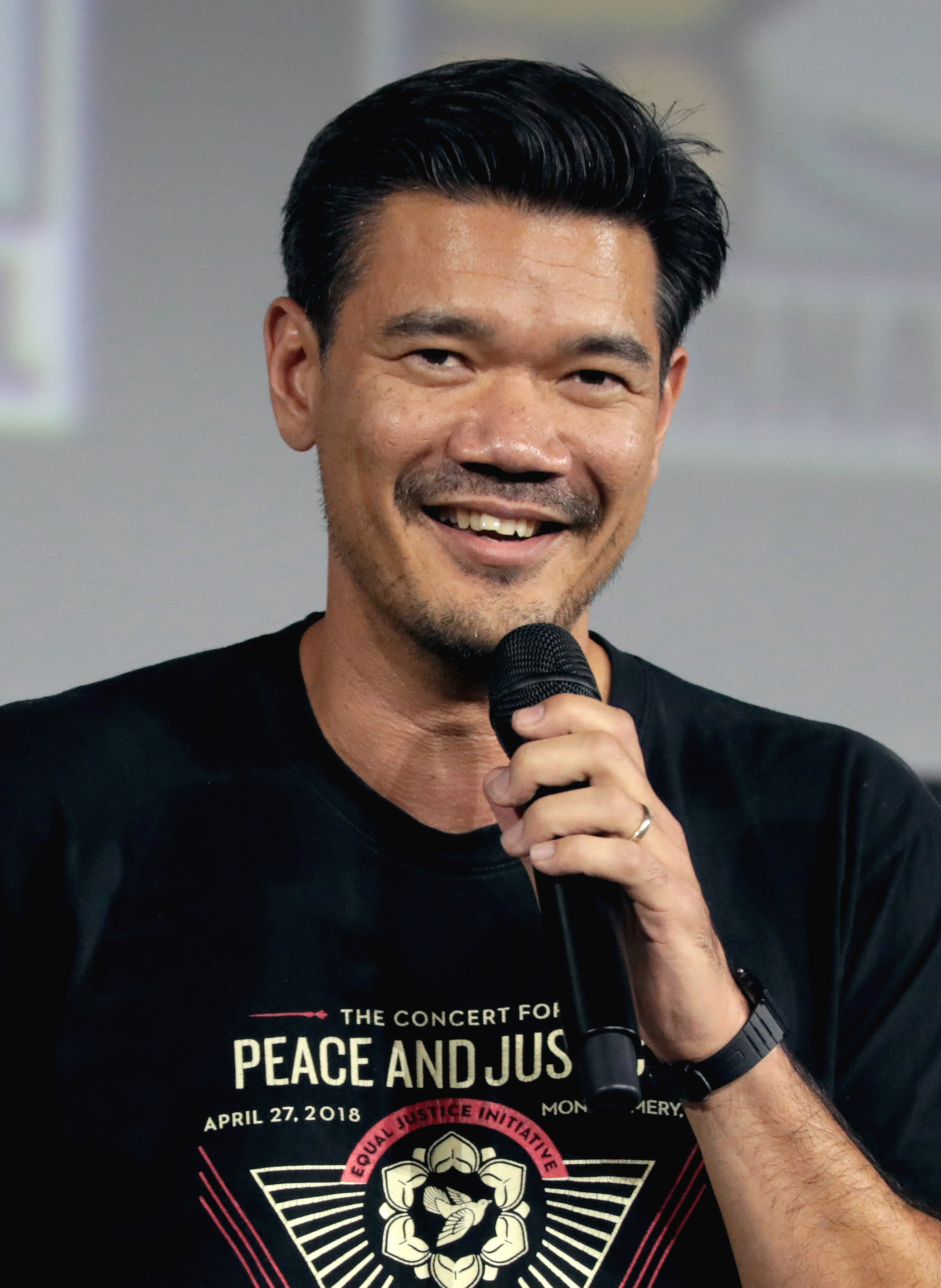
Director and co-creator Destin Daniel Cretton first began pursuing the idea of a series featuring the character Trevor Slattery while working on the film Shang-Chi and the Legend of the Ten Rings, before the project was merged with one featuring the character Wonder Man.

While working on the Marvel Cinematic Universe (MCU) film Shang-Chi and the Legend of the Ten Rings (2021), director Destin Daniel Cretton and Marvel Studios producer Jonathan Schwartz joked about making a television series centered on the character Trevor Slattery, an actor who was introduced posing as terrorist leader the Mandarin in the film Iron Man 3 (2013). Schwartz had the art department create a mock poster for a potential series called Trevor Goes to Hollywood, and Cretton was excited about pursuing the idea. By that time, Marvel Studios producers Stephen Broussard and Brian Gay were already developing a series set in Hollywood that would be centered on the Marvel Comics character Simon Williams / Wonder Man. Marvel Studios president Kevin Feige wanted to invert the character's comic book background, where he is a superpowered industrialist who happens to be an actor, instead making the character an actor who happens to have superpowers and believes they are an impediment to his acting. Brad Winderbaum, Marvel Studios' head of streaming, television, and animation, said both ideas followed an actor's journey in Hollywood and naturally merged into a "two-hander" series featuring Simon and Slattery. Feige and Cretton approached Slattery actor Ben Kingsley about the series soon after Shang-Chi premiered in August 2021.

By late 2021, Marvel Studios was meeting with head writers for the series. One of them was Andrew Guest, who had previously worked on the MCU series Hawkeye (2021) doing last-minute rewrites. His work on Hawkeye had impressed executives and he presented a pitch for Wonder Man inspired by the film Midnight Cowboy (1969), in which an unlikely friendship is developed between Simon and Slattery as they attempt to land roles in a remake of an in-universe Wonder Man film. Winderbaum said Guest's pitch had an earnest, uncynical view of the struggles that people in the arts go through, and Guest was surprised at how willing Marvel Studios was to make something that was not like anything else they had previously created. In December 2021, Cretton signed a multi-year deal with Marvel Studios and Onyx Collective to develop television projects for Disney+, with a comedy series known to already be in development. Cretton would produce the series through his newly created production company, Family Owned. This was in conjunction with Cretton returning to write and direct a sequel to Shang-Chi. In June 2022, Wonder Man was revealed to be in development with Guest attached as head writer. Cretton was expected to direct episodes. In February 2023, James Ponsoldt and Stella Meghie joined to direct multiple episodes each; Cretton directed the first two episodes, Ponsoldt directed the third and fourth, Tiffany Johnson directed the fifth and sixth, and Meghie directed the final two.

By October 2023, Marvel Studios shifted their creative philosophy to a more traditional television development process, moving away from head writers and beginning to hire dedicated showrunners for their series; Guest was ultimately named showrunner for Wonder Man. Marvel Studios formally announced the series in October 2024, when it was described as the studio's "worst-kept secret for quite some time" by Collider's Adam Blevins. The series was originally reported to consist of ten episodes, but Winderbaum later said it would just have eight. They range from approximately 20 to 40 minutes. Executive producers include Marvel Studios' Feige, Broussard, Schwartz, Louis D'Esposito, and Winderbaum, alongside Cretton and Guest.

=== Writing ===
Guest said Marvel Studios executives wanted the series to feel different from their other projects and never pressured him to include traditional superhero elements such as an origin story, visual effects-heavy action sequences, a major villain for the third act, or having the heroes save the world. In addition to Guest, the writers' room included Paul Welsh, Madeline Walter, Zeke Nicholson, Anayat Fakhraie, Roja Gashtili, Julia Lerman, and Kira Talise. Their mantra during the writing process was, "What if FX was going to do a Marvel show?" Guest described the series as a character study about two narcissists who learn to care about another person.

The series features a metafiction narrative set within the MCU, and references superhero fatigue. Winderbaum described it as a "love letter to Hollywood" and to the profession of acting. The creative team brought their own experiences from working in Hollywood and Cretton said they wanted to show the "non-glitz and glamor side" of Los Angeles, telling a story about a creative person with a dream who has to live in a small apartment and struggles to get by, something that they had all gone through. He described the series as weird and melancholy. Simon Williams actor Yahya Abdul-Mateen II acknowledged that there is a meta aspect to the series and said it is self aware, but added that it is also focused on a genuine story about friendship and the journey of an actor. He said the up-and-coming Simon and the experienced-but-jobless Slattery represent two different sides of being a professional actor. Abdul-Mateen personally related to "the actor who is unknown, who is talented and passionate and just needs a break". Guest said the writers worked to ensure that audiences outside of Hollywood would care about Simon's journey and feel that getting the Wonder Man role is like life or death for him. The series explores the realities of auditions, casting, directing, and writing, and some of the downsides of an acting career such as ego traps and fame. Kingsley felt this was done in an "entertaining, non-judgmental way". Abdul-Mateen heard from actors who appreciated that the series showed the real work done by professional actors.

The writers discussed potential explanations for Simon's powers, including making him a mutant, but decided that it was better not to explain them since they are something that happened to Simon which he has no interest in understanding and sees only as a hindrance. Guest compared this to the mutant-centric film X-Men (2000), which he saw as treating superpowers as psychological issues that align with life changes that the characters are going through. Marvel Studios wanted Simon's superpowers to be an impediment to his acting, which led to the introduction of the Doorman Clause which bans superpowered individuals from working in Hollywood. This follows other anti-superhero movements in the MCU such as the Sokovia Accords in the film Captain America: Civil War (2016) and the Anti-Vigilante Task Force (AVTF) in the series Daredevil: Born Again (2025–present). The clause is named after DeMarr Davis / Doorman, a minor character who was introduced in the 1980s West Coast Avengers comic book, a series which included Wonder Man for much of its run. Nicholson pitched that the character be used, and originally his role was meant to be a short joke about a character whose superpower is to be a door. As the writers discussed this, they came to see him as a more important character and eventually expanded his story to a full episode. Guest said Davis's story creates stakes for Simon, who has to hide his own powers, while Cretton said it represents core themes about being an actor and the struggle between contentment and pursuing your dreams.

=== Casting ===
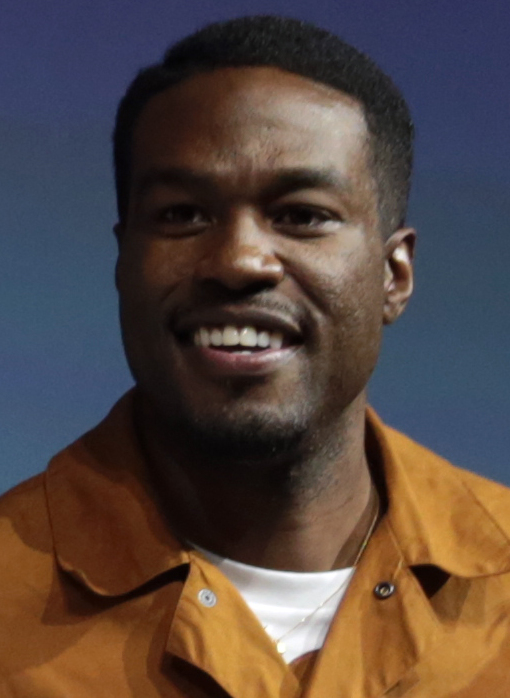
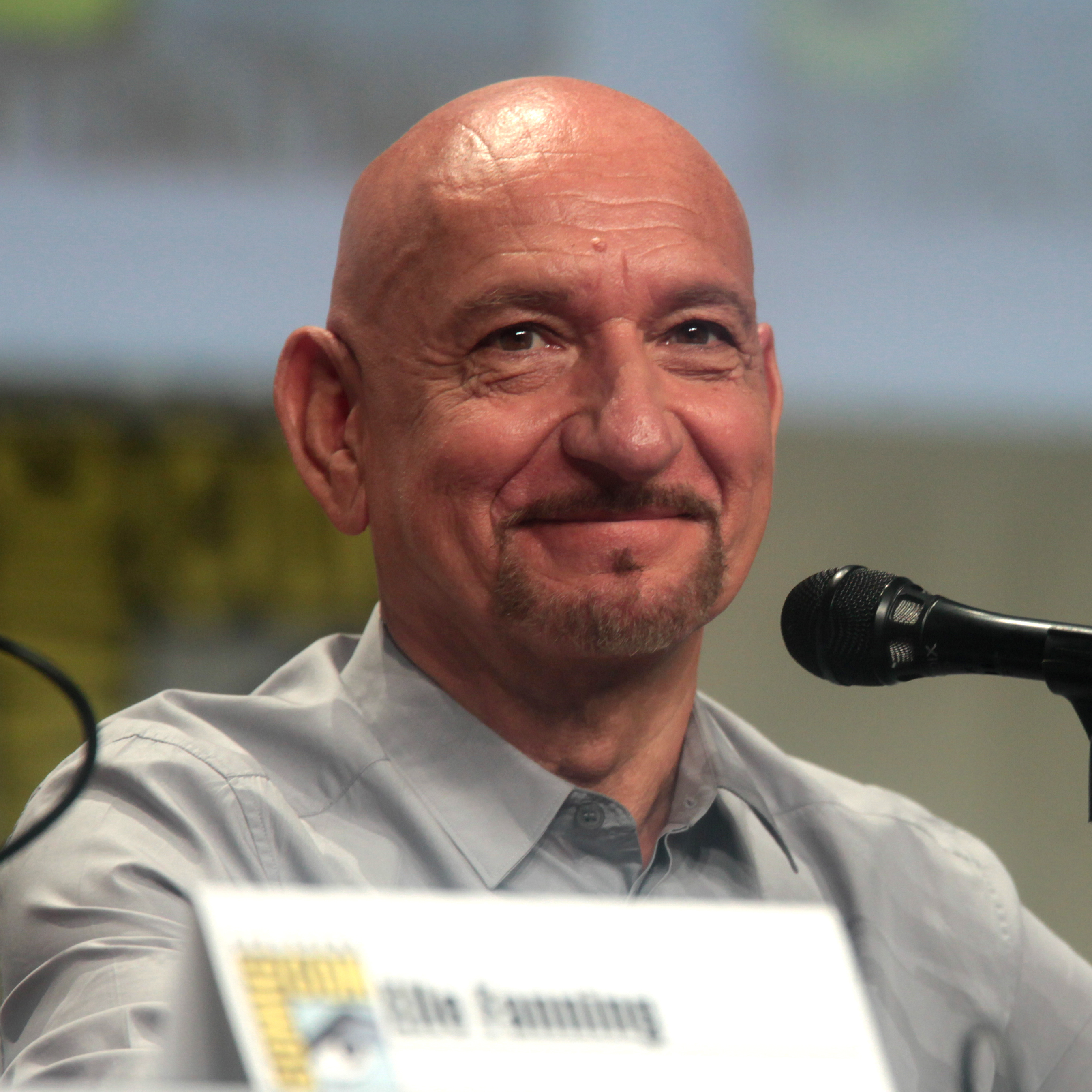
Yahya Abdul-Mateen II and Ben Kingsley star in the series, Abdul-Mateen in the lead role of Simon Williams and Kingsley reprising his MCU role as Trevor Slattery.

Ben Kingsley was revealed to be reprising his MCU role of Trevor Slattery in the series in August 2022. He said he was thrilled to explore the character more. In October, Yahya Abdul-Mateen II was cast as Simon Williams. Previously, Nathan Fillion appeared on movie posters as Simon Williams in a cut sequence from the MCU film Guardians of the Galaxy Vol. 2 (2017). Director James Gunn enjoyed Wonder Man in the comics and felt Fillion could portray a "sometimes douchey actor/superhero". Even though the posters were cut from the film, Gunn still considered them to be canon to the MCU. Fillion went on to voice the character in the M.O.D.O.K. (2021) animated series. Abdul-Mateen was hesitant to take on another comic book role after portraying Black Manta in the DC Comics-based films Aquaman (2018) and Aquaman and the Lost Kingdom (2023), and also portraying Doctor Manhattan in the DC Comics-based series Watchmen (2019). He signed on to Wonder Man because of Cretton's previous work and because of discussions he had with the director about the role and the direction of the series.

Lauren Glazier was cast in a supporting role in February 2023. The following month, Demetrius Grosse was cast as Simon's brother Eric Williams, and Ed Harris was reported to have been cast as agent Neal Saroyan. By the end of April, Josh Gad had reportedly joined the cast, which was confirmed in August 2024. Also revealed to have been cast in 2024 were Byron Bowers, Béchir Sylvain, and Manny McCord. In July 2025, Arian Moayed was revealed to be reprising his MCU role as P. Cleary in the series. Zlatko Burić was revealed in October to be part of the cast, portraying film director Von Kovak, alongside X Mayo, Olivia Thirlby, Joe Pantoliano, Phumzile Sitole, Jere Burns, and Simon Templeman. Bowers was revealed to be playing DeMarr Davis / Doorman in December. More actors and roles were revealed the next month: Juliette Ortega as Melanie, Sylvain and Shola Adewusi as Sanford and Martha Williams, respectively; Mayo as Janelle Jackson; Thirlby as Vivian; Larsen as Brent Willard; and Kameron J. Meadows as a young Simon. Charlotte Ross and Torrey Vogel were also revealed to be part of the cast in January 2026. Additional cast members include Jon A. Abrahams as Frank Preminger, and Lauren Weedman as Kathy Friedman.

Gad and Pantoliano portray themselves in the series, as do Mario Lopez and Ashley Greene. The roles that Gad and Pantoliano fill—a celebrity who befriends Davis and a rival for Slattery, respectively—were not originally written for specific actors. The production put together a list of experienced actors who may not be household names for the rival role and Pantoliano stood out to them as the first person to ask. After he agreed to join, the script was re-written to incorporate aspects of his real life. Similarly, Gad was the first person asked for the celebrity role and aspects of his real life were written into the Doorman episode. Gad agreed to star in the series on the condition that he could also play a different character that was not himself in a future MCU project, which Feige accepted. He originally signed on due to his character being killed off in a hilarious gruesome death scene that had his fictionalized version severed, but the creative team's "cooler heads" prevailed and his fictional version was spared, with him going as far to record lines of himself living inside DeMarr that were planned at one point to be played during the credits, though these went unused.

=== Design ===
Cindy Chao and Michele Yu, both from Los Angeles, were the production designers for the series. Part of their job was to work with the location team to identify and manage the more than 75 locations around Los Angeles that were needed for scenes and establishing shots. Joy Cretton, Destin's sister, was the costume designer. She wanted most of the costumes to be realistic, such as the denim jacket and jeans that Simon wears for most of the series. Slattery's costumes are more eclectic due to his history of collecting interesting things, but also represent his more "Zen" outlook following his experiences in Shang-Chi. The series features versions of several Wonder Man costumes from the comics: the lead character of the in-universe Wonder Man film wears a green jumpsuit with a red "W" and "M" chest emblem and a yellow jetpack, based on the costume that was introduced in West Coast Avengers vol. 2 #12 (September 1986); in the remake of the film, Simon wears a sleeveless black suit with a large red "W" symbol on the chest, based on the costume first featured in The Avengers vol. 1 #253 (December 1984); and at the premiere of the remake, Simon wears a red jacket over a black turtleneck which is reminiscent of the "safari jacket" costume that debuted in The Avengers vol. 1 #167 (January 1978). All three outfits include red sunglasses. Joy said there was debate over whether to also use the green and red look for Simon's costume in the remake, before they settled on using the black and red look. She felt the more "moody" appearance was appropriate for Simon's character. Doorman wears a comics-accurate black and white mask, while the rest of his outfit is all black and features a buckle-covered leather trench coat and a silver chain.

=== Filming ===
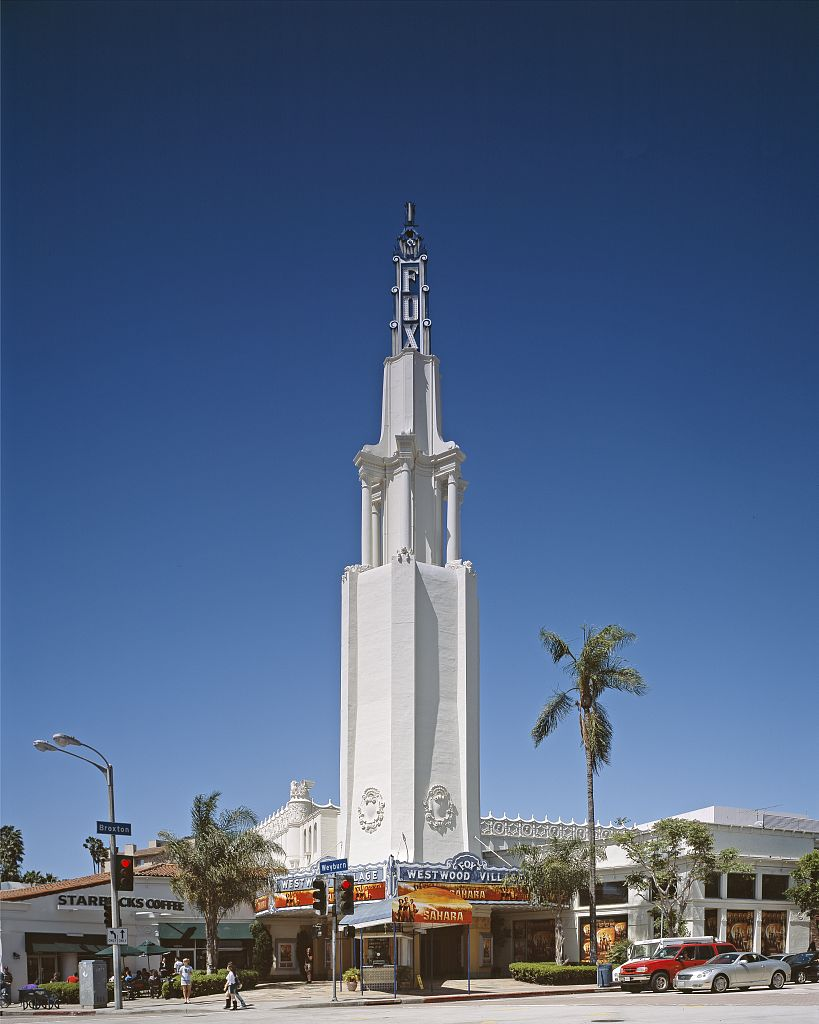
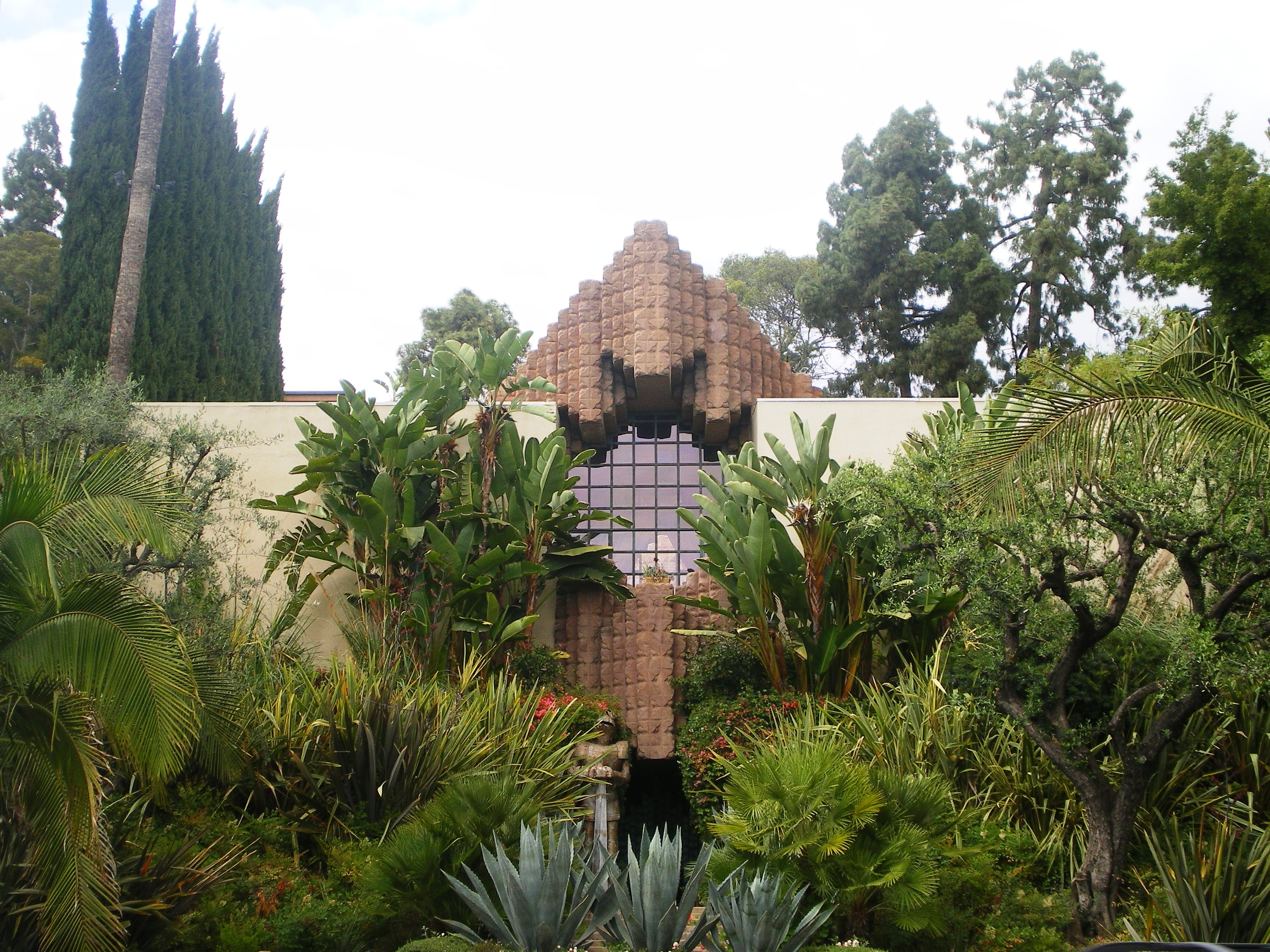
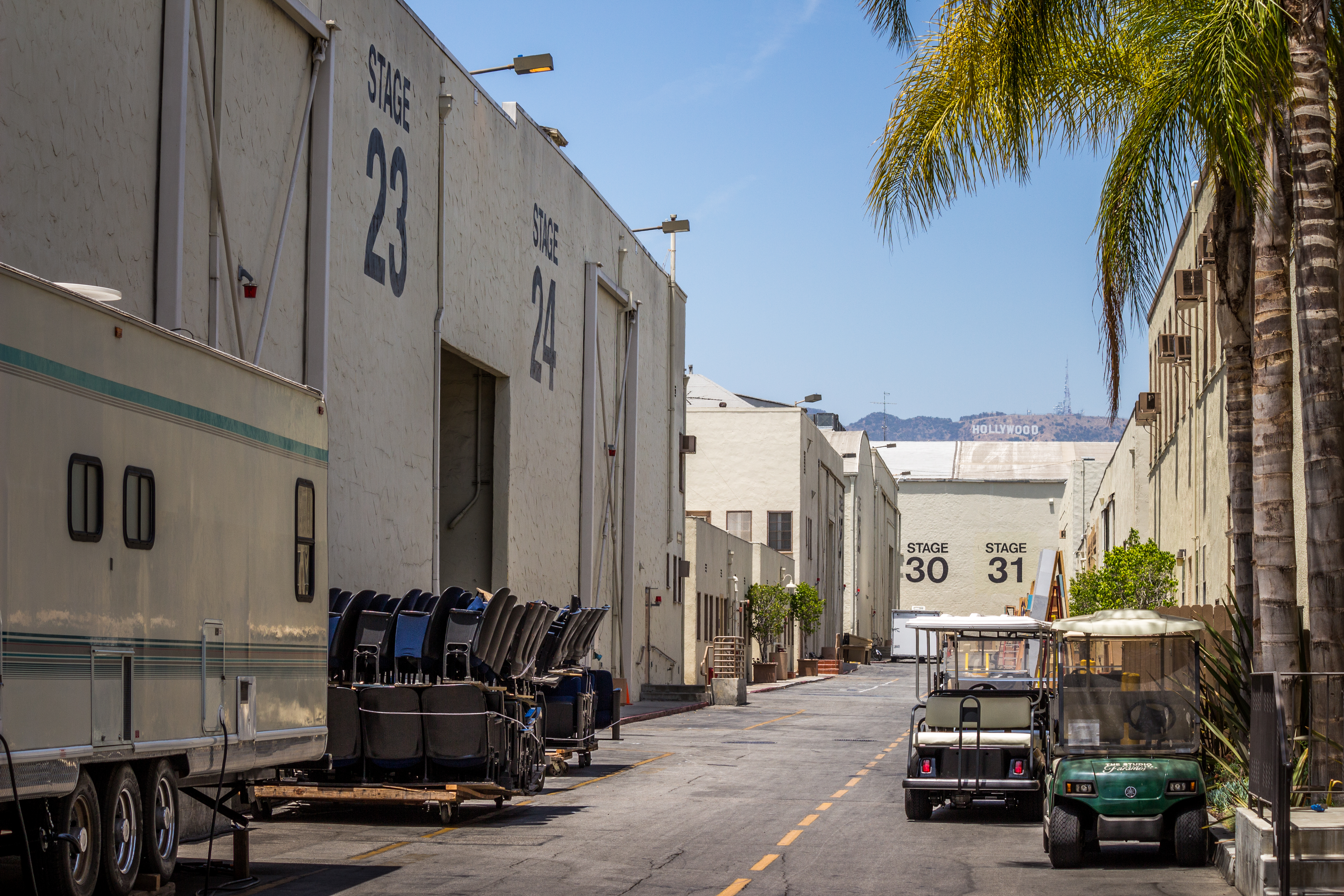
Location filming took place around Los Angeles, including at the Fox Village Theater, John Sowden House, and Paramount Studios.

Principal photography began by April 5, 2023, in Los Angeles, under the working title Callback, with Cretton, Ponsoldt, Johnson, and Meghie directing. Brett Pawlak was the cinematographer for Cretton and Johnson's episodes and Armando Salas was the cinematographer for Ponsoldt and Meghie's episodes. Filming was initially expected to conclude by early August. Filming locations in Los Angeles included the Highland Theatre in Highland Park, where Simon and Slattery meet during a screening of Midnight Cowboy; the Eagle Theater in Eagle Rock, which was dressed to be accurate to the 1990s for a flashback where Simon sees the original Wonder Man with his father; the Fox Village Theater in Westwood where the remake of Wonder Man premieres; John Sowden House in Los Feliz, which is used as a filming location for the Wonder Man remake; the Talmadge, an historic building in Koreatown where Slattery's apartment is located; and the studio sets and backlots at Radford Studio Center and Paramount Studios. Ponsoldt wanted the Doorman episode, which was filmed in black-and-white, to feel like an "old Hollywood fairytale" inspired by the films of Frank Capra, Howard Hawks, and Billy Wilder.

When the 2023 Writers Guild of America strike began in May 2023, it was not expected to impact the production which was said to be continuing during the strike. It was reported that Marvel Studios was planning to shoot what they could during principal photography and make any necessary writing adjustments during the series' already scheduled reshoots. Filming was taking place around Hollywood Boulevard in Los Angeles on May 4 when picketers participating in the strike attempted to shut down production. Picketers stopped production when it returned to film at Radford Studio Center on May 8. Production was shut down by the end of the month with plans to resume after the WGA strike and the subsequent 2023 SAG-AFTRA strike concluded. Approximately half of the series was filmed before the shutdown. In October 2023, Joanna Robinson, co-author of the book MCU: The Reign of Marvel Studios, reported that Marvel Studios was considering not moving forward with the series, despite already filming some material. Guest explained that Marvel Studios used the production pause during the strikes to re-evaluate and provide notes on the series for when production resumed. Cretton added that it was possible the series could have become a tax write-off for Disney at that point, something that was happening at other studios with other unreleased projects, but Marvel Studios executives fought to ensure filming could be completed. Following the conclusion of the SAG-AFTRA strike in November and Cretton's exit from directing the planned film Avengers: The Kang Dynasty to focus on his commitments to other MCU projects, including Wonder Man, filming was set to resume around the end of the month after Thanksgiving.

Filming resumed in Los Angeles by early January 2024. J.C. "Spike" Osorio, a lighting technician, died during production work on set at Radford Studio Center on February 6, after falling from the rafters. Disney and Radford were respectively fined $36,000 and $45,000 after the California Division of Occupational Safety and Health concluded their investigation into Osorio's death and found that deterioration in the conditions of the catwalk Osorio was standing on led to his death. The majority of filming was completed by early February, with pick-ups planned during the following weeks. Filming officially wrapped in March. Winderbaum said Wonder Man had "one of the lowest, if not the lowest" budget of Marvel Studios' television series to date.

=== Post-production ===
Winderbaum confirmed that the series was being edited by March 2024. Gina Sansom joined the series as an editor after working with Cretton on the series American Born Chinese (2023). Nena Erb and Cassie Dixon also edited the series. John Haley was the visual effects supervisor. Guest said the series was completed and ready to be released around September 2024.

=== Music ===
Joel P. West, a frequent collaborator of Cretton's who worked on Shang-Chi, composed the score for the series. A soundtrack album featuring West's score was released on January 30, 2026. West created a club remix of the song "In Summer", which Gad sings as Olaf in the film Frozen (2013), to be played during a scene in the Doorman episode where Gad serves as the DJ of the Wilcox Club.

Wonder Man (Original Soundtrack)
No.	Title	Length
1.	"Simon Williams to Set"	1:51
2.	"Congratulations"	1:26
3.	"Another Day in Paradise"	1:18
4.	"Make Mum Proud"	0:58
5.	"Option Two"	1:34
6.	"Simon Williams, Kathy Friedman"	1:40
7.	"The Big Screen"	1:00
8.	"The Fire"	0:55
9.	"Simon Williams Hits the Road"	1:00
10.	"A Friend"	1:11
11.	"Monologues"	1:10
12.	"Previously on Wonder Man"	1:29
13.	"Simon's Secret"	1:00
14.	"Doorman Overture"	0:41
15.	"Goo"	1:17
16.	"Doorman in a Jam"	1:43
17.	"Actors"	1:18
18.	"Making Headlines"	0:46
19.	"Doorman's Nightmare"	2:46
20.	"The Doorman Clause"	1:15
21.	"Is That Him?"	1:17
22.	"Traffic"	1:40
23.	"We Gotta Go!"	1:55
24.	"The Role of a Lifetime"	0:35
25.	"Simon Williams, Shoes Off"	2:00
26.	"Prison of Opulence"	0:54
27.	"No, Maybe"	0:55
28.	"This Isn't Working"	0:36
29.	"Off Off Off Broadway"	1:56
30.	"Less Alone"	0:47
31.	"The World Is Going to Fall in Love with You"	0:46
32.	"Simon Williams Arrives"	1:55
33.	"A Sensitive Subject"	1:08
34.	"A Normal Day for Simon Williams"	1:16
35.	"Hell of a Performance"	0:37
36.	"I Did That"	0:43
37.	"Simon Williams, Wonder Man"	0:49
38.	"We're Not Going That Way"	2:04
39.	"Simon Williams' Dream"	1:55
Total length:		41:34

== Marketing ==
The first footage from the series was included in a video that was released by Disney+ in October 2024, announcing the release schedule for Marvel Television and Marvel Animation projects through the end of 2025. More footage, introduced by Kingsley, was shown during Disney's upfront presentation in May 2025. In July 2025, Abdul-Mateen appeared in character as Simon at the red carpet premiere for the MCU film The Fantastic Four: First Steps. While in character as Simon, he called Wonder Man a "dream part" for him, having enjoyed the original 1980s film when he was younger. George Marston from Total Film felt Simon referencing an earlier fictional Wonder Man project that existed within the MCU was a way for Marvel Studios to reconcile the reference to Wonder Man in the deleted scene of Vol. 2. Ryan Stankevich, the marketing brand lead for Marvel and Disney, called this appearance a "tone setting exercise" for the rest of the series' meta approach to its marketing.

Abdul-Mateen and Kingsley appeared at New York Comic Con in October 2025 to promote the series and premiere the first trailer for the series. A teaser poster was also released that featured the cover of The Hollywood Reporter because it was an "iconic industry outlet" and helped "lean into the meta nature of the campaign and lean into the Hollywood nature of everything", giving the series authenticity. The following month, an additional clip was released. Germain Lussier at Gizmodo called the clip similar to the trailer shown at New York Comic Con with the added element of revealing that Simon has superpowers. He said until this point, all of the footage presented the series as Simon just being a struggling actor trying to get his big shot, making Wonder Man seem like Marvel's version of the television series Entourage (2004–2011). Adding in the fact that Simon has powers and is trying to hide them to land a part in the fictional Wonder Man, created "a fun twist in the story and will certainly make for a nice blend of humor and action". Lussier also felt the tease of Simon's powers indicated that they may differ from the character's powers in the comics. Polygon's Michael McWhertor also felt the clip began similarly to the New York Comic Con trailer, only for it to eventually reveal "what the show is really about" with the tease of Simon's powers. More footage was shown at CCXP in December.

External videos
- YouTube videos from Marvel Entertainment's channel
- The Slattery Method by Trevor Slattery presents the faux promotional video for Slattery's acting lessons master class, "The Slattery Method"
- Wonder Man's Trevor Slattery Loses it During Ben Mankiewicz Interview presents the fictional podcast Bad Actors interview between host Ben Mankiewicz and Slattery
- Wonder Man's Simon Williams and Trevor Slattery | Actors Unscripted presents the fictional Actors Unscripted interview between Simon and Slattery

From the October through December 2025, various fictional promotional videos were released for the series. These included Von Kovak announcing the development of the Wonder Man remake film in an interview with the popular X (Twitter) film account Discussing Film, which had over 2 million views. A faux promotional video for Slattery's acting lessons master class, "The Slattery Method", was released along with the creation of a promotional hotline telephone number that could be called or texted to sign up for updates on Wonder Man; Kingsley recorded multiple-weeks worth of content for the hotline. George Marston from Total Film called the promotional video "one of the funnier, more effective promo videos we've seen from the MCU lately". Also released was a video for the fictional podcast Bad Actors hosted by Ben Mankiewicz, for his interview with Slattery to promote his appearance in the Wonder Man reboot film. Slattery leaves shortly into the interview when Mankiewicz continues to question him about taking the role of the Mandarin, which was depicted in Iron Man 3. The video Actors Unscripted featuring a conversation between Simon and Slattery was also released, parodying Variety's Actors on Actors. Throughout the interview, chicken wings, puppies, and a lie detector are brought out for the interview, acting as parodies to the talk show Hot Ones, BuzzFeed's puppy interviews, and Vanity Fair's lie detector test series, respectively. The escalating ridiculousness causes Simon to leave the interview. The promotional videos with Kingsley and Abdul-Mateen were all recorded in a single day, a first Marvel's marketing.

Another trailer was released on January 1, 2026, New Year's Day, which Gizmodo's Justin Carter said served as a reminder of the series's release later that month after it was pushed back from its December 2025 premiere. He noted that earlier trailers had "played coy" about Simon's powers and that this teaser provided a "deeper look" at them while teasing his ionic powers. Jennifer Ouellette at Ars Technica said the new trailer repurposed some of the earlier footage released and highlighted a new scene featuring Simon's powers in "explosive fashion" during a stressful audition. Kofi Outlaw from ComicBook.com noticed the "tea kettle format" of the trailer, showing the building pressure for Simon as he is trying to audition for Wonder Man, which brings up trauma from his past that leads to his powers "exploding out". Writing for Den of Geek, Joe George compared the trailer to the films of director Wes Anderson. He felt that the footage downplayed aspects of the superhero genre, such as depicting Simon's superpowers and references to the wider MCU, in response to superhero fatigue, but questioned whether Marvel Studios could fully satirize that genre. Following the trailer's release, additional marketing centered on the Doorman Clause was released. Carter felt these ads did "a good job of further fleshing out the MCU and through an interesting lens", exploring how "the upper class" within the MCU looks at superpowered individuals. Multiple commentators opined that the Doorman Clause could be a stepping stone towards the introduction of mutants and the X-Men in the MCU.

Additional advertisements were shown during prominent sporting events in the lead up to the series' release, including college football bowl games, NBA and NHL games, and Premier League matches. The marketing team also partnered with a Hollywood bus tour company to create a themed bus around the series to bring a group influencers to the various Los Angeles filming locations used in the series, before culminating in the group attending the series' launch event. After Wonder Man released, the marketing team continued additional promotion of the series, including a "cheeky" reference to Gad going missing and the release of a "vintage" trailer for the original Wonder Man film. Cheryl Eddy at Gizmodo said the original Wonder Man trailer had "delicious cornball vibes" and helped highlight why this in-universe film "was the perfect fodder for the series' witty exploration of Hollywood's superhero-industrial complex". She said the trailer also helped reinforce why Simon became so enamored with the film as a child and affected him to pursue the leading role in the remake. Marvel also released a short making-of video for the filming of the 1980s scenes in the series.

In April 2026, Slattery's acting lessons from "The Slattery Method" were made available on the online interactive radio experience for the Hulu series Paradise (2025–present).

== Release ==
Wonder Man was released in its entirety on Disney+ on January 27, 2026, and consists of eight episodes. A launch event was held at the TCL Chinese Theatre in Hollywood on January 22. The series is part of Phase Six of the MCU, and was released under the "Marvel Spotlight" banner, indicating that it features a more grounded, character-driven story with less impact on the larger MCU narrative.

The series was initially expected to premiere during the 2023–24 television season, but its release date was unclear by September 2023, given filming had not yet been completed amid the ongoing WGA and SAG-AFTRA strikes. The series was ready for release around September 2024, but was delayed further following Disney's directive for Marvel Studios to decrease content output; in October 2024 it was scheduled for release in December 2025. Feige did not enjoy delaying the series, saying he disliked having "things sit on shelves" ready to go. He added that two similar series, HBO's The Franchise (2024) and Apple TV+'s The Studio (2025–present), had been released since Wonder Man was delayed and it would now look like Marvel Studios was "following a trend, instead of leading it". Winderbaum felt Wonder Man was differentiated from The Studio due to its focus on acting rather than the wider Hollywood studio system. Wonder Man was later shifted to a January 2026 release because Marvel Studios did not want the series to be competing with holiday programming.

On March 3, 2026, Marvel Studios released the first episode for free on its YouTube channel.

== Reception ==
=== Viewership ===
Streaming analytics firm FlixPatrol, which monitors daily updated VOD charts and streaming ratings worldwide, reported that following its debut on Disney+, Wonder Man ranked No. 1 on the service's "Top Series" chart in the United States. The series also placed No. 1 in Canada, Belgium, Australia, Albania, Austria, Bulgaria, Denmark, Croatia, Japan, Latvia, Sweden, New Zealand, Norway, Romania, Serbia, and Switzerland, and No. 2 in San Marino and Italy. Disney+, which calculates its "Top 10" list based on daily views for episodes and films as well as the popularity of newly released titles, subsequently announced that Wonder Man ranked No. 1 in 69 countries during its release week.

Nielsen Media Research, which records streaming viewership on certain U.S. television screens, reported that Wonder Man generated 618 million minutes of viewing time from January 26 to February 1, ranking as the eighth most-streamed original series during that week. Luminate, which measures streaming performance in the United States using viewership data, audience engagement metrics, and content reach across multiple platforms, announced that the series generated 1.7 billion minutes of watch time and 6.5 million views during its first twelve weeks of release. Luminate subsequently reported that Wonder Man generated 7 million views and was streamed for 1.9 billion minutes during the first half of 2026.

=== Critical response ===
On review aggregator website Rotten Tomatoes, 91% of 112 critics gave Wonder Man a positive review. The website's critics consensus reads, "Yahya Abdul-Mateen II is Wonder Man, turning in a sly performance alongside an equally wonderful Ben Kingsley in this low-stakes superhero fare that boasts high-hearted personal drama as its winning factor." Metacritic, which uses a weighted average, assigned a score of 75 out of 100 based on 31 critics, indicating "generally favorable" reviews.

=== Accolades ===
By late March 2026, Marvel was planning to capitalize on the positive responses to the series with an awards campaign. It was to be submitted in categories for comedy series.

Accolades received by Wonder Man
Award	Date of ceremony	Category	Recipient	Result	Ref.
Astra TV Awards	August 16, 2026	Best Actor in a Comedy Series	Yahya Abdul-Mateen II	Nominated	
Critics' Choice Super Awards	August 6, 2026	Best Superhero Series, Limited Series or Made-for-TV Movie	Wonder Man	Nominated	
Critics' Choice Super Awards	August 6, 2026	Best Actor in a Superhero Series, Limited Series or Made-for-TV Movie	Yahya Abdul-Mateen II	Nominated	
Dorian TV Awards	2026	Best TV Performance — Comedy	Yahya Abdul-Mateen II	Nominated	
Primetime Emmy Awards	September 14, 2026	Outstanding Lead Actor in a Comedy Series	Yahya Abdul-Mateen II	Nominated	

== Future ==
Because Wonder Man was developed prior to Marvel Studios' late 2023 shift towards multi-season television series, the studio was taking a "wait-and-see approach" by May 2025 regarding whether it would get a second season. Winderbaum said the series was caught in the middle of their creative overhaul and was not originally planned to have additional seasons. Despite feeling that it "really stands on its own as a beautiful piece", he said the studio was now open to more if there was a strong audience response. In January 2026, Guest said he had thoughts on what a second season could be. Winderbaum said the series would only be renewed if it had "big, big [viewership] numbers". In March, the series was renewed for a second season. Guest and Cretton were confirmed to be returning as showrunner and director, respectively, and both Abdul-Mateen II and Kingsley were confirmed to be reprising their roles. A month later, Guest said writing for the second season was in the "early stages" and they were trying to maintain the first season's tone. He said the second season would continue to focus on the relationship between Simon and Slattery as they navigate Hollywood and the entertainment industry. In June, Gad said the creative team were planning to bring him back for the second season.

In July 2026, Cretton said he hoped filming for the season would begin that year. However, the series was canceled shortly after his comments. Guest explained that Disney and Marvel decided the season "didn't make sense for them", and the cancelation was not a marketing stunt or related to the project shifting to be a feature film instead. Before the cancelation, those involved had signed contracts and were scheduling production dates, Guest had written the first episode and an outline for the season, and the writers' room was scheduled to begin in August 2026 for a planned filming start in early 2027. Joe Otterson at Variety reported that the writers had been released to pursue other opportunities. There was potential for Abdul-Mateen and Kingsley to reprise their roles in future MCU projects. Cretton said he was unsure why the series was canceled and whether the business of streaming played a factor. He was open to directing a Wonder Man film in the future. Abdul-Mateen was told that the cancellation was related to viewership numbers, but was not told what those numbers were. He had avoided discussing plans for the second season with the writers, but had his own ideas for where he wanted Willams's story to go in the season, and was interested in exploring what happens after someone gets everything they have always wanted. The cancellation was reportedly part of a larger strategy for Marvel to cut back on producing live-action series. Winderbaum said he and Marvel had "fought" for the series to continue, calling the situation "complicated" and hoping there was a way Marvel could revisit the series and characters in the future.
