= Afflicted (film) =

2013 film directed by Derek Lee and Clif Prowse

- Directed by: Derek Lee; Clif Prowse
- Written by: Derek Lee; Clif Prowse
- Produced by: Chris Ferguson; Zach Lipovsky
- Starring: Clif Prowse; Derek Lee
- Cinematography: Norm Li
- Edited by: Greg Ng
- Music by: Edo Van Breemen
- Production companies: Téléfilm Canada; Automatik Entertainment; Oddfellows Entertainment
- Distributed by: Entertainment One
- Release dates: September 9, 2013 (Toronto International Film Festival); April 4, 2014 (US/Canada)
- Running time: 85 minutes
- Country: Canada
- Language: English
- Budget: $318,000
- Box office: $121,200

Afflicted is a 2013 Canadian found footage horror film written and directed by Derek Lee and Clif Prowse. Their feature film directorial debut, it had its world premiere on September 9, 2013, at the Toronto International Film Festival, where it won a special jury citation for Best Canadian First Feature Film. Lee and Prowse star as two friends whose goal to film themselves traveling the world is cut short when one of them contracts a mysterious disease.

Afflicted received a theatrical and video-on-demand release on April 4, 2014.

== Plot ==
Childhood friends Clif and Derek decide to venture around the world and film their travel web series Ends of the Earth. The trip is Derek's last wish, as he has an AVM (cerebral arteriovenous malformation), which could cause his death at any moment.

Clif and Derek stop in Barcelona to meet with old friends Edo and Zach. During their stay, Derek picks up a woman named Audrey. Later that night, the other three burst into Derek's hotel room as a prank. They discover him bleeding and semiconscious, and no sign of Audrey. Though Derek does not remember anything about the attack, they assume that Audrey planned to rob him. Clif and Derek part ways with Edo and Zach.

Arriving in Italy, Derek passes out and sleeps for an entire day. The next afternoon, he and Clif visit a restaurant, where Derek projectile vomits his meal. At a vineyard, Derek has an extreme reaction to sunlight and flees indoors covered in burns. At the hotel, Clif attempts to calm Derek down, only for Derek to punch through a stone wall with his bare hands.

Over the next days, Derek displays superhuman strength, speed, and agility. However, he insists that there is nothing wrong with him. Derek grows sicker due to being unable to eat and agrees to go to a hospital.

En route, the two are almost hit by a car. Derek fights with the angry driver and passenger, overpowering them both. He licks their blood off his hand. Clif deduces that Derek contracted vampirism. Research online proves unhelpful.

Derek tries drinking blood obtained from a butcher, then kills and drinks the blood of a piglet, only to vomit on both occasions. He and Clif attempt to rob an ambulance for human blood, but are unsuccessful. Derek enters a catatonic state. Clif decides to cut his own arm to give Derek blood, but Derek escapes.

Clif searches for and is killed by the now completely inhuman Derek. Derek regains his senses, realizes what he has done and shoots himself in the head with a shotgun. However, his head heals with only slight scarring. Interpol agents arrive to arrest Derek, forcing him to escape with Clif's camera bag.

Derek hides in an abandoned warehouse in Paris. Reviewing the footage of his meeting with Audrey, he realizes that her phone might be at the hotel where she bit him. He retrieves the phone and texts every number in the contact list, to lure someone to him. He gets a reply from someone named Maurice offering to meet in person. Derek hides and tails Maurice to a squalid building.

In Maurice's apartment, Derek finds a bloodstained saw and an old black and white photograph of Audrey. Maurice attacks Derek from behind, but is overpowered and restrained. Maurice knows Audrey and is bitter that she left him human but turned Derek into a vampire. Derek sets up a live-stream of Maurice tied up to lure Audrey. GIGN storms the apartment, and Derek is shot to near-death before entering a frenzied state. He slaughters the whole squad and escapes.

Audrey visits the abandoned building and attacks Derek. She reveals that there is no cure for vampirism and that she would have cured herself if there were one. In the ensuing fight, Audrey overpowers Derek and urges him to feed every four to five days, lest he become inhuman again and turn into something that kills indiscriminately and daily. Audrey chose Derek because he was dying and she thought she was being kind.

Derek posts a final entry online, explaining that he can never contact his family again. Later, he films himself feeding on a man who has child pornography on his phone.

A teenage boy and two teenage girls later sneak into a swimming pool in Italy and are attacked. The boy gets away and finds the bloodied corpse of one of the girls. Clif, now also a vampire, attacks him.

== Cast ==
- Derek Lee as Derek
- Clif Prowse as Clif
- Michael Gill as Michael Gill
- Jason Lee as Jason
- Gary Redekop as Gary
- Lily Py Lee as Derek's Mom
- Zach Gray as Zachary
- Edo Van Breemen as Edo
- Benjamin Zeitoun as Maurice
- Baya Rehaz as Audrey
- Ian Hanlin as Jeff

== Production ==
Filming took place in Barcelona, Paris, Italy, and Vancouver on a budget of $318,000. Funding was raised through a small grant and through Prowse and Lee's family and friends. Afflicted was their first feature-length film, as the two had previous only created short films together. The movie's original concept was initially planned to be a web series akin to Lonelygirl15 or Marble Hornets, where the two would make posts and upload videos that would seem ordinary but grow more bizarre over time. Of the concept, Prowse commented that "You'd eventually have all these gaps because eventually the characters would stop posting and then the feature film would be this skeleton key that would click at the very end that you'd present." They chose to make Derek's disease vampirism, as they felt that vampires are usually in "very stylized, cinematic, often melodramatic, and romanticized films" and were not traditionally filmed otherwise.

As the two were not familiar with filming in the found footage genre, Prowse and Lee found the filming challenging and commented that they had a lot of respect for the crews of films such as The Blair Witch Project and Paranormal Activity. They commented that their choice to star as the film's protagonists helped make the process easier, as it allowed them more freedom to shoot and re-shoot scenes. Lee commented that his role of "Derek" was very physically taxing due to the weather in Italy and the demands of the role.

== Promotion ==
The film's trailer is notable for showing a selection of the characters' "travelogue" scenes in reverse order: Entry 206, Entry 185, Entry 163, Entry 151, and so on, each scene suggesting the horrors that are growing throughout the story. Germain Lussier of www.slashfilm.com wrote, "The Afflicted trailer might be one of the best "Hollywood" has released in a long time. Unlike traditional trailers, which are presented linearly, this one starts at the beginning, jumps to the end and works backward, showing how two friends' trip around the world goes horribly, horribly wrong."

== Reception ==
Critical reviews for Afflicted have been mostly positive and as of October 14, 2019, the movie holds a rating of 83% on Rotten Tomatoes based on 30 reviews, with an average score of 6.70/10. The site's consensus reads: "It isn't without its share of clichés, but Afflicted proves there's still life in the found-footage horror genre". Metacritic, which uses a weighted average, assigned the film a score of 56 out of 100, based on 6 critics, indicating "mixed or average" reviews.

=== Box office ===
For its opening weekend, Afflicted opened in 44 theatres, and grossed $68,300, for an average of $1,552 per theatre. As of April 13, 2014, Afflicted has grossed $102,851.

=== Awards ===
- Best Canadian First Feature Film - Special Jury Citation at the Toronto International Film Festival (2013, won)
- Maria Award for Best Special Effects at the Sitges - Catalan International Film Festival (2013, won)
- Maria Award for Best Motion Picture at the Sitges - Catalan International Film Festival (2013, nominated)
- Best Director - Horror Features at the Austin Fantastic Fest (2013, won)
- Best Picture - Horror Features at the Austin Fantastic Fest (2013, won)
- Best Screenplay - Horror Features at the Austin Fantastic Fest (2013, won)
