= Austin Film Critics Association Awards 2013 =

Annual US film awards ceremony

9th AFCA Awards

Best Film:
Her

The 9th Austin Film Critics Association Awards, honoring the best in filmmaking for 2013, were announced on December 17, 2013.

== Top 10 Films ==
1. Her
2. 12 Years a Slave
3. Gravity
4. The Wolf of Wall Street
5. Inside Llewyn Davis
6. Short Term 12
7. Mud
8. Before Midnight
9. Dallas Buyers Club
10. Captain Phillips

== Winners ==
- Best Film:
  - Her
- Best Director:
  - Alfonso Cuarón – Gravity
- Best Actor:
  - Chiwetel Ejiofor – 12 Years a Slave
- Best Actress:
  - Brie Larson – Short Term 12
- Best Supporting Actor:
  - Jared Leto – Dallas Buyers Club
- Best Supporting Actress:
  - Lupita Nyong'o – 12 Years a Slave
- Best Original Screenplay:
  - Her – Spike Jonze
- Best Adapted Screenplay:
  - 12 Years a Slave – John Ridley
- Best Cinematography:
  - Gravity – Emmanuel Lubezki
- Best Original Score:
  - Her – Arcade Fire
- Best Foreign Language Film:
  - Blue Is the Warmest Colour • France
- Best Documentary:
  - The Act of Killing
- Best Animated Feature:
  - Frozen
- Best First Film:
  - Ryan Coogler – Fruitvale Station
- Breakthrough Artist Award:
  - Brie Larson – Short Term 12
- Austin Film Award:
  - Before Midnight – Richard Linklater
- Special Honorary Award:
  - Scarlett Johansson for her outstanding voice performance in Her
