= Short Term 12 =

2013 film by Destin Daniel Cretton

- Theatrical release poster
- Directed by: Destin Daniel Cretton
- Written by: Destin Daniel Cretton
- Based on: Short Term 12 (short) by Destin Daniel Cretton
- Produced by: Maren Olson; Asher Goldstein; Joshua Astrachan; Ron Najor
- Starring: Brie Larson; John Gallagher, Jr.; Kaitlyn Dever; Rami Malek; LaKeith Stanfield; Kevin Hernandez; Melora Walters; Stephanie Beatriz
- Cinematography: Brett Pawlak
- Edited by: Nat Sanders
- Music by: Joel P. West
- Production companies: Demarest Films; Traction Media; Animal Kingdom
- Distributed by: Cinedigm
- Release dates: March 10, 2013 (SXSW); August 23, 2013 (United States)
- Running time: 96 minutes
- Country: United States
- Language: English
- Budget: $400,000
- Box office: $2.3 million

Short Term 12 is a 2013 American independent drama film written and directed by Destin Daniel Cretton. It is adapted from Cretton's short film of the same name, produced in 2009. The film stars Brie Larson as Grace Howard, a young supervisor of a group home for troubled teenagers. The film was the first leading performance of Larson's career.

Cretton based Short Term 12 on his own experience working in a group facility for teenagers. He wrote and produced a short film exploring this and later adapted it into a feature-length screenplay. While Larson and John Gallagher, Jr. won their roles after auditioning through Skype, most of the children featured in the film were cast through open casting calls. Filming took place over twenty days in Los Angeles, California in September 2012.

Short Term 12 premiered on March 10, 2013, at South by Southwest, where it won the Grand Jury and Audience Awards for a Narrative Feature. The film was theatrically released in the United States on August 23, 2013, by Cinedigm. Critics praised its realism and intimacy, and especially Larson's performance and Cretton's screenplay and direction. The film is considered one of the best of 2013, appearing on several critics' year-end lists. It was listed by the National Board of Review as one of the Top Ten Independent Films of 2013. It earned three Independent Spirit Award nominations, including Best Female Lead for Larson.

== Plot ==
Grace Howard is the young supervisor of Short Term 12, a group home for troubled teenagers. She lives with her long-term boyfriend and coworker, Mason, but finds it difficult to open up to him emotionally. When Grace finds out she is pregnant, she schedules an appointment for an abortion; she eventually tells Mason about the pregnancy; he is overjoyed. She does not tell him she plans to have an abortion. At their facility, Grace and Mason focus their efforts on Marcus, a resident who is about to turn 18 and is struggling with the prospect of leaving the facility.

Grace bonds with Jayden, a recent arrival at Short Term 12 who has a history of self-harm. Jayden distances herself from the other teenagers, as she does not intend to stay at the facility for long. When her father fails to pick her up on her birthday, she reacts violently toward the staff. After her outburst, she sits in the "cool-down room" with Grace, who shows Jayden her own scars from cutting herself. That night, Jayden leaves the facility in the middle of her birthday celebrations. Unable to force her to return, Grace follows Jayden to her father's house. After finding the house empty, they return to Short Term 12. When Jayden reads Grace a metaphorical story she has written, Grace begins to suspect that Jayden was abused by her father.

At a party hosted by Mason's foster parents, he proposes to Grace, who accepts. The following morning, Grace is upset by a phone call that reveals her father is being released from prison. She refuses to be consoled by Mason. She arrives at Short Term 12 to discover that Jayden has been picked up by her father overnight. She is angry at the decision to send Jayden back to her father, but her boss maintains that Jayden denied that she was abused by him. Later that day, Grace finds that Marcus has attempted to commit suicide after the death of his fish.

While waiting at the hospital as Marcus is being treated, Grace breaks down. Mason becomes upset for her refusing to talk to him about how she feels; instead, she tells him that she no longer wants to marry him and that she plans to have an abortion. She returns to Jayden's father's house and breaks in, intending to kill him while he sleeps, but she is interrupted by Jayden, who suggests that they smash his car instead. Grace tells Jayden that she was sexually abused by her own father and that he got her pregnant. After Jayden shows Grace bruises from blows by her father, they return together to Short Term 12, where Jayden reports her father for physical abuse. Grace goes home to apologize to Mason, who tells her that Marcus will recover.

Several weeks later, Grace starts seeing a therapist. She is shown viewing an ultrasound of her unborn baby with Mason. Mason tells the rest of the staff about running into Marcus, who is doing well and has a girlfriend.

== Cast ==
- Brie Larson as Grace Howard
- John Gallagher, Jr. as Mason
- Kaitlyn Dever as Jayden Cole
- Rami Malek as Nate
- LaKeith Stanfield as Marcus
- Kevin Hernandez as Luis
- Melora Walters as Dr. Hendler
- Stephanie Beatriz as Jessica
- Lydia Du Veaux as Kendra
- Alex Calloway as Sammy
- Frantz Turner as Jack
- Diana-Maria Riva as Nurse Beth

== Production ==
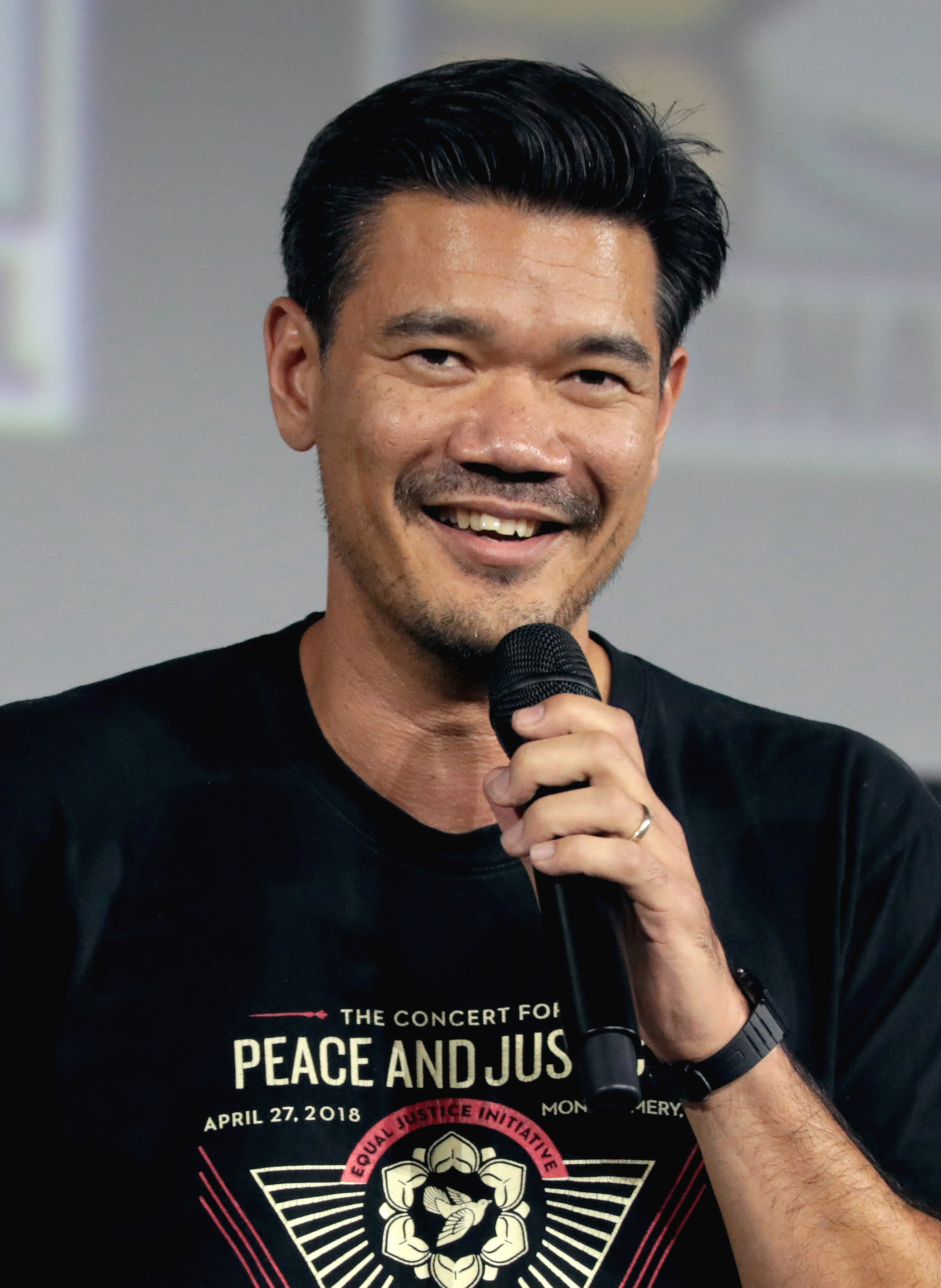
Destin Daniel Cretton based Short Term 12 on his experiences working in a similar facility.

Short Term 12 was originally conceived by Destin Daniel Cretton as a short film based on his experiences as a line staff worker at a group facility for teenagers where he had worked for two years; it served as his thesis project for his master's degree in film at San Diego State University. The short film ran for 22 minutes and premiered at the 2009 Sundance Film Festival, where it won the Jury Prize in Short Filmmaking. After graduating from film school, Cretton decided to adapt the short into a feature-length screenplay, which won one of the Academy of Motion Picture Arts and Sciences' five Nicholl Fellowships in Screenwriting in 2010. The largest change Cretton made when adapting the short film into a longer screenplay was changing the lead character's gender: Denim, a man loosely based on Cretton himself (played by Brad William Henke), became Grace, a young woman and the facility's supervisor. Cretton researched similar facilities and interviewed former employees for the film, noting that the script featured stories directly told by children in these facilities from his interviews.

Brie Larson auditioned for the role of Grace via Skype after the script had been sent to her; John Gallagher, Jr. also won his role after a Skype conversation with Cretton, calling the screenplay "probably the best script that I've been sent, ever". Larson and Gallagher prepared for their roles by shadowing line staff at a group home similar to that in the film, and collaborated to create backstories for their characters. Lakeith Stanfield was the only actor from the original short film to reprise his role in the feature. Cretton struggled to contact Stanfield when casting the film in 2012—Stanfield had stopped acting, left his managers, and did not own a cell phone—but Cretton was eventually able to reach him by email to tape an audition. Most of the children featured in the film were cast through open casting calls, and most had no prior acting experience. Alex Calloway, who played Sammy, found a casting call through Craigslist and won the role after sending in a cell phone video audition.

The film was shot over 20 days in September 2012 (filming began on 9 September 2012). Filming took place in Los Angeles, and scenes set at the group home were shot at a former short-stay facility located near the neighborhood of Sylmar. The film was edited by Nat Sanders as it was filmed. Both the original cut of the film and the shortened director's cut were over 2 hours long, whereas Cretton wanted the final cut to be under 100 minutes. Sanders said that the original cut of the film felt too heavy and "made you feel pretty depressed about humanity", so a number of scenes were deleted or trimmed to "lighten up" the film's mood, with a final running time of 96 minutes.

== Release ==
Short Term 12 premiered in March 2013 at the South by Southwest Film Festival in Austin, Texas, where it won the Grand Jury and Audience Awards in the Narrative Feature category and was purchased for distribution by Cinedigm. Its international premiere was held at the Locarno Film Festival in August 2013, where it received a standing ovation.

In theaters, the film was given a platform release: on August 23, it was released in Los Angeles and New York City, expanding the next weekend to Phoenix, Washington, D.C., Philadelphia, Boston and Berkeley, and progressively expanding to more cities until its widest release on September 13.

The theme song for the Japanese release is "Dawn" by Hana Sekitora.

== Reception ==
=== Box office ===
The film grossed $56,206 in its opening weekend, playing in four theaters, with a per-theater average of $14,052. Overall, it earned a total of $1,013,100 in North America over a total of 26 weeks in theaters, with a widest release of 75 theaters, and $632,064 outside the United States for a total of $1,645,164.

=== Critical response ===
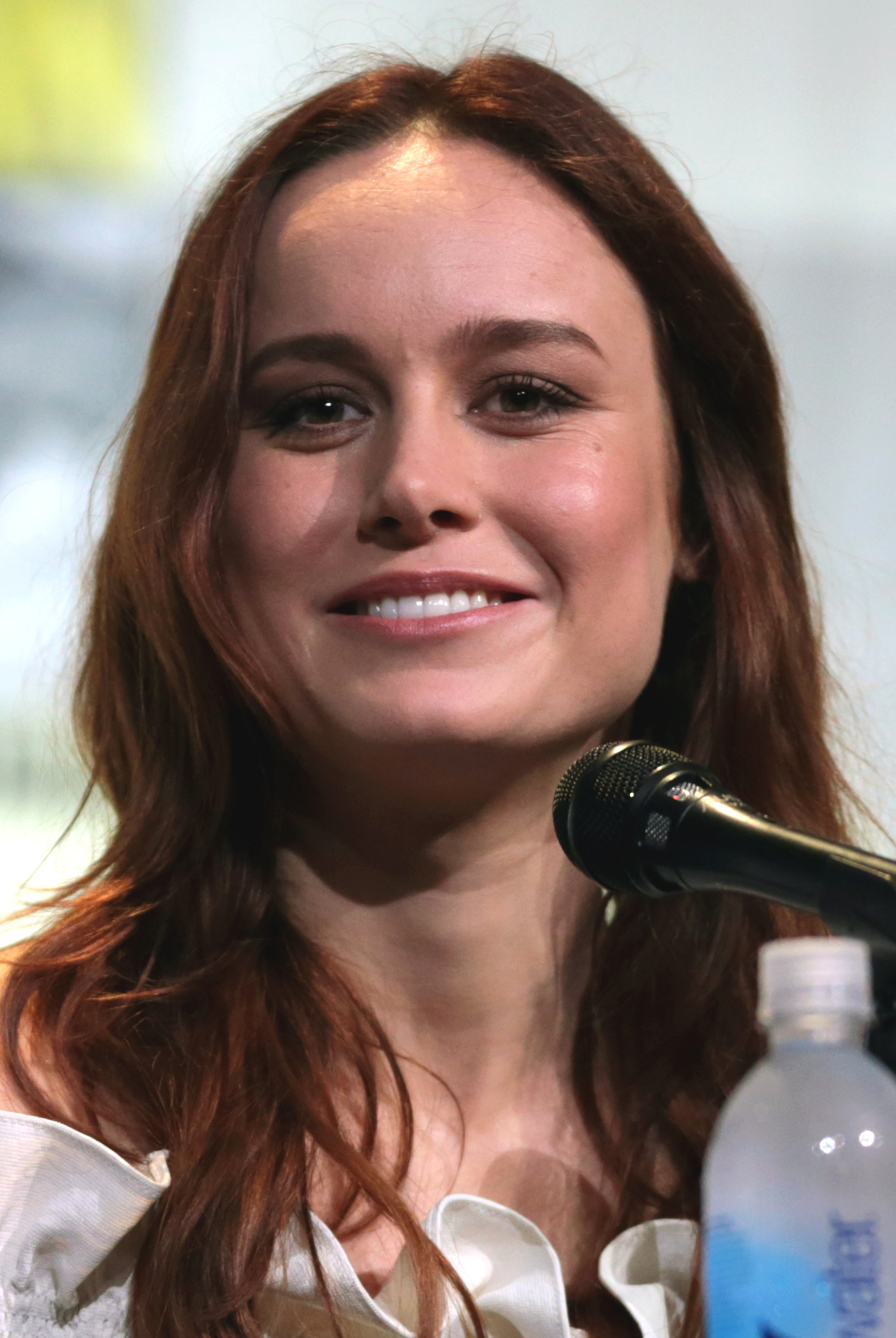
Brie Larson received widespread critical acclaim for her performance as Grace Howard.

On Rotten Tomatoes, the film has an approval rating of 98% based on 172 reviews, with an average rating of 8.36/10. The site's critical consensus reads: "Short Term 12 is an emphatic, revealing drama that pulls audiences into the perspective of neglected youths". On Metacritic the film has a weighted average score of 82 out of 100, based on 36 critics, indicating "universal acclaim".

Germain Lussier of Slashfilm wrote of the film: "The whole thing just feels perfect or magical, a shining example of what cinema is all about", adding: "The performances are mindblowing, the writing sharp, and the direction beautiful. It's a very special movie". In Variety, critic Peter Debruge wrote that "the stunning SXSW fest winner puts the recent Park City competition lineup to shame ... this compelling human drama finds fresh energy in the inspirational-teacher genre, constantly revealing new layers to its characters". In a review for the Los Angeles Times, Kenneth Turan described Short Term 12 as "a small wonder", "a film of exceptional naturalness and empathy", and "moving and intimate", offering particular praise to the film's honesty and plausibility. Peter Bradshaw of The Guardian, on the other hand, criticized the film's credibility, describing it as "well intentioned, but somehow inauthentic" with a "too-cute-to-be-true ending".

The Hollywood Reporter's John DeFore called the film "genuinely moving" and "effortlessly balanced ... Brett Pawlak's handheld camerawork and Cretton's unsentimental direction have a frankness that acknowledges the dramatic extremes in these lives without needing to parade it before the audience". Manohla Dargis of The New York Times also praised Cretton's direction, saying that he "brings you into this coed group home and the lives of its inhabitants casually, with images and scenes that, no matter how transparently considered, feel as if they had been caught on the fly".

Brie Larson's performance as Grace was singled out for praise by critics. Katie Walsh of Indiewire wrote: "[Larson] manages to convey her character as someone fierce and strong and steely, and also utterly fragile, delicate, scared and broken ... It's an incredible emotional and physical performance, and she's a whirlwind". Empire critic Ian Freer felt that Larson gave "a whirling dervish of a performance ... She, like the film, breaks your heart and raises your spirit in one fell swoop".

=== Accolades ===
Award	Date of ceremony	Category	Recipients	Result	Ref.
Austin Film Critics Association	December 17, 2013	Best Film	Short Term 12	Nominated	
Austin Film Critics Association	December 17, 2013	Best Actress	Brie Larson	Won	
Austin Film Critics Association	December 17, 2013	Breakthrough Artist	Brie Larson	Won	
Black Reel Awards	February 13, 2014	Best Supporting Actor	Lakeith Stanfield	Nominated	
Black Reel Awards	February 13, 2014	Best Breakthrough Performance	Lakeith Stanfield	Nominated	
Boston Society of Film Critics	December 8, 2013	Best Actress	Brie Larson	Runner-up	
Boston Online Film Critics Association	January 16, 2014	Best Actress	Brie Larson	Runner-up	
Chicago Film Critics Association	December 16, 2013	Best Actress	Brie Larson	Nominated	
Chicago Film Critics Association	December 16, 2013	Most Promising Filmmaker	Destin Daniel Cretton	Won	
Critics' Choice Movie Awards	January 16, 2014	Best Actress	Brie Larson	Nominated	
Detroit Film Critics Society	December 13, 2013	Best Film	Short Term 12	Nominated	
Detroit Film Critics Society	December 13, 2013	Best Actress	Brie Larson	Won	
Detroit Film Critics Society	December 13, 2013	Breakthrough Performance	Brie Larson	Won	
Detroit Film Critics Society	December 13, 2013	Best Screenplay	Destin Daniel Cretton	Nominated	
Dorian Awards	December 2, 2013	Unsung Film of the Year	Short Term 12	Won	
Flanders International Film Festival Ghent	October 22, 2013	Port of Ghent Public Choice Award	Short Term 12	Won	
Gotham Independent Film Awards	December 2, 2013	Best Actress	Brie Larson	Won	
Hamptons International Film Festival	October 14, 2013	Breakthrough Performer	Brie Larson	Won	
IndieWire Critics Poll	December 17, 2013	Best Lead Performance	Brie Larson	6th place	
IndieWire Critics Poll	December 17, 2013	Top 50 Films of the Year	Short Term 12	16th place	
Independent Spirit Awards	March 1, 2014	Best Female Lead	Brie Larson	Nominated	
Independent Spirit Awards	March 1, 2014	Best Supporting Male	Lakeith Stanfield	Nominated	
Independent Spirit Awards	March 1, 2014	Best Editing	Nat Sanders	Won	
Los Angeles Film Critics Association	December 8, 2013	Best Actress	Brie Larson	Runner-up	
Locarno International Film Festival	August 17, 2013	Golden Leopard	Short Term 12	Nominated	
Locarno International Film Festival	August 17, 2013	Best Actress	Brie Larson	Won	
Locarno International Film Festival	August 17, 2013	Junior Jury Award (International Competition)	Destin Daniel Cretton	Won	
Locarno International Film Festival	August 17, 2013	Prize of the Ecumenical Jury	Destin Daniel Cretton	Won	
Los Angeles Film Festival	June 23, 2013	Audience Award for Best Narrative Feature	Short Term 12	Won	
Little Rock Film Festival	May 19, 2013	Narrative Feature	Short Term 12	Won	
Maui Film Festival	June 18, 2013	Narrative Feature Drama	Short Term 12	Won	
Maui Film Festival	June 18, 2013	Rising Star Award	Brie Larson	Won	
Nantucket Film Festival	June 30, 2013	Screenwriting in a Feature Film	Destin Daniel Cretton	Won	
National Society of Film Critics	January 4, 2014	Best Actress	Brie Larson	Runner-up	
National Board of Review	December 4, 2013	Top Independent Films	Short Term 12	Won	
Online Film Critics Society	December 16, 2013	Best Picture	Short Term 12	Nominated	
Online Film Critics Society	December 16, 2013	Best Actress	Brie Larson	Nominated	
Online Film Critics Society	December 16, 2013	Best Adapted Screenplay	Destin Daniel Cretton	Nominated	
San Diego Film Critics Society	December 11, 2013	Best Film	Short Term 12	Nominated	
San Diego Film Critics Society	December 11, 2013	Best Director	Destin Daniel Cretton	Nominated	
San Diego Film Critics Society	December 11, 2013	Best Adapted Screenplay	Destin Daniel Cretton	Nominated	
San Diego Film Critics Society	December 11, 2013	Best Actress	Brie Larson	Nominated	
San Diego Film Critics Society	December 11, 2013	Best Performance by an Ensemble	Short Term 12	Nominated	
San Francisco Film Critics Circle	December 15, 2013	Best Actress	Brie Larson	Nominated	
Santa Barbara International Film Festival	February 4, 2014	Virtuoso Award	Brie Larson	Won	
Satellite Awards	February 23, 2014	Best Original Song	"So You Know What It's Like", written by Lakeith Stanfield and Destin Daniel Cretton	Nominated	
South by Southwest Film Festival	March 16, 2013	Narrative Feature	Short Term 12	Won	
South by Southwest Film Festival	March 16, 2013	Audience Award: Narrative Feature	Short Term 12	Won	
Tallinn Black Nights Film Festival	November 30, 2013	Best Youth Film	Short Term 12	Nominated	
Tallinn Black Nights Film Festival	November 30, 2013	Best Film	Short Term 12	Won	
Valladolid International Film Festival	October 26, 2013	Official Section Audience Award	Short Term 12	Won	

=== Top ten lists ===
Short Term 12 was listed on many film critics' top ten lists.

- 1st – Kate Walsh, The Playlist
- 1st – Germain Lussier, /Film
- 1st – Tasha Robinson, The Dissolve
- 1st – Matt Singer, The Dissolve
- 2nd – Nathan Rabin, The Dissolve
- 2nd – Scott Feinberg, The Hollywood Reporter
- 3rd – Joe Reid, The Atlantic
- 3rd – Christopher Orr, The Atlantic
- 3rd – Film School Rejects
- 3rd – Drew McWeeny, HitFix
- 3rd – Angie Han, /Film
- 4th – David Chen, /Film
- 4th – Joe Swanberg, Esquire
- 5th – David Edelstein, New York Magazine
- 5th – Kimberley Jones, The Austin Chronicle
- 5th – Anne Thompson, Indiewire
- 6th – Kirsty Puchko, CinemaBlend
- 6th – Genevieve Koski, The Dissolve
- 7th – Peter Debruge, Variety
- 8th – Todd McCarthy, The Hollywood Reporter
- 8th – Christopher Rosen & Mike Ryan, Huffington Post
- 9th – Rene Rodriguez, Miami Herald
- 9th – Yahoo! Movies
- 10th – Ty Burr, Boston Globe
- 10th – Matt Goldberg, Collider
- 10th – Joe Neumaier, New York Daily News
- 10th – James Berardinelli, Reelviews
- 10th (tie with The Spectacular Now) – Jake Coyle, Associated Press
- Top 10 (listed alphabetically, not ranked) – Kenneth Turan, Los Angeles Times
- Top 10 (listed alphabetically, not ranked) – Joe Morgenstern, Wall Street Journal

The Writers Guild Foundation listed Cretton's screenplay as one of the best in 2010s film and television. The script was praised as "loaded with genuine emotion and nonstop empathy. [...] it's such a great script to read for guidance in how characters grow to open-up and bond with each other. Many of the characters, including Grace, begin the story abrasive, defensive or closed-off, but slowly pivot to reveal the trauma and pain underneath, which is the first step toward healing from it."

==== "Oscars snub" ====
Despite the universal acclaim from critics and audiences alike, Short Term 12 was completely shunned by every major industry awards organization from receiving a nomination, especially at the Academy Awards. Major criticism was drawn towards the perceived snub of Brie Larson, whose performance was widely acclaimed and was cited by various critics and publications as one of the best performances of the year. While Forbes called her snub "shocking", The Atlantic called it "disappointing" but "hardly shocking", considering it had not garnered many awards leading up to the Academy Awards.
