= Norm Li =

Canadian cinematographer

Norm Li (Chinese: 李永畧) is a Canadian cinematographer. For his work on the film The Body Remembers When the World Broke Open (2019), Li won the Canadian Screen Award for Best Cinematography.

== Career ==
Li is most noted for his work on the film The Body Remembers When the World Broke Open, for which he won the Canadian Screen Award for Best Cinematography at the 8th Canadian Screen Awards in 2020. He was previously nominated in the same category at the 6th Canadian Screen Awards in 2018 for Never Steady, Never Still, and won the Canadian Screen Award for Best Photography in a Documentary Program or Series at the 4th Canadian Screen Awards in 2016 for Tricks on the Dead: The Story of the Chinese Labour Corps in WWI.

His other credits have included the films Beyond the Black Rainbow (2010), Below Zero (2011), In Their Skin (2012), Afflicted (2013), Cabin Fever: Patient Zero (2014), Edge of Winter (2016), Hollow in the Land (2017) and Same Old (2022).

Li won a Bloodie Award for his cinematography work on Beyond the Black Rainbow at the 2012 Blood in the Snow Canadian Film Festival.

Li also won acclaim for his work on Seagrass (2023).

== Personal life ==
Of Hong Kong Chinese descent, Li was raised in Newfoundland and Labrador, and is currently based in Vancouver, British Columbia.
