= Destin Daniel Cretton =

American filmmaker (born 1978)

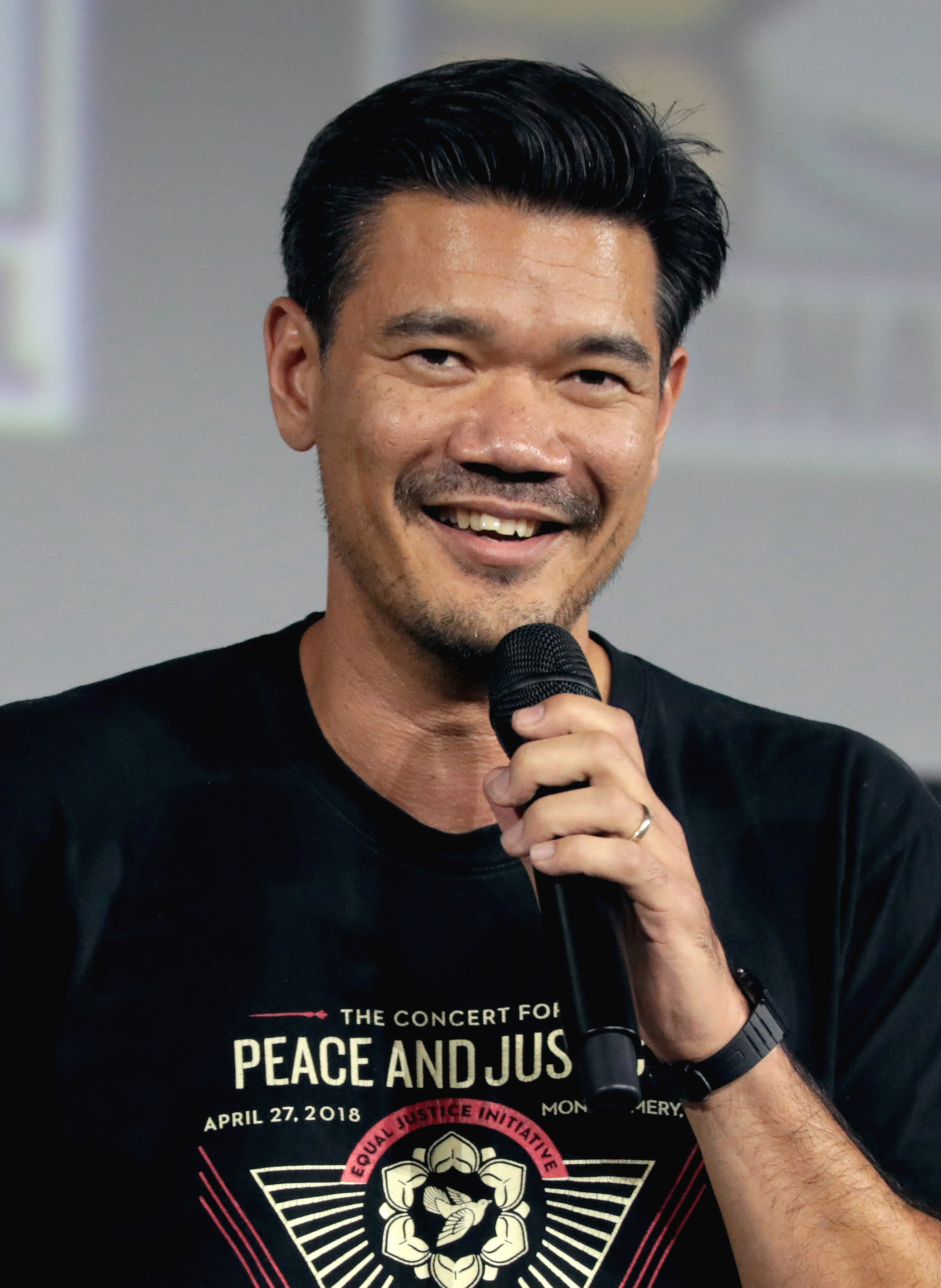
- Cretton at the 2019 San Diego Comic-Con
- Born: Destin Yori Daniel Cretton; November 23, 1978 (age 47); Haiku, Hawaii, U.S.
- Education: Point Loma Nazarene University (BA); San Diego State University (MFA)
- Occupations: Film director; screenwriter; producer; editor
- Years active: 2002–present
- Spouse: Nicola Chapman (m. 2016)
- Children: 2

Destin Yori Daniel Cretton (born November 23, 1978) is an American filmmaker. He is best known for directing the drama films Short Term 12 (2013), The Glass Castle (2017), and Just Mercy (2019) as well as the Marvel Studios films Shang-Chi and the Legend of the Ten Rings (2021), Spider-Man: Brand New Day (2026), and the television series Wonder Man (2026).

Since 2024, Cretton has launched and operated his own production company, Hisako.

== Early life and education ==
Cretton was born and raised in Haiku, Hawaii, on the island of Maui. His mother is Japanese American and his father is White American. He was home-schooled by his Christian mother. His sister Joy is a costume designer who has worked on several of Destin's projects. He lived in Haiku in a two-bedroom house with his five siblings, until he was 19 years old. He moved to San Diego, California, to attend Point Loma Nazarene University, where he majored in communications. After graduating, Cretton worked for two years as a staff person at a group home for at-risk teenagers.

He made short films as a hobby, which developed as a vocational path. He attended and graduated from film school at San Diego State University.

== Career ==
=== 2009–2019: Breakthrough and studio films ===
While at San Diego State University, Cretton made a 22-minute short film, Short Term 12, based on his experiences at the facility for teenagers. The short film premiered at the 2009 Sundance Film Festival, where it won the Jury Prize in Short Filmmaking.

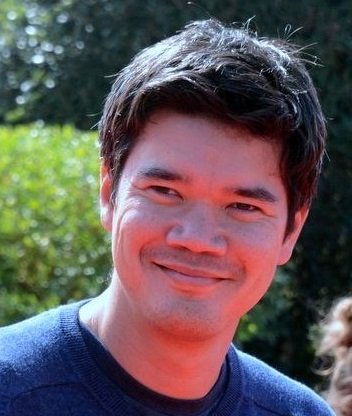
Cretton at the Deauville American Film Festival in 2013

After graduating from film school, Cretton made his feature directorial debut with the 90-minute film, I Am Not a Hipster, which premiered at Sundance on January 20, 2012. The film was produced by Ron Najor, who would later go on to produce the feature adaptation of Short Term 12 alongside Maren Olson, Asher Goldstein, and Joshua Astrachan. Cretton's feature-length screenplay won one of the Academy of Motion Picture Arts and Sciences' five Nicholl Fellowships in Screenwriting in 2010.

The film premiered on March 10, 2013, at South by Southwest, where it won the Grand Jury and Audience Awards for a Narrative Feature. Widely acclaimed as one of the best films of 2013, it was listed on many film critics' annual top ten lists. The film earned several accolades, including three Independent Spirit Award nominations.

In 2014, Cretton was attached to rewrite the script and direct The Glass Castle, an adaptation of Jeannette Walls' 2005 best-selling memoir of the same name about a successful young woman raised by severely dysfunctional parents. Starring Brie Larson, the film also features Woody Harrelson and Naomi Watts as her alcoholic father and eccentric mother, respectively. Larson's role was originally considered by Jennifer Lawrence, but she dropped out while the studio was seeking the male lead. The film was released on August 10, 2017. It received mixed reviews from critics; they praised the performances of its cast (particularly Larson and Harrelson) but criticized the emotional tones and adaptation of the source material.

In 2016, it was announced that Ryan Coogler had teamed up with Cretton and poet/playwright Chinaka Hodge to develop Minors, a television drama series produced by Charles D. King. Drawing from Cretton's experiences working in residential foster care, Hodge's background teaching under-served youth in San Francisco Bay area continuation schools and Coogler's upbringing in the East Bay, Minors promises to take an unflinching look at institutionalization, exploring juvenile facilities and the children who grow up in that system. The series will show how that system shapes young people over a one-year period. Hodge will write the series, and Coogler and Cretton will direct.

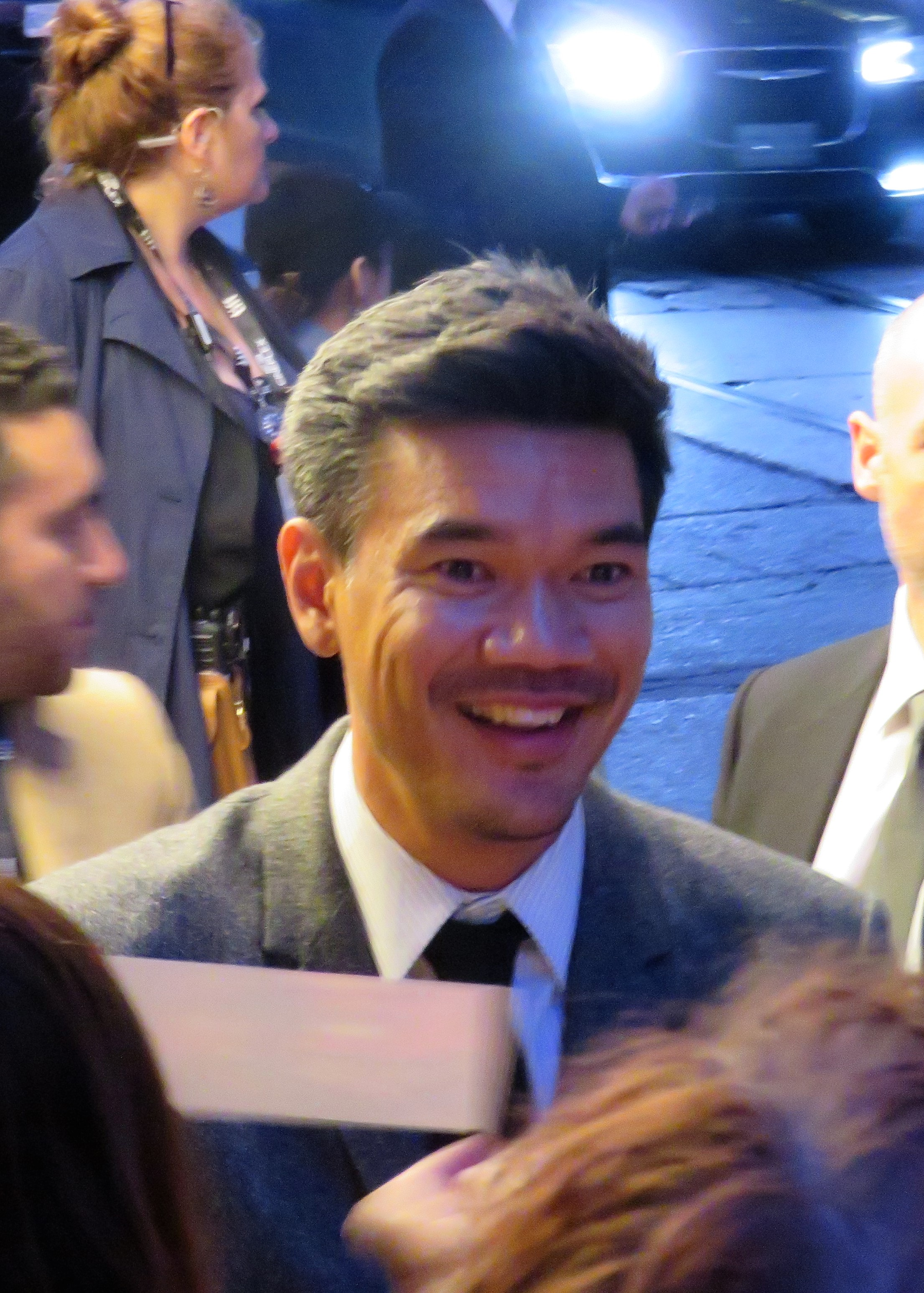
Cretton in 2019

Cretton subsequently teamed with Larson and Michael B. Jordan for Just Mercy, a drama film based on civil rights defense attorney Bryan Stevenson's New York Times bestselling memoir: Just Mercy: A Story of Justice and Redemption. Stevenson founded the Equal Justice Initiative in Montgomery, Alabama, where he provided defense counsel to men on death row. The plot follows Stevenson (Jordan) as he explores the case of a death row prisoner, Walter McMillian, whom he fought to free. The film premiered at the Toronto International Film Festival on September 6, 2019, and was theatrically released on December 25, 2019, by Warner Bros. Pictures. Just Mercy was critically acclaimed.

=== 2020–present: Collaborations with the MCU ===
In March 2019, Cretton was hired by Marvel Studios to direct a film based on Shang-Chi. Both the film and Cretton's involvement were confirmed during San Diego Comic-Con in 2019, with the film being titled Shang-Chi and the Legend of the Ten Rings. The film, which is Marvel's first superhero movie tentpole franchise with an Asian protagonist, stars Simu Liu as the title character, with Tony Leung Chiu-wai and Awkwafina co-starring. On January 5, 2020, Cretton said that he signed up to the project because he wanted "to give [his] son a superhero to look up to". The film was set to be released on February 12, 2021, but was delayed to May 7 and later July 9 due to the COVID-19 pandemic. During the midst of the coronavirus pandemic, Shang-Chi's production in Australia was temporarily suspended while Cretton self-isolated. Production was halted on March 12, 2020, and resumed in August 2020 and concluded in October 2020. Shang-Chi and the Legend of the Ten Rings was released in theaters on September 3, 2021. In December 2021, Cretton signed a deal with Marvel Studios and Hulu's Onyx Collective to develop a Shang-Chi sequel and new Disney+ MCU series through his production banner Family Owned. In June 2022, the series was revealed to be in early development and titled Wonder Man, centered on the character Simon Williams / Wonder Man, with Cretton directing two episodes of the series and developing it with series creator and showrunner Andrew Guest. In July, Cretton was confirmed as the director of Avengers: The Kang Dynasty for Marvel Studios. In November 2023, Cretton stepped down as the director of Avengers: The Kang Dynasty to focus on other Marvel projects, such as the Shang-Chi sequel and Wonder Man.

In December 2022, Cretton was revealed to be an executive producer on the short film Same Old, which was written and directed by Lloyd Lee Choi. Cretton also produced a feature-length film adaptation of the short, titled Lucky Lu, through his Family Owned banner alongside Ron Najor and Asher Goldstein, with Choi returning as writer and director. The following year, Cretton was reported to be an executive producer on Choi's short film Closing Dynasty.

In February 2024, Cretton was revealed to be directing, co-writing, and co-producing Naruto, based on the manga series of the same name for Lionsgate. In September that same year, it was announced Cretton would be directing the film Spider-Man: Brand New Day for Sony Pictures and Marvel Studios, that was released on July 31, 2026. In December 2024, it was reported that Cretton had joined as an executive producer of In the Garden of Tulips, a short film directed by Julia Elihu, whom Cretton met a decade prior while establishing the film program at Elihu's high school, Canyon Crest Academy in San Diego.

== Personal life ==
In 2016, Cretton married fashion designer Nicola "Nikki" Chapman. They have two children.

== Filmography ==
=== Film ===
Year	Title	Director	Writer	Notes
2012	I Am Not a Hipster	Yes	Yes	Also producer and editor
2013	Short Term 12	Yes	Yes	
2017	The Glass Castle	Yes	Yes	Co-wrote with Andrew Lanham and Marti Noxon
2017	The Shack	No	Yes	Co-wrote with John Fusco and Andrew Lanham
2019	Just Mercy	Yes	Yes	Co-wrote with Andrew Lanham
2021	Shang-Chi and the Legend of the Ten Rings	Yes	Yes	Co-wrote with David Callaham and Andrew Lanham
2026	Spider-Man: Brand New Day	Yes	Uncredited	

Executive producer

- Same Old (2022)

Producer

- Lucky Lu (2025)

Additional literary material

- Avengers: Doomsday (2026)

Documentary film

Year	Title	Director	Writer	Notes
2006	Drakmar: A Vassal's Journey	Yes	Yes	Also co-producer and editor

=== Television ===
Year	Title	Director	Executive producer	Notes
2022–2024	Tokyo Vice	No	Yes	
2023	American Born Chinese	Yes	Yes	2 episodes
2026	Wonder Man	Yes	Yes	2 episodes, also co-creator
