= Same Old =

2022 Canadian-American short film directed by Lloyd Lee Choi

- Directed by: Lloyd Lee Choi
- Written by: Lloyd Lee Choi
- Produced by: Lloyd Lee Choi; Tony Yang
- Starring: Limin Wang
- Cinematography: Norm Li
- Edited by: Lloyd Lee Choi
- Production companies: Collective Pictures division7
- Release date: May 27, 2022 (Cannes)
- Running time: 15 minutes
- Countries: Canada; United States
- Language: English

Same Old is a 2022 Canadian-American short drama film, written, produced, edited, and directed by Lloyd Lee Choi. The film stars Limin Wang as Lu, a food delivery driver in New York City who, after his e-bike is stolen, must come to terms with the fragility of his life in America as he cannot afford to replace the bike in order to maintain his livelihood.

The film premiered in the short film competition at the 2022 Cannes Film Festival. It had its North American premiere at the 2022 Toronto International Film Festival, where it received an honourable mention from the Best Canadian Short Film jury.

The film was named to TIFF's annual year-end Canada's Top Ten list for 2022.

In 2025, Lucky Lu was released. Directed by Lloyd Lee Choi, the film is a feature-length expansion of Same Old.
