= I Am Not a Hipster =

- Film poster
- Directed by: Destin Daniel Cretton
- Written by: Destin Daniel Cretton
- Produced by: Destin Daniel Cretton; Ron Najor
- Starring: Dominic Bogart
- Cinematography: Brett Pawlak
- Edited by: Destin Daniel Cretton
- Music by: Joel P. West
- Production company: Uncle Freddy Productions
- Release dates: January 20, 2012 (Sundance); January 10, 2013
- Running time: 90 minutes
- Country: United States
- Language: English

I Am Not a Hipster is a 2012 American independent drama film written and directed by Destin Daniel Cretton and starring Dominic Bogart. It is Cretton's directorial debut.

== Plot ==
Brook is a rising musician in the San Diego indie music scene, known for his emotionally raw, self-recorded songs and compelling live performances. Despite his success, he remains bitter and detached, isolating himself from those around him. His best friend and biggest supporter, Clark, tries to promote his music, but Brook dismisses his efforts and ridicules his artistic tastes.

Brook's personal relationships are strained—he avoids his ex-girlfriend, clashes with local artists, and publicly lashes out in frustration. Beneath his hostility is unresolved grief over his mother’s recent passing, a loss he refuses to acknowledge.

His three sisters and father arrive in town with the intention of spreading their mother’s ashes at sea, but Brook resists their attempts to reconnect. While he interacts with his sisters, he remains distant from his father, refusing to engage with him until emotions reach a breaking point. As tensions rise, Brook finally confronts his grief and the reasons behind his self-destructive behavior.

Brook struggles to balance his artistic ambitions with his personal turmoil, ultimately facing the impact of his actions on those who care about him. He is forced to make a choice between continuing his cycle of isolation or allowing himself to reconnect with his family and friends.

== Cast ==
- Dominic Bogart as Brooke Hyde
- Alvaro Orlando as Clarke
- Tammy Minoff as Joy
- Lauren Coleman as Spring
- Kandis Erickson as Merrily
- Brad William Henke as Bradley Haines
- Adam Shapiro as Dennis / Spaceface
- Tania Verafield as Kells
- Eva Mah as Taylor
- Michael Harding as Dad

== Reception ==
I Am Not a Hipster received generally positive reviews from critics, with praise for its emotional depth, portrayal of grief, and Dominic Bogart’s lead performance. The Los Angeles Times described it as a "lovingly crafted, deeply affecting drama" and highlighted Bogart’s performance as a standout. IONCINEMA praised the film’s raw emotion, exploration of art’s purpose, and its soundtrack by Joel P. West. Film Threat called it "moving and thought-provoking", while Three Imaginary Girls commended its authenticity and music, despite its somber tone.

Some critics offered mixed reactions, citing the film’s narrow focus on its brooding protagonist. Variety and The Village Voice suggested that a broader perspective on the indie-rock scene could have contextualized the character’s self-absorption. The A.V. Club found the film compelling in parts but felt it did not fully come together.

On Rotten Tomatoes, it has a 71% score based on reviews from 7 critics.
