= Lloyd Lee Choi =

Canadian film director and screenwriter

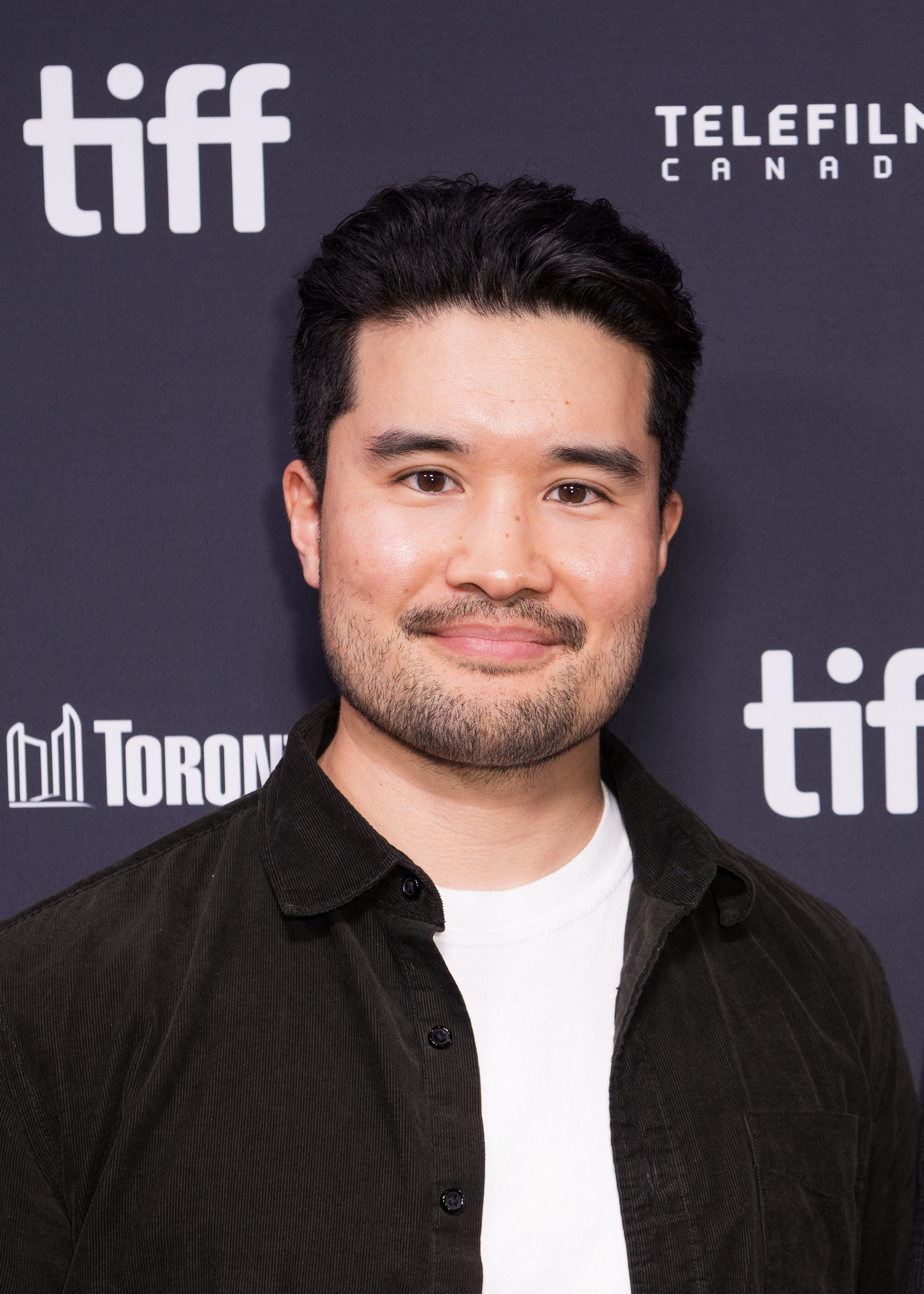
- Choi at TIFF 2025
- Occupations: Film director; screenwriter
- Notable work: Same Old (2022)
- Website: lloydleechoi.com

Lloyd Lee Choi is a Canadian film director and screenwriter. He is most noted for his 2022 short film Same Old, which premiered in the short film competition at the 2022 Cannes Film Festival, and received an honorable mention from the Best Canadian Short Film jury at the 2022 Toronto International Film Festival.

== Life and career ==
Originally from Ottawa, Ontario, Choi had planned to study aerospace engineering at university, but changed his mind and moved to Vancouver, British Columbia to study film-making. In 2015 he joined Variable, a New York City-based film-making collective.

He has also directed the short films Foxtrot (2013), 40 Love (2014), Wanderlust (2015), Before Mars (2016) and Closing Dynasty (2022), and has worked in advertising as a director of television commercials. He received a Western Canadian Music Award nomination for Video Director of the Year in 2018 for "Closer", a single by Winnipeg indie pop band Mise en Scene.

In 2022 he was named a recipient of the Future Gold Film Fellowship, a Netflix-sponsored program to produce short films by East Asian and Pacific Islander directors.

His feature film debut Lucky Lu, a full-length expansion of Same Old, premiered in the Directors Fortnight program at the 2025 Cannes Film Festival. In the same year, he was named the winner of the TIFF-CBC Films Screenwriter Award for his screenplay Yakult Ajumma.
