= List of Brie Larson performances =

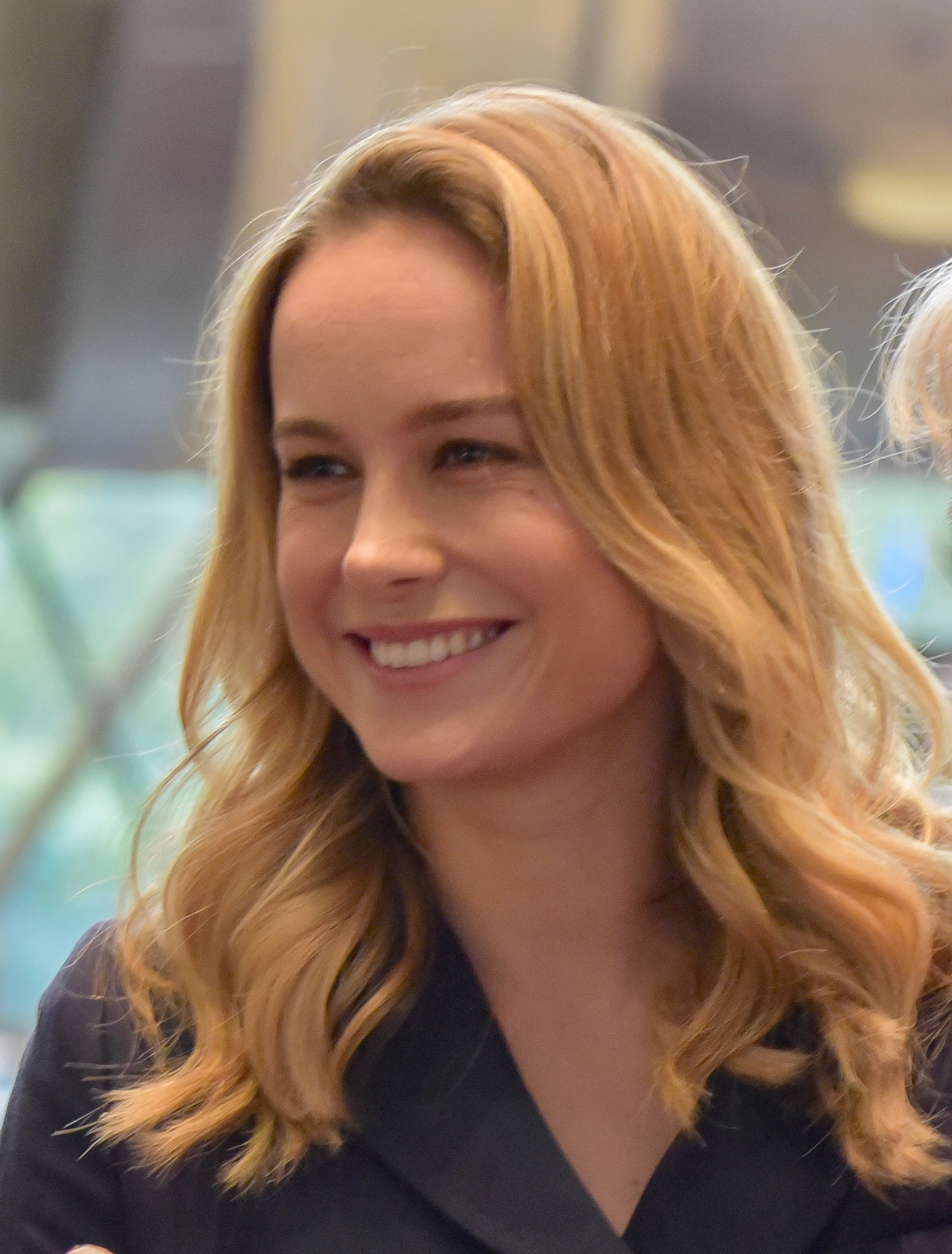
Larson at an event for Captain Marvel in 2018

Brie Larson is an American actress and filmmaker. Her first screen appearance was in a comedy sketch at age eight in a 1999 episode of The Tonight Show with Jay Leno. Following several television appearances, including as a main cast member in the short-lived sitcom Raising Dad (2001), Larson played minor roles in the 2004 comedy films Sleepover and 13 Going on 30. In 2005, she released a studio album named Finally Out of P.E., in which her single “She Said” peaked at number 31 on the Billboard Hot Singles Sales chart.

Larson's first major film role was in the teen comedy Hoot (2006) and she went on to gain wider recognition for playing the daughter of Toni Collette's character in the Showtime comedy-drama series United States of Tara (2009–2011). She took on supporting roles of the love interest in the comedies Scott Pilgrim vs. the World (2010) and 21 Jump Street (2012), and played the troubled daughter of Woody Harrelson's character in the drama Rampart (2011). Her breakthrough came in 2013 when she starred as the distraught supervisor of a foster-care home in Destin Daniel Cretton's independent drama Short Term 12. Following more supporting roles in the romance The Spectacular Now (2013) and the comedy Trainwreck (2015), Larson won the Academy Award for Best Actress for playing a young mother held in captivity in the independent drama Room (2015).

In 2017, Larson expanded to big-budget films with the adventure film Kong: Skull Island, which grossed over $560 million worldwide, and made her solo directorial debut with the coming of age comedy film Unicorn Store, in which she also starred. Larson went on to play Carol Danvers in Captain Marvel and Avengers: Endgame, both 2019 superhero films set in the Marvel Cinematic Universe. Both films rank as the top-grossing films of 2019; the former is the first female-led superhero film to earn over $1 billion and the latter is the second highest-grossing film of all time. After a hiatus, Larson had a supporting role in the action film Fast X and led the Apple TV+ period drama miniseries Lessons in Chemistry (both 2023). Her performance in the latter earned her nominations for a Golden Globe Award and a Primetime Emmy Award.

== Acting credits ==
=== Film ===
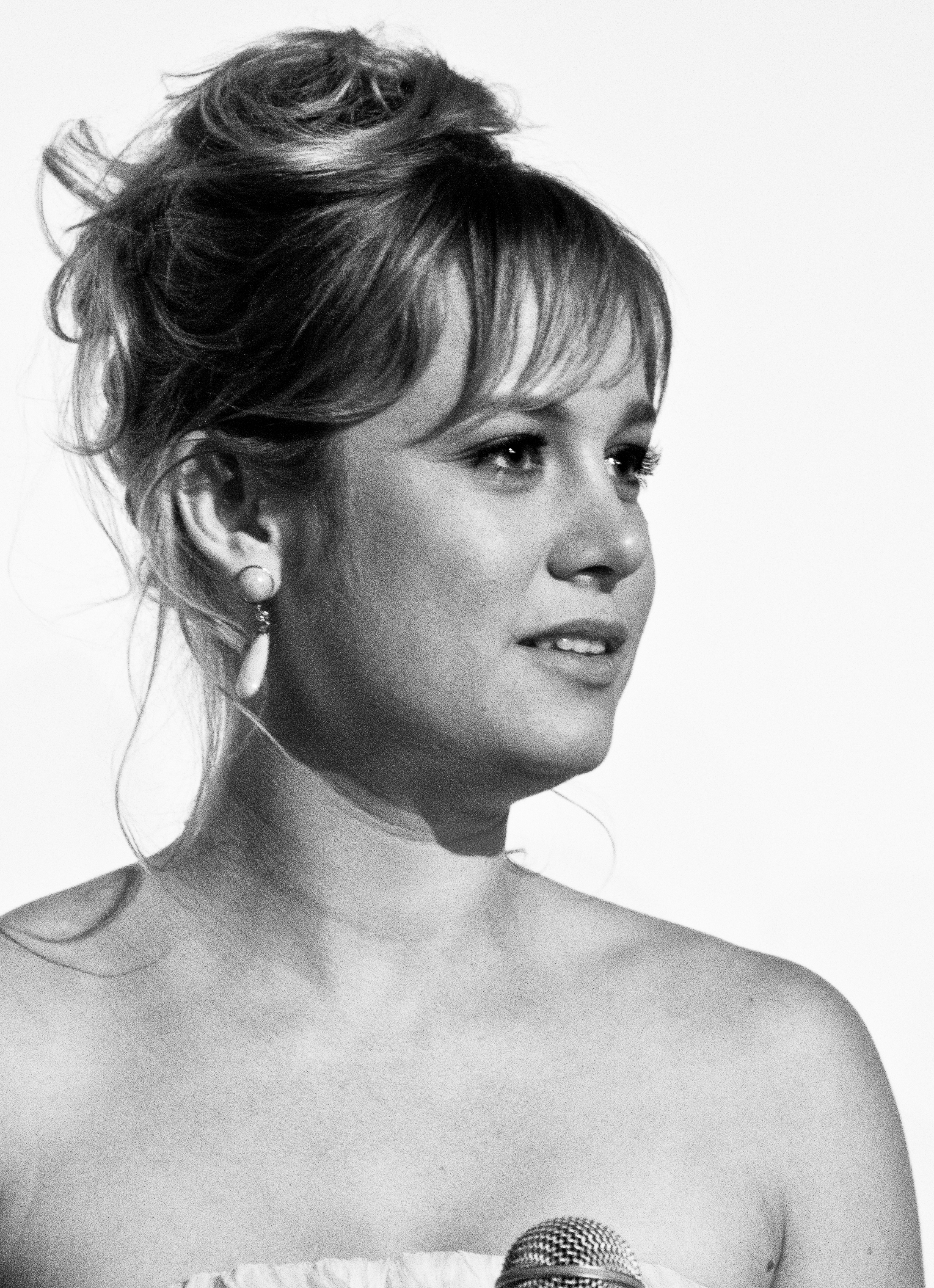
Larson at the premiere of Rampart in 2011

Key
†	Denotes films that have not yet been released

Year	Title	Role	Notes	Ref.
2001	Madison	Racing Girl No. 2		
2004	13 Going on 30	Six Chick		
2004	Sleepover	Liz Daniels		
2006	Hoot	Beatrice Leep		
2007	Farce of the Penguins	I Need a Z-Pack Penguin	Voice	
2007	Remember the Daze	Angie Ford		
2008	The Babysitter	Babysitter	Short film	
2009	House Broken	Suzy Decker		
2009	Just Peck	Emily Donaldson		
2009	Tanner Hall	Kate		
2010	Greenberg	Sara		
2010	Scott Pilgrim vs. the World	Natalie "Envy" Adams		
2011	Rampart	Helen		
2012	21 Jump Street	Molly Tracey		
2012	The Trouble with Bliss	Stephanie Jouseski		
2012	The Arm	—N/a	Short film, co-director and co-writer	
2013	Bitter Orange	Myrtle	Short film	
2013	Don Jon	Monica Martello		
2013	Short Term 12	Grace Howard		
2013	Weighting	Unnamed	Short film, also co-director and co-writer	
2013	The Spectacular Now	Cassidy Roy		
2014	The Gambler	Amy Phillips		
2015	Digging for Fire	Max		
2015	Trainwreck	Kim Townsend		
2015	Room	Joy "Ma" Newsome		
2016	Free Fire	Justine		
2017	Kong: Skull Island	Mason Weaver		
2017	The Glass Castle	Jeannette Walls		
2017	Unicorn Store	Kit	Also director and producer	
2017	Basmati Blues	Linda	Filmed in 2013	
2019	Captain Marvel	Carol Danvers / Captain Marvel		
2019	Avengers: Endgame	Carol Danvers / Captain Marvel		
2019	Just Mercy	Eva Ansley		
2019	Between Two Ferns: The Movie	Herself	Cameo	
2019	Fantastic Fungi	Narrator	Documentary	
2021	Remembering	The Writer / Light	Short film	
2021	Shang-Chi and the Legend of the Ten Rings	Carol Danvers / Captain Marvel	Uncredited cameo	
2023	Fast X	Tess		
2023	The Marvels	Carol Danvers / Captain Marvel		
2026	The Super Mario Galaxy Movie	Rosalina	Voice	
2027	Skeletons †	TBA	Post-production	
2028	One Italian Summer †	Katy Silver	Pre-production; also executive producer	
TBA	Close Personal Friends †	TBA	Post-production	

=== Television ===
Key
†	Denotes series that have not yet been released

Year	Title	Role	Notes	Ref(s)
1998–1999	The Tonight Show with Jay Leno	Various		
1998	To Have & to Hold	Lily Quinn	2 episodes	
1999	Touched by an Angel	Rachel	Episode: "Into the Fire"	
1999	Popular	Robin Robin	Episode: "Fall on Your Knees"	
2000	Then Came You	Young Allison	Episode: "Then Came Aidan's Ex"	
2001–2002	Raising Dad	Emily Stewart	Main role; 22 episodes	
2003	Right on Track	Courtney Enders	Television film	
2003	Hope & Faith	Sydney Shanowski	Unaired pilot	
2008	Ghost Whisperer	Krista Eisenburg	Episode: "Slam"	
2009	The Burg	Hipster Girl	Episode: "Change"	
2009–2011	United States of Tara	Kate Gregson	Main role; 36 episodes	
2011	The League	Ashley	2 episodes	
2012	NTSF:SD:SUV::	Katerin	Episode: "The Real Bicycle Thief"	
2013	Kroll Show	College Girl	2 episodes	
2013–2014	Community	Rachel	3 episodes	
2015	Comedy Bang! Bang!	Herself	Episode: "Brie Larson Wears a Billowy Long-Sleeve Shirt and White Saddle Shoes"	
2016	Saturday Night Live	Herself	Episode: "Brie Larson/Alicia Keys"	
2019	Carpool Karaoke: The Series	Herself	Episode: "Samuel L. Jackson & Brie Larson"	
2019	Jimmy Kimmel Live!	Guest Host	Episode: "Guest Hostess Brie Larson / Jamie Foxx"	
2019	Running Wild with Bear Grylls	Herself	Episode: "Brie Larson"	
2020	Animal Talking with Gary Whitta	Herself	Voice; episode: "Brie Larson, DrLupo, Friskk, Kenny Fong"	
2022	Ms. Marvel	Carol Danvers / Captain Marvel	Episode: "No Normal"; uncredited mid-credits cameo	
2022	Growing Up	Host	Also creator, executive producer and director	
2023	HouseBroken	Bowie	Voice; Episode: "Who's Getting Up There?"	
2023	Lessons in Chemistry	Elizabeth Zott	8 episodes; also executive producer	
2023	Scott Pilgrim Takes Off	Natalie "Envy" Adams	Voice; 6 episodes	
2024	Marvel Studios: Assembled	Herself	Episode: "The Making of The Marvels"	
2025	The Bear	Francie Fak	Episode: "Bears"	
TBA	Cry Wolf †	April	Main role; also executive producer	

=== Theater ===
Year	Production	Role	Venue	Ref.
2010	Our Town	Emily Webb	Williamstown Theatre Festival	
2025	Elektra	Electra	Theatre Royal, Brighton	
2025	Elektra	Electra	Duke of York's Theatre, West End	

== Theme park attractions ==
Year	Production	Role	Venue	Ref.
2022	Avengers: Quantum Encounter	Carol Danvers / Captain Marvel	Disney Wish	
2022	Avengers Assemble: Flight Force	Carol Danvers / Captain Marvel	Disneyland Paris	
2028	Stark Flight Lab	Carol Danvers / Captain Marvel	Disney California Adventure	

== Video games ==
Year	Title	Role	Ref(s)
2022	Fortnite Battle Royale	The Paradigm	

== Music videos ==
Year	Title	Performer(s)	Director	Album	Ref.
2005	"She Said"	Brie Larson	Chris Applebaum		
2005	"Hope Has Wings"	Brie Larson	—N/a	Barbie and the Magic of Pegasus	
2008	"Junk Food"	Lexicon	David H. Steinberg	Junk Food (EP)	
2012	"Never Enough"	JJAMZ	Eddie O'Keefe	Suicide Pact	
2014	"Just One of the Guys"	Jenny Lewis	Jenny Lewis	The Voyager	
2015	"No Cities to Love"	Sleater-Kinney	Ali Greer	No Cities to Love	
2017	"Family Feud"	Jay-Z (featuring Beyoncé)	Ava DuVernay	4:44	

== Discography ==
=== Albums ===
As primary artist

Title	Album details	Ref(s).
Finally Out of P.E.	Released: October 18, 2005; Label: Casablanca Records	

Other credits

Year	Title	Artist	Credit	Ref.
2008	Army Navy	Army Navy	Vocals	
2012	Overexposed	Maroon 5	Vocals (background)	

=== Singles ===
Year	Title	Hot Singles Sales	Album
2005	"She Said"	31	Finally Out of P.E.
2005	"Life After You"	—N/a	Finally Out of P.E.

Other appearances

Year	Album	Title	Ref(s).
2006	Hoot	"Coming Around"	
2015	Room	"Big Rock Candy Mountain"	
2018	Basmati Blues	"All Signs Point to Yes"	
2018	Basmati Blues	"When Tomorrow Comes"	
2018	Basmati Blues	"Love Don't Knock at My Door"	
2018	Basmati Blues	"All in My Mind"	
2018	Basmati Blues	"Foolish Heart"	
2018	Basmati Blues	"Our Voices Will Be Heard"	
2021	Scott Pilgrim vs. the World	"Black Sheep" (Metric featuring Brie Larson)	

== See also ==
- List of awards and nominations received by Brie Larson
