= Rodney Chrome =

American musician, dancer and performance artist

- Also known as: Atlas
- Born: Rodney Anderson Little Rock, Arkansas, U.S.
- Origin: New York City, New York U.S.
- Genres: pop-rap; r&b; hyperpop; electronic
- Occupations: rapper; singer; dancer; producer
- Instrument: vocals
- Years active: 2020–present
- Label: SONG Music LLC

Rodney Anderson, known professionally as Rodney Chrome, is an American rapper, singer, songwriter and producer from Little Rock, Arkansas. His music spans multiple genres, including pop-rap, R&B, hyperpop, and electronic music. His work also touches on themes of race, sexuality, gender expression, and intersectional identity. Chrome has produced music for the Disney+ documentary series Growing Up and the Hulu series The Hair Tales.

== Early life ==
Rodney Chrome was born Rodney Anderson and raised in Little Rock, Arkansas. He began writing and recording music at the age of 12. He also trained in dance, studying Modern, Lyrical, Contemporary, Ballet, and Hip-Hop.

Chrome later relocated to New York City to attend the Tisch School of the Arts at New York University. He graduated in 2022, and delivered the class commencement speech at Yankee Stadium.

== Career ==
Chrome initially released music under the alias "Atlas" while based in Arkansas. After moving to New York City, he began an ongoing collaboration with Hyperpop artist Underscores. His debut EP, Queer Pressure, was released in June 2020. The project explored what it was like for Chrome to grow up as a Black queer man. Zac Dov Wiesel directed the music videos for the songs "Pulpit" and "5 Starz".

Chrome played at the 2021 Afropunk Festival in New York. The same year, 300 Entertainment chose him as one of three Intern To CEO program winners. Later, Chrome composed the score for the Disney+ documentary series Growing Up by Brie Larson. His recordings were also featured in the Hulu documentary series The Hair Tales by Oprah Winfrey.

In 2022, Chrome released the EP Ghetto Popstar Vol. 1. Wiesel filmed the music video for the EP's lead single, "To the Money" in New York City.

In 2023, Chrome released the single "Break the Internet". He later won the Songwriters Hall of Fame - Abe Olman Scholarship for Excellence in Songwriting.

In 2025, he released the EP GO. The project included the single "BBL", which Chrome performed on the COLORS platform.

== Awards and nominations ==
Year	Award	Category	Nominated work	Result	Ref.
2020	National Film Festival for Talented Youth	Audience Award	Pulpit	Won	
2022	UK Music Video Awards	Best Hip Hop/Grime/Rap Video – Newcomer	To the Money	Nominated	
2022	Young Director Award	Music Video	To the Money	Silver	
2022	Aesthetica Shorts Film Festival	Music Video	To the Money	Official Selection	
2023	South by Southwest	Music Video	To the Money	Official Selection	
2024	Black Reel TV Awards	Outstanding Musical Score	Ladies First: A Story of Women in Hip-Hop	Nominated	

== Personal life ==
Chrome is currently based in Brooklyn, New York. He identifies as queer.

== Discography ==
=== EPs ===
- Queer Pressure (2020)
- Ghetto Popstar Vol. 1 (2022).
- GO (2025)

=== Singles ===
- "To the Money" (2022)
- "Break the Internet (2023)"
- "BBL" (2025)

== Videography ==
=== Music videos ===
- "To the Money"
