= Shoebox =

Shoebox, shoe-box or shoe box may refer to:

- A box for storing shoes

== Entertainment ==
- "Shoe Box", a 1995 single by the Canadian band Barenaked Ladies
- Shoebox (album), a 2014 album by the South Korean hip-hop group Epik High
- "Shoebox", a song by Brie Larson from the 2005 album Finally Out of P.E.
- "Shoe Box", a song by Ron Contour, Factor Chandelier, and Def3 from the 2010 album Saffron

== Architecture ==
- Dingbat (building)
- Shoebox style, in architecture

== Other ==
- IBM Shoebox, a 1961 computer that was able to perform math and perform speech recognition
- Shoebox (originally Shoebox Greetings), a brand of humorous greeting cards by Hallmark Cards
- Shoebox effect
- Shoebox Ford
- Shoe-box system, an early fault-tolerant computer system architecture type by Tolerant Systems
