= Elijah Allan-Blitz =

American actor, director and musician (born 1987)

- Born: February 18, 1987 (age 39); Santa Barbara, California U.S
- Occupations: Actor, musician, film director
- Website: www.elijah-ab.com

Elijah Allan-Blitz (born February 18, 1987) is an American actor, musician, and Emmy award winning film director. He is known for his direction of the Emmy-nominated virtual reality experience "Take Every Wave: Laird in VR", which won a Lumiere Award.

== Background ==
Allan-Blitz was born in Santa Barbara, California. As a musician, his single "Hey Yo" was nominated in the Grand Jury Award for Best Music Video (Best Visual) category at the International Festival of Cinema Awards.

He has worked on The Shield, independent films and short films and the Peter Bogdanovich feature film, She's Funny That Way.

Allan-Blitz, is one of the first virtual reality directors for Time magazine, and an Emmy nominee and Lumiere Award winner. His virtual reality experience about the Holocaust was published as a companion piece for the Ken Burns documentary, Defying the Nazis: The Sharps' War.

He has also directed virtual reality experiences for PBS, Van Jones, Aloe Blacc, HBO, Laird Hamilton and a VR psychedelic trip for Michael Pollan's book How To Change Your Mind.

== Personal life ==
Allan-Blitz started dating actress Brie Larson in 2019. They have since broken up.

== Filmography ==
- The Shield (Jeffrey), 2003
- In This Life (Maxwell/Lance/Seth), 2013
- She's Funny That Way (Cloisters Security Guard), 2014
- Envoy (Sniper), 2014
- Breakup Moving Service (Boyfriend #2), 2014
- Full Ride (Luke), 2014
- Miami Dead County (Jake), 2016
- In This Life (Maxwell), 2018

== Discography ==
- "The Way the World Ends" (feat. Bishop Lamont), single, 2010
- "Come With Me Child" (feat. Aja & Elena), single, 2010
- "Dmt", single, 2011
- The Photon Belt, album, 2012
