= Half Broke Horses =

2009 novel by Jeannette Walls

- Author: Jeannette Walls
- Language: English
- Genre: Novel
- Publisher: Simon and Schuster, Inc.
- Publication date: 2009 (hardcover); 2010 (paperback)
- Publication place: United States
- Pages: 288 (first edition)
- Preceded by: The Glass Castle

Half Broke Horses is a 2009 novel by American writer Jeannette Walls detailing the life of her grandmother, Lily Casey Smith. The book was published by Simon and Schuster.

== Summary ==
Half Broke Horses is the story of Lily Casey Smith's life. Author Jeannette Walls, the granddaughter of Lily Casey Smith, wrote the book from Lily's perspective.

As a child growing up on the frontier in Texas, Lily learns how to break horses. At the age of fifteen, she rode five hundred miles, alone, to get to her job as a teacher in a one-room schoolhouse. Later in her life, Lily runs a vast cattle ranch in Arizona, along with her second husband and their two children. A woman of many talents, Lily earns extra money at various points in her life by playing poker, selling bootleg liquor, and riding in horse races.

Half Broke Horses depicts the freedom of rural life, its joys and struggles, and celebrates the courage and spirit of its protagonist, Lily Casey Smith. Walls says the book is “in the vein of an oral history, a retelling of stories handed down by my family through the years, and undertaken with the storyteller’s traditional liberties.”

== Reception ==
In The New York Times Book Review, critic Liesl Schillinger wrote, "Through the adventures of Lily Casey — mustang breaker, schoolteacher, ranch wife, bootlegger, poker player, racehorse rider, bush pilot and mother of two — Walls revisits the adrenaline-charged frontier background that gave her own mother a lifelong taste for vicissitude. 'I’m an excitement addict,' Rose Mary Walls liked to tell her children. And yet — can the contours of one woman’s life ever sufficiently explain the life that proceeds from hers? Rose Mary eventually found an anchor in the form of her daughter — the third generation of a line of indomitable women whose paths she has inscribed on the permanent record, enriching the common legend of our American past." Critic Janet Maslin wrote of Jeannette Walls in The New York Times, "She has managed to make her second book almost as inviting as her first, even though its upright heroine is never as startling as Ms. Walls’s parents were."
