= List of awards and nominations received by Brie Larson =

Brie Larson awards and nominations
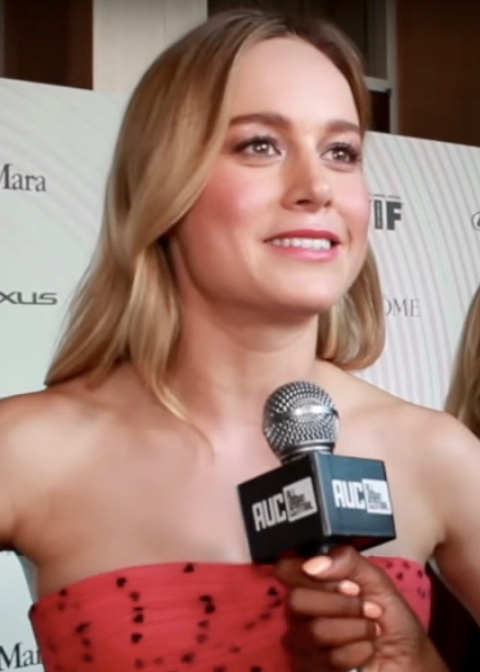
- Larson at the 2018 Women in Film Crystal + Lucy Awards
Awards and nominations
Award	Wins	Nominations
Academy Awards	1	1
Actor Awards	1	2
BAFTA Awards	1	2
Primetime Emmy Awards	1	3
Golden Globe Awards	1	2
Critics' Choice Awards	1	4

Totals (Note: Certain award groups do not simply award one winner. They acknowledge several different recipients, have runners-up, and have third place. Since this is a specific recognition and is different from losing an award, runner-up mentions are considered wins in this award tally. For simplification and to avoid errors, each award in this list has been presumed to have had a prior nomination.)
- Wins: 110
- Nominations: 224

Brie Larson is an American actress and filmmaker who has received various awards and nominations.

She began acting at age eight, and followed it with minor supporting roles in various films. Her breakthrough came with her critically acclaimed leading performance in the 2013 coming-of-age drama film Short Term 12, for which she was nominated for the Independent Spirit Award and a Critics' Choice Award. She garnered widespread acclaim for her performance as Joy "Ma" Newsome in the 2015 drama Room, for which she won the Academy Award for Best Actress, the Golden Globe Award for Best Actress in a Motion Picture – Drama, the Actor Award for Outstanding Actress in a Leading Role, the BAFTA Award for Best Actress in a Leading Role, and the Critics' Choice Movie Award for Best Actress.

On television, she played housewife turned chemist in the Apple TV+ miniseries Lessons in Chemistry (2023), for which she was nominated for the Primetime Emmy Award for Outstanding Lead Actress in a Limited or Anthology Series or Movie, the Golden Globe Award for Best Actress – Miniseries or Television Film, and the Actor Award for Outstanding Actress in a Miniseries or Television Movie.

== Major associations ==
=== Academy Awards ===
Year	Category	Nominated work	Result	Ref.
2015	Best Actress	Room	Won	

=== Actor Awards ===
Year	Category	Nominated work	Result	Ref.
2015	Outstanding Actress in a Leading Role	Room	Won	
2024	Outstanding Actress in a Miniseries or Television Movie	Lessons in Chemistry	Nominated	

=== BAFTA Awards ===
Year	Category	Nominated work	Result	Ref.
British Academy Film Awards
2015	Best Actress in a Leading Role	Room	Won	
2015	BAFTA Rising Star Award		Nominated	

=== Emmy Awards ===
Year	Category	Nominated work	Result	Ref.
Primetime Emmy Awards
2020	Outstanding Interactive Program	The Messy Truth VR Experience	Won	
2024	Outstanding Limited or Anthology Series	Lessons in Chemistry	Nominated	
2024	Outstanding Lead Actress in a Limited Series or Movie	Lessons in Chemistry	Nominated	

=== Golden Globe Awards ===
Year	Category	Nominated work	Result	Ref.
2015	Best Actress in a Motion Picture – Drama	Room	Won	
2023	Best Actress – Miniseries or Television Film	Lessons in Chemistry	Nominated	

== Critics' associations ==
Organizations	Year	Category	Work	Result	Ref.
Alliance of Women Film Journalists	2014	Best Actress	Short Term 12	Nominated	
Alliance of Women Film Journalists	2014	Best Breakthrough Performance	Short Term 12	Nominated	
Alliance of Women Film Journalists	2016	Room	Best Actress	Nominated	
Alliance of Women Film Journalists	2016	Room	Best Breakthrough Performance	Nominated	
Austin Film Critics Association	2014	Best Actress	Short Term 12	Won	
Austin Film Critics Association	2014	Bobby McCurdy Breakthrough Artist Award	Short Term 12	Won	
Austin Film Critics Association	2016	Best Actress	Room	Won	
Black Film Critics Circle	2013	Best Actress	Short Term 12	Won	
Black Film Critics Circle	2016	Best Actress	Room	Won	
Boston Online Film Critics Association	2014	Best Actress	Short Term 12	Runner-up	
Boston Online Film Critics Association	2016	Best Actress	Room	Runner-up	
Chicago Film Critics Association	2013	Best Actress	Short Term 12	Nominated	
Chicago Film Critics Association	2015	Best Actress	Room	Won	
Chlotrudis Society for Independent Film Awards	2014	Best Actress	Short Term 12	Won	
Central-Ohio Film Critics Association	2014	Best Breakthrough Artist	Short Term 12	Nominated	
Central-Ohio Film Critics Association	2014	Best Actress	Short Term 12	Nominated	
Central-Ohio Film Critics Association	2016	Best Actress	Room	Won	
Critics' Choice Awards	2014	Best Movie Actress	Short Term 12	Nominated	
Critics' Choice Awards	2016	Best Movie Actress	Room	Won	
Critics' Choice Awards	2023	Best Movie/Miniseries	Lessons in Chemistry	Nominated	
Critics' Choice Awards	2023	Best Actress in a Movie/Miniseries	Lessons in Chemistry	Nominated	
Dallas–Fort Worth Film Critics Association	2016	Best Actress	Room	Won	
Denver Film Critics Society	2014	Best Actress	Short Term 12	Nominated	
Denver Film Critics Society	2016	Best Actress	Room	Won	
Detroit Film Critics Society	2014	Breakthrough Performance	Short Term 12	Won	
Detroit Film Critics Society	2014	Best Actress	Short Term 12	Won	
Detroit Film Critics Society	2016	Best Actress	Room	Nominated	
Dublin Film Critics Circle	2016	Best Actress	Room	Nominated	
Florida Film Critics Circle	2016	Best Actress	Room	Won	
Georgia Film Critics Association	2014	Best Breakthrough Artist	Short Term 12	Won	
Georgia Film Critics Association	2014	Best Actress	Short Term 12	Nominated	
Georgia Film Critics Association	2016	Best Actress	Room	Won	
Houston Film Critics Society	2014	Best Actress	Short Term 12	Nominated	
Houston Film Critics Society	2016	Best Actress	Room	Won	
Indiana Film Journalists Association	2014	Best Actress	Short Term 12	Nominated	
Indiana Film Journalists Association	2016	Best Actress	Room	Won	
IndieWire Critics Poll	2013	Best Lead Performance	Short Term 12	6th Place	
IndieWire Critics Poll	2015	Best Actress	Room	3rd Place	
Internet Film Critic Society	2016	Best Actress	Room	Won	
Iowa Film Critics Awards	2016	Best Actress	Room	Won	
Las Vegas Film Critics Society	2015	Best Actress	Room	Won	
Los Angeles Online Film Critics Society	2018	Trailblazer Award	—N/a	Honored	
London Film Critics' Circle	2014	Actress of the Year	Short Term 12	Nominated	
London Film Critics' Circle	2016	Actress of the Year	Room	Nominated	
New York Film Critics Online	2016	Best Actress	Room	Won	
Nevada Film Critics Society	2016	Best Actress	Room	Won	
North Carolina Film Critics Association	2015	Best Actress	Room	Nominated	
North Texas Film Critics Association	2015	Best Actress	Room	Won	
Oklahoma Film Critics Circle	2016	Best Actress	Room	Won	
Online Film Critics Society	2013	Best Actress	Short Term 12	Nominated	
Online Film Critics Society	2015	Best Actress	Room	Nominated	
Online Film and Television Association	2014	Best Breakthrough Performance – Female	Short Term 12	Nominated	
Online Film and Television Association	2016	Best Actress	Room	Won	
Phoenix Film Critics Circle	2016	Best Actress	Room	Won	
Phoenix Film Critics Society	2014	Best Breakthrough Performance	Short Term 12	Nominated	
Phoenix Film Critics Society	2016	Best Actress	Room	Won	
San Diego Film Critics Society	2014	Best Actress	Short Term 12	Nominated	
San Diego Film Critics Society	2016	Best Actress	Room	Won	
San Francisco Film Critics Circle	2014	Best Actress	Short Term 12	Nominated	
San Francisco Film Critics Circle	2016	Best Actress	Room	Nominated	
Seattle Film Critics Circle	2014	Best Actress	Short Term 12	Won	
Seattle Film Critics Circle	2016	Best Actress	Room	Nominated	
Southeastern Film Critics Association	2014	Best Actress	Short Term 12	Won	
Southeastern Film Critics Association	2016	Best Actress	Room	Won	
St. Louis Film Critics Association	2016	Best Actress	Room	Won	
Toronto Film Critics Association	2016	Best Actress	Room	Nominated	
Utah Film Critics Association	2016	Best Actress	Room	Won	
Vancouver Film Critics Circle	2016	Best Actress	Room	Won	
Vancouver Film Critics Circle	2016	Best Actress in a Canadian Film	Room	Won	
Village Voice Film Poll	2014	Best Lead Performance	Short Term 12	4th place	
Village Voice Film Poll	2016	Best Actress	Room	3rd place	
Washington DC Area Film Critics Association	2014	Best Actress	Short Term 12	Nominated	
Washington DC Area Film Critics Association	2016	Best Actress	Room	Nominated	
Washington DC Area Film Critics Association	2018	Best Actress	The Glass Castle	Nominated	
Women Film Critics Circle	2015	Best Actress	Room	Won	
Women Film Critics Circle	2015	Best Young Actress	Room	Won	
Women Film Critics Circle	2015	Best Screen Couple (Note: shared with Jacob Tremblay)	Room	Won	
Women Film Critics Circle	2015	Courage in Acting Award	Room	Won	
Women Film Critics Circle	2019	Acting and Activism Award	—N/a	Nominated	
Women Film Critics Circle	2019	Best Female Action Hero	Captain Marvel	Nominated	

== Other associations ==
Organizations	Year	Category	Work	Result	Ref.
Australian Academy of Cinema and Television Arts Awards	2015	Best International Lead Actress – Cinema	Room	Nominated	
Awards Circuit Community Awards	2013	Best Actress	Short Term 12	Nominated	
Awards Circuit Community Awards	2015	Best Actress	Room	Won	
Black Reel Awards	2020	Outstanding Ensemble	Just Mercy	Nominated	
Canadian Screen Awards	2015	Best Actress in a Leading Role in a Motion Picture	Room	Won	
Capri Hollywood International Film Festival	2015	Best Actress	Room	Won	
CinEuphoria Awards	2013	Best Actress – International Competition	Short Term 12	Nominated	
CinEuphoria Awards	2015	Best Actress – International Competition	Room	Won	
Dorian Awards	2015	Film Performance of the Year — Actress	Room	Nominated	
DVD Exclusive Awards	2005	Best Original Music Video	"Hope Has Wings" (from Barbie and the Magic of Pegasus)	Nominated	
Empire Awards	2015	Best Actress	Room	Nominated	
Golden Schmoes Awards	2013	Breakthrough of the Year	Short Term 12	Nominated	
Golden Schmoes Awards	2015	Actress of the Year	Room	Won	
Gotham Awards	2013	Best Actress	Short Term 12	Won	
Gotham Awards	2015	Best Actress	Room	Nominated	
Hamptons International Film Festival	2013	Breakthrough Performer	Short Term 12	Won	
IMDb STARmeter Awards	2015	STARmeter Award	—N/a	Won	
International Online Cinema Awards	2013	Best Actress in a Leading Role	Short Term 12	Won	
Irish Film & Television Academy Awards	2015	Best International Actress	Room	Won	
Independent Spirit Awards	2013	Best Female Lead	Short Term 12	Nominated	
Independent Spirit Awards	2015	Best Female Lead	Room	Won	
NAACP Image Awards	2020	Outstanding Ensemble Cast in a Motion Picture	Just Mercy	Won	
Nickelodeon Kids' Choice Awards	2019	Favorite Movie Actress	Captain Marvel / Avengers: Endgame	Nominated	
Nickelodeon Kids' Choice Awards	2019	Favorite Superhero	Captain Marvel / Avengers: Endgame	Nominated	
Nickelodeon Kids' Choice Awards	2023	Favorite Movie Actress	The Marvels	Nominated	
Nickelodeon Kids' Choice Awards	2026	Favorite Female Animated Voice from a Movie	The Super Mario Galaxy Movie	Pending	
Locarno International Film Festival	2013	Best Actress	Short Term 12	Won	
Maui Film Festival	2013	Rising Star Award	—N/a	Won	
MTV Movie & TV Awards	2016	Best Actor in a Movie	Room	Nominated	
MTV Movie & TV Awards	2016	Best Breakthrough Performance in a Movie	Room	Nominated	
MTV Movie & TV Awards	2019	Best Fight in a Movie	Captain Marvel	Won	
MTV Movie & TV Awards	2019	Best Hero in a Movie	Captain Marvel	Nominated	
National Board of Review	2015	Best Actress	Room	Won	
National Film & TV Awards	2019	Best Actress	Captain Marvel	Nominated	
Palm Springs International Film Festival	2015	Breakthrough Performance Award	—N/a	Won	
People's Choice Awards	2019	Favorite Action Movie Star of the Year	Captain Marvel	Nominated	
People's Choice Awards	2019	Favorite Female Movie Star of the Year	Captain Marvel	Nominated	
People's Choice Awards	2024	Action Movie Star of the Year	The Marvels	Nominated	
Santa Barbara International Film Festival	2013	Virtuoso Award	—N/a	Won	
Santa Barbara International Film Festival	2015	Outstanding Performance of the Year	Room	Won	
Satellite Awards	2015	Best Actress in a Motion Picture (Drama)	Room	Nominated	
Satellite Awards	2023	Best Actress – Miniseries or Television Film	Lessons in Chemistry	Nominated	
Saturn Awards	2019	Best Film Lead Actress	Captain Marvel	Nominated	
Seattle International Film Festival	2013	Best Actress	Short Term 12	Nominated	
Sundance Film Festival	2012	Short Film Special Jury Prize	The Arm	Won	
SXSW Film Festival	2013	SXSW Grand Jury Award	Weighting	Nominated	
Teen Choice Awards	2015	Choice Movie Actress – Drama	Room	Nominated	
Teen Choice Awards	2015	Choice Movie – Chemistry (Note: shared with Jacob Tremblay)	Room	Nominated	
Teen Choice Awards	2017	Choice Movie Actress – Sci-Fi	Kong Skull Island	Nominated	
Teen Choice Awards	2019	Choice Movie Actress – Action	Captain Marvel / Avengers: Endgame	Nominated	
Young Artist Awards	2001	Best Lead Young Actress in a Comedy Series	Raising Dad	Nominated	
Young Artist Awards	2004	Best Young Cast in a Feature Film	Sleepover	Nominated	
Young Artist Awards	2006	Best Leading Young Actress in a Feature Film	Hoot	Nominated	
Women in Film Crystal + Lucy Awards	2018	Crystal Award	—N/a	Honored	
