= The Glass Castle =

2005 memoir by Jeannette Walls

- First hardcover edition (2005)
- Author: Jeannette Walls
- Cover artist: Rodrigo Corral
- Language: English
- Genre: Memoir
- Publisher: Scribner
- Publication date: March 2005
- Publication place: United States
- Media type: Print & E-Edition
- Pages: 289
- ISBN: 0-7432-4753-1
- Preceded by: Dish: The Inside Story on the World of Gossip
- Followed by: Half Broke Horses: A True-Life Novel

The Glass Castle is a 2005 memoir by American author Jeannette Walls. Walls recounts her dysfunctional and nomadic upbringing, emphasizing her resilience and her father's attempts toward redemption. Despite her family's flaws, their love for each other and her unique perspective on life allowed her to create a successful life of her own, culminating in a career in journalism in New York City. The book's title refers to her father's ultimate unfulfilled promise, to build his dream home for the family: a glass castle.

The Glass Castle has received broad readership and positive critical feedback for Walls' balanced perspective on the positive and negative aspects of her childhood. It has not uncontroversially been used in some North American high school curricula; it was listed ninth on the Office for Intellectual Freedom's list of the Top 10 Most Challenged Books in 2012. Reasons cited for challenging the book's inclusion in public school curricula include "offensive language" and being "sexually explicit".

The memoir spent over 260 weeks in hardcover on The New York Times Best Seller list, and remained on the paperback nonfiction bestseller list until October 10, 2018, or 440 weeks. By late 2007, The Glass Castle had received many awards, including the Christopher Award, the American Library Association's Alex Award (2006), and the Books for Better Living Award.

The Glass Castle was adapted as a feature film, released in the summer of 2017, starring Brie Larson as Jeannette Walls.

== Plot ==
The Glass Castle is Jeannette Walls' memoir of her childhood to adulthood, documenting how her parents both inspired and inhibited her life. The book is told in five parts. The first part, "A Woman On the Street", documents her conversation with her mother, Rose Mary, who was squatting in an abandoned apartment in New York City, which pushed her to tell the truth and write this memoir.

Part Two, titled "The Desert", covers young Jeannette Walls living with her parents, Rex and Rose Mary, and her siblings Lori and Brian. Walls opens with her first memory, which takes place when she is three years old and is living in a trailer park in southern Arizona. She is engulfed in flames when attempting to make hot dogs over the stove, resulting in her going to the hospital and receiving skin grafts on her stomach, ribs, and chest. Due to fear of the mounting medical bills as well as scepticism of modern medicine, Rex takes Jeannette out of the hospital without permission or paying. A few months later, the children are woken up in the middle of the night and are told they are "doing the skedaddle" (skipping town). Their parents' nomadic lifestyle imposed by their avoidance of financial responsibilities results in the family frequently moving about to locations in various states including Nevada, Arizona, and California. As Jeannette grows older, she is more aware of Rex's alcoholism and its consequences. For her 10th birthday, she asks him to stop drinking, which he successfully does for a few months. Following his relapse, Rose Mary decides that since they have no money, it is time to move again, and she takes the family to their paternal grandparents in Welch, West Virginia.

Part Three, titled "Welch", covers approximately a seven-year period and documents Jeannette and her siblings' shifting perspectives on life with their parents from being one of adventure and whimsy to abuse and brokenness. While in Welch, the Walls children face bullying, sexual abuse, and hunger. Ultimately, Lori and Jeannette hatch a plan for Lori to move to New York City, with Jeannette following shortly thereafter. Eventually, Lori moves, and Jeannette joins her shortly, after finishing her junior year of high school.

In Part Four, "New York City", after experiencing the freedom and safety gained from no longer living with her parents, sister Lori offers to help siblings Brian and Maureen move to New York City. Three years after all the children have left Welch, Rose Mary and Rex decide to move to New York City. With little money, the parents fall behind on rent and become homeless. They find themselves at home amongst squatters in an abandoned apartment, and the Walls children discover who they are. Years later, Rex calls Jeannette and tells her that he is dying. A few weeks after they had met and talked about their adventures and struggles, he dies of a heart attack.

Part Five, titled "Thanksgiving", takes place five years after the death of Rex when the family gathers for Thanksgiving at Jeannette's country home where they toast to Rex.

== Reception ==
The Glass Castle was positively reviewed by The New York Times, Kirkus Reviews, Entertainment Weekly, The Atlanta Journal-Constitution, and Publishers Weekly, among others. However, several school districts have found the book's inclusion in syllabi to be controversial.

In The New York Times Book Review, critic and novelist Francine Prose wrote, "The autobiographer is faced with the daunting challenge of ... attempting to understand, forgive and even love the witch ... Readers will marvel at the intelligence and resilience of the Walls kids."

A review in The Atlanta Journal-Constitution compared Jeannette Walls to renowned 19th-century writer Charles Dickens, saying that "Dickens's scenes of poverty and hardship are no more audacious and no more provocative than those in the pages of this stunning memoir."

The Glass Castle spent more than seven years on the New York Times bestseller list and has been translated into 31 languages. In 2006, the memoir peaked on the list at No.10; however following the release of the film adaptation in 2017, the book became a No.1 New York Times paperback nonfiction best seller and held that position for 15 weeks. As of 2017, the book had sold more than 5 million copies.

=== Awards ===
The Glass Castle has received the following accolades:

- American Library Association (ALA) Alex Award (2006)
- Lincoln Award Nominee (2008)
- ALA Outstanding Books for the College Bound and Lifelong Learners (2009)

=== Controversy ===
The Glass Castle has also been the subject of public criticism, most notably in high school English classes.

According to the American Library Association, The Glass Castle was the seventeenth most banned and challenged book in the United States in 2010 and 2019 and the ninth most challenged book in 2012. The book has been challenged due to offensive language and being sexually explicit.

In 2012, in Traverse City, Michigan, the Traverse City Area Public Schools Board of Education removed the title from the curriculum of West Senior High School's 9th grade English honors class due to its "explicit language and references to child molestation, adolescent sexual exploits, and violence." In 2014 it was returned to the curriculum after the school board reconsideration committee voted to maintain the book.

In 2017, the book was challenged in Marshfield, Wisconsin, resulting in the National Coalition Against Censorship defending it, stating that discussing its themes including "poverty, hunger, bullying, assault, and alcoholism" will benefit the students. On March 1, 2017, the committee reviewing the case voted unanimously to recommend keeping the book in the sophomore English curriculum.

== Film adaptation ==
Paramount bought the film rights to The Glass Castle, and in October 2015 announced that actress Brie Larson would play Jeannette Walls in the movie adaptation. In August 2014, it was announced that Destin Daniel Cretton was set to direct. Naomi Watts and Woody Harrelson were cast as Rose Mary and Rex Walls, respectively, with Gil Netter producing. Filming began May 20, 2016, in Welch, West Virginia. The film was released August 11, 2017, to mixed reviews praising the performances while noting the film's overall uneven tone. It holds a 51% rating on Rotten Tomatoes.

== See also ==
- Creative nonfiction
