= Andrew Lanham =

American film screenwriter

- Occupation: Film screenwriter
- Years active: 2015–present
- Notable work: The Shack; The Glass Castle; Just Mercy; Shang-Chi and the Legend of the Ten Rings

Andrew Lanham is an American film screenwriter best known for his collaborations with Destin Daniel Cretton, including The Shack (2017), The Glass Castle (2017), Just Mercy (2019), and Shang-Chi and the Legend of the Ten Rings (2021).

== Career ==
In 2015, he began his career with a script for the drama film Boy21. In 2016, Lanham started a series of collaborations with Destin Daniel Cretton, by co-writing the screenplay for the religious film The Shack. A second collaborative effort with Cretton was developed in the same year with the drama film The Glass Castle. In 2017, he drafted the screenplay for the western film The Kid. In 2019, he wrote the script for Cretton's fourth film Just Mercy. In 2021, he gained notability when he wrote Cretton's superhero film Shang-Chi and the Legend of the Ten Rings. In February 2022, he was writing the screenplay for Harbinger, based on the Valiant Comics comic book series of the same name. In May 2024, he was writing the script for the Amazon MGM Studios film The Robots Go Crazy.

== Filmography ==
Year	Title	Ref(s)
2017	The Shack	
2017	The Glass Castle	
2019	The Kid	
2019	Just Mercy	
2021	Shang-Chi and the Legend of the Ten Rings	

== Accolades ==
In January 2020, Lanham's work on Just Mercy was nominated at the 9th Georgia Film Critics Association for the "Oglethorpe Award for Excellence in Georgia Cinema" and at the NAACP Image Awards for "Outstanding Writing in a Motion Picture". In September 2022, Lanham's work on Shang-Chi and the Legend of the Ten Rings was nominated at the Hugo Awards for "Best Dramatic Presentation, Long Form" and at the Ray Bradbury Award for "Outstanding Dramatic Presentation".
