= Brie Larson =

American actress, singer and filmmaker (born 1989)

- Larson in 2024
- Born: Brianne Sidonie Desaulniers; October 1, 1989 (age 37); Sacramento, California, U.S.
- Citizenship: United States; Canada
- Occupations: Actress; singer; filmmaker
- Years active: 1998–present
- Works: Full list
- Partner: Alex Greenwald (2013–2019)
- Awards: Full list

Brianne Sidonie Desaulniers (born October 1, 1989), known professionally as Brie Larson, is an American actress, singer and filmmaker. She played supporting roles in comedies as a teenager, and has since expanded to leading roles in independent films and blockbusters. Her accolades include an Academy Award, a Golden Globe Award, and a Primetime Emmy Award. Time magazine named her one of the 100 most influential people in the world in 2019.

At age six, Larson was the youngest student admitted to a training program at the American Conservatory Theater, and she began her acting career in 1998 with a comedy sketch on The Tonight Show with Jay Leno. She appeared as a regular in the sitcom Raising Dad (2001–2002) and experimented with a music career, releasing the album Finally Out of P.E. (2005). She subsequently had supporting roles in the comedy films Hoot (2006), Scott Pilgrim vs. the World (2010), and 21 Jump Street (2012), and appeared as a sardonic teenager in the television series United States of Tara (2009–2011).

Larson's breakthrough came as a social worker in the independent drama Short Term 12 (2013) along with supporting roles in the coming-of-age romance The Spectacular Now (2013) and the comedy Trainwreck (2015). She gained wider recognition for her performance as a kidnapping victim in the drama Room (2015), for which she received the Academy Award for Best Actress. She ventured into blockbusters with the monster film Kong: Skull Island (2017) and by starring as Carol Danvers / Captain Marvel in the Marvel Cinematic Universe, beginning with Captain Marvel (2019). Larson returned to television to star in the miniseries Lessons in Chemistry (2023), for which she earned a nomination for the Primetime Emmy Award for Outstanding Lead Actress.

Larson has co-written and co-directed two short films, and made her feature film directorial debut with the independent comedy-drama Unicorn Store (2017). For producing the virtual reality series The Messy Truth VR Experience (2020), she won a Primetime Emmy Award for Outstanding Interactive Program. A gender equality activist and an advocate for sexual assault survivors, Larson is vocal about social and political issues.

== Early life ==
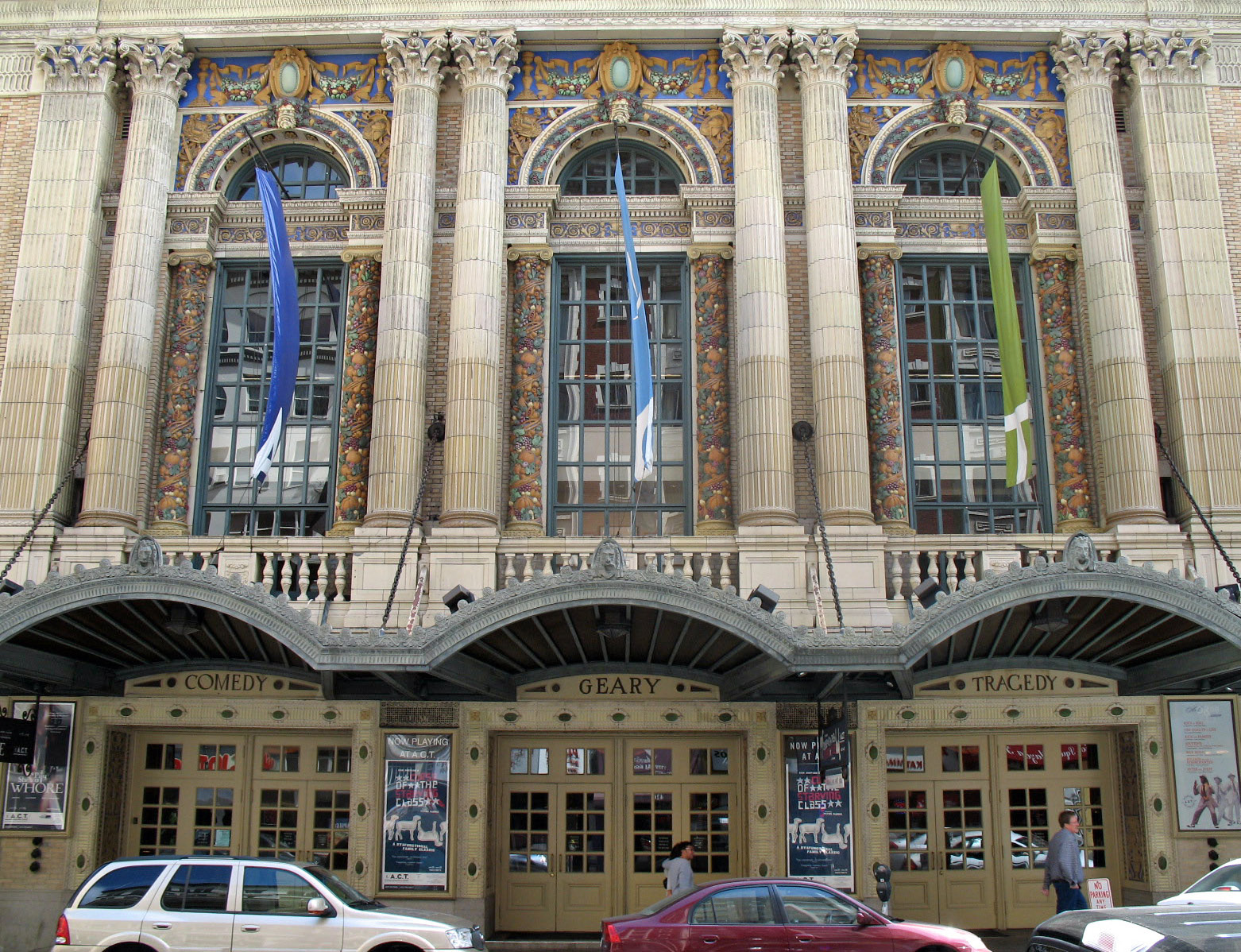
The American Conservatory Theater in San Francisco, where Larson was the youngest student admitted

Brianne Sidonie Desaulniers was born on October 1, 1989, in Sacramento, California to Heather (née Edwards) and Sylvain Desaulniers, homeopathic chiropractors who ran a practice together. They have another daughter, Milaine. Her father is Franco-Manitoban; French was Larson's first language. She holds dual citizenship of Canada and the United States. She was mostly home-schooled, which she believed allowed her to explore innovative and abstract experiences. Describing her early life, Larson has said she was "strait-laced and square", and that she shared a close bond with her mother but was shy and had social anxiety. During the summer, she wrote and directed her own home movies in which she cast her cousins, filmed in her garage. At age six, she expressed interest in becoming an actress, later remarking that the "creative arts was just something that was always in me". That same year, at age six, she auditioned for a training program at the American Conservatory Theater in San Francisco, where she became its youngest student. She has said she wanted to become an actress after watching Jennifer Lopez in Selena (1997).

Larson's parents divorced when she was aged seven. She had a dysfunctional relationship with her father, saying: "As a kid I tried to understand him and understand the situation. But he didn't do himself any favors. I don't think he ever really wanted to be a parent." Soon after their separation, Heather relocated to Los Angeles with her two daughters to fulfill Larson's acting ambition. They had limited financial means and lived in a small apartment near Hollywood studio lots at Burbank. Larson described the experience, "We had a crappy one-room apartment where the bed came out of the wall and we each had three articles of clothing." Even so, she has recounted fond memories of this period and credits her mother for doing the best she could for them.

As her last name was difficult to pronounce, she adopted the stage name Larson from her Swedish great-grandmother, as well as an American Girl doll named Kirsten Larson that she received as a child. Her first job was performing a commercial parody for Barbie, named "Malibu Mudslide Barbie", in a 1998 episode of The Tonight Show with Jay Leno. She subsequently took on guest roles in several television series, including Touched by an Angel and Popular. In 2000, she was cast in the Fox sitcom Schimmel, which was canceled before airing when its star, Robert Schimmel, was diagnosed with cancer.

== Career ==
=== 2001–2008: Early work and music career ===
"I was so insecure and so hard on myself back then. But there was a moment when I started doing the math. It took me two hours to get ready every day—hair and makeup, so many clothes, trying to make sure everything matched really well—and I had this intense epiphany. I realized how much time I was spending getting ready for life—I wasn't actually living it. It was the most terrified I've ever been in my life. So I went in the exact opposite way."

— Larson recalling her early career, 2015

Larson's first major role came as Emily, the younger daughter of Bob Saget's character, in the WB sitcom Raising Dad, which aired for one season during the 2001–02 television schedule. Hal Boedeker of Orlando Sentinel criticized the program and wrote that its cast members were "merrily joking through the show". She was next hired for the ABC sitcom Hope & Faith, but she and some other cast members were replaced after an unaired pilot. In 2003, she starred alongside Beverley Mitchell in the Disney Channel film Right on Track, based on the junior drag race star sisters Erica and Courtney Enders, and played minor roles in the 2004 comedies Sleepover and 13 Going on 30.

Larson developed an interest in music at age eleven when she learned to play the guitar. A music executive encouraged her to write her own songs, and she began self-recording and uploading tracks to her own website. After failing to get cast as Wendy Darling in the 2003 film Peter Pan, Larson wrote and recorded a song titled "Invisible Girl", which received airplay on KIIS-FM. She soon signed a record deal with Tommy Mottola of Casablanca Records; she and Lindsay Lohan were the only artists signed by the label at the time. In 2005, she released the album Finally Out of P.E., for which she also co-wrote songs with other songwriters, including Blair Daly, Pam Sheyne, Lindy Robbins, and Holly Brook. She titled it after a gym teacher she disliked and has said the songs she wrote were mostly about failed job opportunities. One of her singles, "She Said", was featured on the MTV series Total Request Live, was listed by Billboard in their weekly listings of the most-played videos in the channel, and peaked at number 31 on the Billboard Hot Single Sales. Larson went on tour with Jesse McCartney for Teen People's "Rock in Shop" mall concerts, opened for him during his Beautiful Soul tour, and also performed in New York City at the Macy's Thanksgiving Day Parade. Even so, the album was not a success, selling only 3,500 copies. Larson later admitted to being disillusioned with her music career, saying, "I wanted to write all my own songs, and [the recording company] were afraid of that. I wanted to wear sneakers and play my guitar—they wanted heels and wind blown hair."

In 2006, Larson was cast alongside Logan Lerman and Cody Linley in the comedy film Hoot, about young vigilantes trying to save a group of owls. It received poor reviews, but Ruthe Stein of the San Francisco Chronicle was appreciative of Larson and Linley for bringing "a dash of Indiana Jones to their roles". She had a small part, the following year, in the Amber Heard-starring drama Remember the Daze, and she launched an arts and literature magazine, Bunnies and Traps, for which she wrote her own opinion columns and accepted submissions from other artists and writers. Larson has said she frequently considered quitting acting at that point, as she found it difficult to find much work, blaming it on filmmakers' inability to typecast her. She was particularly discouraged when she lost out on key roles in the films Thirteen (2003) and Juno (2007). To support herself, Larson worked as a club DJ.

=== 2009–2014: Independent films and breakthrough ===
In 2009, Larson began playing Kate Gregson, the sardonic teenage daughter of Toni Collette's character, coping with her mother's dissociative identity disorder, in the Showtime comedy-drama series United States of Tara. Portia Doubleday was initially cast in the role but was replaced with Larson after filming the pilot episode. Reviewing the first season for The New York Times, Alessandra Stanley took note of how well Larson played a "real teenager" and Tim Goodman of the San Francisco Chronicle credited her for finding nuance in her role. Larson has said that her character's journey to find meaning in life mirrored that of her own, and she was upset when the show was canceled after three seasons in 2011. Also in 2009, she starred alongside Rooney Mara in Tanner Hall, a coming-of-age film about four girls in boarding school. Despite disliking the film, Betsy Sharkey of the Los Angeles Times commended Larson for providing "one of the film's funniest bits". In her two other film releases that year, she played a scatterbrained cheerleader in House Broken and a popular high schooler in Just Peck.

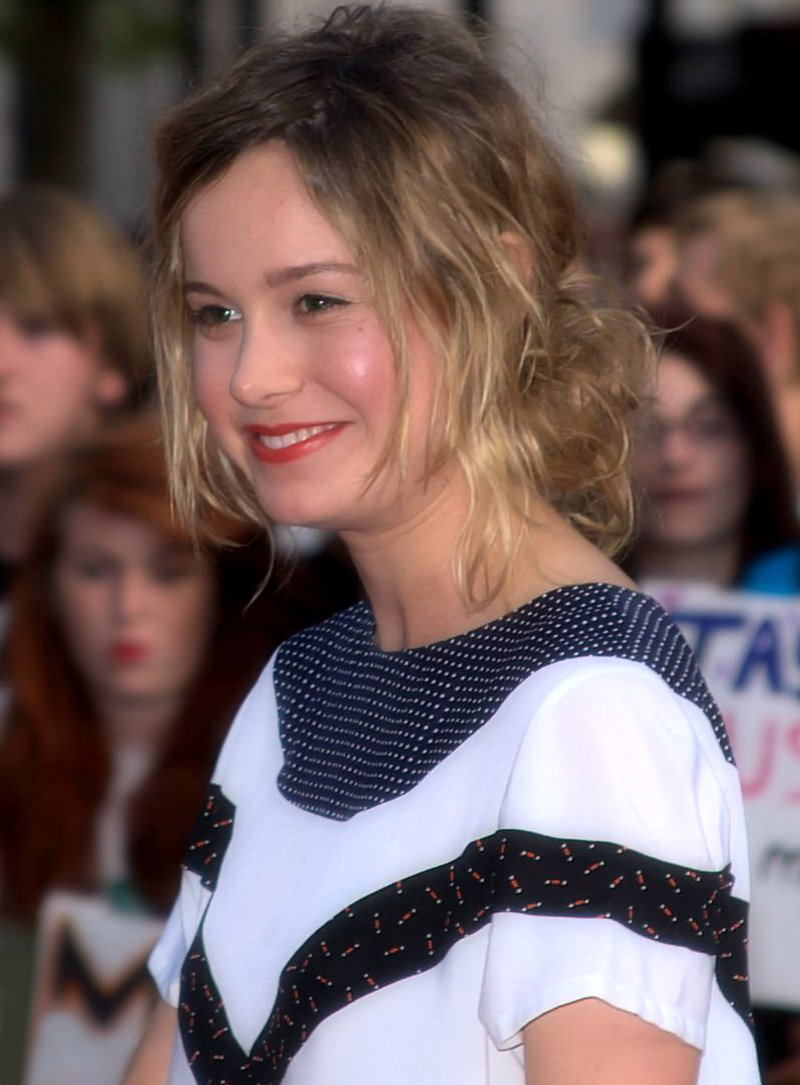
Larson at the London premiere of Scott Pilgrim vs. the World in 2010

At the Williamstown Theatre Festival in 2010, Larson appeared in a stage production of Thornton Wilder's play Our Town. Directed by Nicholas Martin, it featured her in the role of Emily Webb, a precocious young girl. Reviewing the play for The Boston Globe, Louise Kennedy thought the production had glossed over the play's darker themes and bemoaned the lack of tragic arc in Larson's character. In film, she featured in Noah Baumbach's comedy-drama Greenberg and Edgar Wright's comedy Scott Pilgrim vs. the World. A journalist for Slant Magazine opined that these films helped raise her profile, and Larson has said the latter film, in which she played a rock star named Envy Adams, marked a turning point in her career. In it, Larson performed the song "Black Sheep" with the band Metric. Although it did not fare well commercially, Scott Pilgrim vs. the World has since developed a cult following. She next played the troubled daughter of a corrupt cop (played by Woody Harrelson) in the drama Rampart (2011), an emotionally intense part she found herself unable to detach from. A confrontation scene between Harrelson and her proved upsetting for her; the director was surprised by how well it turned out and tweaked the script to further explore the father-daughter relationship.

In 2012, Larson expanded into filmmaking by co-writing and co-directing the short film The Arm with Jessie Ennis and Sarah Ramos. The film, about societal expectations in the near future, won a special jury prize at the Sundance Film Festival. She featured as a seductive teenager in the critically panned drama The Trouble with Bliss, after which she played Molly, a high school student, in 21 Jump Street, an adaptation of the 1980s police procedural television series, co-starring Jonah Hill and Channing Tatum. Larson found her acting style to be more rigid than Hill's approach and was challenged by scenes that required her to improvise with him. Dana Stevens of Slate labeled Larson "a find of major proportions", adding that "she's not only beautiful but funny, with a scratchy contralto voice, and unlike the usual female in a buddy movie, she comes across as a real person". With a worldwide gross of over $200 million, 21 Jump Street proved to be Larson's most widely seen film to that point.

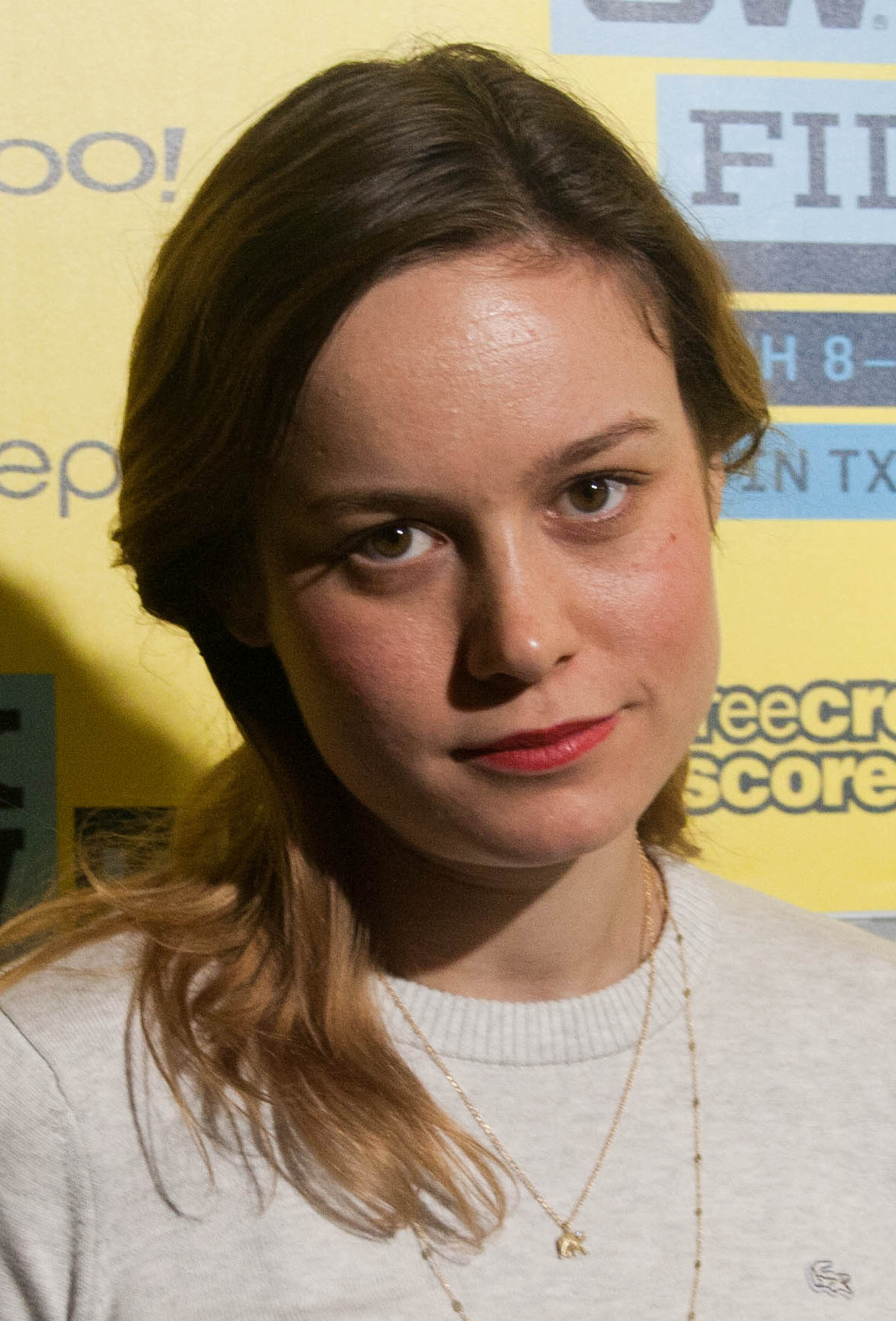
Larson attending a screening of Don Jon at the 2013 South by Southwest

Following an appearance in the sitcom Community, Larson collaborated with Dustin Bowser to co-write and co-direct Weighting (2013), a short film about a strained relationship, which was screened at South by Southwest. Larson's breakthrough came in the same year when she starred in Destin Daniel Cretton's critically acclaimed independent drama Short Term 12, which marked the first leading role of her career. Set in a group home for troubled teenagers, the film featured her as Grace, the emotionally distressed supervisor of the institution. To prepare, Larson interacted with staff in a children's home and watched online interviews of people with similar jobs. The film had a production budget of under $1 million, and she was pleased with its intimate and collaborative work environment. Larson's performance was acclaimed by critics. Manohla Dargis of The New York Times found her "terrific" and "completely persuasive", and Ian Freer of Empire stated that she "builds into a whirling dervish of a performance, making Grace strong but scarred, damaged but compassionate". Jenny McCartney of The Daily Telegraph predicted that it would "[mark] her out for a stellar career". Larson received a nomination for the Independent Spirit Award for Best Female Lead; she later remarked that the film prompted directors to offer her a wide variety of parts, but she turned down roles of the unidimensional love interest.

Also in 2013, Larson had supporting roles in two romantic dramas, Don Jon and The Spectacular Now. In the former, written and directed by Joseph Gordon-Levitt, she played the sister of Don Jon (played by Gordon-Levitt). Peter Travers of Rolling Stone praised the film's exploration of sexual themes and found Larson to be "terrific" in it. In The Spectacular Now, starring Miles Teller and Shailene Woodley, she played Cassidy, the ex-girlfriend of Teller's character. Larson was drawn to the realism she found in the project's depiction of high school experiences. Writing for New York magazine, David Edelstein called upon viewers to admire "the shading and intelligence she brings to Cassidy". The 2014 crime drama The Gambler, based on the 1974 film of the same name, featured Larson as a literature student who has an affair with her professor (played by Mark Wahlberg), a gambling addict. The director Rupert Wyatt felt the role was underwritten and cast Larson to lend heft to it. Even so, Claudia Puig of USA Today wrote that the "talented Larson is given little to do, other than react".

=== 2015–2019: Established actress ===
Larson had three film releases in 2015. Her first appearance was in Digging for Fire, a largely improvised ensemble comedy-drama featuring Jake Johnson in the lead role. Filming took place without a script and Larson made several on-set decisions regarding her character's choices, including the removal of a planned romantic subplot involving her and Johnson. She next played the sister of Amy Schumer's character in the comedy Trainwreck, which was loosely based on Schumer's own life. Larson modeled her role on Schumer's sister, who served as an associate producer on the film. Tim Grierson of Screen International labeled the film "a deft blend of laughs, romance and poignancy" and found Larson to be "lively, [but] slightly underused". Trainwreck grossed over $140 million against a $35 million budget.

Larson then starred in Room, a film adaptation of Emma Donoghue's novel of the same name. It featured her as Ma, a young woman held in captivity, who bears a child of rape. The role proved physically and emotionally taxing for her, and she modeled it on her mother's struggle as a single parent. A large portion of the film was shot inside a 10 ft × 10 ft shed created in a studio, and Larson prepared herself by spending a month isolated in her apartment. She interacted with specialists on sexual abuse and researched the lack of nutrition that a person in captivity would suffer. To achieve the look, she stayed away from sunlight, modified her diet, and exercised extensively to lose weight. Larson collaborated closely with co-star Jacob Tremblay, who played her son, and spent time performing activities that mirrored those of their characters. Room was critically acclaimed, with major emphasis on the performances of Larson and Tremblay. Kenneth Turan of the Los Angeles Times called her performance "astonishing", stating that the "reality and preternatural commitment she brings to Ma is piercingly honest from start to finish, as scaldingly emotional a performance as anyone could wish for". She won several awards, including the Academy Award for Best Actress, as well as a Golden Globe and BAFTA in the same category.

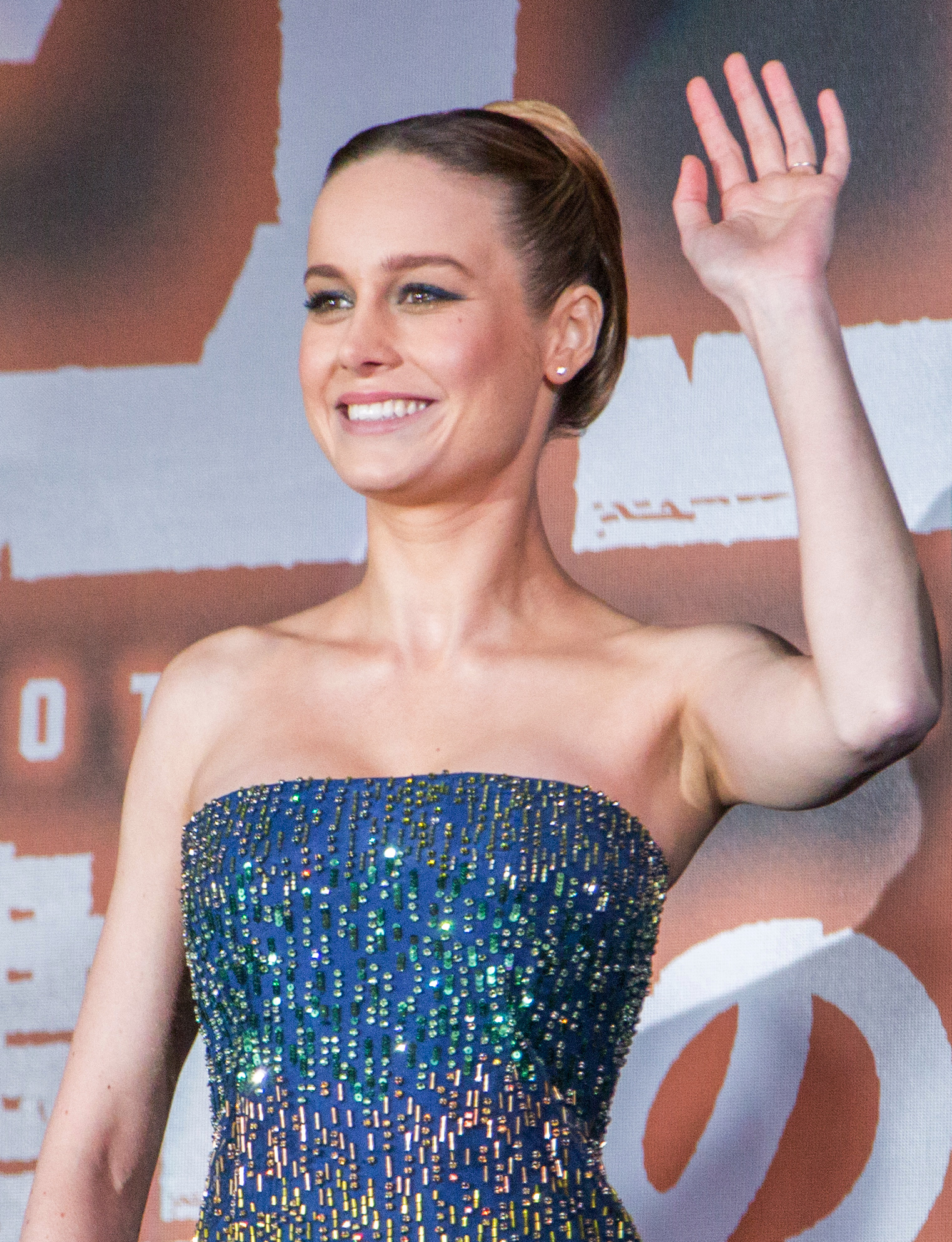
Larson at the Japan premiere of Kong: Skull Island in 2017

Following the success of Room, Larson played a leading role in Free Fire (2016), an action-comedy about a shootout in a warehouse. She agreed to the project to call attention to gun violence. Eric Kohn of IndieWire noted how different Larson's role was from that in Room and added that her "businesslike demeanor once again proves her ability to command a scene with a single glare". Commercially, the film failed to recoup its $7 million investment. She had filmed a part in Todd Solondz's comedy Wiener-Dog, but her scenes were deleted from the final cut as Solondz found her character inessential to the story. The following year, Larson starred alongside Tom Hiddleston and Samuel L. Jackson in the second installment of the MonsterVerse franchise, entitled Kong: Skull Island. Shot in Vietnam, the film featured her as a photojournalist in the 1970s. It marked her first mainstream big-budget release, and while she was glad to play a role not defined by her looks, she bemoaned the lack of female co-stars. Ann Hornaday of The Washington Post praised the film's visual effects and remarked that "Larson manages to hold her own with very little to do". Kong: Skull Island was a commercial success, grossing over $566 million worldwide.

Later in 2017, Larson portrayed Jeannette Walls in The Glass Castle, an adaptation of Walls' memoir, which reunited her with Destin Daniel Cretton. It tells the story of a young woman's relationship with her nonconformist parents (played by Woody Harrelson and Naomi Watts). Larson was drawn to the complex depiction of a parent-child relationship and identified with its theme of forgiveness. She collaborated closely with Walls and her siblings and observed their mannerisms. Peter Bradshaw of The Guardian disliked the film's sentimentality but noted that "it is saved, just a little, by the robustness of Brie Larson's presence". Also poorly received was the India-set musical romance Basmati Blues, a project she had filmed in 2013, which received criticism on social media for its white savior narrative. The 2017 Toronto International Film Festival marked the release of Larson's feature film directorial debut, the comedy-drama Unicorn Store, in which she also starred. It was later picked for digital distribution by Netflix in 2019. She played a disillusioned art student fascinated with unicorns. Larson had unsuccessfully auditioned in 2012 to star in the film when Miguel Arteta was attached to direct. After the production was stalled, Larson was offered to direct and star in it. She was drawn to the fanciful narrative and found a connection between her character's journey and her experience as a director. David Ehrlich of IndieWire disliked the film but took note of Larson's potential as a filmmaker.

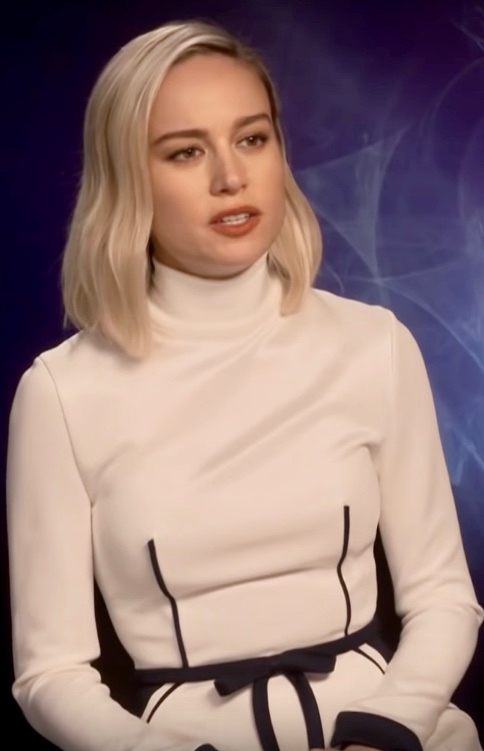
Larson promoting Captain Marvel in 2019

After a year-long absence from the screen, Larson starred as Carol Danvers / Captain Marvel in the Marvel Cinematic Universe superhero film Captain Marvel (2019), which marked Marvel Studios' first female-led film. She was initially skeptical about taking on such a high-profile role, but later accepted the part after viewing it as a platform to empower young women and found a connection with the character's flaws and humanity. In preparation, she underwent nine months of judo, boxing and wrestling training, and interacted with service personnel at the Nellis Air Force Base. Stephanie Zacharek of Time wrote that "Larson, a perceptive, low-key actor, carries the whole affair capably" and took note of how much she stood out in the film's quieter moments; David Sims of The Atlantic bemoaned the lack of depth in her role, but credited the actress for effectively portraying her character's struggle for independence from authoritarian men. Larson reprised her role in Avengers: Endgame, which she had filmed before Captain Marvel. Endgame grossed $2.79 billion worldwide to briefly become the highest-grossing film of all time, and Captain Marvel became the first female-led superhero film to gross over $1 billion worldwide.

Also in 2019, Larson teamed with Destin Daniel Cretton for the third time in Just Mercy, based on Bryan Stevenson's memoir about death row inmate Walter McMillian's wrongful conviction, starring Michael B. Jordan and Jamie Foxx. She agreed to take on the supporting part of Eva Ansley, an advocate for the Equal Justice Initiative, to lend her support to Cretton's storytelling. Owen Gleiberman of Variety took note of how well she channeled her character's "antsy, cigarette-smoking defensiveness."

=== 2020–present: Brief hiatus and career expansion ===
During the COVID-19 pandemic, Larson took a break from acting, stating that the roles she was being offered were variations of the one she played in Room. Feeling the need to recalibrate, she instead focused on personal interests such as podcasting and vlogging. In 2020, she produced and appeared in an episode of The Messy Truth VR Experience, a virtual reality series created by Van Jones, for which they won the Primetime Emmy Award for Outstanding Original Interactive Program. In 2022, Larson reprised her role as Captain Marvel for the Disneyland Paris theme park ride Avengers Assemble: Flight Force and the Disney Wish cruise ship ride Avengers: Quantum Encounter. She collaborated with Disney+ on two projects. She created, directed and hosted the docuseries Growing Up and starred in the augmented reality short film Remembering. She also featured as the character Paradigm in the online video game Fortnite Battle Royale.

After a three-year hiatus, Larson returned to acting in the action film Fast X (2023), which marked the tenth installment of the Fast & Furious series. Paste's Kevin Fox Jr. opined that she "shines when on screen, but feels wasted in a surprisingly small role". Larson once again played Captain Marvel in the superhero sequel The Marvels. It received mixed reviews from critics; its receipts were far less than those of Captain Marvel, and it emerged as a box-office bomb. She briefly voiced her role as Envy Adams in the animated series Scott Pilgrim Takes Off. Larson also served as the guest narrator at the 2023 Disney's Candlelight Processional at Disneyland.

Larson hired producer Lee Eisenberg to develop Lessons in Chemistry, an adaptation of Bonnie Garmus's novel of the same name. The miniseries, which released on Apple TV+ in 2023, is about chemist Elizabeth Zott who begins hosting a feminist cooking show in 1960s America. Serving as an executive producer, Larson spent two years working on the project, and was pleased by the rare opportunity to prepare for her character while the crew developed the show. Slant Magazine's Ross McIndoe took note of Larson's "commanding presence" and appreciated her ability to not turn Zott into a "caricature". She received nominations for the Primetime Emmy Award for Outstanding Lead Actress and Golden Globe Award for Best Actress – Miniseries.

Larson made her West End debut in 2025 at the Duke of York's Theatre in Anne Carson's translation of the Sophocles play Elektra. To play the title role of the vengeful Elektra, she got a buzz cut. She said that she accepted the opportunity to engage with "audiences who are not on their phones". Evening Standard's Tim Bano dismissed the production as an "impenetrable slog", but was appreciative of Larson for "bringing layers of bitterness, resentment and desperation to the lines". Writing for The New York Times, Houman Barekat was more critical, writing, "Larson, for all her energy, has a weirdly perfunctory, one-note intensity". In 2025, Larson released a cook book titled Party People: A Cook Book for Creative Celebrations co-authored with Courtney McBroom. In December 2025, Larson was a celebrity guest narrator at the Walt Disney World Candlelight Processional.

During the Nintendo Direct in November 2025, it was announced that Larson will voice Rosalina in the 2026 film, The Super Mario Galaxy Movie. Larson had previously expressed being a fan of the Super Mario franchise and the game Super Mario Galaxy in 2020.

== Advocacy ==
Larson is a gender equality activist and an advocate for sexual assault survivors. She has used her celebrity to speak out on social and political issues, asserting in 2018, "I'd put it all on the line and be an activist for the rest of my life because it doesn't feel right to me to be quiet." By 2025, Larson became less assertive in expressing such opinions, declining to engage in these topics.

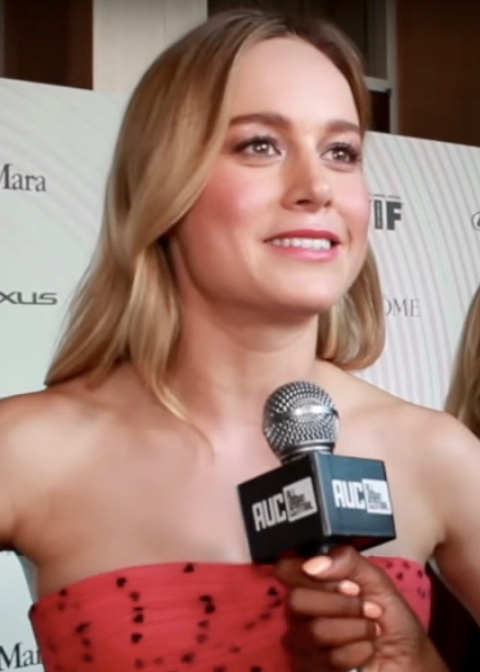
Larson at the Crystal + Lucy Awards in 2018

At the 89th Academy Awards, she presented Casey Affleck with the award for Best Actor; she hugged him but did not clap for him during a standing ovation from the audience. When asked if accusations of sexual harassment against Affleck made her do so, she said that her action "spoke for itself". In 2018, Larson collaborated with 300 women in Hollywood to set up the Time's Up initiative to protect women from harassment and discrimination. Later, at the 2023 Cannes Film Festival, where she served as a jury member, she evaded questions on Johnny Depp, whose film Jeanne du Barry was premiering at the festival, and who was accused of abuse by his ex-wife Amber Heard.

In 2014, Larson teamed with Alia Penner to launch Women of Cinefamily, a monthly program to call attention to films directed by and starring women, for the nonprofit cinematheque Cinefamily, in which Larson served as an advisory board member. In the wake of sexual assault allegations against two of the company's male executives, she released a statement in support of the victims and calling for action to be taken against the men. Larson joined the Academy of Motion Picture Arts and Sciences in 2016, and was later among the finalists for the organization's board of governors. In 2017, she was one of several celebrities to raise funds for the Motion Picture & Television Fund, a charity that offers assistance to elderly members of the industry, and co-hosted an event for the Women in Film organization, during which she urged filmmakers to be vocal against Donald Trump's presidency. She took part in the Women's March on Washington and condemned Trump's policies on transgender rights.

At the 2018 Women in Film Crystal + Lucy Awards, where she was honored, Larson bemoaned the lack of diversity among film reporters and called for better representation of minority voices in film criticism. She announced a twenty-percent quota for underrepresented journalists at the Sundance and Toronto International Film Festivals. Also in 2018, she became one of the first actors to incorporate an inclusion rider provision in her film and press junket contracts. In a 2019 interview, she remarked upon diversity among film critics and journalists, finding them to be "overwhelmingly white male", and supported diversity in the industry. This comment led to trolling and review bombing of the Captain Marvel page on Rotten Tomatoes. In 2019, she guest-edited an issue of Stylist magazine and used the platform to bring attention to diversity and social inclusion. At the Women in the World Annual Summit, she spoke out against the gender pay gap in Hollywood. Also in 2019, Variety honored Larson for her work with the Equal Justice Initiative. In 2020, she endorsed the "defund the police" movement.

== Personal life and media image ==
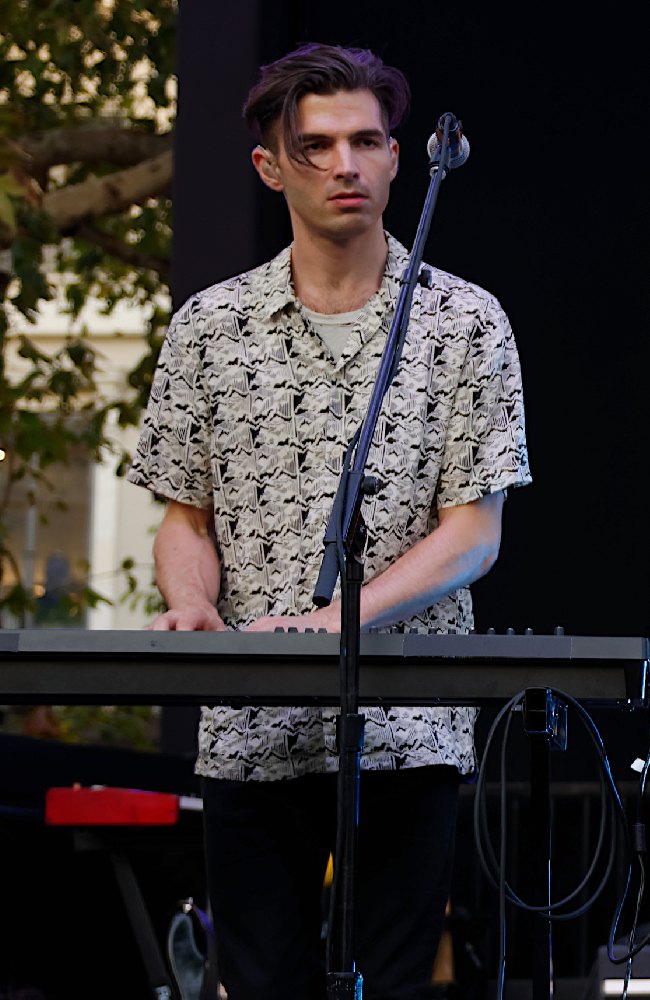
Larson was engaged to musician and actor Alex Greenwald from 2016 to 2019.

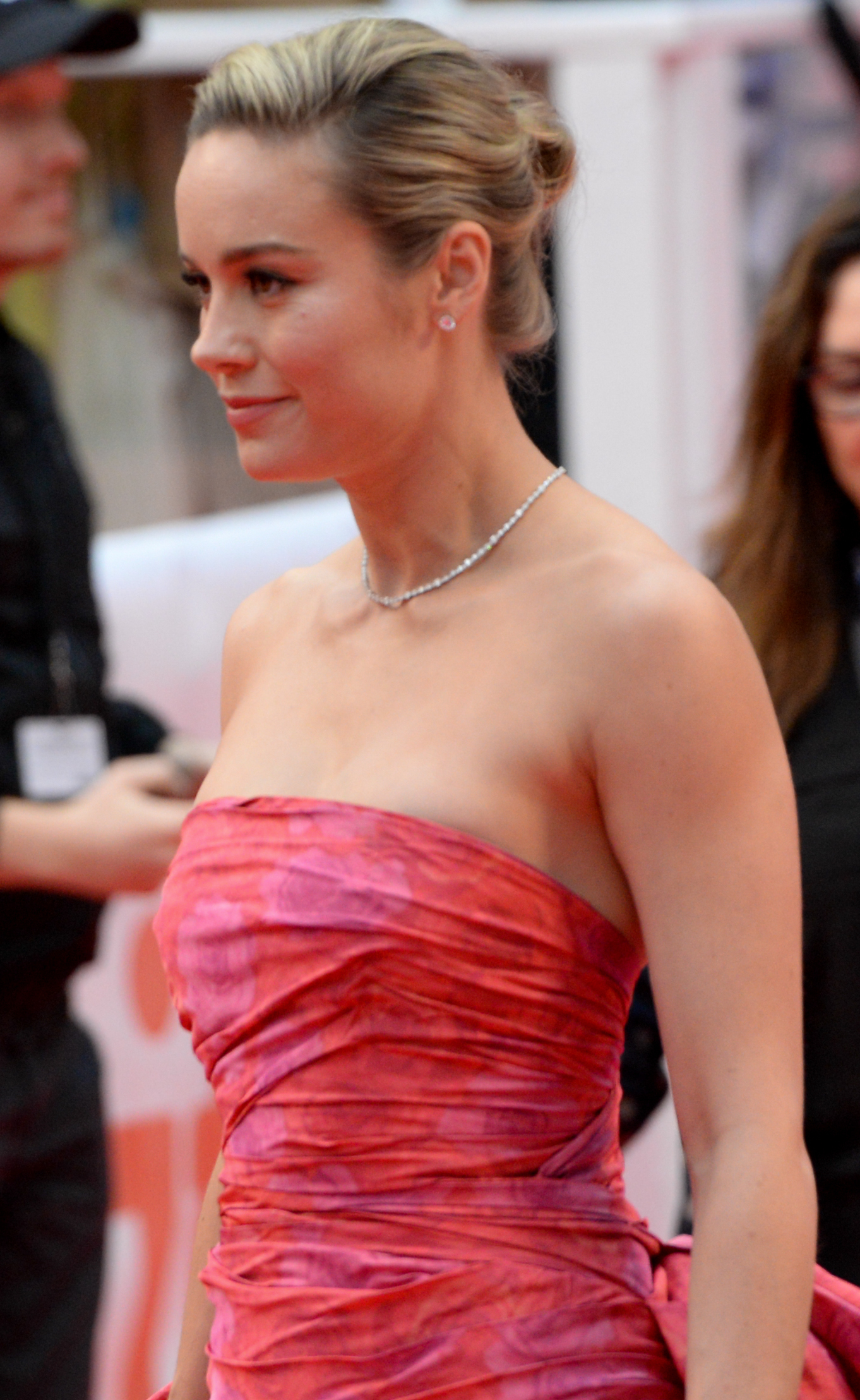
Larson at the 2019 Toronto International Film Festival

Larson is reticent concerning her personal life, and refuses in interviews to answer questions that make her uncomfortable. On her desire to be private, she has said she fears being judged for her flaws, and that the privacy allows her to play a wide variety of roles without being typecast.

Larson began dating Alex Greenwald, lead singer and rhythm guitarist of the Los Angeles rock band Phantom Planet, in 2013; the couple were engaged from 2016 to 2019. They lived together in the Hollywood Hills neighborhood of Los Angeles. She credited Greenwald for creating a safe space for her and for empowering her to take risks in her work. In 2019, Larson was in a relationship with actor-filmmaker Elijah Allan-Blitz. In 2023, she stated that she was single.

Describing Larson's off-screen persona, Holly Millea of Elle wrote in 2016 that she "carries herself like an athlete, lean and solid, surefooted [and] yet her energy is warm and familial, literally embracing". The writer Anne Helen Petersen finds her to be "incredibly warm" and adds that she is "a serious nerd, with the endlessly tunneling knowledge of a homeschooler". Jennifer Dickison of Porter states that Larson's "fully formed" personality made it difficult to categorize her into a conventional slot. The Daily Telegraph's Claire Allfree wrote in 2025 that Larson can quickly transform from being friendly to "prickly and unresponsive".

Larson has said she is interested in films that illustrate the "human condition" and which "make people feel more connected to themselves [and] the rest of the world". She is drawn to roles that differ from her own personality and which involve themes of social activism. Fan Zhong of W magazine has identified a theme of "sex appeal, inner torment, and a quick, playful wit" in her characters, while Allfree believes that she specializes in roles that are "marked by an unmistakable grit". Lenny Abrahamson, who directed Larson in Room, believes that her craft has "none of that showy intensity that sometimes gets all the attention" and has said that her "awareness of tougher lives" empowers her performances. Destin Daniel Cretton, who directed her in Short Term 12 and The Glass Castle, has praised her ability to improvise, stating, "I never know what's going to happen, and often she doesn't know what's going to happen."

Larson maintains an active social media presence and uses it as a platform to share opinions and posts that she writes herself. In 2020, she started her own YouTube channel. She also hosted a podcast named Learning Lots alongside actress Jessie Ennis. Larson was featured by Forbes in their 30 Under 30 list of 2016 and was included by People in their annual beauty list in 2016 and 2019. In 2018, she was named among the best American actors under 30 by IndieWire. In 2019, Madame Tussauds New York unveiled a wax statue of Larson as Captain Marvel. In the same year, Time magazine named her one of the 100 most influential people in the world.

== Acting credits and awards ==
According to the review aggregator site Rotten Tomatoes, Larson's most critically acclaimed films include Scott Pilgrim vs. the World (2010), 21 Jump Street (2012), Short Term 12 (2013), Don Jon (2013), The Spectacular Now (2013), Trainwreck (2015), Room (2015), Kong: Skull Island (2017), Captain Marvel (2019), and Avengers: Endgame (2019).

Larson has received an Academy Award, a Golden Globe Award, a Screen Actors Guild Award, and a British Academy Film Award, among other accolades, for her performance in Room. She also won the Primetime Emmy Award for Outstanding Original Interactive Program for producing the virtual reality series The Messy Truth VR Experience (2020).
