= Jeannette Walls =

American writer and journalist (born 1960)

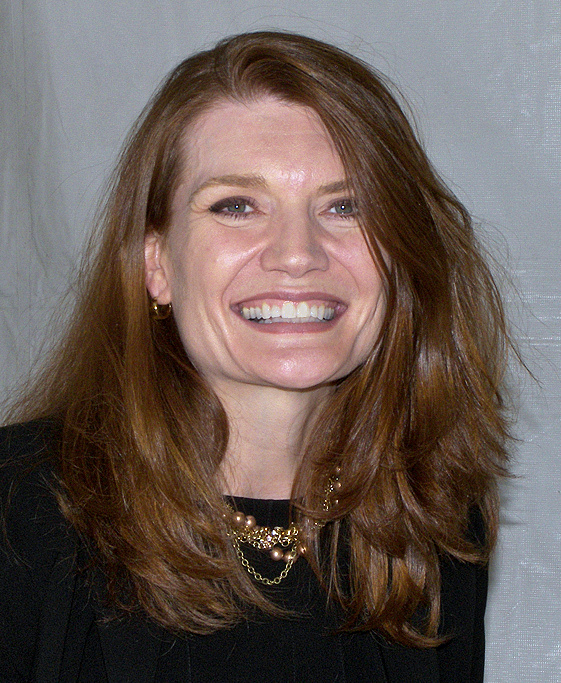
- Walls in 2009
- Born: April 21, 1960 (age 66); Phoenix, Arizona, U.S.
- Education: Barnard College
- Occupations: Author, columnist
- Spouses: Eric Goldberg (m. 1988; div. 1996); John J. Taylor (m. 2002)
- Writing career
- Genre: Nonfiction
- Notable works: The Glass Castle; Half Broke Horses

Jeannette Walls (born April 21, 1960) is an American author and journalist widely known as former gossip columnist for MSNBC.com and author of The Glass Castle, a memoir of the nomadic family life of her childhood. Published in 2005, it had been on the New York Times Best Seller list for 421 weeks as of June 3, 2018. She is a 2006 recipient of the Alex Award and Christopher Award.

== Early life and education ==
Walls was born on April 21, 1960, in Phoenix, Arizona, to Rex Walls and Rose Mary Walls. Walls has two sisters, Lori and Maureen, and one brother, Brian. Walls' family life was rootless, with the family shuttling from Phoenix to California (including a brief stay in the Tenderloin district of San Francisco), to Battle Mountain, Nevada, and to Welch, West Virginia, with periods of homelessness. When they finally landed in Rex's Appalachian hometown of Welch, the family lived in a three-room house without plumbing or heat.

Walls moved to New York at age 17 to join her sister Lori (then a waitress, Lori soon became an artist for Archie Comics). With the aid of grants, loans, scholarships and a year spent answering phones at a Wall Street law firm, she was able to earn a bachelor's degree in Liberal Arts from Barnard College. Walls graduated from Barnard in 1984 with honors.

== Career ==
Early in her career Walls interned at a Brooklyn newspaper called The Phoenix and eventually became a full-time reporter there. From 1987 to 1993 she wrote the "Intelligencer" column for New York magazine. She then wrote a gossip column for Esquire, from 1993 to 1998, then contributed regularly to the gossip column "Scoop" at MSNBC.com from 1998 until her departure to write full-time in 2007. Walls has contributed to USA Today, and has appeared on The Today Show, CNN, Primetime, and The Colbert Report.

Her 2000 book, Dish: The Inside Story on the World of Gossip, was a humorous history of the role gossip has played in U.S. media, politics and life.

In 2005, Walls published the best-selling memoir The Glass Castle, which details the joys and struggles of her childhood. It offers a look into her life and that of her dysfunctional family. The Glass Castle was well received by critics and the public. It has sold over 4 million copies and has been translated into 31 languages. It received the Christopher Award, the American Library Association's Alex Award (2006), and the Books for Better Living Award. Paramount bought the film rights to the book, and in March 2013 announced that actress Jennifer Lawrence would play Walls in a film adaptation. On October 9, 2015, it was reported that Lawrence had withdrawn from the film and would be replaced by actress Brie Larson. The film adaptation of the same name was released in 2017.

In 2009, Walls published her first novel, Half Broke Horses: A True-Life Novel, based on the life of her grandmother Lily Casey Smith. It was named one of the ten best books of 2009 by the editors of The New York Times Book Review.

Walls' second novel The Silver Star was published in 2013 by Scribner.

Her third novel, Hang the Moon, was published in March 2023 by Scribner. The Washington Post noted, "The main pleasure of 'Hang the Moon' is the hairpin twists and turns of its plot, so let's say no more about that. Walls has spun another rich story that spotlights, as she said in a 2023 interview, 'people with dreams and vulnerabilities, tough folk in rough situations.' Also, it's a lot of fun to read."

== Personal life ==
Walls married Eric Goldberg in 1988; they divorced in 1996. She married fellow New York writer John J. Taylor in 2002, and the couple now lives outside Culpeper, Virginia, on a 205-acre farm.

== Bibliography ==
- Dish: The Inside Story on the World of Gossip. New York: Avon Books, Inc. March 2000. ISBN 0-380-97821-0.
- The Glass Castle. New York: Scribner. March 2005. ISBN 0-7432-4753-1.
- Half Broke Horses: A True-Life Novel. New York: Scribner. October 2009. ISBN 978-1-4165-8628-9.
- The Silver Star. New York: Scribner. June 2013. ISBN 978-1-4516-6150-7. LCCN 2012050790. OCLC 827848933.
- Hang the Moon. New York: Scribner. March 2023. ISBN 978-1-5011-1729-9.
