= Basmati Blues =

- Theatrical release poster
- Directed by: Danny Baron
- Written by: Danny Baron; Jeff Dorchen
- Produced by: Monique Caulfield; Jeffrey Soros; Ruedi Gerber
- Starring: Brie Larson; Utkarsh Ambudkar; Saahil Sehgal; Scott Bakula; Tyne Daly; Donald Sutherland; Lakshmi Manchu
- Cinematography: Himman Dhamija
- Edited by: Tom Lewis
- Music by: Steven Argila
- Production companies: Red Baron Films; Considered Entertainment
- Distributed by: Shout! Studios
- Release dates: October 5, 2017 (American Film Festival); February 9, 2018 (United States)
- Running time: 105 minutes
- Country: United States
- Language: English
- Box office: $15,000

Basmati Blues is a 2017 American romantic comedy musical film, directed by Danny Baron, in his directorial debut from a screenplay by Baron and Jeff Dorchen. It stars Brie Larson and Utkarsh Ambudkar in lead roles with Scott Bakula, Donald Sutherland and Tyne Daly in major supporting roles.

The film was released in a limited release and through video on demand on February 9, 2018, by Shout! Studios.

== Plot ==
In New York City, scientist Linda (Brie Larson) produces the genetically modified rice 9 with her father Eric (Scott Bakula) for the company Mogil. One of Mogil's executives, Evelyn (Tyne Daly), in a press meeting, celebrates the rice's nutritional value as well as resistance to drought and pests. CEO Gurgon (Donald Sutherland) hires Linda as the new sales representative.

Gurgon plans to sell 9 in Bilari, India in order to corner the nation's rice market, and demands Linda convince the town's farmers to grow it. Although initially skeptical out of her ignorance of the country's culture, Gurgon threatens to cut lab funding if she doesn't do it. Linda meets a local son of a farmer Rajit (Utkarsh Ambudkar) on the train to Bilari, and William (Saahil Sehgal), an Agricultural Office representative, when she arrives.

William, in addition to flirting with Linda, is interested in the Mogil deal, wanting it to go through to be able to live in New York City and gain appreciation from his father. Rajit, to further his college education, plans to make money by selling a pest-deterring stink weed.

Linda continues to view more of India by riding in a car. However, the vehicle breaks down and the phone dies, meaning she has to walk out of her comfort zone and encounter Indian culture in person. There, she again meets Rajit, who initially, for fun, messes with her lack of knowledge of the Indian lifestyle. William invites Linda to a family dinner, which involves another accidental encounter with Rajit as well as more bonding between them.

Mogil has set a "Rice Exchange Day" for the local farmers to make contracts, and trade in their old seeds, with the company. They are quickly convinced of Linda's rice, particularly its ability to deter beetles, except Rajit. Suspecting a big multi-corporation wouldn't provide genetically-modified rice in good faith, he instructs the other farmers to not sign with Mogil right away, and schedules a contest the day before Rice Exchange Day for the farmers to determine if the rice or Rajit's stink weed is better. Rajit sets it up without informing Linda.

William, reading the contracts, is alarmed the farmers' work with the contract will be permanent, as well as the fact that 9's grain are sterile, meaning seeds would have to be bought annually. When meeting with Gurgon and Evelyn, they attempt to change William's mind by presenting the corporation as altruistic, and offer him a trip to New York.

William and Linda go out to a dance club during the night. Rajit and his sister Sita (Lakshmi Manchu) sneak in to dance with her, only for William to bribe the bouncer to kick them out. Linda stumbles on Rajit's farm and finds out about the contest. Initially she's mad at Rajit until her rice outperforms his weed at the contest. Linda indicates a lack of awareness towards the sustainability of the methods that will result from Mogil's contracts, which enrages Rajit. William bribes the authorities to arrest him over accusations of trashing Linda's lab.

The Rice Exchange Day goes as planned, until Linda publicly states the truth to the farmers. A revolt against Mogil, led by her, ensues. The local cops are also on the farmers' side and release Rajit, and William stalls the train out of a change of heart. As the train starts moving again, Linda uncouples it, William and Eric burn the contracts, and Rajit halts the train by parking his car on the tracks. Mogil's business plan is ruined, the farmers have their rice back, and Rajit and Linda are together.

== Cast ==
- Brie Larson as Linda
- Utkarsh Ambudkar as Rajit
- Saahil Sehgal as William
- Scott Bakula as Eric
- Tyne Daly as Evelyn
- Donald Sutherland as Gurgon
- Lakshmi Manchu as Sita

== Production ==
In January 2013, Brie Larson joined the cast of the film, with Dan Baron to direct, and Dan Baron and Jeff Dorchen to write the film. Filming first took place in 2013 in Kerala. It was originally set to take place in Tamil Nadu, but dry weather made the planned locations unsuitable so the production was forced to relocate weeks before it began. Not enough scenes were shot in 2013 because the last weeks of the production coincided with monsoon season and sets were damaged. A reshoot took place in 2015 and the post-production ended in May 2017.

== Release ==
In November 2017, Shout! Studios acquired distribution rights to the film. The film was released in a limited release and through video on demand on February 9, 2018.

=== Critical reception ===
On review aggregation website Rotten Tomatoes, the film holds an approval rating of 10% based on 29 reviews, the website's consensus reads, "Like the genetically modified grain at the center of its story, Basmati Blues is probably best locked in storage and saved for cases of cinematic famine." On Metacritic, the film has a weighted average score of 30 out of 100, based on reviews from 11 critics, indicating "generally unfavorable" reviews.

Critic Jeffrey M. Anderson summarized, "this attempt at an American-style Bollywood musical is earnest at best and sappy, naïve, and overly sweet at worst. It does have lively moments, but it mainly inspires aggravation and eye-rolling." Anderson praised Brie Larson's performance, but found her character too much of a pushover and easy to manipulate, contradictory to what a scientist should be. Anderson described the songs as "instantly forgettable, and it's frankly embarrassing when Sutherland and Tyne Daly are asked to step in and sing a villainous tune". Although respecting the film's condemnation of profit-over-people corporations, he still criticized the portrayal of Indians, describing them as "filtered through the Westernized views of uninformed tourists".

Rohan Naahar of the Hindustan Times said the "film is unbelievably and insultingly racist." He continues "this isn't the loving homage to Bollywood musicals that was originally intended. It isn't a takedown on global capitalism and the corrupt food industry. And it most certainly isn't a celebration of India."

=== Controversy ===
Upon release, the film was criticized on social media, as well as by film critics, for promoting a stereotypical depiction of South Asians and India. In particular, the trailer was perceived to play into the white savior trope common in Hollywood cinema, in which a white character helps non-white characters in unfortunate circumstances, a trope that has been widely criticized for being racially offensive. The film has also been criticized for being culturally insensitive, and promoting one-dimensional and simplistic portrayals of Indian culture. In response, the filmmakers have expressed regret that the trailer presented the movie as promoting such tropes, saying that the trailer did not adequately capture the spirit of the movie, and that the film was intended to be a homage to Bollywood.
