= The Glass Castle (2017 film) =

2017 American drama film

- Theatrical release poster
- Directed by: Destin Daniel Cretton
- Written by: Destin Daniel Cretton; Andrew Lanham; Marti Noxon
- Based on: The Glass Castle by Jeannette Walls
- Produced by: Gil Netter; Ken Kao
- Starring: Brie Larson; Woody Harrelson; Max Greenfield; Sarah Snook; Naomi Watts
- Cinematography: Brett Pawlak
- Edited by: Nat Sanders
- Music by: Joel P. West
- Production company: Gil Netter Productions
- Distributed by: Lionsgate
- Release dates: August 9, 2017 (Manhattan); August 11, 2017 (United States)
- Running time: 127 minutes
- Country: United States
- Language: English
- Box office: $22 million

The Glass Castle is a 2017 American biographical drama film directed by Destin Daniel Cretton and written by Cretton, Andrew Lanham, and Marti Noxon. It is based on Jeannette Walls' 2005 best-selling memoir of the same name. Depicting Walls' childhood, where her family lived in poverty and sometimes as squatters, the film stars Brie Larson as Walls, with Naomi Watts, Woody Harrelson, Max Greenfield, and Sarah Snook in supporting roles.

The Glass Castle was released on August 11, 2017, by Lionsgate and received mixed reviews from critics, who praised the performances of its cast, particularly Larson, but criticized the emotional tones and adaptation. The film grossed $22 million in North America.

== Plot ==
As a child, Jeannette Walls lives a nomadic life with her painter mother Rose Mary, intelligent but irresponsible father Rex, older sister Lori, and younger brother Brian. While cooking unsupervised, Jeannette is severely burned. At a local hospital, a doctor and social worker question Jeannette's home life, but Rex distracts the staff and escapes with her. The family leaves town, and Jeannette is enchanted by Rex’s plans for the family’s dream house, a glass castle.

The family soon includes Jeannette’s infant sister Maureen, and remains on the move for years, eventually relocating to a dilapidated house in Utah. After Jeannette nearly drowns when a drunk Rex aggressively teaches her to swim, the latter assaults a lifeguard, forcing the family – now pursued by the law and with no money – to go to Welch, West Virginia, where the children meet their grandmother Erma and uncle Stanley.

Rex moves the family into a ramshackle house in the wilderness, living without running water, gas, or electricity. When the family has not eaten in days, Rex takes their remaining money to buy food, but returns home drunk after a fight. Sewing up his wound, Jeannette asks him to stop drinking, so he ties himself to his bed, successfully enduring withdrawal. Rex lands a job as a construction worker, so the family enjoys a comfortable Christmas.

The parents attend the funeral of Rose Mary's mother in Texas, leaving the children with their grandparents in Welch. The sisters discover Erma sexually assaulting Brian and attack her, but are pulled away by Stanley. When their parents return, Rex refuses to listen to his children about the incident. The family heads home as Rex resumes drinking, leading to a violent altercation with Rose Mary leading to hate making-out. Jeannette is unable to convince her mother to leave him, and the siblings promise to care for each other and escape their poverty.

As a teenager, Jeannette is drawn to journalism. The siblings have now saved enough money for Lori to leave for New York City, infuriating Rex; Jeannette prepares to do the same. Erma dies and, after the funeral, Jeannette is pulled into her father’s scheme of hustling his acquaintance Robbie at pool. When Robbie loses to Rex and inadvertently reveals Jeannette’s plan, she accompanies him upstairs as he attempts to rape her, but Jeannette shows the scars from her childhood burns and leaves.

At home, Jeannette discovers that Rex has stolen her savings, but escapes from home anyway. Attending college, Jeannette faces financial difficulties and prepares to drop out, but Rex arrives with a pile of gambling winnings, telling Jeannette to follow her dreams. By 1989, Jeannette is a gossip columnist for New York magazine and engaged to marry David, a financial analyst. During dinner with a client of David’s, she lies about her parents. On the way home, Jeannette spots her now-homeless parents dumpster diving; she later meets with her mother, who is dismissive of Jeannette's engagement.

Jeannette and David visit the rest of the family at the abandoned building where her parents are squatting. Brian, now a police officer, and Lori live comfortably, but Maureen has moved in with their parents. Rex and David drunkenly arm wrestle and David wins, causing an angered Rex to punch him in the nose, taking David's words of "I will take anything you throw at me, old man" as an invitation to do so. Returning home, David tells Jeannette that he wants nothing more to do with her parents.

Maureen calls Jeannette to explain that she is moving to California. At her engagement party, Jeannette discovers that her parents have owned valuable land – now worth almost $1 million – since she was a child, but chose never to sell. Furious at Rex’s refusal to admit to the pain he caused his family, Jeannette disowns him. Some time later, Jeannette is unhappily married to David. Rose reaches out to tell her that Rex is dying, but Jeannette refuses to see him.

At dinner with another of David’s clients, Jeannette finds the courage to reveal the truth about her parents. She later reconciles with Rex before he dies. The following Thanksgiving, Jeannette – now a freelance writer after divorcing David – celebrates with her family, reminiscing about Rex’s unconventional life.

== Cast ==
- Brie Larson as Jeannette Walls
  - Chandler Head as Jeannette Walls (age 8)
  - Ella Anderson as Jeannette Walls (age 11)
- Naomi Watts as Rose Mary Walls
- Woody Harrelson as Rex Walls
- Sarah Snook as Lori Walls
  - Olivia Kate Rice as Lori Walls (age 10)
  - Sadie Sink as Lori Walls (age 13)
- Josh Caras as Brian Walls
  - Iain Armitage as Brian Walls (age 6)
  - Charlie Shotwell as Brian Walls (age 9)
- Jack Haven (Note: Credited as Brigette Lundy-Paine) as Maureen Walls
  - Charlie and Noemie Guyon as Baby Maureen Walls
  - Eden Grace Redfield as three-year-old Maureen Walls
  - Shree Grace Crooks as Young Maureen Walls
- Max Greenfield as David
- A.J. Henderson as Grandpa Walls
- Dominic Bogart as Robbie
- Joe Pingue as Uncle Stanley
- Robin Bartlett as Erma

== Production ==
In April 2012, Lionsgate Films was reported to have acquired the rights to Jeannette Walls' 2005 memoir The Glass Castle and Jennifer Lawrence was in talks to star in its film adaptation. In October 2013, it was noted that director Destin Daniel Cretton was in talks to direct the film and re-write the screenplay with Andrew Lanham from a previous draft by Marti Noxon. In October 2015, Brie Larson joined the cast of the film, replacing Lawrence who had exited the film after a prolonged search for a male lead. In November 2015, Woody Harrelson joined the cast of the film as the father. In March 2016, Naomi Watts joined the cast as the mother. In April 2016, Max Greenfield and Sarah Snook joined the cast. In May 2016, Ella Anderson joined the cast.

Principal photography began on May 20, 2016, in Welch, West Virginia.

== Release ==
The Glass Castle was released on August 11, 2017, by Lionsgate.

=== Box office ===
The Glass Castle grossed $22 million in the United States and Canada.

In North America, The Glass Castle was released alongside The Nut Job 2: Nutty by Nature and Annabelle: Creation, and was projected to gross around $5 million from 1,461 theaters in its opening weekend. The film made $1.7 million on its first day and $4.7 million over the weekend, finishing 9th at the box office. The film made $2.6 million in its second weekend (a drop of 45.5%), finishing 12th.

=== Critical response ===
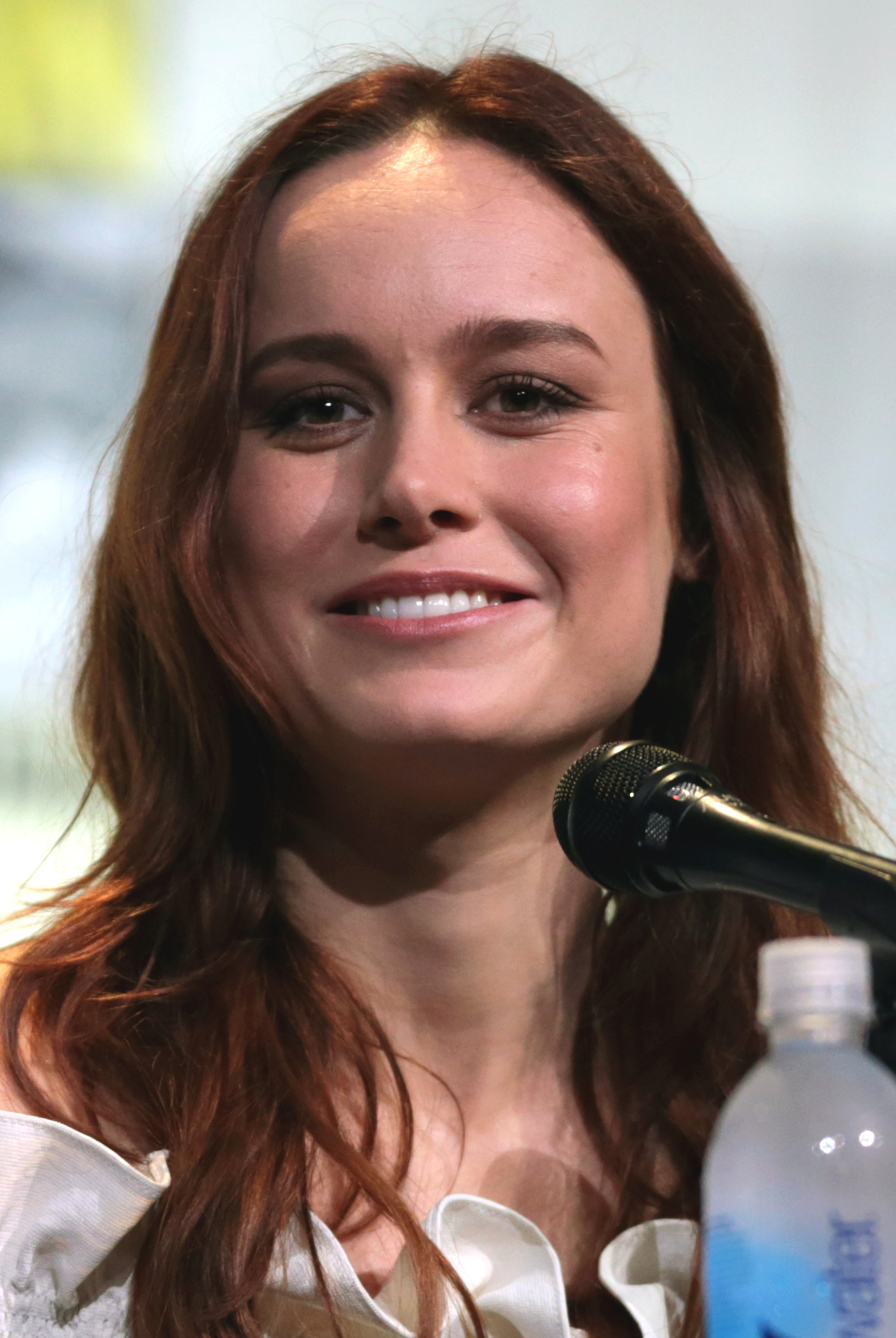
Despite mixed reviews for the movie, Brie Larson's performance as Jeannette Walls was praised.

On review aggregation website Rotten Tomatoes, the film has an approval rating of 52% based on 165 reviews, and an average rating of 6/10. The website's critical consensus reads, "The Glass Castle has an affecting real-life story and a hard-working cast in its corner, but they aren't enough to outweigh a fundamentally misguided approach to the material." On Metacritic, the film has a weighted average score 56 out of 100, based on reviews from 39 critics, indicating "mixed or average reviews". Audiences polled by CinemaScore gave the film an average grade of "A−" on an A+ to F scale.

Writing for Rolling Stone, Peter Travers said the film "peddles easy uplift instead of cold, hard truths" and gave it two stars out of four, saying, "Hollywood has a knack for sanitizing books that deserve better. In the case of The Glass Castle, it's a damn shame." Richard Roeper of Chicago Sun-Times also gave the film two out of four stars and was equally critical for its presentation, writing: "...a film that presents overwhelming evidence of Rex and Rose Mary as appalling human beings for 90 percent of the journey, and then asks us to give them a break? No sale."
