= Growing Up (American TV series) =

2022 American television series

- Presented by: Brie Larson
- Country of origin: United States
- Original language: English
- No. of seasons: 1
- No. of episodes: 10

Production
- Executive producers: Brie Larson; Nicole Galovski; Carri Twigg; Raeshem Nihjon
- Production company: Culture House

Original release
- Network: Disney+
- Release: September 8, 2022

Growing Up is an American television series on Disney+. The series was executive produced by Brie Larson.

== Production ==
The series was executive produced by Brie Larson and Culture House producers Raeshem Nijhon, Nicole Galovski and Carri Twigg. Galovski and Larson identified potential interviewees to appear on the series by looking through Instagram and local newspapers. Once they had identified potential candidates and discussed the themes explored in the show, they began looking for directors.

Each episode of the series focuses on a different adolescent who is paired with a director to tell their life story.

== Synopsis ==
The series follows the lives of a diverse group of adolescents between the ages of 18 and 22 as they grow up, and reflect on their experiences.

== Release ==
The series premiered on September 8, 2022 on Disney+.

== Reception ==
The series was mostly well received by critics. Decider gave the series a positive review, describing it as "relatable". Bruce R. Miller of Sioux City Journal praised the performance of the adolescents in the series and the presentation of their stories.

Joyce Slayton of Common Sense Media gave the series 4 out of 5 stars, writing that "Given life and color by the young people who survived their travails and learned something from them, the stories are deeply relatable and moving." Jordan Lyon of Ready Steady Cut called it "an emotional watch that should not be taken lightly."
