= Finally Out of P.E. =

Studio album by Brie Larson
- Released: October 18, 2005 (U.S.)
- Recorded: 2004–2005
- Genre: Pop rock; alternative rock; teen pop
- Length: 45:40
- Label: Casablanca
- Producer: Ric Wake, David Frank, Soulshock & Karlin, Michael Binikos, Peter Zizzo

Singles from Finally Out of P.E.
- 1. "She Said" Released: January 11, 2005; 2. "Life After You" Released: July 5, 2005

Professional ratings
Review scores
Source	Rating
AllMusic	2.5/5 stars

Finally Out of P.E. is the only album by American actress and singer Brie Larson, released on October 18, 2005, by Casablanca. The album features 13 tracks, some of which were co-written by Larson, and focuses on the ups and downs of being a teenager.

In an interview, Larson, then aged 16, stated, "I think that I write about stuff that others don't write about. I don't have a bunch of love songs cause I don't really have much boy experience. I just write about what I am actually going through in my real life. That's where the title from my album comes from – Finally out of P.E. My P.E. teacher didn't like me at all, which was hard to deal with cause I was usually such a teachers' pet. So when I found out I got my record deal, I was like, 'Yes, I'm finally out of P.E.""

The song "Hope Has Wings" was featured on the 2005 animated film Barbie and the Magic of Pegasus.

== Commercial performance ==
Due to many delays in release dates, the album was expected to be released in the fall 2004, However, the album was later released on October 18, 2005. The album sold a total of 4,000 copies in the United States.

== Track listing ==
Track listing
No.	Title	Writer(s)	Length
1.	"Life After You"	Blair Daly; Troy Verges	3:07
2.	"Whatever"	Alex Cantrall; Soulshock and Karlin; Philip "Silky" White	3:16
3.	"Shoebox"	Eren Cannata; Lee Horrocks	3:19
4.	"Falling into History"	Jessica Sheely; Peter Zizzo	4:11
5.	"Done with Like"	Brie Larson; Holly Brook; Jon Ingoldsby	3:46
6.	"Loser in Me"	Larson; Cantrall; Soulshock and Karlin	3:37
7.	"Finally Out of P.E."	Larson; Sheely; Michael Binikos	3:17
8.	"She Shall Remain Nameless"	Larson; Sheely; Binikos	3:41
9.	"She Said"	David Frank; Lindy Robbins; Pam Sheyne	3:44
10.	"Invisible Girl"	Larson; Binikos; Craig Bartock	2:42
11.	"Go Goodbye"	Larson; Binikos; Bartock	3:31
12.	"Ugly"	Larson; Binikos	3:29
13.	"Hope Has Wings" (bonus track)	Amy Powers; Dorian Cheah; Michele Vice-Maslin; Rob Hudnut	4:02
Total length:			45:42

Bonus edition
No.	Title	Writer(s)	Length
14.	"Go Your Own Way"	Mark Feist; Joleen Belle; Annet Artani	2:52

- All track titles, and writing credits appear courtesy of AllMusic.

== Personnel ==
- Executive Producers: Tommy Motolla & Bruce Carbone
- A&R: Sal Guastella
- A&R Coordinators: Joanne Oriti & Chris Apostle
- A&R Administration: Barbara Wesotski
- Management: Brad Patrick & Randy Buzzelli for PMG
- Mastered by: Chris Gehringer at Sterling Sound
- Art Direction: Sandy Brummels
- Design: Joe Spix
- Photography: Tony Duran

All credits appear courtesy of AllMusic.

== Recording locations ==
- Tracks 01, 03, 05, 10, 11, 14 recorded at Cove City Sound Studios, Glen Cove, NY
- Tracks 02, 06 recorded at Soulpower Studios, Los Angeles, CA
- Track 04 recorded at Big Baby Recording, LLC, New York, NY
- Tracks 07, 08, 12 recorded at Westlake Audio, Hollywood, CA
- Track 09 recorded at Canyon Reverb Studio, Topanga, CA
- Track 13 recorded at The Poolhouse, Long Island, NY and The Village Recorder, Los Angeles, CA
