= Evidence of Things Not Seen =

Evidence of Things Not Seen is quoted from Verse 1 of Hebrews 11. It may also refer to:

- Evidence of Things Not Seen (Gabriel Teodros album)
- Evidence of Things Not Seen (McCallum and Tarry), 2008 art installation
- Evidence of Things Not Seen (song cycle), song cycle by Ned Rorem
- Evidence of Things Not Seen (The West Wing), television episode
- The Evidence of Things Not Seen, essay by James Baldwin
- The Evidence of Things Not Seen (autobiography), autobiography by W. H. Murray
