= The Price of the Ticket =

1985 essay collection by James Baldwin

- First edition
- Author: James Baldwin
- Language: English
- Genre: Essays
- Publisher: St. Martin's Press
- Publication date: 1985
- Publication place: United States
- Pages: 704
- ISBN: 0-312-64306-3

The Price of the Ticket is an anthology collecting nonfiction essays by James Baldwin. Spanning the years 1948 to 1985, the essays offer Baldwin's reflections on race in America.

The title was repurposed for the 1989 documentary film James Baldwin: The Price of the Ticket, directed by Karen Thorsen.

== List of essays ==
1. Introduction: The Price of the Ticket
2. The Harlem Ghetto (Note: Originally published in Notes of a Native Son (1955))
3. Lockridge: "The American Myth"
4. Journey to Atlanta
5. Everybody's Protest Novel
6. Encounter on the Seine: Black Meets Brown
7. Princes and Powers (Note: Originally published in Nobody Knows My Name (1961))
8. Many Thousands Gone
9. Stranger in the Village
10. A Question of Identity
11. The Male Prison
12. Carmen Jones: The Dark Is Light Enough
13. Equal in Paris
14. Notes of a Native Son
15. Faulkner and Desegregation
16. The Crusade of Indignation
17. A Fly in Buttermilk
18. The Discovery of What It Means to Be an American
19. On Catfish Row
20. Nobody Knows My Name
21. The Northern Protestant
22. Fifth Avenue, Uptown
23. They Can't Turn Back
24. In Search of a Majority
25. Notes for a Hypothetical Novel
26. The Dangerous Road Before Martin Luther King
27. East River, Downtown
28. Alas, Poor Richard
29. The Black Boy Looks at the White Boy
30. The New Lost Generation
31. The Creative Process
32. Color
33. A Talk to Teachers
34. The Fire Next Time (Note: Originally published as a book-length essay)
35. Nothing Personal
36. Words of a Native Son
37. The American Dream and the American Negro
38. White Man's Guilt
39. A Report from Occupied Territory
40. Negroes Are Anti-Semitic Because They're Anti-White
41. White Racism or World Community?
42. Sweet Lorraine
43. No Name in the Street
44. A Review Of Roots
45. The Devil Finds Work
46. An Open Letter to Mr. Carter
47. Every Good-Bye Ain't Gone
48. If Black English Isn't a Language, Then Tell Me, What Is?
49. An Open Letter to the Born Again
50. Dark Days
51. Notes on the House of Bondage
52. Here Be Dragons
