= Tell Me How Long the Train's Been Gone =

1968 novel by James Baldwin

- First edition
- Author: James Baldwin
- Language: English
- Genre: Novel
- Publisher: Dial
- Publication date: 1968
- Publication place: United States

Tell Me How Long the Train's Been Gone is James Baldwin's fourth novel, first published in 1968.

== Plot ==
Leo Proudhammer, an African-American actor who grew up in Harlem and later moved into Greenwich Village, has a heart attack while on stage. This event creates the present tense setting for the novel, which is mostly narrated in retrospect, explaining each relationship with a story from the actor's life.

Barbara, a white woman, and Leo, a black man, are artistic partners for life—sometimes sexual partners, sometimes not. Jerry, their white friend, was Barbara's partner for a while before Barbara revealed her love for Leo. Their life stories are intertwined, but not joined, both because of the racial pressures of society and Leo's bisexuality. One of Leo's lovers, "Black Christopher", is a significant political and emotional figure in the novel. Christopher's friends are all African-American, and his life centers on the struggle for racial justice. Barbara and Christopher have one sexual encounter, but, like much of the sex in the book, it is exploratory and only significant for what it reveals to each of them.

Barbara, Leo, and Christopher remain friends throughout the novel. Caleb, Leo's brother, a World War II vet, was falsely imprisoned when he was a young man, and eventually conquers his anger at white society through his conversion to fundamentalist Christianity. He judges Leo harshly for choosing "the world" over "the kingdom of God". Caleb's religion painfully isolates him from Leo. Black Christopher, the foil for Caleb, advocates violent revolution as the means for creating a just society. Leo recovers from his heart attack and returns to the stage at the end of the novel.

== Characters ==
- Leo Proudhammer, the protagonist, is an actor who grew up in Harlem.
- Leo's father
- Caleb, Leo's brother.
- Barbara, a white girl from Kentucky.
- Jerry, a white man of Italian extraction.
- Christopher, a young African-American activist.

== Major themes ==
- Institutional racism
- Incarceration as a means of preserving economic and racial inequality
- White privilege
- Bisexuality and sexual exploration
- Impact of racism on military/civilian life in World War II
- Fundamentalist Christianity
- Homosexuality
- Racism. Among other issues, the novel touches upon the mathematics of blood in racism. when Caleb Proudhammer says, "Our mama is almost white, but that don't make her white. You got to be all white to be white.".

== Literary significance and criticism ==
Upon its publication, Tell Me How Long the Train's Been Gone received largely negative reviews. White male critics, such as Mario Puzo, tended to suggest that Baldwin's politics had compromised its literary merits. Puzo's review for The New York Times, called the book "simpleminded" and argued that a "propaganda novel" cannot be called art. The "absolute inadequacy and overall misguided nature of this initial response" has been discussed by Lynn O. Scott, who wrote that this contemporary critical reception reflected white Americans' decreasing sympathy with the Civil Rights movement during the late 1960s in the face of increasing militancy and assertions of Black Power, with which Baldwin was associated.

Scott contends that the novel has been unjustly dismissed, alongside Baldwin's other later novels If Beale Street Could Talk and Just Above My Head, as less interesting and complex than Baldwin's earlier works. However, she argues that these novels build upon, revise, and refocus his previous considerations of racial and sexual identity in America by "exploring the sources of personal and cultural resistance to the pressures of a deforming context" rather than "mapping the experience of internalized racism and homophobia".

More recently, Omari Weekes has described Tell Me How Long the Train's Been Gone as "criminally underread", noting how the novel's descriptions of "the loneliness of being Black in a white room" and Leo Proudhammer's attempts to navigate being perceived as "too young, gifted and Black" continue to resonate strongly in the twenty-first century.
