= The Devil Finds Work =

Book by James Baldwin

- First edition cover
- Author: James Baldwin
- Language: English
- Genre: Essay
- Publisher: The Dial Press
- Publication date: 1976
- Publication place: United States

The Devil Finds Work is a book-length essay by writer James Baldwin. Published in 1976, it is both a memoir of his experiences watching movies and a critique of the racial politics of American cinema.

== Synopsis ==
The book opens with a discussion of a Joan Crawford film, which was the first movie Baldwin could remember seeing, and ends with a discussion of The Exorcist, which came out in 1973. Among the other movies discussed are Lawrence of Arabia (1962), Guess Who's Coming to Dinner (1967), In the Heat of the Night (1967) and The Defiant Ones (1958).

== See also ==
- African-American representation in Hollywood
- Film criticism
