= Stranger in the Village =

1953 essay by James Baldwin

- Author: James Baldwin
- Language: English
- Published: 1953
- Publisher: Harper's Magazine
- Publication place: United States

"Stranger in the Village" is an essay by African-American novelist James Baldwin about his experiences in Leukerbad, Switzerland, after he nearly suffered a breakdown. The essay was originally published in Harper's Magazine, October 1953, and later in his 1955 collection, Notes of a Native Son.

In the summer of 1951, Baldwin almost suffered a breakdown, for which his partner, Swiss painter Lucien Happersberger, took him to an established Swiss health-resort in the Valais Alps, known as Leukerbad. Baldwin declares that, while he is a stranger in the village of Leukerbad, he also feels like a stranger in the village of the United States of America as an African American.

== Summary ==
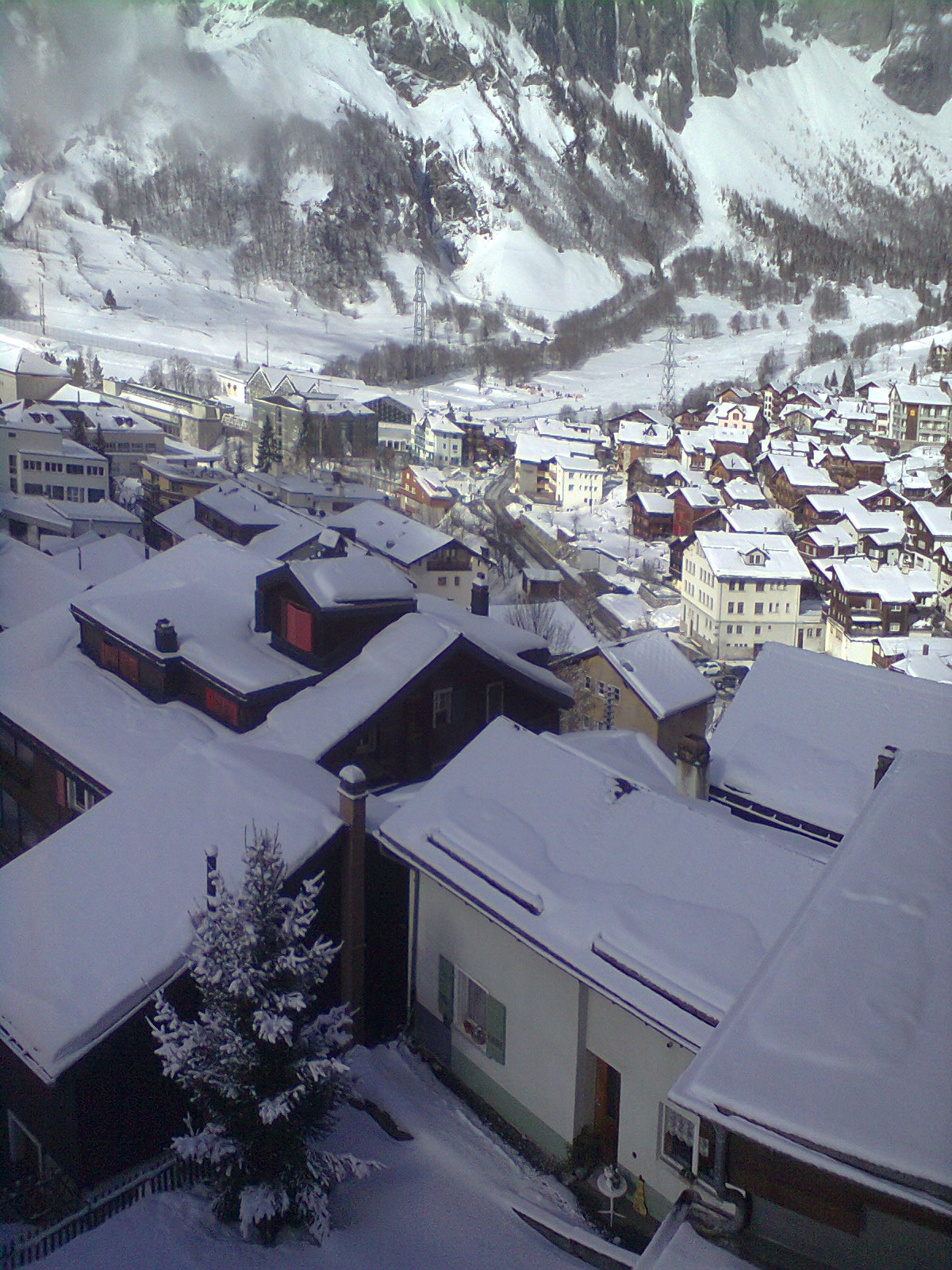
Leukerbad, Switzerland

Baldwin relates his experiences in Leukerbad, a small, isolated Swiss village, in the summer of 1951. Residents of Leukerbad were fascinated by Baldwin's blackness; according to Baldwin they had never seen a black man before, thus making him a stranger in the village."

Baldwin describes a kind of naive racism within the villagers: for example, children who shout "Neger!" when they see him, unaware of the echoes he hears from his past when others shouted a more damning word ("Nigger!"). The village has even ritualized an overt control of Blacks with their custom of "buying" Africans in the attempt to religiously convert them.

There is also a more sinister racism, even in a remote village that has direct experience with only one Black man: men who describe Baldwin as "le sale negre" ('the dirty Black man') behind his back and assume that he stole wood from them, or of children who "scream in genuine anguish" when he approaches them because they have been taught that "the devil is a black man."

This fantasy about the disposability of black life is a constant in American history.

Baldwin further goes on to explain the relationship between American and European history, by explicitly pointing out that American history encompasses the history of the Negro, while European history lacks the African-American dimension. Baldwin observes that in America the Negro is “an inescapable part of the general social fabric” and that “Americans attempt until today to make an abstraction of the Negro.”

Baldwin argues that white Americans try to retain a separation between their history and black history despite the interdependence between the two. It is impossible for Americans to become European again “recovering the European innocence” through the neglect of the American Negro; the American Negro is a part of America permanently pressed and carved into an undeniable history".

The final sentence in his essay articulates a defiant claim by Baldwin and an understanding that the villagers' and white Americans' need to reach, losing thereby what Baldwin describes as "the jewel" of the white man's naivete – in other words, white Americans' willful desire to ignore white privilege and the effects of centuries of racism and systemic discrimination against Black Americans: "This world is white no longer, and it will never be white again." Therefore, as Baldwin put it, “people are trapped in history and history is trapped in them.”

== Form and themes ==
Baldwin appears to be telling the story of his experiences in that tiny Swiss village. He uses the story as a metaphor for the history of race relations in the United States, describing the power discrepancy between whites of European background and African Americans who were forcibly brought to the US as slaves.

There are, no doubt, as many ways of coping with the resulting complex of tensions as there are black men in the world, but no black man can hope ever to be entirely liberated from this internal warfare-rage, dissembling, and contempt having inevitably accompanied his first realization of the power of white men.

— Stranger in the Village

Baldwin speaks of racism in the United States and in Leukerbad, Switzerland, drawing parallels between the two. This essay is autobiographical in nature, as Baldwin speaks of his own experiences. "Stranger in the Village", in many forms, is a protest against America for its treatment of African Americans, putting its racism on full display. In the essay, Baldwin raises questions of his own identity and how he fits into society in both the United States and in Leukerbad, where the family of his lover, Lucien Happersberger, had a chalet in a village up in the mountains.

== Reception and influence ==
The legacy of "Stranger in the Village" is tied to the legacy and reception of the book in which it is featured, Notes of a Native Son. The book is widely regarded as a classic of the black autobiographical genre. The Modern Library placed it at number 19 on its list of the 100 best 20th-century nonfiction books. Since Baldwin's passing on December 1, 1987, his writings have been published worldwide and are still known as essential emblems of the American canon. The French filmmaker Pierre Koralnik adapted the essay for television in Western Switzerland RTS, in 1962.
