= Connie Williams (Trinidadian) =

Trinidadian-American restaurateur and community organizer (1905–2002)

Connie Williams (1905–2002) was born in Port of Spain, Trinidad and moved to the United States in 1924. She was a restaurateur, culture-bearer, and community organizer. She opened the Calypso Restaurant in Greenwich Village, New York City, in 1943. The restaurant served West Indian cuisine in an ambiance of music from Trinidad. Among the early racially integrated establishments in the Village, it sponsored costume balls and galas throughout the 1940s and early 50s, often at Irving Plaza, off Union Square. it served as a Bohemian gathering place where intellectuals and artists could hear West Indian music and eat West Indian food.

Williams was a mentor for the young James Baldwin, who worked for Williams when he was 19 years of age, after moving from Harlem to Greenwich village when his stepfather died. In the early 1960s, after relocating to the West Coast, she opened Connie's Restaurant in the Haight-Ashbury section of San Francisco. She later moved her restaurant to the Fillmore District, San Francisco, after the Hippie movement in the Haight-Ashbury provided limited clientele.

== Biography ==
Little is known about Williams's early years in Trinidad. A devotee of calypso, she published a booklet in 1959 entitled "12 Songs from Trinidad" which included two songs about the British West Indian labour unrest of 1934–39 oilfield strike in Trinidad: 'King Flecky' and another based on the World War I calypso "Run Your Run Kaiser William".

In 1943 the Calypso Restaurant opened, first located at 146 MacDougal Street, and James Baldwin was hired as a busser and dish washer. The restaurant later moved to 51 MacDougal Street. Early in Baldwin's career at the Calypso he met artists, writers, and activists such as Beauford Delaney (the modernist painter who introduced James Baldwin to Connie Williams in 1943), Marlon Brando (then an acting student), and labor organizer Stan Weir (academic). With the encouragement and support of Williams and Delaney the young Baldwin developed as a writer and intellectual. Williams remained friends with Baldwin throughout his life, hosting a birthday party for him on 20 May 1963 at her San Francisco restaurant on Fillmore Street. Connie took the young James Baldwin 'under her wing'. Other artists, performers, and intellectuals who frequented The Calypso included Henry Miller, C. L. R. James, Tennessee Williams, Eartha Kitt, Paul Robeson, Richard Wright (author), Grace Lee Boggs, and Paul Robeson.

During and after the U.S. calypso boom which peaked during WWII, Williams promoted many prominent calypsonians and bandleaders in New York City—Gerald Clark, MacBeth the Great, Lord Invader, Wilmoth Houdini, The Duke of Iron, and others—whom she hired to play at holiday dances and carnival balls. These events also featured dancers such as Ismay Andrews and Pearl Primus.

In 1962 Connie founded Connie's West-Indian Restaurant in San Francisco's Haight Ashbury. The restaurant was a favorite for black intellectuals and, like her West Village restaurant, was frequented by James Baldwin when he came to San Francisco.

In 1969, Connie's Restaurant relocated to 1909 Fillmore St in San Francisco after the Hippie "invasion" of Haight-Ashbury.

In 1976 Connie organized the first carnival in San Francisco.

Connie was the founder of Carijama Oakland Carnival, a San Francisco Bay Area carnival begun in the 70s. She was also one of the founders of the Carnival West Coast Caribbean Association.

== Quotes ==
In 1979, in an interview, Williams talked about her experience with artists and people she met. “All the people I met…were bohemians…and I guess I was too. That's why I've never had any money.

“To look at me now, you'd think I was born fat but I wasn't. I used to pose for these young artists. Fifty cents an hour. Then I'd take the money and buy food and cook it for them. That would happen two, three times a week.”
