= Fred Nall Hollis =

American artist (1948–2024)

- Born: April 21, 1948; Troy, Alabama, U.S.
- Died: September 14, 2024 (aged 76)
- Other name: Nall
- Education: University of Alabama (BA)

Fred Nall Hollis (April 21, 1948 – September 14, 2024) was an American artist who used the name Nall. He owned a studio and gallery in Fairhope, Alabama.

== Early life and education ==
Nall was born in Troy, Alabama, the son of Mary Winifred Nall Hollis and Joe Frost Hollis. His father, a banker, later moved the family to Arab, Alabama, where Nall finished high school. Nall then attended the University of Alabama, earning a Bachelor of Arts degree in art with minors in psychology and political science.

Nall was admitted to study at the École des Beaux-Arts (School of Fine Arts) of Paris, France in 1971.

== Career ==
Nall traveled widely, particularly in the Middle East, North Africa, India, and Mexico, with his art being influenced by surroundings ranging from Arabic and Byzantine architecture to Alabama quilts. His art was soon recognized and exhibited in the United States as well as Europe. He claimed to have studied under Salvador Dalí (no presented visual record exists yet of such a correspondence) who trained him in artistic techniques and inspired him to devote his life to the pursuit of beauty through artwork.

Nall took care of James Baldwin on his deathbed. Nall became friends with Baldwin in the early 1970s because Baldwin would buy him drinks at the Café de Flore. Nall recalled talking to Baldwin about racism in Alabama with the racially conscious author. In one conversation, Nall told Baldwin that "Through your books you liberated me from my guilt about being so bigoted coming from Alabama and because of my homosexuality." Baldwin insisted that "No, you liberated me in revealing this to me."

Nall was close friends with Albert II, Prince of Monaco and Catherine Deneuve who both own multiple works created by him. He was also a friend of Ringo Starr.

== Death ==
Nall died on September 14, 2024, at the age of 76.

== NALL Art Association ==
In 1986, Nall bought a studio in Vence, France, and began publishing his line engravings. This led to his acquiring the existing Karolyi Foundation and from this creating the NALL (Nature Art & Life League) Art Association. Located on a 3-hectare (7.4-acre) estate in a valley between Vence and Saint-Paul-de-Vence, Nall spent three years personally rebuilding and renovating the entire existing houses and adding a Museum to house and exhibit his artwork. The NALL Art Association offered artistic training for college students and provided a cultural life through exhibitions and conferences. The facilities included ten cabins and studios for artists and a studio-museum. The NALL was lost to his ex-wife, Tuscia Cole, in a divorce and is now closed to the public. She has taken up residence there and has invited her family to live in his museum and in the former 'artists and writers cabins'.

== Books ==
In 2000, Nall organized the Alabama Art Exhibit, highlighting 13 artists with different areas of expertise. Nall produced a portrait of each of the artists, displayed with the individual's art work. The resulting book, Alabama Art, is now permanently housed in the Mobile Museum of Art.

Another book by Nall is entitled The RSA Permanent Collection of Alabama Art, and includes information on more than 150 Alabama artists.

In February 1996, NALL Technique & Symbole, written by Alain Renner, artistic director of Sotheby's Monte-Carlo and Paris, was published by Michel Pastor of Monaco.

Nall Alchemy, written by Hugues de la Touche and published by Musées de Menton in 2006, includes a retrospective of Nall's work through 2004.

Vittorio Sgarbi wrote Violata Pax about the series of Nall's work that was the subject of a multi-national exhibit in St. Francis of Assisi Monastery, Assisi, Italy; Church of St. Augustin, Pietrasanta, Italy; Museum Carnoles, Menton, France; and Mobile Museum of Art, Mobile, Alabama, USA. The book was designed by Alberto Bartalini and published by the NALL Art Association in 2006.

Nall-Mossa/Eros & Agapa by Jean Forneris compares Nall's work to that of artist Gustav-Adolf Mossa. It was published in 1997 by Galerie-Musee Raoul Dufy/Musées de la N.A.L.L. Art Association.

== Art ==
Nall has gained an international reputation for works in many media. The following is a summary from Solo-Mosacio:

- Mosaics – Monumental "Sunrise & Sunset Pensee", measuring 5-m by 5-m each, for the Grimaldi Forum in Monaco.
- Sculpture – Violata Pax project in Assisi & Pietrasanta, Italy; Menton, France; Monaco Cathedral, Monaco; Mobile, Alabama. Monumental "Peace Frame" for the Monastery of St. Francis of Assisi, now in Monaco and the Pisa Airport, and permanently installed in Pietrasanta, Italy; "Violata Pax Colombe" Sculpture in Miami Dade College and in the permanent collection of Prince Albert II of Monaco.
- Line engravings – Nall has produced over 150 copper plate etchings that are in the permanent collection of the Boston Museum of Fine Arts; Museum of Pau, France; and Birmingham, Montgomery, and Huntsville Museums of Art. About 20 other museums contain Nall's works.
- Porcelain – Three different dinnerware designs for Haviland and Parlon of Limoges, France. Coffee mugs and plates for the Puccini Foundation, released by Tunisian Porcelain Company. Gift plates for the Monaco Lions Club, by the Monaco Porcelain Makers. A new line of Limoges Dinnerware Porcelain of Alabama Camellias, produced by the Tunisian Porcelain, includes six of Mobile's Bellingrath Gardens Camellias.
- Sets and costumes – Designs for "The Girl of the Golden West", and "La Rondine" opera productions at the 2005 Festival Fondazione Pucciniano in Torre del Lago-Puccini, Italy..
- Carpets – A collection of carpet-tapestries were hand-woven in silk and wool for Kamyar Moghadam in Monte Carlo, Monaco. Barbara Paci Galleria in Pietrasanta produced three carpets, 4-m by 4-m, in wool.

== Honors and recognition ==
In 1991, Nall was an artist-in-residence at Troy State University. At the university's graduation ceremony on May 13, 2001, Nall was awarded a Doctorate Honoris Causa degree. Nall was also an Artist-in-Residence at the University of Alabama in Tuscaloosa (2000), and Miami Dade College (2006).

Monaco installed two monumental mosaics by Nall, "Pensee Sunrise" and "Pensee Sunset", in L'Opio tiles at their new cultural center, the Grimaldi Forum. In December 2005, this City-State issued a postage stamp illustrated from these mosaics.

On January 24, 2005, the Tuscany Council for Culture unveiled Nall's commissioned work "La Shoa" in memory of those Italians massacred during World War II.

Nall's monumental "Peace Frame" is also permanently installed as a gateway to Pietrasanta in Tuscany, the work site for some of Michelangelo's sculpture.

In 2007, Nall was named Alabama's Distinguished Artist of the Year by the Alabama State Council on the Arts.

Throughout his career, Nall has exhibited at over 300 one-man shows.

Troy University, in Troy, Alabama, dedicated a Nall Hollis Museum on permanent exhibit for Nall's work. Nall has given over $4,000,000 worth of artwork to his home town's Troy University for this museum.
