= No Name in the Street =

1972 non-fiction book by James Baldwin

- First US edition cover
- Author: James Baldwin
- Language: English
- Genre: Essays
- Publisher: Dial Press (US); Michael Joseph (UK)
- Publication date: 1972
- Publication place: United States
- ISBN: 0-385-27328-2

No Name in the Street is the fourth non-fiction book by American writer and poet James Baldwin; it was first published in 1972. Baldwin describes his views on several historical events and figures: McCarthyism, the assassination of Martin Luther King Jr., Malcolm X, Huey Newton, Eldridge Cleaver, and the 1963 March on Washington for Jobs and Freedom. The book also covers the Algerian War and Albert Camus' take on it.

Baldwin recounts the Harlem that shaped his early consciousness and the later murders of his friends Martin Luther King Jr. and Malcolm X, along with his stay in Europe and in Hollywood and his return to the American South to confront a violent America.

== The March on Washington ==
The March on Washington, planned by A. Philip Randolph, founder of the Brotherhood of Sleeping Car Porters, took place in Washington, D.C., on August 28, 1963, and was the largest demonstration in the nation's capital, and one of the first to have extensive television coverage. It promoted civil rights and equality for African Americans, and at it, Martin Luther King Jr. gave his "I Have a Dream" speech.

In 1941, Randolph had planned a march to draw attention to the exclusion of African Americans from positions in the national defense industry. The threat of 100,000 marchers in Washington, DC, pushed President Franklin D. Roosevelt to issue Executive Order 8802, which mandated the formation of the Fair Employment Practice Committee to investigate racial discrimination charges against defense firms. In response, Randolph cancelled plans for the march.

The March on Washington for Jobs and Freedom helped to pass the Civil Rights Act and the Voting Rights Act. The former outlawed major forms of discrimination against racial, ethnic, national, and religious minorities along with women, ending legal racial segregation. The full title of the act was to enforce the constitutional right to vote, to confer jurisdiction upon the district courts of the US to provide injunctive relief against discrimination in public accommodations, to authorize the Attorney General to institute suits to protect constitutional rights in public facilities and public education, to extend the Commission on Civil Rights, to prevent discrimination in federally assisted programs, to establish a Commission on Equal Employment Opportunity, and for other purposes. The full title of the Voting Rights Act of 1965 was to enforce the Fifteenth Amendment to the US Constitution, and for other purposes.

== Martin Luther King Jr. and Malcolm X ==
In the book, Baldwin discusses his whereabouts during the murders of two of the movement's most influential titanic figures—Malcolm X and Martin Luther King Jr. He discusses his involvement, philosophies the meaning of the movement, its key players, what impact as a whole it had on all Americans and, ultimately, how it changed his attitude about the possibility of America ever achieving racial harmony.

=== Martin Luther King Jr. ===
Martin Luther King Jr. was a Baptist minister and a civil rights activist best known by his role in the advancement of civil rights. He was known as a peaceful man, inspired by Gandhi's success with non-violent activism, and did not believe in using violence to get his point across. In 1959, King visited Gandhi's birthplace, the trip deepening his understanding of nonviolent resistance and his commitment to America's struggle for civil rights. In an address that was played on the radio, King reflected on his experience and how it changed him: "Since being in India, I am more convinced than ever before that the method of nonviolent resistance is the most potent weapon available to oppressed people in their struggle for justice and human dignity. In a real sense, Mahatma Gandhi embodied in his life certain universal principles that are inherent in the moral structure of the universe, and these principles are as inescapable as the law of gravitation."

King was assassinated in room 306 of the Lorraine Motel in Memphis, Tennessee, on April 4, 1968. After emergency chest surgery, he was pronounced dead. The motel is now the home of the National Civil Rights Museum.

King and James Baldwin were close friends. They met in 1958 just a year after the Montgomery bus boycott. Along with King, Baldwin helped shape the idealism upon which the sixties civil rights protest was based. Baldwin frequently mentions King throughout his book "Since Martin's death... Something has gone away. Perhaps even more than the death itself, the manner of his death has forced me into a judgment concerning human life and human beings which I have always been reluctant to make."

=== Malcolm X ===
Malcolm X was an African-American Muslim minister and civil rights activist. In 1946, at the age of twenty, he went to prison for breaking and entering. While there, he became a member of the Nation of Islam. In February 1965, he was preparing to address the Organization of Afro-American Unity. As a fight broke out in the audience, he and his bodyguards went to defuse the situation, and a man seated in the front row of the audience shot him in the chest. Two more men ran onto the stage and shot Malcolm X several times. Malcolm X had 21 gunshot wounds to his chest, left shoulder, arms and legs.
