= Remember This House =

Unfinished manuscript by James Baldwin

- Author: James Baldwin
- Language: English
- Genre: Memoir, non-fiction
- Publication date: Unreleased
- Publication place: United States

Remember This House is an unfinished manuscript by James Baldwin, a memoir of his personal recollections of civil rights leaders Medgar Evers, Malcolm X and Martin Luther King Jr.

Following Baldwin's 1987 death, publishing company McGraw-Hill sued his estate to recover the $200,000 advance they had paid him for the book. The lawsuit was dropped in 1990.

The manuscript forms the basis for Raoul Peck's 2016 documentary film I Am Not Your Negro. In February 2017, Vintage International published the book I Am Not Your Negro to accompany the documentary.
