= Anna Malaika Tubbs =

American sociologist and author

- Occupations: Sociologist, author
- Spouse: Michael Tubbs

Academic background
- Education: Stanford University; University of Cambridge

Academic work
- Notable works: The Three Mothers: How the Mothers of Martin Luther King Jr, Malcolm X, and James Baldwin Shaped a Nation; Erased: What American Patriarchy Has Hidden From Us

Anna Malaika Tubbs is an American sociologist and author. Her first book, The Three Mothers: How the Mothers of Martin Luther King Jr., Malcolm X, and James Baldwin Shaped a Nation, was published in 2021. Her second book, Erased: What American Patriarchy Has Hidden From Us , was published in 2025. Both books were New York Times bestsellers. Tubbs has a bachelor's degree in anthropology from Stanford University. She holds a master's degree in multidisciplinary gender studies and a doctorate in sociology, both from the University of Cambridge.
