= The Evidence of Things Not Seen =

1985 book-length essay by James Baldwin

- First edition cover
- Author: James Baldwin
- Language: English
- Subject: Atlanta murders of 1979–1981
- Genre: Essay
- Publisher: Holt, Rinehart and Winston
- Publication date: 1985
- Publication place: United States
- Media type: Print (hardcover and paperback)
- Pages: 125
- ISBN: 0030055296

The Evidence of Things Not Seen is a book-length essay by James Baldwin, published in 1985 by Holt, Rinehart and Winston. The book covers the Atlanta murders of 1979–1981, often called the Atlanta child murders, and examines race relations and other social and cultural issues in Atlanta. Baldwin had ventured to Atlanta as a literary reporter on assignment for Playboy magazine, which had previously published many prominent black writers, such as Alex Haley and James Farmer. Walter Lowe, the magazine's first black editor, had proposed this assignment to Baldwin. The book's title draws from Hebrews 11:1.

== Background ==
Baldwin's past writing had established him a prominent social critic and public intellectual. While researching the Atlanta child murders, he encountered Camille Bell, the mother of a 9-year-old, named Yusef, killed in this period. Camille Bell created a Committee to Stop Children's Murders, which advocated for the affected families. According to Derrick Bell, who wrote the foreword in the book's 1995 edition, the earlier outcry had revealed the need for Baldwin to write an essay that "eschews a search for clues and, instead, undertakes an exploration for truths."^{[3]}

== Themes ==
=== The Committee to Stop Children's Murders ===
Camille Bell was a young mother to a 9-year old boy named Yusuf Bell. Yusuf's body was found in a crawlspace in an abandoned elementary school that had been empty for over five years. When Bell contacted police about the investigation of her son's death, she was ignored. Bell and a number of mothers formed a "support group" that soon became the Committee to Stop Children's Murders. This committee sought to determine the culprit behind the Atlanta Child Murders. By the time the committee was formed in May 1980, eight children had been murdered and their killer remained at large.

Baldwin praised Bell for her extensive knowledge of the murders, but said that, out of respect, he did not interview Bell. The Committee to Stop Children's Murders began collecting funds to help the parents of the murdered children continue their efforts. However, the state of Georgia charged them for having "violated Georgia law as concerned charitable solicitations."

=== Trial of Wayne Williams ===
On June 21, 1981, Wayne Williams was arrested for the murders of Nathaniel Cater and Jimmy Payne. The trial began on January 6, 1982, and was overseen by judge Clarence Cooper. Baldwin discusses Williams's upbringing, stresses that Williams was not accused of all 28 murders, and eventually concludes that Williams "must be added to the list of Atlanta's slaughtered black children."

After a two-month investigative period, Williams was tried and convicted for the murder of two of the murder victims, although both of them were adults. He was subsequently sentenced to life imprisonment. However, over the years there has been significant debate over the culpability of Williams and the common assumption that he was the sole perpetrator of the murders. Many observers have put forth alternative theories concerning the murders based on circumstantial evidence, including involvement by the Ku Klux Klan, convicted pedophiles, the Centers for Disease Control and Prevention, and the CIA. In 2019, Atlanta Mayor Keisha Lance Bottoms and Atlanta police chief Erika Shields that it would retest evidence associated with the murders, citing advancements in DNA technology.

=== Race relations in Atlanta ===
The investigation into the Atlanta child murders was overseen by police commissioner Lee P. Brown. Fear was heightened around the city and people grew anxious and concerned as time passed. Lee held several city meetings during this period, hoping to calm public fear and reinstate public trust in the police to find the murderer. Lee brought together a task force of more than 100 personnel from Atlanta's own police force and nearby law-enforcement agencies.

During Brown's tenure as Atlanta's police commissioner, efforts rose to diversify Atlanta's police force, which at the time was only 20% African-American. The same Atlanta police force in the late 1940s hired its first African-American police officers; however, it stripped them of enforcing all laws; for instance, black officers were not allowed to arrest white people.

Baldwin examines the relationship between the African American community and the police, but specifically, the relationship between said community and African American police officers. Some of Atlanta's black officers were Baldwin's guides while reporting in the city, which allowed Baldwin to observe the officers' reactions to the community's view of the black police force. Baldwin compares the relationship between the police and the black community in Atlanta to that to Harlem, where he grew up. He notes that in Harlem, black police officers understood and accepted the fact that the community distrusted them, while among Atlanta's black officers, who received the same sentiment from their own community, "the knowledge seemed to sting."

Baldwin notes that judge Cooper was born in Decatur, a predominantly white Atlanta suburb, and discusses the popular expression "I'm from Atlanta. I'm not from Georgia." The author makes a parallel with a similar expression about Harlem: "I'm from Harlem. I'm not from New York." Baldwin also references his own interactions with friends in Atlanta who assume the identity of being an Atlantan without identifying as a Georgian.

Baldwin also discusses Atlanta's origins as a railroad town named Terminus. In the 1980s, Atlanta's Hartsfield–Jackson Airport emerged as one of the world's busiest airports. Baldwin remarks on the success of Atlanta as a commercial hub to highlight the city's self-image as "The City Too Busy To Hate."

== Critical reception ==
In a review for The New York Times, John Flemming highlighted Baldwin's impression of being like a stranger in Atlanta during his investigation and research.

In Richard Schur's review of Baldwin's work, he ties the essay's publication date in the 1980s to a broader criticism by intellectuals and activists of the National Association for the Advancement of Colored People (NAACP)'s strategy to advance justice for African Americans. Schur supports Baldwin's claims that eradicating racist legal doctrines was insufficient to rehabilitate the lives of African Americans.

== See also ==
- Leaving Atlanta, a novel by Tayari Jones about the Atlanta child murders.
