= Armengol =

Armengol is a surname.

== People ==
Notable people with the surname include:

- Francina Armengol (born 1971), Spanish politician
- Joan Armengol (1922/1923–2020), Andorran attorney and politician
- Josep M. Armengol (born 1977), Spanish literary scholar and researcher in the field of gender and masculinity studies
- Jorge Lozano Armengol (born 1948), Mexican politician
- Lali Armengol (born 1945), Spanish playwright, professor and theater director
- Luis Antonio Martínez Armengol (born 1952), Mexican politician
- Margarita Armengol (born 1960), Spanish swimmer
- Maria Antonia Armengol (born 1950), Spanish politician
- Maria Teresa Armengol, Andorran politician
- Mario Ruiz Armengol (1914–2002), Mexican pianist, composer, arranger, conductor and music teacher
- Pedro Armengol (c. 1238 – 1304), Spanish Roman Catholic saint
- Vicente Mut Armengol (1614–1687), Mallorcan astronomer, engineer, historian, mathematician and soldier
