= Giovanni's Room =

1956 novel by James Baldwin

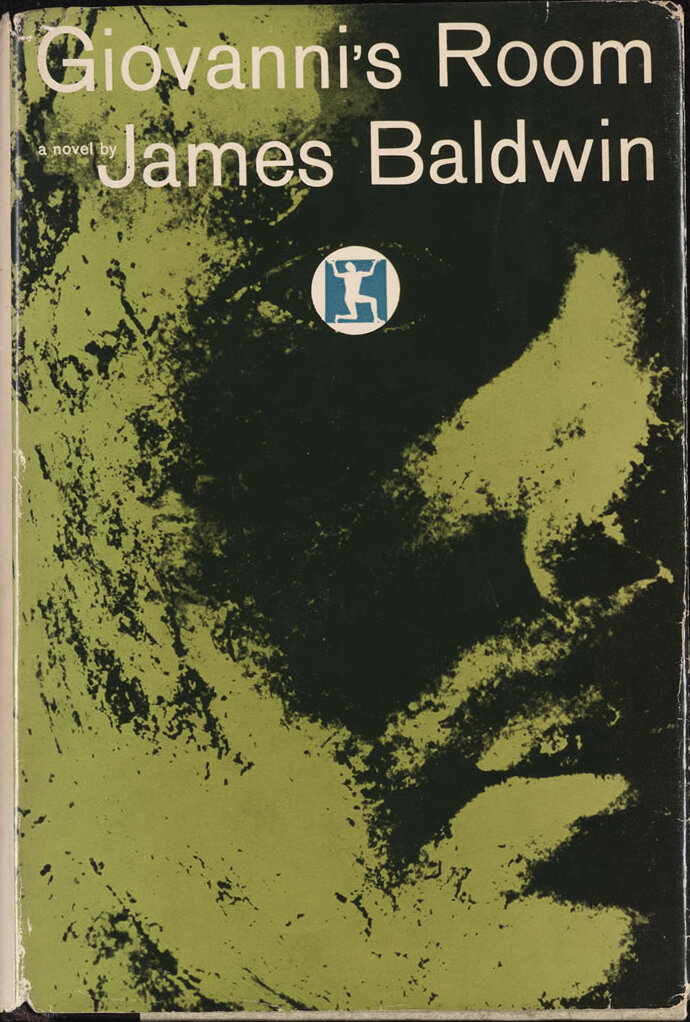
- First edition
- Author: James Baldwin
- Language: English
- Genre: Gay novel
- Publisher: Dial Press, N.Y.
- Publication date: 1956
- Publication place: United States
- Media type: Print (hardcover & paperback)
- Pages: 159
- OCLC: 44800071

Giovanni's Room is a 1956 novel by James Baldwin. The book concerns the events in the life of an American man living in Paris and his feelings and frustrations with his relationships with other men, particularly an Italian bartender named Giovanni whom he meets at a Parisian gay bar. While he deals with his difficulties with men, he is engaged to an American woman who is travelling in Spain.

Baldwin's novel was considered controversial upon its release in 1956 and has since prompted discussions of many issues, including representations of homosexuality, bisexuality, and struggles with internalized homophobia. The novel also raises questions of social alienation, identity, masculinity, and manhood.

== Plot ==
David, a young American man whose girlfriend has gone off to Spain to contemplate marriage, is left alone in Paris and begins an affair with an Italian man, Giovanni. The entire story is narrated by David during "the night which is leading me to the most terrible morning of my life," when Giovanni will be executed for committing murder. Baldwin tackles social isolation, gender and sexual identity crisis, as well as conflicts of masculinity within this story of a young man navigating the public sphere in a society that rejects a core aspect of his sexuality.

=== Part one ===
David, in Southern France, is about to board a train back to Paris. His girlfriend Hella, to whom he had proposed before she went to Spain, has returned to the United States. As for Giovanni, he is about to be guillotined.

David remembers his first experience with a boy, Joey, who lived in Brooklyn. The two bonded and eventually had a sexual encounter during a sleepover. The two boys began kissing and having sex. The next day, David left, and a little later he took to bullying Joey in order to feel like a real man.

David now lives with his father, who is prone to drinking, and his aunt, Ellen. The latter upbraids the father for not being a good example to his son. David's father says that all he wants is for David to become a real man. Later, David begins drinking, too, and drinks and drives once, ending up in an accident. Back home, the two men talk, and David convinces his father to let him skip college and get a job instead. He then decides to move to France to find himself.

After a year in Paris, penniless, he calls Jacques, an older gay male acquaintance, to meet him for supper so he can ask for money. (In a prolepsis, Jacques and David meet again and discuss Giovanni's fall.) The two men go to Guillaume's gay bar. They meet Giovanni, the new bartender, at whom Jacques tries to make a pass until he gets talking with Guillaume. Meanwhile, David and Giovanni become friends. Later, they all go to a restaurant in Les Halles for breakfast. Jacques enjoins David not to be ashamed to feel love; they eat oysters and drink white wine. Giovanni recounts how he met Guillaume in a cinema; how the two men had dinner together because Giovanni wanted a free meal. He also explains that Guillaume is prone to making trouble. Later, the two men go back to Giovanni's room and they have sex.

Flashing forward again to the day of Giovanni's execution, David is in his house in the South of France. The caretaker comes round for the inventory, as he is moving out the next day. She encourages him to get married, have children, and pray.

=== Part two ===
David moves into Giovanni's small room. They broach the subject of Hella, about whom Giovanni is not worried, but who reveals the Italian's misogynistic prejudices about women and the need for men to dominate them. David then briefly describes Giovanni's room, which is always in the dark because, even though there are no curtains, Giovanni has painted over the windows with a white cleaning polish in order to create privacy. David goes on to read a letter from his father, asking him to go back to America, but he does not want to do that. The young man walks into a sailor; David believes the sailor is a gay man (who can tell that David desires him), though it is unclear whether this is true or if the sailor is just staring back at David.

A subsequent letter from Hella announces that she is returning in a few days, and David realizes he has to part with Giovanni soon. Setting off to prove to himself that he is not gay, David searches for a woman with whom he can have sex. He meets a slight acquaintance, Sue, in a bar and they go back to her place and have sex; he does not want to see her again and has only slept with her to feel better about himself. When he returns to the room, David finds a hysterical Giovanni, who has been fired from Guillaume's bar and falsely accused of stealing from the till.

Hella returns, and David leaves Giovanni's room without telling him for three days. He writes to his father asking for money for his marriage. The couple then runs into Jacques and Giovanni in a bookshop, which makes Hella uncomfortable because she does not like Jacques's mannerisms. After walking Hella back to her hotel room, David goes to Giovanni's room to talk; the Italian man is distressed. David thinks that they cannot have a life together and feels that he would be sacrificing his manhood if he stays with Giovanni. He leaves but runs into Giovanni several times and is upset by the "fairy" mannerisms that he is developing and his new relationship with Jacques, who is an older and richer man. Sometime later, David finds out that Giovanni is no longer with Jacques and that he might be able to get a job at Guillaume's bar again.

News suddenly comes out that Guillaume has been murdered, and it creates a scandal, as Guillaume was "one of the oldest names in France". David imagines that Giovanni went back into the bar to ask for a job, and that Guillaume "wants Giovanni to undress.... Giovanni realizes that he cannot go through with it." But he "is overcome, and Guillaume has his will. I think [says David] if this had not happened, Giovanni would not have killed him". He imagines that Guillaume then makes excuses for why he cannot rehire him as a bartender; in reality, they both know that Giovanni is no longer of interest to Guillaume's bar's clientele since so much of his life has been played out in public. Giovanni responds by killing Guillaume in rage. Giovanni attempts to hide, but he is discovered by the police and sentenced to death for murder. Hella and David then move to the South of France, where they discuss gender roles, and Hella expresses her desire to live under a man as a woman. David, wracked with guilt over Giovanni's impending execution, leaves her and goes to Nice for a few days, where he spends his time with a sailor. Hella finds him and discovers his bisexuality, which she says she suspected all along. She bitterly decides to go back to America. The book ends with David's mental pictures of Giovanni's execution and his own guilt.

== Characters ==
- David, the protagonist and the novel's narrator. A blond American man, David spends a lot of the novel battling with his sexuality and his internalized homophobia. His mother died when he was five years old.
- Hella, David's girlfriend. They met in a bar in Saint-Germain-des-Prés. She is from Minneapolis and moved to Paris to study painting, until she threw in the towel and met David by serendipity. Throughout the novel David intends to marry her.
- Giovanni, a young Italian man who left his village after his girlfriend gave birth to a dead child. He works as a bartender in Guillaume's gay bar. Giovanni is the titular character whose romantic relationship with David leads them to spend a large amount of the story in his apartment. Giovanni's room itself is very dirty, with countless boxes, peeled wallpaper, a rotten potato, and wine spilled across the place.
- Jacques, an old American businessman, born in Belgium. He spends money on younger men, one of whom is David.
- Guillaume, the owner of a gay bar in Paris, who also pays for the company of younger men.
- The Flaming Princess, an older man who tells David inside the gay bar that Giovanni is very dangerous.
- Madame Clothilde, the owner of the restaurant in Les Halles.
- Pierre, a young man at the restaurant, implied to be a rent boy.
- Yves, a tall, pockmarked young man playing the pinball machine in the restaurant.
- The Caretaker in the South of France. She was born in Italy and moved to France as a child. Her husband's name is Mario; they lost all their money in the Second World War, and two of their three sons died. Their living son has a son, also named Mario.
- Sue, a blonde girl from Philadelphia who comes from a rich family and with whom David has a brief and regretful sexual encounter.
- David's father. His relationship with David is masked by artificial heartiness; he cannot bear to acknowledge that they are not close and he might have failed in raising his son. He married for the second time after David was grown but before the action in the novel takes place. Throughout the novel David's father sends David money to sustain himself in Paris and begs David to return to America.
- Ellen, David's paternal aunt. She would read books and knit; at parties she would dress skimpily, with too much make-up on. She worried that David's father was an inappropriate influence on David's development.
- Joey, a neighbor in Coney Island, Brooklyn. David's first same-sex experience was with him.
- Beatrice, a woman David's father sees.
- The Fairy, whom David had a relationship with in the army, and who was later discharged for being gay.

== Inspiration ==
An argument can be made that David resembles Baldwin in Paris as he left America after growing up under its racism. David, though not a victim of racism like Baldwin himself, is an American who escapes to Paris. However, when asked if the book was autobiographical in an interview in 1980, Baldwin explains he was influenced by his observations in Paris, but the novel was not necessarily shaped by his own experiences:

No, it is more of a study of how it might have been or how I feel it might have been. I mean, for example, some of the people I have met. We all met in a bar, there was a blond French guy sitting at a table, he bought us drinks. And, two or three days later, I saw his face in the headlines of a Paris paper. He had been arrested and was later guillotined. That stuck in my mind.

== Literary significance and criticism ==
Even though Baldwin stated that "the sexual question and the racial question have always been entwined", in Giovanni's Room, all of the characters are white. This was a surprise for his readers, since Baldwin was primarily known for his novel Go Tell It on the Mountain, which puts emphasis on the African-American experience. Highlighting the impossibility of tackling two major issues at once in America, Baldwin stated:

I certainly could not possibly have—not at that point in my life—handled the other great weight, the 'Negro problem.' The sexual-moral light was a hard thing to deal with. I could not handle both propositions in the same book. There was no room for it.

Nathan A. Scott Jr., for example, stated that Go Tell It on the Mountain showed Baldwin's "passionate identification" with his people whereas Giovanni's Room could be considered "as a deflection, as a kind of detour." Baldwin's identity as a gay and black man was questioned by both black and white people. His masculinity was called into question, due to his apparent homosexual desire for white men – this caused him to be labelled as similar to a white woman. He was considered to be "not black enough" by many of his peers and colleagues, and labeled subversive by the Civil rights movement leaders.

Baldwin's American publisher, Knopf, suggested that he "burn" the book because the theme of homosexuality would alienate him from his readership among black people. He was told, "You cannot afford to alienate that audience. This new book will ruin your career, because you're not writing about the same things and in the same manner as you were before, and we won't publish this book as a favor to you." However, upon publication critics tended not to be so harsh thanks to Baldwin's standing as a writer. Giovanni's Room was ranked number 2 on a list of the 100 best gay and lesbian novels compiled by The Publishing Triangle in 1999.

On November 5, 2019, the BBC News listed Giovanni's Room on its list of the 100 most influential novels.

The 2020 novel Swimming in the Dark by Polish writer Tomasz Jedrowski presents a fictionalized depiction of LGBTQ life in the Polish People's Republic. Citing Giovanni's Room as a major influence in his writing, Jedrowski pays homage to Baldwin by incorporating the novel into his narrative, the two main characters beginning an affair after one lends a copy of Giovanni's Room to the other.

Most criticism of the novel has focused on the role of heterosexuality.

Santiago Herrera attempts to provide more insight into why Giovanni's Room was so heavily criticised: "Early critics of Giovanni's Room were split in two: they either did not like it because the main characters, David and Giovanni, were explicitly shown in a same-sex relationship, or because David was white. 63 years after the novel's publication, this still makes me wonder: why was there so much initial opposition? Why was there so much controversy over David just being an average American man? The answer, Baldwin was black." As Herrera states, much of the criticism was due to Baldwin's race, even though the novel was deliberately written to focus on sexuality alone. While Baldwin was attempting to write a more or less "raceless" novel, this could not be achieved due to the societal yearning for racial discourse.

== Major themes ==
=== Social alienation ===
One theme of Giovanni's Room is social alienation. Susan Stryker notes that prior to writing Giovanni's Room, James Baldwin had recently emigrated to Europe and "felt that the effects of racism in the United States would never allow him to be seen simply as a writer, and he feared that being tagged as gay would mean he couldn't be a writer at all." In Giovanni's Room, David is faced with the same type of decision; on the surface he faces a choice between his American fiancée (and value set) and his European boyfriend, but ultimately, like Baldwin, he must grapple with "being alienated by the culture that produced him." Baldwin also develops this theme through other characters who appear in his novel, such as Giovanni. Both by David and by his background as an Italian immigrant, Giovanni is found to be isolated throughout the book. Giovanni is pinned as 'alien' by David, in which he becomes a figure of mystery, though the reader does learn a lot about Giovanni in relation to David, there is not much revealed about Giovanni himself, apart from small revelations about his social status and class, which work to separate him from the other characters in the novel, such as Jacques, Guillaume and David. Thus, Giovanni faces issues of social alienation by both the information given to the reader and the information that is withheld from the reader – which may have been how Baldwin felt with his social presence in America.

Furthermore, when Hella comes back from Spain, she acts as both a narrative reminder of the pressures of a heteronormative society on David, and those pressures unto herself as an independent and strong-willed woman, particularly as David's friends and associates all think of her as strange and not womanly for travelling on her own. Hella is unable to imagine herself as both a woman and independent, that her identity can only be validated by her attachment to a man, so she pushes for them to marry and settle down. This is communicated through David's unreliable narration. Even so, Hella's struggles are another clear element of how widespread social alienation is within Giovanni's Room, largely due to the effects of heteronormativity. Each character in the novel suffers in feeling alone and alienated by this strict society, so they grasp onto norms and hide beneath them, failing to gain true connections, worsening their misery.

=== Identity ===
In keeping with the theme of social alienation, this novel also explores the topics of origin and identity. As Valerie Rohy of the University of Vermont argues: "Questions of origin and identity are central to James Baldwin's Giovanni's Room, a text which not only participates in the tradition of the American expatriate novel exemplified by Stein and, especially, by Henry James but which does so in relation to the African-American idiom of passing and the genre of the passing novel. As such, Giovanni's Room poses questions of nationalism, nostalgia, and the constitution of racial and sexual subjects in terms that are especially resonant for contemporary identity politics.

=== Sexuality and race ===
Scholar Josep Armengol wrote that at the time of its publication, the book was viewed as being "raceless", but that actually "in Giovanni's Room, race is deflected onto sexuality with the result that whiteness is transvalued [sic] as heterosexuality, just as homosexuality becomes associated with blackness, both literally and metaphorically." Baldwin "transvalues" these traditionally "binary opposites" by establishing "color-full associations" between whiteness and heterosexuality, on the one hand, and blackness and homosexuality on the other.

=== Masculinity ===
David grapples with insecurities pertaining to his masculinity throughout the novel. He spends much of his time comparing himself to every man he meets, ensuring that his performative masculinity allows him to "pass" while negotiating the public sphere. For David, masculinity is intertwined with sexual identity, and thus he believes that his same-sex desires act against his masculinity. One of David's prominent male figures is his alcoholic father, with whom he holds a complex and sensitive relationship. After a drunk driving incident, David is met by his father in the hospital, where his father repeatedly reassures David that he "is going to be all right", to which David replies "Daddy" and begins to cry. This moment of expected vulnerability from David and his father cements the pain behind their relationship, which can be seen to cause David to put up a front of masculinity, which—to him—does not coincide with his sexual attractions.

=== Manhood ===
The phrase "manhood" repeats throughout the book, in much the same ways that masculinity manifests itself. The difference between the two themes, in this case, is that David's manhood seems to be more to do with his sexual relationships, whereas his masculinity is guided by learned public behaviours he claims to inherit from his father. The self-loathing and projecting that ensues seem to depict the final blow to a man who already had a great amount of dysphoria. Baldwin's positioning of manhood within the narrative aligns it also with nationhood, sexuality and all facets of performance within the public sphere. Josep Armengol linked Baldwin's description of manhood as a way of him navigating his experiences of blackness in the LGBTQ+ community, particularly when David describes his earliest same-sex encounter with a boy called Joey. In this description "black" becomes a motif for experience and his dark thoughts surrounding Joey and his body.

=== LGBTQ+ spaces and movement in the public sphere ===
Much of the integral plot of Giovanni's Room occurs within queer spaces, with the gay bar David frequents being the catalyst that not only drives the plot, but allows it to occur. The bar acts as a mediator for David; Baldwin uses this setting to bring up much of the conflict of the novel; however, it remains a place that David returns to. Meanwhile, Giovanni's room acts as a private space where Giovanni and David can return to in order to avoid public scrutiny. It is the place where they can actively live out their queerness. David rejects the room as much as he rejects his queerness, linking the privacy and life of queer people together. The novel negotiates the behavior of publicly LGBTQ+ people alongside those who are still "closeted", like David, and how these differing perspectives have an effect on the individual as well as the community that they navigate. Even within the public queer spaces like the bar, they act differently than in the safety of Giovanni's room. Away from the scrutiny of other people, David is more ready to display his affections. These differences of how David acts in different spaces shows the intersectionality of class and sexuality that is explored in the novel. Not everyone is able to afford private spaces based on their class status. With that, not everyone has spaces to be queer in, as the public sphere does not allow it. This can be seen at the end of the novel, when all falls apart because Giovanni needs money and is forced into the public sphere. The private sphere is a protection from the public sphere and its loss has dire consequences. The less money one is able to make, the more likely this is to happen while high-class people do not experience similar fears of loss.

=== Question of bisexuality ===
Ian Young argues that the novel portrays homosexual and bisexual life in western society as uncomfortable and uncertain, respectively. Young also points out that despite the novel's "tenderness and positive qualities" it still ends with a murder.

Recent scholarship has focused on the more precise designation of bisexuality within the novel. Several scholars have claimed that the characters can be more accurately seen as bisexual, namely David and Giovanni. As Maiken Solli claims, though most people read the characters as gay/homosexual, "a bisexual perspective could be just as valuable and enlightening in understanding the book, as well as exposing the bisexual experience."

Though the novel is considered a homosexual and bisexual novel, Baldwin has on occasion stated that it was "not so much about homosexuality, it is what happens if you are so afraid that you finally cannot love anybody". The novel's protagonist, David, seems incapable of deciding between Hella and Giovanni and expresses both hatred and love for the two, though he often questions if his feelings are authentic or superficial.

=== Internalised homophobia ===
Leading on from David's issues with his masculinity, another key dilemma became prevalent – David's struggle with internalised homophobia. As Alaina Masanto states, David "has internalized the social hatred directed towards him". This problem presses onto David's psyche and becomes alarmingly apparent in his first encounter with Giovanni. As they meet in a Parisian gay bar, David appears reluctant to speak to Giovanni, though once their conversation begins, he falls in love. He continuously denies these feelings, until he cannot, and he ends up repeatedly staying in Giovanni's room, which David describes as dark and dingy, a room of shame and sin.

Santiago Herrera describes this darkness that David sees in the room, stating: "Just as the tightening noose of heteronormative oppression gets ever closer to David through Hella, so too does the painting remind him of his indecision. Giovanni's room is dark, with only one window with soaped-up panes instead of curtains for privacy and trash all over. When the boys go out, it's in the early mornings or at night, before or after Giovanni's shifts as a bartender. Their lives are always shrouded in a darkness of some kind, and it only worsens when Hella comes to Paris."

David's push–pull relationship with Giovanni and his murky relationship with Hella showcase his torn mental state; he finds himself falling into this "dark side" yet he cannot pull himself out of it as a result of his internalised homophobia.

=== Question of categories ===
Matt Brim explores Giovanni's Room not just as a homosexual or gay text, but one about the failure of love due to the confining and limiting nature of gender and sexuality when understood as static categories. He quotes Baldwin on the initial publication, "Giovanni's Room is not really about homosexuality .... It's about what happens to you if you're afraid to love anybody." The tragedy comes from repressing love when seeing it as dirty and incorrect. Presenting gender and sexuality categories as inhuman and limiting have always been part of Baldwin's work, highlighted in his early essay, "Everybody's Protest Novel", as quoted by Brim, "[T]he failure of the protest novel," Baldwin writes, "lies in its rejection of life, the human being, the denial of his beauty, dread, power, in its insistence that it is his categorization alone which is real and which cannot be transcended."

David is trapped by the explicit labels of 'man' and 'American', as well as the implicit labels, 'homosexual', 'gay', or 'bisexual'. As an American, middle-class, white man, he must marry a girl of his class and have babies for his parents to dote on, whilst he represses a strong love for Giovanni and is attracted to other men, such as Joey and the blond sailor. David is fearful of the associations from being with Giovanni or other men, and prescribes himself a heteronormative life, causing pain for himself and everyone in his life.

=== Failure of queer imagination ===
One aspect of the novel is the presentation of inevitability, not dissimilar from Greek tragedy. On the first page, we learn that Giovanni will die and David is alone. The novel is narrated in the present with David remediating his memories, meaning every character is presented by him. Readers should always be critical of David for this and his unreliability. In his self-reflections, David often comments on the inevitability of his breakup with Giovanni and the failure of his relationship with Hella, and that his partners knew they were doomed. It is unknown if David thought this at the time or is a product of hindsight, and shifting the blame from himself to both partners to share it.

Matt Brim codes this inevitable tragedy as the failure of queer imagination, defining it as allowing oneself to firstly accept themselves and conceptualise themself as queer, then imagine and create their place within society, whether in a heteronormative society or outside of it.

David acknowledges that while he loves Hella, he was always with her more out of necessity than genuine love and desire for marriage and family. With Giovanni, he loves him deeply, but David can't accept that love or be with him because he cannot imagine what their life could be within heteronormative society. This is exemplified in part of Giovanni and David's final argument:

'At least you are starting to be honest. And do you know why you want to get away from me?'

Inside me something locked. 'I cannot have a life with you,' I said.

[...]

'But I'm a man,' I cried, 'A man! What do you think can happen between us?'

'You know very well,' Giovanni said slowly, 'what can happen between us. It is for that reason you are leaving me.'

Giovanni in this scene, and somewhat beforehand, is desperately lonely and mentally unwell whilst desperately and destructively in love with David. In their final real conversation, Giovanni thoroughly summarises David's issues with himself and their relationship: "You are the one who keeps talking about what I want. But I have only been talking about who I want." David is so concerned with his social status and what people think of him, with his inability to imagine a queer future where he could be happy, that he projects his desires onto Giovanni. Perhaps his memory has simplified Giovanni's problems into David's subconscious commenting on his inability to let himself love Giovanni, or perhaps Giovanni is so alone and in need of support that he sees David as an anchor. It is also personal, the 'who' over the 'what'. David can only imagine an unhappy future where he performs the role he believes was laid out for him and distances his love from his social desire. This exchange encapsulates David's self-hatred and inability to imagine his future queerly.

== Adaptations ==
In the late 1970s, filmmaker Michael Raeburn began working with James Baldwin on a movie adaptation of Giovanni's Room, with Baldwin writing the screenplay, and an all-star cast possibly including Robert De Niro and Marlon Brando; however, the project stalled and was eventually abandoned in the wake of financial demands made by Baldwin's agent.

A BBC Radio 3 dramatization of Giovanni's Room by Neil Bartlett was broadcast in 2010.

In 2024, BBC Radio 4 broadcast a five-part reading of the novel by Kyle Soller.

In 2025, Phoenix Dance Theatre toured the UK with a modern dance adaptation, entitled Inside Giovanni's Room.

Also in 2025, Quintessence Theatre Group in Philadelphia, Pennsylvania, produced the first stage adaptation of Giovanni's Room approved by James Baldwin's estate. Co-adapted by Benjamin Sprunger and Paul Oakley Stovall, Phylicia Rashad served as a creative consultant, with Billy Porter as a production sponsor. The production ran for 36 performances with the New York Times hailing "[Baldwin's] works have been slow to come to stage and screen. But a new production of the novel 'Giovanni's Room' shows how rewarding it can be when done right."

The International Theatre Amsterdam ensemble performed a Dutch stage adaptation of the novel from 15 February until 1 March 2026. It starred Eefje Paddenburg (as Hella, Sue and Madame Clothilde), Eelco Smits (as David), Jesse Mensah (as Giovanni), Gijs Scholten van Aschat (as Guillaume) and Louis van Beek (as Jacques). Other characters were cut. The production was directed by Eline Arbo.

== Namesake ==
Philly AIDS Thrift at Giovanni's Room, also known as PAT @ Giovanni's Room and formerly known as Giovanni's Room Bookstore, is a gay bookstore in Philadelphia named after Giovanni's Room. It has been called the "center of gay Philly".

== Censorship ==
In April 2025, the Lukashenko regime added the book to the List of printed publications containing information messages and materials, the distribution of which could harm the national interests of Belarus.

== See also ==
- James Baldwin in France
