= American Academy of Religion =

Learned society for scholars in religious studies

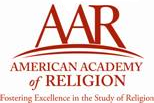
- Formation: 1909; 117 years ago
- Type: Professional association
- Tax ID no.: 20-5478525
- Legal status: 501(c)(3)
- Purpose: The American Academy of Religion's mission is to foster excellence in the academic study of religion and enhance the public understanding of religion.
- Headquarters: 825 Houston Mill Road NE, Atlanta, Georgia, United States
- Region served: United States
- Executive Director: Claudia Schippert
- President: Leela Prasad
- President-Elect: Laurel Schneider
- Website: www.aarweb.org

The American Academy of Religion (AAR) is the world's largest association of scholars in the field of religious studies and related topics. It is a nonprofit member association, serving as a professional and learned society for scholars involved in the academic study of religion. It has some 10,000 members worldwide, with the largest concentration being in the United States and Canada. AAR members are university and college professors, independent scholars, secondary teachers, clergy, seminarians, students, and interested lay-people.

== History ==
AAR was founded in 1909 as the Association of Biblical Instructors in American Colleges and Secondary Schools. The name was changed to National Association of Biblical Instructors (NABI) in 1933. The American Academy of Religion was adopted as the organization name in 1963 to reflect its broader, inclusive mission to foster the academic study of all religions. Over its long history, AAR has broadened its scope to reflect contemporary values of its membership, such as responding to feminist scholarship and women in religion, increased attention to religions beyond Christianity, differentiation between theology and/or religious reflection within the academic study of religion as a cultural/historical/political phenomenon, and engagement with the public understanding of religion. Stausberg suggested that "Probably because of its more encompassing and open policy and its strategy to position itself as the default home for Religious Studies in the United States, the AAR has been a success story." Presidents of the AAR have included well-known scholars such as Judith Plaskow, Mark Juergensmeyer, Wendy Doniger, Emilie Townes, Peter J. Paris, Rebecca Chopp, Elizabeth A. Clark and Ann Taves.

== Publications ==
Oxford University Press publishes Journal of the American Academy of Religion on behalf of the AAR. Religious Studies News is the quarterly newspaper of record for the organization; it transitioned from a print to online-only publication in 2010. AAR also publishes Reading Religion, an online publication featuring book reviews by scholars in religious studies and other related fields. AAR publishes five book series through Oxford University Press: Academy; Reflection and Theory in the Study of Religion; Religion, Culture, and Theory; Religion in Translation; and Teaching Religious Studies. AAR presents awards each year to notable books in the study of religion. It offers three categories of Awards for Excellence: Analytical-Descriptive Studies, Historical Studies, and Constructive-Reflective Studies.

== Annual meeting ==
AAR hosts an annual meeting each year in November. The AAR annual meeting is the world's largest meeting for religious studies scholars. Over 400 events, including meetings, receptions, and academic sessions, occur on the AAR program alone; hundreds more, hosted by affiliated societies and institutions, occur over the course of the meeting. The location of the meeting changes each year. The annual meetings of the AAR are attended by about half their membership "(some 4,500 in 2014), which make these meetings by far the most important social arena for academic interaction" in comparison with meetings of other North American academic societies for the study of religion. The AAR annual meeting program is developed entirely by volunteers involved in program units representing disciplines and sub-disciplines within the field.

== Other activities ==
AAR offers activities on a regional level for its members. Professional development resources such as research grants, career services, and scholarships are some of the member benefits. AAR also advocates the importance of the critical study of religion on institutional and national levels.

== Presidents ==
The president is part of the board of directors, which is elected by AAR members each September and takes up their post at the close of each annual meeting.

- 1910–1925: Charles Foster Kent
- 1926: Irving Francis Wood
- 1927: Eliza H. Kendrick
- 1928: Walter W. Haviland
- 1929: Ralph K. Hickok
- 1930: Irwin R. Beiler
- 1931: Laura H. Wild
- 1932: Chester Warren Quimby
- 1933: James Muilenburg
- 1934: Elmer W. K. Mould
- 1935: Florence M. Fitch
- 1936: S. Ralph Harlow
- 1937: Frank G. Lankard
- 1938: Mary E. Andrews
- 1939: William Scott
- 1940: Harvie Branscomb
- 1941: Katherine H. Paton
- 1942–1943: Edgar S. Brightman
- 1944: Floyd V. Filson
- 1945: Mary Ely Lyman
- 1946: J. Paul Williams
- 1947: Rolland E. Wolfe
- 1948: Dwight M. Beck
- 1949: Vernon McCasland
- 1950: Virginia Corwin
- 1951: Mary Francis Thelen
- 1952: Charles S. Braden
- 1953: Carl E. Purinton
- 1954: W. Gordon Ross
- 1955: Arthur C. Wickenden
- 1956: A. Roy Eckardt
- 1957: Robert M. Montgomery
- 1958: H. Neil Richardson
- 1959: Lauren Brubaker Jr.
- 1960: Lionel Whiston Jr.
- 1961: Robert V. Smith
- 1962: Fred D. Geally
- 1963: Clyde A. Holbrook
- 1964: Ira Martin
- 1965: James Price
- 1966: William Hordern
- 1967: John Priest
- 1968: J. Wesley Robb
- 1969: Jacob Neusner
- 1970: Claude Welch
- 1971: James Tunstead Burtchaell
- 1972: Robert Michaelson
- 1973: Charles Long
- 1974: Christine Downing
- 1975: William F. May
- 1976: Preston Williams
- 1977: Schubert M. Ogden
- 1978: John Meagher
- 1979: Langdon Gilkey
- 1980: William Clebsch
- 1981: Jill Raitt
- 1982: Gordon D. Kaufman
- 1983: Wilfred Cantwell Smith
- 1984: Ray Hart
- 1985: Wendy Doniger
- 1986: Nathan A. Scott Jr.
- 1987: John Dillenberger
- 1988: Martin E. Marty
- 1989: Robert Wilken
- 1990: Elizabeth A. Clark
- 1991: Judith Berling
- 1992: Robert Cummings Neville
- 1993: Edith Wyschogrod
- 1994: Catherine Albanese
- 1995: Peter Paris
- 1996: Lawrence Sullivan
- 1997: Robert Detweiler
- 1998: Judith Plaskow
- 1999: Margaret R. Miles
- 2000: Ninian Smart
- 2001: Rebecca Chopp
- 2002: Vasudha Narayanan
- 2003: Robert Orsi
- 2004: Jane Dammen McAuliffe
- 2005: Hans J. Hillerbrand
- 2006: Diana L. Eck
- 2007: Jeffrey Stout
- 2008: Emilie Townes
- 2009: Mark Juergensmeyer
- 2010: Ann Taves
- 2011: Kwok Pui-lan
- 2012: Otto Maduro
- 2013: John Esposito
- 2014: Laurie Zoloth
- 2015: Thomas Tweed
- 2016: Serene Jones
- 2017: Eddie Glaude
- 2018: David P. Gushee
- 2019: Laurie L. Patton
- 2020: José I. Cabezón
- 2021: Marla F. Frederick
- 2022: Mayra Rivera
- 2023: Amir Hussain
- 2024: Jin Y. Park
- 2025: Leela Prasad
