= Maria Armengol =

Maria Armengol may refer to:

- Maria Antonia Armengol (born 1950), Spanish politician
- Maria Teresa Armengol, Andorran politician
