= Notes of a Native Son =

1955 essay collection by James Baldwin

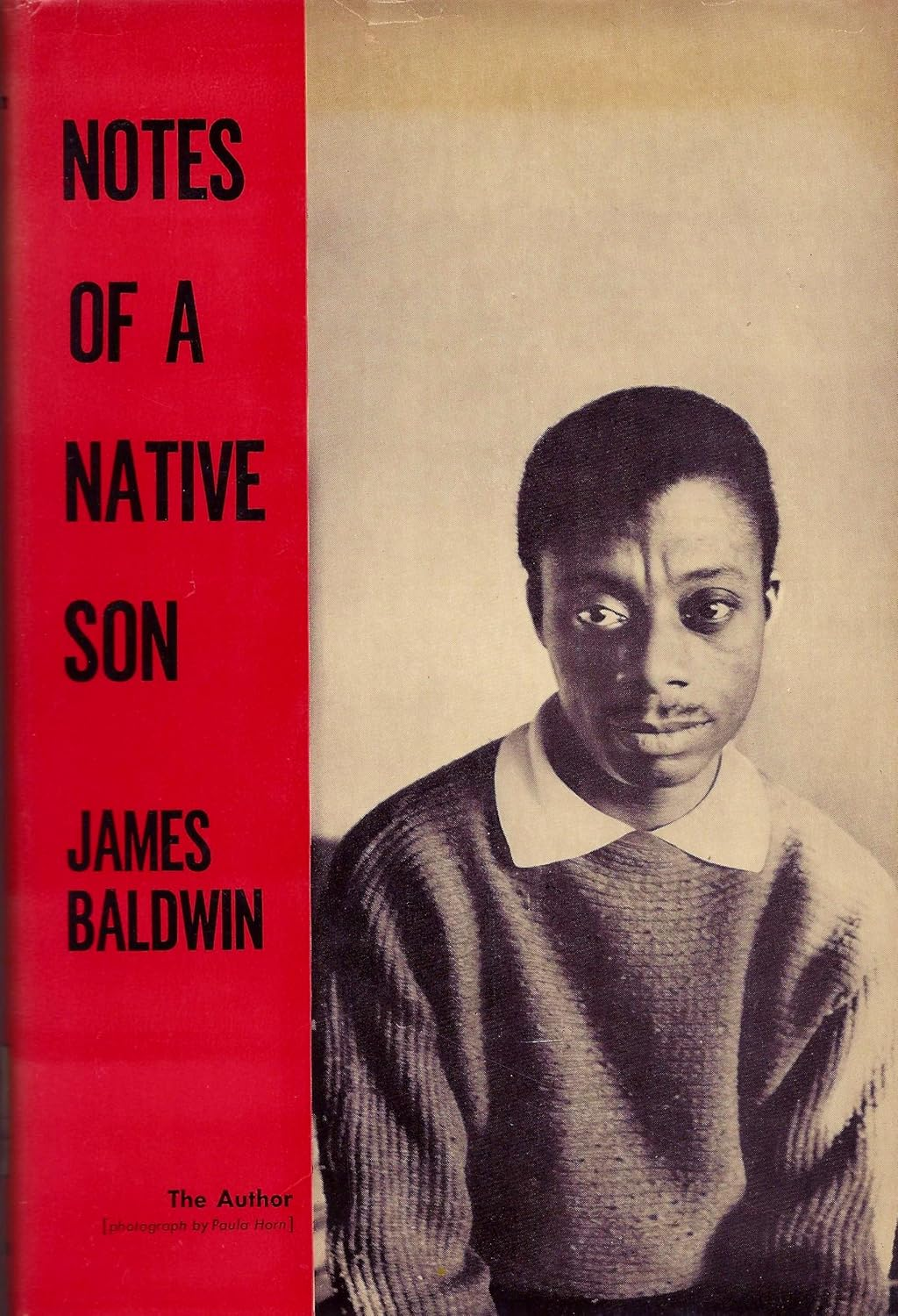
- First edition
- Author: James Baldwin
- Language: English
- Genre: Essays
- Publisher: Beacon Press
- Publication date: November 21, 1955
- Publication place: United States
- Pages: 165

Notes of a Native Son is a book of ten essays written by James Baldwin, first published in 1955. It was his debut nonfiction book, and it explores deep and personal themes, especially focusing on race, identity, and the Black experience in both America and Europe.

The volume is Baldwin’s first non-fiction book, and it compiles essays that had previously appeared in such magazines as Harper's Magazine, Partisan Review, and The New Leader.

Notes of a Native Son is widely regarded as a classic of the autobiographical genre. The Modern Library placed it at number 19 on its list of the 100 best 20th-century nonfiction books.

== Autobiographical notes ==
James Baldwin was born into poverty, on August 2, 1924. Growing up, Baldwin found refuge in reading books at the public library and began writing poems, short stories, and plays at a young age. Although Baldwin's father encouraged him to pursue a career as a preacher, Baldwin identified more strongly with writing. His formative experiences in the church influenced both his worldview and the rhetorical style of his writing, particularly through the use of voice, rhythm, and moral inquiry. Baldwin later reflected on how preaching informed his literary expression, even as he moved away from organized religion.

As Baldwin developed his identity as a writer, he confronted the challenges of working within a literary tradition shaped by European and American cultural influences. He was critical of certain portrayals of Black life in American literature, including those by fellow African-American writers. In particular, he disagreed with Richard Wright's depiction of the character Bigger Thomas in Native Son, arguing that the portrayal risked reinforcing limiting stereotypes. This debate highlighted Baldwin's focus on conveying the emotional and psychological complexities of Black identity.

In the late 1940s, Baldwin moved to Paris. His decision to live abroad was, in part, motivated by a desire to gain a critical distance from American racial dynamics. While living in France and elsewhere in Europe, Baldwin continued to engage with American social and political issues through his writing. His essays often explored the intersection of race, identity, and personal experience, reflecting a commitment to both literary craft and moral clarity.

Throughout his career, Baldwin expressed a desire to be both an honest writer and a principled individual, a goal reflected in much of his nonfiction work, including Notes of a Native Son.

== Part One ==
=== "Everybody's Protest Novel" ===
Baldwin criticizes Harriet Beecher Stowe's Uncle Tom's Cabin for being too overly emotional and for showing black slaves as looking to a "White God" to be saved and made pure. He believed this kind of emotional approach also appears in modern protest literature. Although he understands the good intentions behind these works, he argues that they fail to show the full complexity of Black Life and may even reinforce harmful stereotypes. He also disagrees with how Richard Wright's Native Son presents the character Bigger Thomas as an angry Black man, seeing it as a limiting and harmful portrayal for black men.

=== "Many Thousands Gone" ===
In Many Thousands Gone, James Baldwin examines how Black identity has been misrepresented in American culture, particularly through literature and dominant social perspectives. Focusing on Richard Wright’s Native Son and its protagonist, Bigger Thomas – a young black man who commits acts of violence – Baldwin critiques both the construction of the character and public reactions to him. He argues that Bigger functions more as a symbol shaped by societal fear and racism than as a fully developed individual. While acknowledging the significance of Wright’s work, Baldwin questions its emphasis on anger and violence as a means of expressing Black experience, suggesting it may unintentionally reinforce negative stereotypes. More broadly, Baldwin critiques the tendency of American society to project guilt and fear onto Black individuals rather than recognizing their full humanity. He calls for literature that portrays the complexity of Black life beyond protest narratives and simplistic representations.

=== "Carmen Jones: The Dark Is Light Enough" ===
In his essay Carmen Jones: The Dark is Light Enough, included in Notes of a Native Son (1955), James Baldwin critiques the 1954 film Carmen Jones, which featured Dorothy Dandridge and an all-black supporting cast. While the film was praised for its representation, Baldwin argues that it fails to reflect the realities of Black life. He criticizes the characters as lacking authenticity, with sanitized speech and settings that cater to white expectations. Baldwin also notes the prominence of light-skinned actors in leading roles, suggesting that colorism influenced casting decisions. He contends that the film projects white American fantasies onto Black characters rather than offering a meaningful portrayal of Black identity.

== Part Two ==
=== "The Harlem Ghetto" ===
Baldwin points to the very high rent in Harlem. Moreover, although there are black politicians, the President is white. On the black press, Baldwin notes that it emulates the white press, with its scandalous spreads. However the black Church seems to him to be a unique forum for the spelling out of black injustice. Finally, he ponders on antisemitism amongst blacks and comes to the conclusion that the frustration boils down to Jews being white, and more powerful than Negroes.

=== "Journey to Atlanta" ===
Baldwin tells the story that happened to The Melodeers, a group of jazz singers (including two of Baldwin's brothers) employed by the Progressive Party to sing in Southern Churches. However, once in Atlanta, Georgia, they were used for canvassing until they refused to sing at all and were returned to their hometown. Baldwin concludes the section by writing that the Melodeers were “not particularly bitter toward the Progressive Party, though they can scarcely be numbered among its supporters.”

=== "Notes of a Native Son" ===
Baldwin paints a vivid recollection of his time growing up with a paranoid father who was dying of tuberculosis, and his initial experience with Jim Crow style segregation. Prior to his father's death, Baldwin was befriended by a white teacher whom his father disapproved of. Later he worked in New Jersey and was often turned down in segregated places—Baldwin recalls a time he hurled a cup half full of water at a waitress in a diner only to realize his actions could have dire consequences. He goes on to say that blacks participating in military service in the South often got abused. Finally, he recounts his father's death which occurred just before his mother gave birth to one of his sisters; his father's funeral was on his 19th birthday, the same day as the Harlem riot of 1943.

== Part Three ==
=== "Encounter on the Seine: Black Meets Brown" ===
Baldwin draws a comparison between Black Americans and Black individuals living in France. He observes that while Black people in France often have a distinct cultural heritage and a country of origin to identify with, Black Americans do not share this connection. Instead, their roots are deeply tied to the United States, a nation that has historically marginalized them. Baldwin argues that the history of Black Americans is not something inherited from another land but is being shaped within the United States itself. This ongoing struggle for identity and belonging is central to the Black American experience, highlighting the unique challenges of forging a cultural and historical identity in a country that has long denied their full humanity.

=== "A Question of Identity" ===
Baldwin discusses the experiences of American students living in Paris. He observes that many arrive feeling excited but soon become confused by the cultural differences and want to return home. Baldwin uses this to explore how being in a new country can make people reflect on who they are. For Black Americans, he notes that living in Europe can feel freeing because the racial tensions are different from those in the U.S., but it also brings new challenges. The essay shows how identity is shaped by both personal background and environment, and how living abroad can lead to a deeper understanding of oneself.

=== "Equal in Paris" ===
Baldwin recounts being arrested in Paris during the Christmas season of 1949. The arrest occurred after an acquaintance stole a bedsheet from a hotel, which Baldwin unknowingly used. Despite his innocence, he was detained in a French jail, an experience that left a lasting impression on him. Baldwin reflects on his confusion and fear during the ordeal, highlighting his lack of understanding about how to deal with the police in a foreign country. The essay explores themes of vulnerability, alienation, and the cultural disorientation that can come with living abroad. It also illustrates Baldwin's growing awareness of how identity, race, and nationality can influence one's treatment by authority figures, even outside the United States.

=== "Stranger in the Village" ===
Baldwin recalls his time living in a small village in Switzerland, where he was the first Black person the villagers had ever seen. He reflects on the curiosity and naivety with which he was treated, noting how his presence highlighted the villagers' limited exposure to racial diversity. Baldwin contrasts this with the situation in the United States, where Black people have long been an integral part of the nation's history and culture. He observes that, unlike Europe where most Black populations were still largely tied to the colonies in Africa, America's identity has been deeply shaped by the presence and contributions of Black Americans. The essay explores themes of visibility, cultural difference, and the ways in which race is understood in different parts of the world.

== Critical reception ==
=== Introduction ===
James Baldwin's Notes of a Native Son (1955) is a collection of ten essays that mix personal stories with reflections on race in America. Over time, it has become a classic in both American nonfiction and African-American literature. The way people have responded to the book has changed over the years-from early reviews in the 1950s to more recent analysis by scholars and critics. This summary explores how the book had been viewed throughout the decades, including opinions from major reviewers and important literary voices to give a clear picture of its lasting impact.

=== Publication and initial reception (1950s) ===
Notes of a Native son was first published in 1955 by Beacon Press. Upon release, it initially garnered modest attention and sales - the first edition "did not sell well" - but a 1957 paperback reissue (following Baldwin's novel Giovanni's Room) brought the book wider readership, "outstanding reviews and brisk sales". Early critical commentary in the mid-1950s was very positive. Time Magazine praised Baldwin's voice in the collection as "written with bitter clarity and uncommon grace", signaling the book's forthright yet eloquent style. Kirkus Reviews, in a 1955 notice, lauded the essay's as a "compelling unit" of analysis on the "Negro experience" and applauded Baldwin's blend of poetic drama and social insight. Kirkus Reviews highlighted Baldwin's range from critiques of protest literature to personal reflection, and deemed it "Exceptional writing."

Though it took a few years to attract mainstream notice, by 1958 the collection received a high-profile in the New York Times Book Review from poet Langston Hughes. Hughes's review was glowing: he noted that James Baldwin "writes down to nobody" - in other words, Baldwin refuses to patronize or simplify - and that "as an essayist he is thought-provoking, tantalizing, irritating, abusing and amusing. And he uses words as the sea uses waves, to flow and beat, advance and retreat". Hughes observed that few American writers could handle the essay form more effectively than Baldwin; in Baldwin essays, "the thought becomes poetry, and the poetry illuminates the thought". While Hughes did point out that Baldwin's perspective was at times "half American, half Afro-American, incompletely fused" - suggesting the young writer was still integrating his viewpoints. The early review by such a literary luminary as Hughes cemented Baldwin's status as a serious new voice.

=== Modern reassessments and lasting legacy (1980s–2020s) ===
Since James Baldwin's death in 1987, Notes of Native Son has continued to attract critical and scholarly attention. The book is still widely read, assigned in academic settings, and often cited in discussion of twentieth-century American nonfiction and African-American literature. It has been listed in The Guardian's "100 best nonfiction books of all time", where critic Robert McCrum described Baldwin's essays as a "recent classic" and noted their "telling language" and exploration of Black identity in America. Scholar Henry Louis Gates Jr., quoted in the same article, commented that Baldwin "articulated for the first time to white America what it meant to be American and a black American at the same time"

In the 1990s and 2000s, literary biographer James Campbell highlighted Baldwin's skill in the essay form in Talking at the Gates: A Life of James Baldwin. Campbell observed that Baldwin's writing style allowed him to develop personal themes in a discursive way and pointed to Notes of a Native Son as a significant example of Baldwin's reflective method, especially in essays that address personal experiences like the death of his father and the 1943 Harlem riot.

The book has also gained renewed interest in recent years, particularly in light of ongoing conversations about race and social justice in the United States. The 2017 documentary I Am Not Your Negro, based on Baldwin's writings, introduced Baldwin's ideas to new audiences and contributed to discussions about the continuing relevance of his work.

Since its original publication in 1955, the critical reception of Notes of a Native Son has remained largely favorable. Initial reviews praised Baldwin's writing style and insight, and over time, literary figures such as Langston Hughes and Henry Louis Gates Jr. have offered positive assessments of the book's contributions to American letters. While there have been occasional dissenting perspectives, especially during politically charged periods such as the late 1960s, these have not significantly diminished the book's overall standing. Today, Notes of a Native Son is widely recognized as key work in Baldwin's career and in American nonfiction literature.
