= Christine Downing =

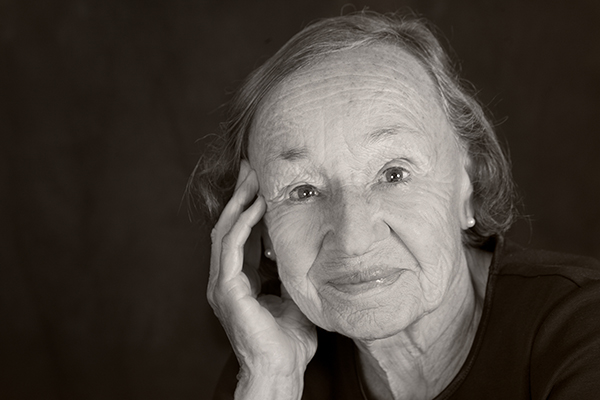
- Downing in 2008
- Born: Christine Downing; March 21, 1931 (age 95); Leipzig, Germany
- Occupations: Educator, Writer

Christine Downing (born March 21, 1931) is a scholar, educator, and author in the fields of mythology, religion, depth psychology, and feminist studies.

== Early life and education ==
Christine Downing was born in 1931 in Leipzig, Germany. Her mother, Herta Fischer Rosenblatt, was a pharmacist, poet, and co-founder of the Haiku Society of America. Her father, Dr. E. F. Rosenblatt, was a professor of Chemistry at the University of Leipzig. Dr. Rosenblatt, considered Jewish by the Nazi party, lost his professorial appointment in 1933, which prompted the family to emigrate to the United States. In 1935, they settled in New Jersey. Dr. Rosenblatt eventually became president of Engelhard Industries where his laboratory invented the first production catalytic converter in 1973. In 1952, Downing graduated from Swarthmore College with a major in literature. She was the first woman upon whom Drew University bestowed a doctorate, which she earned with a dissertation on the German philosopher and religious scholar, Martin Buber.

== Career ==
In 1963, Downing began teaching in the Religion Department at Rutgers University. In 1974, she transferred to San Diego State University, where she taught for eighteen years, including ten years as Chair of the University's Department of Religious Studies. Also in 1974, Downing became the first woman president of the American Academy of Religion. She delivered her presidential address on “Sigmund Freud and the Mythological Tradition.” While teaching in San Diego, Downing simultaneously served as a core faculty member at the California School of Professional Psychology, inspiring her to obtain a master's degree in family therapy from USIU.

In 1994, Downing assisted in the development of the Mythological Studies program at Pacifica Graduate Institute in Santa Barbara, where she remains a core faculty member, teaching courses in Greek and Roman mythologies, Hebrew traditions, and memoir. From 1995 through 2004, she delivered the annual Christine Downing Lectures at San Diego State University.

Downing has been recognized for her ability to blend self-reflective, biographical writing with rigorous scholarship. She has examined how Sigmund Freud and C.G. Jung’s notions of the self and the unconscious have transformed autobiographical thinking and writing and has often followed her own dreams as imperative departure points toward personal and scholarly investigations. Downing has written and lectured extensively about the relationship between the personal and the mythic, especially the psychological significance of Greek goddess mythologies, including those focused on Demeter and Persephone, and women's experience of male gods.

In October 2018, Downing received the Distinguished Educator Award from the International Forum for Psychoanalytic Education.

Her collection of professional and personal materials is housed at OPUS Archives and Research Center in Santa Barbara, California.

== Personal life ==
From 1951 to 1978, Downing was married to George V. Downing, a career chemist at Merck & Company, Inc. Between 1953 and 1958 they had five children: Peter Stalker Downing, Eric Steele Downing, Scott Drinker Downing, Christopher Lane Downing, and Sandra Leigh Downing.

When it became legally possible in 2008, Downing married poet and writer River Malcolm.

== Bibliography ==
The Goddess: Mythological Images of the Feminine (Crossroad, 1981)

Journey Through Menopause: A Personal Rite of Passage (Crossroad, 1987)

Psyche’s Sisters: Reimagining the Meaning of Sisterhood (Harper & Row, 1988)

Myths and Mysteries of Same Sex Love (Crossroad, 1989)

Women’s Mysteries: Toward a Poetics of Gender (Crossroad, 1992)

Gods In Our Midst: Mythological Images of the Masculine, A Woman’s View (Crossroad, 1993)

The Luxury of Afterwards (iUniverse, 2004)

Preludes: Essays on the Ludic Imagination, 1961-1981 (iUniverse, 2005)

Gleanings: Essays 1982-2006 (iUniverse, 2006)

Mythopoetic Musings, 2007-2018 (2018)

Editor, Mirrors of the Self (Tarcher, 1991)

Editor, The Long Journey Home: ReVisioning the Myth of Demeter and Persephone For Our Time (Shambhala, 1994)

Editor, Disturbances in the Field: Essays in Honor of David L. Miller (Spring Journal Books, 2006)
