= Leela Prasad =

Indian historian

- Occupation: Historian
- Awards: Guggenheim Fellowship (2023)

Academic background
- Education: Osmania University; University of Hyderabad; Kansas State University; University of Pennsylvania
- Thesis: Scripture and strategy: narrative and the poetics of appropriate conduct in Śṛingeri, South India (1998)

Academic work
- Discipline: History
- Sub-discipline: Anthropology of ethics; Indian history
- Institutions: Duke University; Brown University

Leela Prasad is an Indian historian based in the United States. A scholar of Indian history and the anthropology of ethics, she is a 2023 Guggenheim Fellow and is St. Purandar Das Distinguished Professor of Religious Studies at Brown University.

== Biography ==
She obtained her BA at Osmania University in 1986, her MAs at University of Hyderabad in 1988 and at Kansas State University in 1991, and her PhD in Folklore and Folklife at University of Pennsylvania in 1998; her doctoral dissertation was Scripture and strategy: narrative and the poetics of appropriate conduct in Śṛingeri, South India. In 1999, she started working at Duke University as Assistant Professor of Religion at the Department of Religious Studies, and he was an Andrew W. Mellon Assistant Professor from 2002 to 2003. She became an associate professor in 2007, and In 2020, she became a full professor. She also held an associate professorship at Duke's Department of Asian and Middle Eastern Studies from 2013 to 2015. In 2024, she moved from Duke to the Brown University Department of Religious Studies.

As an academic, Prasad specialises in the anthropology of ethics, early Indic philology, history of India, and oral history. She curated a Historical Society of Pennsylvania exhibition on the history of the South Asian Americans in the Delaware Valley, and she subsequently edited a tie-in 1999 volume Live Like the Banyan Tree. In 2006, she worked on two books: as co-editor of Gender and Story in South India and as author of Poetics of Conduct, for which she won the 2007 American Academy of Religion Best First Book in the History of Religions Award. In 2020, she released another book, The Audacious Raconteur. She was awarded a Guggenheim Fellowship in 2023. She served as vice president of the American Academy of Religion in 2023 and will become president in 2024, as well as the fourth Asian-American woman in the position. As of 2024, she and Baba Prasad are working as co-directors of Let Us See, a docufiction film on Mahatma Gandhi's 1944 interactions with a schoolteacher.

She is fluent in Hindi, Kannada, Marathi, and Telegu.

== Bibliography ==
- Live Like the Banyan Tree (1999)
- Gender and Story in South India (2006)
- Poetics of Conduct (2006)
- The Audacious Raconteur (2020)
