= Swimming in the Dark =

2020 Polish LGBT novel

- First edition (UK)
- Author: Tomasz Jędrowski
- Translator: Robert Sudół
- Language: English; Polish (transl.)
- Genre: Gay literature
- Publisher: Bloomsbury (UK); William Morrow (US); Osnova (POL)
- Publication date: February 6, 2020 (1st ed. UK Hardcover)
- Media type: Print
- Pages: 229 (1st ed. UK Hardcover)
- ISBN: 978-1526604965 (1st ed. UK Hardcover)
- OCLC: 1128857047

Swimming in the Dark is a 2020 novel by Polish writer Tomasz Jędrowski. This novel was subject to a "hotly contested" six-way publishing auction, from which Bloomsbury gained rights. After being first published in English by Bloomsbury in February, Robert Sudół's translation was released in Poland later in the month. The writer’s debut novel, it is a gay love story set in the closing years of the Polish People's Republic. It received praise for both its quality of writing and compelling story as well as its tactful treatment of its LGBTQ themes. It received at least one starred review from Publishers Weekly, and was later longlist-nominated for the HWA Debut Crown.

== Author ==
Jędrowski was born in 1985 in the Federal Republic of Germany. Jędrowski writes in English, which he attributed to English not having been "imposed on me. It's not something that I happened to be born into. It's just something I enjoyed from the very start, and I don't feel like it's my parents speaking through me when I'm writing in English, because we never spoke in English".

== Synopsis ==
Swimming in the Dark is a gay love story that takes place in the final years of the Polish People's Republic. The present time of the novel is the early 1980s. Ludwik, has emigrated from Poland to New York City where he follows the political situation in Poland on the news. Written in the first-person, Swimming In the Dark takes the form of a letter from Ludwik to his former lover in Poland, Janusz, recounting and reflecting on their past relationship.

Some years before, Ludwik, a recent college graduate, is spending his summer at an agricultural work camp in a rural part of the Polish People’s Republic. There he meets the slightly older Janusz, a working-class student from the countryside who has dedicated himself to the Communist Party as a way out of rural poverty. Ludwik has brought with him a contraband edition of Giovanni's Room by James Baldwin. Janusz asks Ludwig to lend him the book, and Baldwin's novel creates a shared awareness of their feelings for each other. After the camp closes and the other workers return to Warsaw, the two spend a few weeks camping in an isolated area, and, free from conformist social pressures, their romantic bond intensifies.

After returning to Warsaw, the pair must meet in increasingly furtive and clandestine ways. As the trade-union movement of the day begins to incite more general public protests, Ludwik and Janusz have opposing thoughts and reflexes about whether to support the protests or accommodate themselves to the existing political structures and enjoy the advantages that favoured party members accrue. Janusz is pulled toward a romantic alliance with a young woman with a powerful political father. A gay man from Ludwik's past is arrested and gives Ludwik's name as a homosexual to receive a lenient sentence. Discovered, Ludwik flees Poland.

== Background and development ==
Jędrowski cites Giovanni's Room by James Baldwin as a major influence in this writing, and Baldwin's novel plays a pivotal role in the novel: when the young protagonist Ludwik lends his copy to a stranger named Janusz, the two begin an intense sexual affair that plays out later in Warsaw in the 1980s during trade union agitation and a government crackdown.

Many regions of Poland declared themselves LGBT-free zones in 2019, and Polish president Andrzej Duda commented that "LGBT ideology [is] even more destructive than Communism". Jędrowski cited as another formative event for him the expulsion of Michel Foucault from Poland in 1958 after being ensnared by the authorities in a gay honey trap. He commented that "there's a lot of anxiety being channeled into this topic [LGBT rights in Poland], a lot of fear-mongering and propaganda" but that Swimming In the Dark is not only about homophobia, against which he writes "to revive, to resuscitate, the queerness that had been silenced". The novel is also, he said, "an homage and celebration of Polish culture, and the beauty of nature there".

== Publication ==
The novel was the subject of a six-way auction won by Bloomsbury for the UK and Commonwealth and William Morrow for North America, the latter part of a six-figure contract.

Bloomsbury published the work in English in the UK on February 6, 2020. The Polish publishing house Osnova published a simultaneous Polish translation by Robert Sudół as Płynąc w ciemnościach later that month on February 26. William Morrow published an English-language edition in North America on April 28 of the same year.

== Adaptations ==
In 2023, an opera libretto and score is in development, with libretto by Stephen Kitsakos and music by Martin Hennessy. A concert reading featuring four scenes from Act 1 was performed at Indiana University on January 20, 2024 at Auer Hall of the IU Jacobs School of Music.

== Reception ==
The Evening Standard summed up the novel as "elegant, compelling and full of melancholy beauty". Tim Pfaff, reviewing in the San Francisco Bay Area Reporter, highlighted the author's "nimble, refined English" in a novel composed "without a whiff of sentimentality." Pfaff praised Jędrowski for avoiding the cliché of "a timid gay man's unrequited infatuation for a handsome fellow student." He drew attention to Jędrowski's "mastery of the first-person" framework, noting that as Ludwik writes to Janusz, the second-person "you" startles the reader with "its fusion of intimacy and the inevitability of their separation." The Guardian described the novel as "an affecting and unusual romance, with a political undercurrent." The reviewer praised Jędrowski’s "elegant" prose, which "evokes the emotional honesty that the lovers first thrive in, and then the grimly repressive machinery" of the authoritarian state.

Publishers Weekly gave the novel a starred review and described it as a "dazzling debut [that] charts an evocative sexual awakening and coming of age amid political unease in early 1980s Poland".

Australia's Sydney Morning Herald described the novel as "grand and gorgeously written, as passionate, as shot through with melancholy as anything by Edmund White or Alan Hollinghurst." The reviewer predicted that Swimming In the Dark was "bound to become a queer literary classic" citing "its rather sweeping political dimension [which] breaks new ground in the genre."

In June 2020, Vogue India called the novel "the year’s best [LGBTQ-themed] debut so far" and mentioned Jędrowski's "beautiful" writing, "as measured in its tenor as it is evocative in its emotion." By the end of the year, Attitude magazine included the novel on its list of "20 Best LGBTQ Books of 2020," describing Jędrowski's debut as "one of the most astonishing contemporary gay novels we have ever read... Erotic, mesmeric, heartrending and brutal, this book is a masterpiece."
