= Go Tell It on the Mountain (novel) =

1953 novel by James Baldwin

Go Tell It On The Mountain
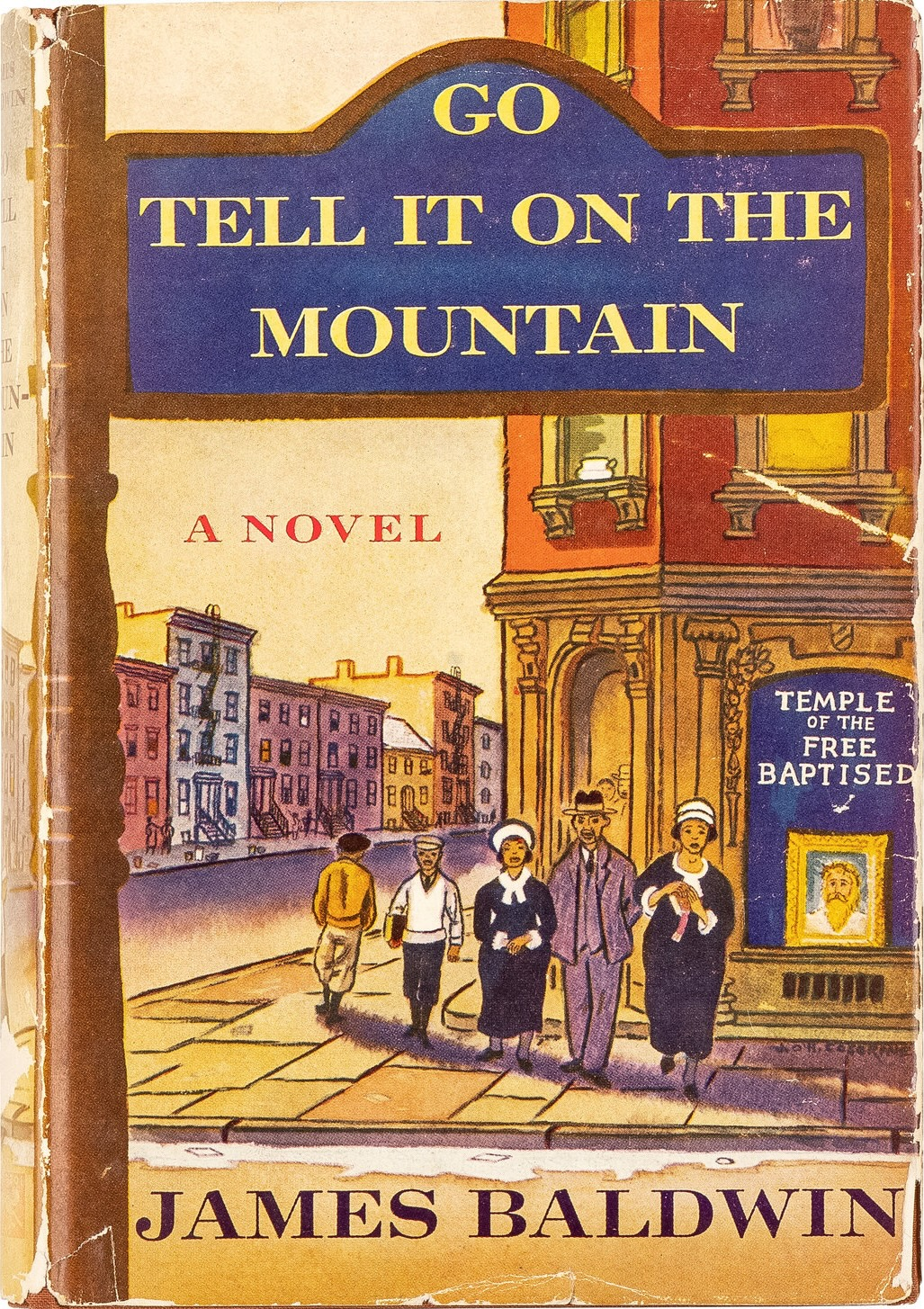
- First edition
- Author: James Baldwin
- Language: English
- Genre: Semi-autobiographical novel
- Publisher: Alfred A. Knopf
- Publication date: May 18, 1953
- Publication place: United States
- ISBN: 0-440-33007-6 (Paperback edition)
- OCLC: 24659110
- LC Class: PS3552 .A5 G6

Go Tell It on the Mountain is a 1953 semi-autobiographical novel by James Baldwin. It tells the story of John Grimes, an intelligent teenager in 1930s Harlem, and his relationship with his family and his church. The novel also reveals the back stories of John's mother, his biological father, and his violent, fanatically religious stepfather, Gabriel Grimes. The novel focuses on the role of the Pentecostal Church in the lives of African Americans, both as a negative source of repression and moral hypocrisy and a positive source of inspiration and community.

In 1998, the Modern Library ranked Go Tell It on the Mountain 39th on its list of the 100 best English-language novels of the 20th century. Time magazine included the novel on its list of the 100 best English-language novels released from 1923 to 2005.

== Background ==
James Baldwin was born in 1924 in Harlem to an unwed mother who had left Maryland for New York, and he never knew his biological father. Several years later, his mother married a much older laborer and Baptist preacher from Louisiana who had come north in 1919. James Baldwin took his step-father's surname and was raised as his son along with his many half-siblings. He later described his stepfather as "Brooding, silent, tyrannical ... and physically abusive, he was also a storefront preacher of morbid intensity." During his high school years, uncomfortable with the fact that, unlike many of his peers, he was becoming more sexually interested in men than in women, Baldwin sought refuge in religion. At the age of 14, he began preaching himself and continued to do so for several years.

Go Tell It on the Mountain was Baldwin's first published novel and it draws significantly on his personal experience and the experiences of those around him during his childhood in Harlem, particularly those who came to Harlem as part of the Great Migration from the South. It was the result of work that began in at least 1938. Baldwin showed an early manuscript to novelist Richard Wright in 1944. Wright helped Baldwin secure an advance from Harper & Brothers but the deal did not result in publication.

In February 1952, Baldwin sent a later version of the manuscript from Paris, France, where he was living at the time, to New York publishing house Alfred A. Knopf. They expressed interest, and Baldwin returned to New York to meet with Knopf. He agreed to rewrite parts of Go Tell It On The Mountain in exchange for a $250 advance ($3,031 today) and a further $750 ($9,093 today) paid when the final manuscript was completed. After the final draft was accepted, Baldwin published excerpts of the novel in two publications: one excerpt was published as "Exodus" in American Mercury and the other as "Roy's Wound" in New World Writing. Baldwin set sail back to Europe on August 28 and Go Tell It On The Mountain was published in May 1953.

== Structure and synopsis ==
Go Tell It on the Mountain has a nonlinear structure. The story takes place during one 24-hour period, but contains extended flashbacks that cover a period of more than 70 years. The novel is focused on John Grimes, but the narrative voice shifts between characters' perspectives, allowing access to the thoughts and reminiscences of John's father, mother, and aunt. The novel is divided into three parts: "Part One: The Seventh Day", "Part Two: The Prayer of the Saints" (divided into parts for Florence, Gabriel, and Elizabeth), and "Part Three: The Threshing-Floor". The first and final parts mainly follow John's thoughts, with glimpses of the thoughts of others, while the sections in Part Two mainly follow the thoughts of the character for whom they are named.

=== Part One ===
In Part One, John wakes up on his birthday. He sits down for breakfast, expecting something special from his mother. However, he is met with the regular breakfast that is standard in the household. His mother then sends him off to do his daily chores like any other day. As he does his chores, he thinks about his relationship with his domineering father, who does not seem to love him, and seems to have much hatred towards John. He also begins to think about his relationship with the storefront church at which his father is sometimes a preacher. The church is a major part in the life of John’s family. His family is extremely religious and spends a lot of their time at and supporting the church. His younger half-brother Roy also resents his father's strictness, but unlike John has begun to rebel by running with a rough crowd. The rebellion against his father leaves a lot of anger within John and builds upon the constant thought of their father not loving them. Once John has finished his chores, his mother Elizabeth gives him some money for his birthday, and he goes out. He walks through Central Park and down Fifth Avenue, before going into a movie theater to watch a film.

John returns home to find that Roy has gone with some neighborhood boys to pick a fight and has been cut with a knife. John's stepfather Gabriel returns home. Gabriel is angry. He lashes out and looks for someone to blame besides Roy. Gabriel ultimately ends up putting the blame onto Elizabeth and Gabriel’s own sister, Florence, who was in the house with the family at the time. Florence and Elizabeth object that no one is to blame but Roy since he went out to pick the fight. Gabriel strikes Elizabeth causing Roy to challenge and curse him. Gabriel takes immense disrespect from Roy and will not settle for it. He decides that as his father, he must do something to Roy because he believes Roy is in no place to challenge Gabriel and question his authority over him. Gabriel whips Roy with a belt until Florence intervenes. Gabriel does not appreciate Florence intervening and talks down to her. John then goes to the church to do chores before evening services. Elisha, an older boy in the church arrives to help and the two exchange playful barbs and then playfully wrestle. The two then finish cleaning the church while talking about John's soul and salvation. Two women arrive followed shortly by John's father, mother, and aunt Florence.

=== Part Two ===
==== Florence's Prayer ====
Florence recalls her childhood with Gabriel and their mother, a former slave. She recalls her devout mother leading them in prayer after the rape of a girl, Deborah, by a group of white men. She resented that just because Gabriel was a boy, her mother always put his future ahead of hers even though she was much better behaved. Florence eventually left home despite her mother's illness to go north to New York where she met Frank, whom she married. The marriage was not happy as Frank drank and was irresponsible with money, both buying her extravagant gifts and spending on binges. He eventually left her for another woman and died in France in World War I. Florence, on her death bed, recalls a letter she received from Deborah, Gabriel’s wife, about her suspicions of him having a bastard child. Florence loathes her brother, believing he has no right to be a preacher. As she passes she sees visions of her mother calling her upon the altar.

==== Gabriel's Prayer ====
Gabriel also recalls his wild youth, which ended after Florence left when he was saved at the age of 22. He stopped drinking and debauching and became a preacher. Deborah, whom no one would marry because she had been raped, supports him and helps him after his mother dies and Gabriel asks her to marry him. Back in the church, Gabriel hears a cry of praise and worries that John is being visited by the Holy Spirit. He resents that his two natural sons have not been saved and worries that John, who is not his biological son, will be saved. He had an affair with a woman named Esther, who subsequently became pregnant and died giving birth to his son, Royal. Royal was raised by Esther's mother and Gabriel never acknowledged him and worried that Deborah would learn the truth. Later, during a period of racial tensions after a black soldier has been lynched, Gabriel encountered Royal walking home and warned him to be careful. Later, Deborah tells Gabriel that Royal left for Chicago where he was killed in a knife fight. Deborah confronts Gabriel, who admits that Royal was his son and Deborah tells him he should pray for forgiveness. Seeing John, Gabriel recalls that he had believed that meeting and marrying Elizabeth was a sign that God had forgiven him.

==== Elizabeth's Prayer ====
Elizabeth recalls how after the death of her distant mother, her aunt took her away from her father, whom she loved, because he ran a brothel. Elizabeth resented her and she was never loving. Later, Elizabeth fell in love with a store clerk, Richard. The two ran away to New York together. Although they were not married, Elizabeth became pregnant but did not tell Richard right away. Before she told him, he was wrongfully arrested for theft. He refused to confess and was brutally beaten by the police. After he was eventually acquitted and returned home, she decided not to tell him she was pregnant that night, but by morning he had killed himself. After thinking of Richard, she looks at John and wonders if she did the right thing to keep him rather than give him for adoption, and to marry Gabriel who has never loved John. She recalls how she met Florence at her job as a cleaning woman and Florence introduced her to her brother Gabriel, now a widower who recently came north. Although Florence discourages the romance, Elizabeth respects Gabriel's religiosity and believes Gabriel will offer protection and stability for herself and John and agrees to marry him. Her thoughts return to the present and she sees John lying on the floor of the church overcome by a religious vision.

=== Part Three ===
John experiences a series of hallucinatory religious visions in which he confronts many of his sins, hopes, and doubts. He sees his father's face and recalls that he has seen his father naked and compares himself to the story of Ham who saw his father Noah naked and was forever cursed – a story that was long used to justify slavery and oppression of black people. After further visions, John sees a glimpse of God and feels himself saved. He returns to consciousness and realizes that it is morning and he has been there all night. All are happy for him except Gabriel who seems unconvinced. The group leaves the church to walk home and Florence, who is terminally ill, confronts Gabriel with a letter from Deborah which reveals her suspicions that Gabriel had fathered a son with Esther. Florence accuses Gabriel of making John and Elizabeth suffer to expiate his own guilt for his sin with Esther and Royal and promises to reveal the truth to Elizabeth. Meanwhile, John speaks with Elisha who congratulates and encourages him until they reach John's home.

== Setting ==
The novel takes place in New York City, primarily in Harlem in 1935. The flashbacks provide extended sequences in the American South, primarily in an unnamed town in the Deep South where Gabriel and Florence were born, and in Maryland where Elizabeth was raised. The flashbacks also recall earlier periods in Harlem and to a lesser extent other locations in New York.

In the novel, New York City at once represents freedom and opportunity – especially for Florence and Elizabeth, who escape confining family lives, and for John, who contemplates the opportunities of the world outside Harlem as he walks through Midtown Manhattan – but also the vulgarity and perdition, particularly for Gabriel and through Gabriel, for John. This duality is used to enhance the other conflicts in the novel, particularly between holiness and worldliness and between John and Gabriel. For Elizabeth especially, but also for Florence and Gabriel, the promise of the city, the promise that drove the Great Migration of African Americans from the rural South to Northern cities including New York, turned out to be false. Elizabeth reflects that unlike the South, which promises nothing, the North promises but does not give and what is given can be taken away in an instant. Although the Great Migration led to the Harlem Renaissance and a flourishing of art and culture, the novel's depiction of Harlem is focused on the poverty, violence, drunkenness, and sexual depravity which were also a result.

== Themes ==
=== Religion ===
The religious theme pervades all aspects of the novel. However, critics have not agreed on whether it is "an ironic indictment of Christianity" or a "stirring vindication". Barbara Olson summarized the dispute noting that "those favoring vindication number in their ranks such notable critics as Albert Gerard, Donald Gibson, and Shirley Allen" while "those favoring the indictment position include Robert Bone, Michel Fabre, Nathan Scott, Howard Harper, Stanley Macebuh, David Foster and Trudier Harris."

==== Holiness versus worldliness ====
Many scholars have reflected on the tension between holiness and worldliness in the novel. The strict Pentecostal religion of the Temple of the Free Baptized, enforced by John's father, demands that believers live separately from much of the world around them. Much of Part One is taken up with John's thoughts on how he fits in or fails to fit in both with the "holy" people of his father's church and also with the "worldly" people he knows from the neighborhood and school. Charles Scruggs writes that the novel juxtaposes "the earthly and the heavenly, and together they help focus the novel's various themes."

==== Religious allusion ====
The novel is rich with biblical and religious allusions and references. The title of the novel is taken from a spiritual of the same name and "each of the three parts has a title and two epigraphs referring to the Bible or Christian hymns, and each of the prayers in Part Two begins with a quotation from a hymn." The title of Part One "The Seventh Day" is a clear reference to the biblical sabbath, the day on which the Lord rested after he created the heavens and the earth. Allen argues this is both the day John is done being "created", i.e. when he comes into his own, but God also made the Sabbath holy, and it is the day John will become holy. Similarly, Part Three "The Threshing-Floor" is an allusion to Matthew 3:12, in which John the Baptist states that on the threshing floor Jesus will separate the wheat (saved) from the chaff (unsaved).

Baldwin includes excerpts from many spirituals throughout the novel but especially as John is undergoing his religious vision and the "saints" of the church sing around him, each of which highlights a particular aspect of the narrative. In addition, many of the characters' names refer directly to biblical characters. Critics have compared John both to John the Baptist and John of Patmos who experienced a religious vision in the Book of Revelation. John the Baptist's mother Elizabeth, the archangel Gabriel, the prophetess Deborah, and the Jewish Queen Esther also provide names of significant characters.

Baldwin frequently makes use of direct references including the story of Ham, the story of Moses leading the Israelites out of Egypt, and the story of Lot's wife who looked backward and was turned into a pillar of salt. Other passages, such John's wrestling with Elisha evoke biblical referents, like the story of Jacob wrestling with a mysterious supernatural being in Genesis.

==== Language ====
The rhythm and language of the story draw heavily on the language of the Bible, particularly of the King James Version. Many of the passages use the patterns of repetition identified by scholars such as Robert Alter and others as being characteristic of Biblical poetry. In addition, much of the characters' speech is laced with biblical quotations and references, which both provides a note of verisimilitude in the dialogue but also a layer of religious symbolism.

=== Race ===
Most critics and scholars have agreed that while race is not the core of the book, it remains an important theme. Shirley Allen wrote, "obviously Baldwin weaves the black-versus-white theme into the central conflict as inextricably as it is woven into the daily consciousness of the characters; but the major conflict of this novel ... is not black against white, but the more universal problem of youth achieving maturity." New York Times reviewer Orville Prescott said in his contemporary assessment that, although the novel is not primarily about race, "Mr. Baldwin is as bitter about race discrimination in a few passing references as many authors are in whole books."

Race comes to the fore for each character in different ways. John questions his father's visceral animosity towards white people, while at the same time feeling acutely aware of his blackness as he leaves Harlem and walks through other parts of the city. Already feeling alienated from the secular culture of Harlem (which has sucked in Roy, who at the same time has gone to pick a fight with white boys in another neighborhood), and from the religious culture represented by his father ("His father said that all white people were wicked, and the God was going to bring them low"), he wonders about the promise of other opportunities in these white-dominated spaces, such as the New York Public Library, which he does not enter (but not, he tells himself, because he is black) and the movie theater, which he finds, despite his momentary trepidation, admits him without comment on his race.

Deborah's rape as an adolescent at the hands of a group of white men, and later a brutal lynching and castration of a black soldier highlight the violence of racism in the South for both Florence and Gabriel. It is noteworthy that Florence's prayer features a rape, reinforcing the status of black women, already highlighted by their mother's favoritism toward Gabriel as the son. Gabriel's prayer features castration, just as he encounters his unacknowledged son and feels acutely his inability to protect him from danger and his biological son's estrangement from him. Elizabeth's prayer reinforces that African Americans have not escaped racism by coming north; the brutal treatment of Richard at the hands of the police and the justice system causes his suicide.

=== Sexuality ===
Sex and sexuality are important throughout the novel, particularly for John and Gabriel. The novel engages with traditional religious views of sexuality as something sinful that is to be avoided. The church's stigmas surrounding sexuality impressed on him by his father, have severely impacted John's perspective on sexuality. Several critics have viewed John's religious rebirth in terms of him coming to terms with his sexuality, both as a gay man and as a black man.

Critics have noted the "constant repetition of such phrases as 'the natural man' and 'the old Adam'" in condemnation of man's sexual desire. This conflict is central for John, who at the start of the novel is reflecting on his own "sin" (masturbation) and his burgeoning sexuality. Many scholars read John's conversion as a rejection of his father's strict sexual mores. Angelo Robinson argues that because the novel "alters the traditional Pentecostal conversion experience in that John is not 'cured,' 'healed,' or 'delivered' from his sexual desire during his rebirth" but is "'restored' to confront the reality of his sexual desires while at the same time claiming the promise of salvation" and is ultimately "freed from Gabriel's faith with its severe sexual ethic". Furthermore, Baldwin often used sexual language and imagery in describing religious zeal. This is particularly noticeable when Elisha is called before the congregation to be chastised for his nascent relationship with a girl, Ella Mae, he is described with his "head thrown back, eyes closed, sweat standing on his brow", "stiffened and trembles", "cried out Jesus, Jesus, oh Lord Jesus!", "face congested", and "his body could not contain this passion".

John's homosexuality is also at issue in the novel, though John himself spends less time concerned directly with the kind of his sexual desire than he does with its existence at all. Nevertheless, given the autobiographical details in the novel, scholars have interrogated how John's experience reflects Baldwin's search for an identity as a gay man and perhaps his reflections on his own homosexuality after many years of being out. Because the issue is not addressed directly, scholars have evaluated John's homosexuality through the lens of other themes in the book. "John's struggles with his homosexuality provide the window through which to understand the complexity of his struggles with his spirituality." John's conversation with Elisha and Elisha's kiss led Stanley Macebuh to argue that John's salvation is through homosexual love though others have argued that goes too far. Yet Mason Stokes perhaps goes even further, arguing that both John's struggle against his father and his religious conversion reflect his struggle against "a heterosexuality that terrorizes" him, which is reflected in the conflict between Gabriel's obsession with descendants and his strict religious sexual code. The novel's depictions of heterosexuality (rape, prostitution, adultery, loveless marriages) is contrasted with John's love for Elisha, which "somehow purer, more loving, than the novel's often perverse heterosexual expressions".

Other critics have examined the ties between race and sexuality in the novel. Andrew Connolly draws a connection between Gabriel's guilt over his sexuality and the "persistent racial stereotypes surrounding black male sexuality and the thread of violence that accompanies those stereotypes" and argues that John's conversion represents "the unrealized potential that black men can resist systemic pressures and embrace their sexuality without confirming racist stereotypes." This connection is highlighted as Gabriel recalls the body of a black soldier who has been castrated and lynched.

=== Family ===
John's religious struggle is also parallel to his struggle with his father. At the end of the novel, in his moment of "salvation", John is knocked to the ground by the Holy Ghost. He then hears a voice that says, "Get up, John, Get up boy. Don't let him keep you there. You got everything your Daddy got". In this way, his religious revelation, while representing an acceptance of his father's religion, also reflects his rejection of his father's authority and the burgeoning of his own individuality, rather than merely accepting the role his father has created for him within the family.

Other relationships throughout the novel also cast light on the notion of family including Gabriel's emotionally and physically sterile marriage to Deborah, Elizabeth's adoption by her aunt and abandonment by her father, Florence's resentment toward her mother, Gabriel's lack of relationship with his biological son Royal, Elizabeth's relationship with John's biological father Richard, Florence's marriage to the unreliable Frank, and Florence and Gabriel's mother's reflections on her lovers and children while still a slave.

=== Guilt ===
An early reviewer noted that "Guilt, guilt, guilt chimes through the book. Gabriel is guilty. His first wife Deborah is guilty though she was the victim of rape. His second wife Elizabeth is guilty, though she loved much. Guilt is visited on his children." The novel opens with John feeling guilty about his masturbation and sexual desires. This is mirrored in the young Gabriel's guilt about his own sexual transgressions, which ultimately lead to his conversion. However, Gabriel's guilt about his later inability to live up to his own conversion ideals haunts him and is ultimately the cause of his conflict with John: "John becomes a focal point for [Gabriel's] sense of guilt, encapsulating all the other people who make Gabriel feel guilty" such as Deborah, Esther, Royal, Roy, and Elizabeth; "Gabriel's hatred of John is rooted in his guilt over and his denial of his failures as a father." Meanwhile, Elizabeth accepts Gabriel's abuse and tyranny partly as a form of divine punishment on both her and John for her guilt, guilt both for not repenting her love for Richard and for her failure to save him from his suicide.

=== Women ===
Though the novel is primarily focused on John and his conflict with Gabriel, female characters play an important role in the novel and explore women's role in society. Florence's prayer in particular articulates a nascent feminism. Although Florence is five years older than her brother Gabriel, he was given the education and respect that Florence desired. Although raised by a single mother, the patriarchal environment meant that Gabriel's future matters more than Florence's. Mason Stokes notes that Florence rejects "the regulatory regimes of the heteropatriarchal household"; not only does she reject the men who lusted after her beauty "not wishing to exchange her mother's cabin for theirs and to raise their children", her final act is to undermine Gabriel's authority by promising to reveal his prior infidelity and abandonment of his son Royal to Elizabeth and the church community.

== Adaptations ==
The Public Broadcasting Service produced a made-for-television movie based on Go Tell It on the Mountain in 1984. Stan Lathan directed the film, with Paul Winfield starring as Gabriel in his adulthood and Ving Rhames playing Gabriel in his youth. Baldwin was pleased with the adaptation, saying in an interview with The New York Times: "I am very, very happy about it ... It did not betray the book."

The novel has been translated into numerous languages, including Swedish, French, Japanese, Finnish, German, Italian, Polish, Norwegian, Spanish, Russian, Portuguese, Czech, Arabic, and Dutch.

== Reception ==
Go Tell It on the Mountain was widely praised at its publication and since. It received favorable reviews in The New York Times, The Virginia Quarterly Review, The Hudson Review, and Phylon, among others.

Writing a decade later, Wallace Graves noted in a highly critical essay, that "when the book was reviewed in the summer of 1953, critics were most generous in praise, and except for Anthony West in The New Yorker ... Baldwin was welcomed almost carte blanche as a brilliant young novelist of great promise."

It is generally regarded as Baldwin's best novel and as one of the great African American novels of the 20th Century. In 1998, the Modern Library ranked Go Tell It on the Mountain 39th on its list of the 100 best English-language novels of the 20th century. Time included the novel on its list of the 100 best English-language novels released from 1923 to 2005. Publisher Franklin Library included it in its "100 Greatest Masterpieces of American Literature" collection published from 1976-1984 for the American Bicentennial.

The novel is regularly assigned as part of curricula in high schools and colleges. However, its assignment has also aroused controversy. In 1988, a teacher in Prince William County, Virginia, offered the book as a ninth-grade summer reading option. Parents challenged the book because it is "rife with profanity and explicit sex". In 1994, the book was challenged in Hudson Falls, New York, after a teacher had assigned the book as required reading. Parents challenged the book because of "recurring themes of rape, masturbation, violence, and degrading treatment of women".

== See also ==
- James Baldwin in France
