= Jill Raitt =

American professor (1931–2025)

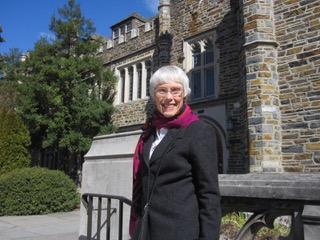
Jill Raitt, first woman to receive tenure at Duke Divinity School, standing outside the Duke Chapel

Jill Raitt (May 1, 1931 – May 27, 2025) was an American professor who became the first woman to receive tenure at Duke Divinity School and the second woman elected president of the American Academy of Religion. She was influential in the increasing acceptance of women in professional ministerial positions.

== Early life ==
Jill Raitt was born on May 1, 1931, in Los Angeles, California, the daughter of Neysa Atherton Raitt and Arthur Taylor Raitt. She grew up in Eagle Rock with one older brother, Richard Arthur Raitt. As a child, Raitt enjoyed adventure and time spent outside. While working on a cattle ranch during high school, she developed an attachment to horses and farms that would follow her into adulthood.

== Education ==
After graduating from Santa Monica High School as salutatorian in 1949, Raitt began her first year at Radcliffe College where she studied Latin and English. After her sophomore year, Raitt worked as a nanny and studied in Rome for nine months. In Rome, she attended the General Historicum of the Society of Jesus where she studied philosophy and theology under the guidance of E. J. Burrus. During this time Raitt felt called to join the Society of the Sacred Heart of Jesus. Upon returning from Rome, Raitt transferred from Radcliffe College to San Francisco College for Women, run by the Religious of the Sacred Heart of Jesus, where she studied philosophy, graduating in 1953.

After graduation, Raitt joined the Society of the Sacred Heart of Jesus and spent eleven years in the cloister. During these eleven years, she lived in upstate New York, California, and Rome. In the summer of 1964, after leaving religious life, Raitt enrolled at Marquette University to continue her theological education. She primarily dedicated her research to medieval and reformation theology, completing her Master's in Theology in 1965. She then entered the University of Chicago Divinity School. Raitt was among the first Roman Catholics to enroll in the Divinity School. She received her PhD in Theology from the University of Chicago in 1970. While completing her dissertation, titled "The Conversion of the Elements in Reformed Eucharistic Theology with Special Reference to Theodore Beza," Raitt took a teaching position at the University of California, Riverside in 1969, where she taught for four years.

== Duke Divinity School ==
In 1973, Raitt joined the faculty of Duke Divinity School in Durham, North Carolina, as an associate professor; she taught at Duke until 1981. She was the first woman on the school's faculty. Her mother lived with her in Durham. To aid students in their effort to make Duke Divinity more inclusive of women, Raitt donated her office to start the school's Women's Center. In August 1975, Raitt moved to Cambridge, Massachusetts to spend a year as a National Endowment for the Humanities fellow and a fellow of the Radcliffe Institute. While in Cambridge, Raitt was diagnosed with breast cancer. After a year in Cambridge, Raitt returned to Durham in May 1975, where she underwent two years of chemotherapy. The treatment was successful in eliminating her breast cancer. In 1977, she was granted tenure, making her the first woman to receive tenure at Duke Divinity School.

== University of Missouri ==
In 1981, Raitt was invited by the University of Missouri in Columbia, Missouri to found a Department of Religious Studies. That same year the Divinity School of the University of Chicago named Raitt Alumna of the Year. After establishing a successful department, Raitt taught full time at the University of Missouri from 1981 to 2001. After retirement, she continued teaching part time from 2002 to 2008. In 2008, she began a three-year term at Fontbonne University (in Missouri) as the Sisters of St. Joseph of Carondelet Endowed Chair in Catholic Thought, followed by an appointment as visiting professor at Saint Louis University. She returned to the University of Missouri as a part-time visiting professor in 2013.

== American Academy of Religion ==
In 1972, Raitt was elected the national secretary of the American Academy of Religion, a position she held for three years. In 1979, she was elected vice president, then president elect, and finally president of the American Academy of Religion. In 1981, Raitt was awarded fellowships from the National Endowment for the Humanities and the National Center for the Humanities in Research Triangle Park, North Carolina, an honor she declined because of her appointment at the University of Missouri. Several years later, during the 1987–1988 academic year, Raitt was accepted a fellowship at the National Humanities Center in Research Triangle Park, North Carolina.

== Writing ==
Raitt published and edited five books and numerous articles.

- The Colloquy of Montbéliard: Religion and Politics in the Sixteenth Century (1993)
- The Eucharistic Theology of Theodore Beza: The Development of the Reformed Tradition (1972, reprinted 1987)
- Encyclopedia of the Reformation (1996),
- Christian Spirituality: High Middle Ages and Reformation: ed. (1987)
- Shapers of Traditions in Germany, Switzerland and Poland, 1560-1600 (1981)

== Legacy ==
Raitt died on May 27, 2025, at the age of 94, in Columbia, Missouri. She was remembered for her advocacy for women in academia and ministry.
