= Margaret R. Miles =

American theologian and historian (born 1937)

President of the American Academy of Religion
- In office 1999–2000
- Preceded by: Judith Plaskow
- Succeeded by: Ninian Smart

Dean of the Graduate Theological Union
- In office 1996–2001

Personal details
- Born: May 18, 1937 (age 89) Lancaster, Pennsylvania, U.S.
- Education: San Francisco State University; Graduate Theological Union
- Occupation: Theologian; historian
- Awards: Guggenheim Fellowship (1982)

Academic background
- Thesis: Augustine's idea of the meaning and value of the body in relation to the whole personality (1977)

Academic work
- Discipline: Theology; History of religion
- Institutions: Harvard Divinity School; Graduate Theological Union

Margaret Ruth Miles (born May 18, 1937) is an American theologian and historian who was president of the American Academy of Religion in 1999 and dean of the Graduate Theological Union from 1996 to 2001. A 1982 Guggenheim Fellow, she has written and edited dozens of books, including Augustine on the Body (1979), Image as Insight (1985), Immaculate and Powerful (1985), Shaping New Vision: Gender and Values in American Culture (1987), Seeing and Believing: Religion and Values in the Movies (1997), Plotinus on Body and Beauty (1999), Carnal Knowing (2006), Desire and Delight (2006), and A Complex Delight (2008).

== Biography ==
Margaret Ruth Miles was born on May 18, 1937, in Lancaster, Pennsylvania. After obtaining her BA (1969) and MA (1971) in San Francisco State University, she worked as an instructor at Columbia College and Modesto Junior College. She obtained her PhD from the Graduate Theological Union (GTU) in 1977; her dissertation was named St. Augustine's idea of the meaning and value of the body in relation to the whole personality. In 1979, her dissertation was republished as Augustine on the Body as part of the American Academy of Religion Dissertation Series.

Miles moved to Harvard Divinity School (HDS), where she was assistant professor of theology from 1978 to 1981, when she was promoted to associate professor. In 1985, she was granted tenure, the first woman at HDS to be so. She also served as HDS' department of theology. She later returned to her alma mater GTU, where she worked as their dean from 1996 to 2001. In addition, she worked at the American Baptist Seminary of the West as a professor of historical theology.

In 1982, Miles was awarded a Guggenheim Fellowship for "a study of visual formulations of Christian theology in the Middle Ages"; this fellowship funded her book Image as Insight. She edited two volumes with Clarissa W. Atkinson and Constance Buchanan: Immaculate and Powerful (1985) and Shaping New Vision: Gender and Values in American Culture (1987). She later wrote several academic books on religion: Seeing and Believing: Religion and Values in the Movies (1997), Plotinus on Body and Beauty (1999), The Word Made Flesh (2004), A Complex Delight (2008), and On Memory, Marriage, Tears and Meditation (2021). In 1999, she was president of the American Academy of Religion. She has also released several religion books through Wipf and Stock, including Carnal Knowing (2006) and Desire and Delight (2006).

== Bibliography ==
- Augustine on the Body (1979)
- Image As Insight (1985)
- (ed. with Clarissa W. Atkinson and Constance Buchanan) Immaculate and Powerful (1985)
- (ed. with Clarissa W. Atkinson and Constance Buchanan) Shaping New Vision: Gender and Values in American Culture (1987)
- Practicing Christianity: Critical Perspectives for an Embodied Spirituality (1988)
- The Image and Practice of Holiness (1989)
- Reading for Life (1997)
- Seeing and Believing: Religion and Values in the Movies (1997)
- Plotinus on Body and Beauty (1999)
- The Word Made Flesh (2004)
- Carnal Knowing (2006)
- Desire and Delight (2006)
- Fullness of Life (2006)
- A Complex Delight (2008)
- Bodies in Society: Essays on Christianity in Contemporary Culture (2008)
- Rereading Historical Theology (2008)
- Augustine and the Fundamentalist’s Daughter (2011)
- Getting Here from There (2011)
- The Wendell Cocktail (2012)
- Beyond the Centaur (2014)
- The Long Goodbye (2017)
- Recollections and Reconsiderations (2018)
- On Memory, Marriage, Tears and Meditation (2021)
- Beautiful Bodies (2024)
