= James Baldwin in France =

Expatriation as an influence on Baldwin's work

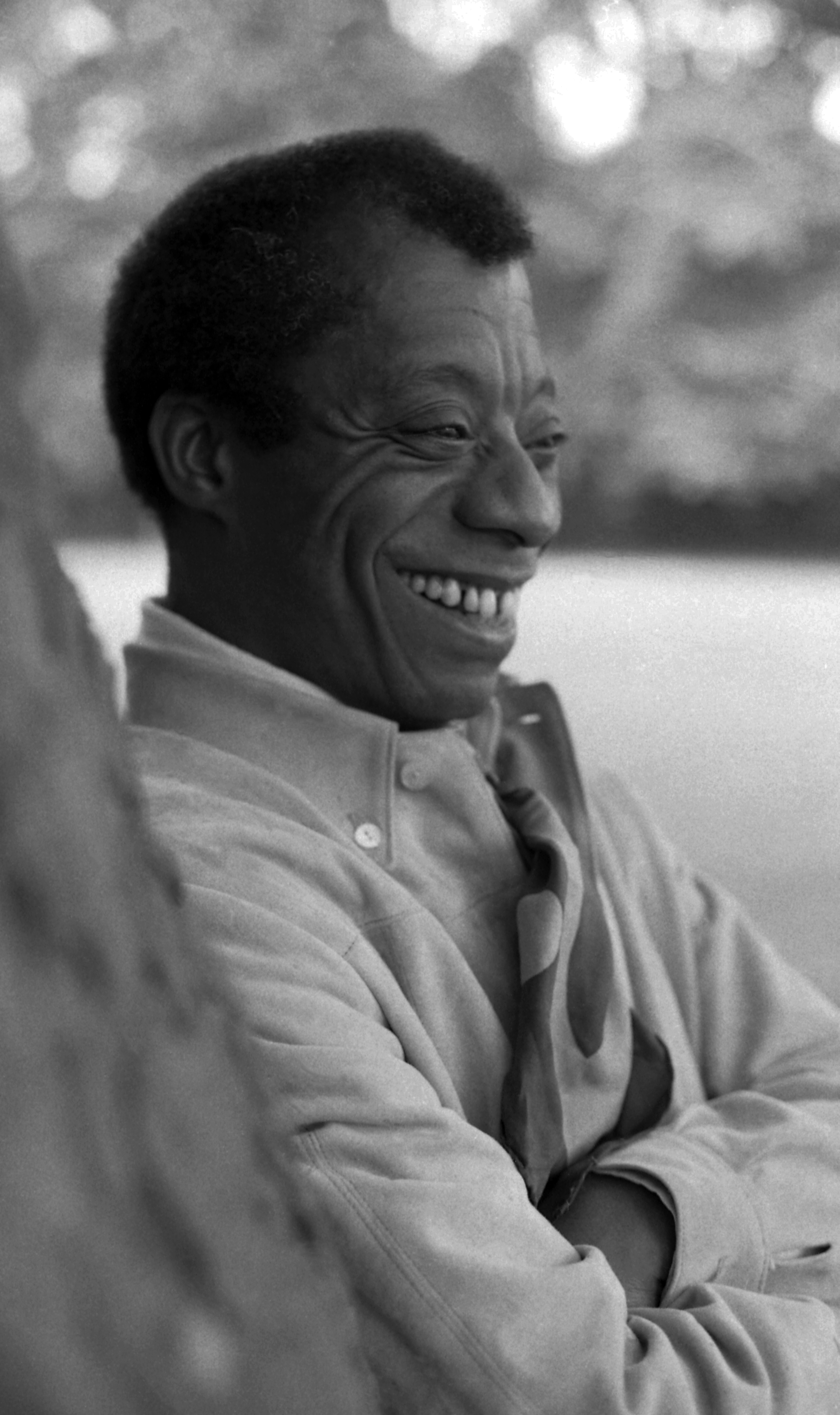
Baldwin in 1969, Hyde Park, London

Writer and activist James Baldwin (1924–1987) was born in and lived his entire childhood and adolescence in Harlem, New York City. He expatriated and lived most of his adult life in France, though he traveled frequently and had extended stays in other countries (Switzerland and Turkey). He lived in Paris for nine years and in Saint-Paul-de-Vence for 17 years. France and his other stays abroad provided him with a vantage point for observing his own American culture, which was the main subject of his work.

== Prelude to expatriation ==
Baldwin described his primary motive for leaving New York as one of self-preservation. He was afraid that, if he stayed, his anger about the racial situation in the United States would inexorably lead to his own death. For him, exile was a survival strategy preserving him from "madness, violence and suicide". A close friend of his, political activist Eugene Worth (whom Baldwin described as a "black man I loved with all my heart"), died by suicide in December 1946, an act that Baldwin saw as an inward-turning and self-destructive response to the ambient racism.

His homosexuality further complicated his relationship with his home country (at the time, sodomy was a crime in many US states, including New York).

Baldwin had supportive friends – the painter Beauford Delaney and the writer Richard Wright. Wright recognized his talent and, in 1948, helped Baldwin secure a fellowship in support of his work on his first novel, Go Tell it on the Mountain (published in 1953). The fellowship stipend financed his first trip to France, but he gave much of it to his mother because his stepfather had died several years earlier, leaving her with eight younger children.

== Paris ==
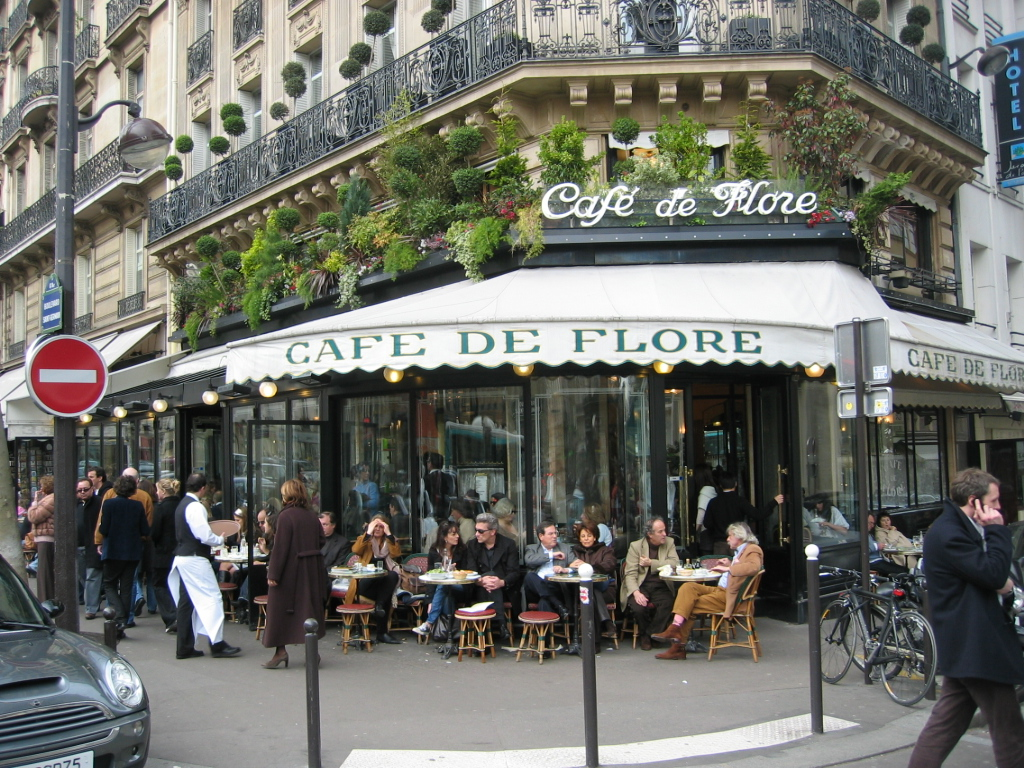
Café de Flore in Saint-Germain-des-Prés, where Baldwin wrote during his Parisian years

Baldwin traveled to Paris, arriving in November 1948 with only 40 dollars in his pocket. He was 24 years old. In his essay 'No Name in the Street', he describes his decision to move to Paris as follows: "I had never, thank God – and certainly not once I found myself living there – been even remotely romantic about Paris... My journey, or my flight, had not been to Paris, but simply away from America."

During the first part of his stay in Paris, Baldwin lived in cheap hotels, mostly in the Saint-Germain-des-Prés district of Paris. There, he joined a significant community of intellectuals and artists, including a number of Black Americans (for example, Josephine Baker and Richard Wright) who were mainly involved in the arts and entertainment. He was also acquainted with several French intellectuals such as Simone de Beauvoir, Albert Camus and Jean-Paul Sartre. Baldwin wrote in the cafés of Saint-Germain-des-Prés, especially the Café de Flore.

Baldwin seems to have found life in Paris congenial. Freed from the anxieties of life as a black, gay man in New York, he appreciated "the arrogant indifference on the part of the Parisian, with its unpredictable effects on the traveler, which makes so splendid the Paris air, to say nothing whatever of the exhilarating effect it has on the Paris scene."

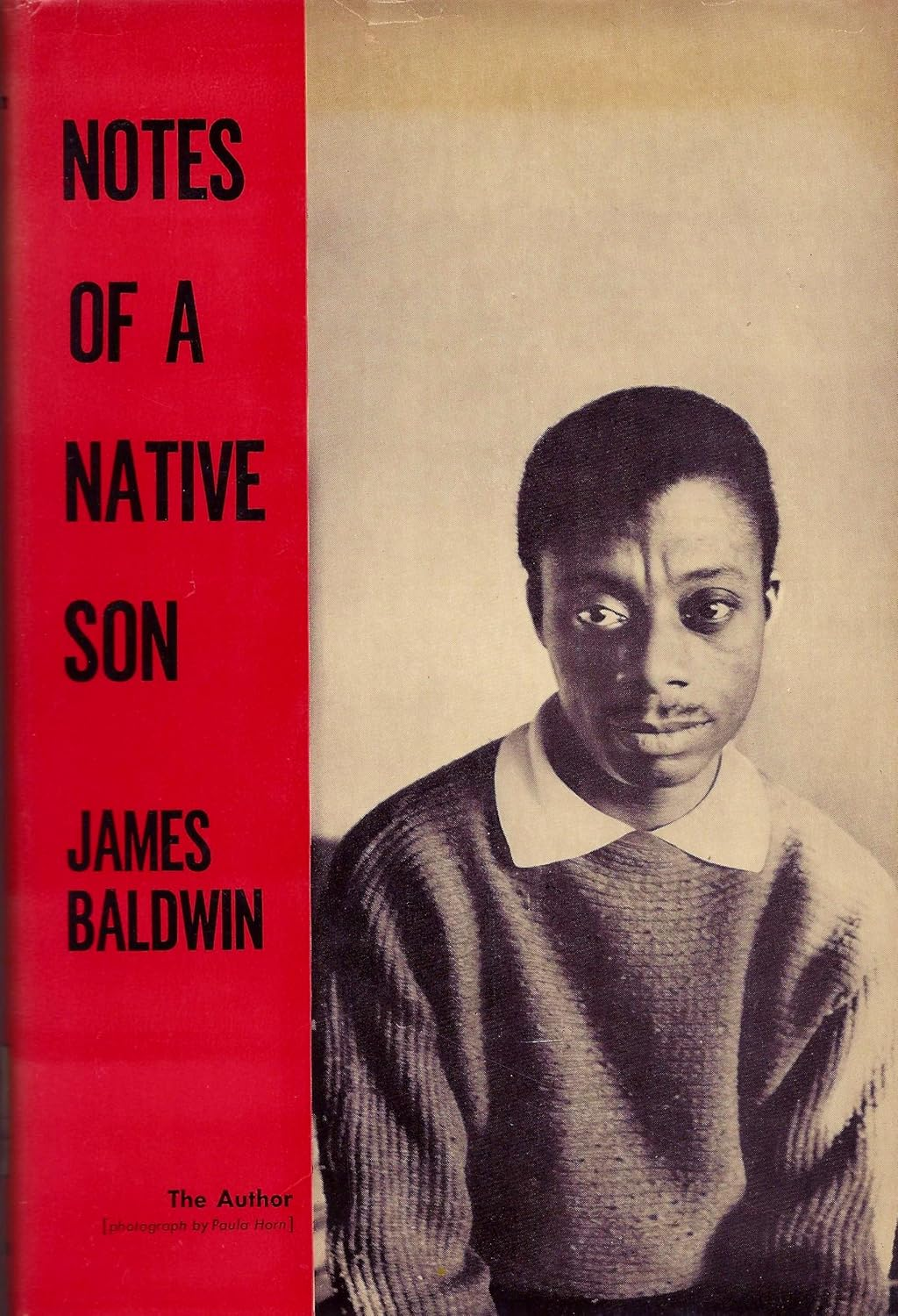
The cover of the first edition of Notes of a Native Son

His stay was not without trouble, however. Early on, he was jailed for having sheets that had been stolen from a hotel room by a friend of his. He spent eight days in jail over Christmas in 1949. His subsequent commentary expresses his view that the French legal system, like the American system, was run by people "who consider themselves to be at a safe remove from all the wretched, for whom the pain of the living is not real." Baldwin described his prison experience in a chapter of Notes of a Native Son (1955). He also had a violent argument with his mentor, Richard Wright, after the publication of his essay "Everybody's Protest Novel" in the French literary magazine Zero. The essay included a scathing critique of Wright's major 1940 novel, Native Son, which led to a permanent estrangement between the two men.

Although perhaps originally motivated by self-preservation, Baldwin quickly found that his exile to France was also a journey of self-discovery: "In America, the color of my skin had stood between myself and me; that barrier was down ... it turned out that the question of who I am was not solved because I had removed myself from the social forces that menaced me — anyway, these forces had become interior and I had dragged them across the ocean with me. The question of who I was had at last become a personal question, and the answer was to be found in me."

Baldwin's time in Paris was fruitful—it was where he wrote a large portion of his first novel, Go Tell It on the Mountain, and also his 1956 bestseller, Giovanni's Room (which draws on his experiences with the gay scene in Paris}, as well as his influential compilation of essays, Notes of a Native Son.

== Saint-Paul-de-Vence ==
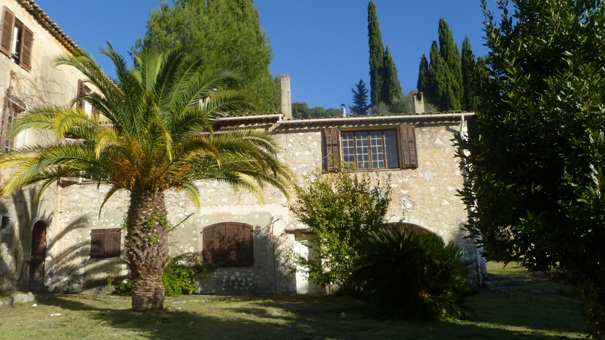
The house in Saint-Paul-de-Vence where Baldwin lived and died

By the 1970s, Baldwin was suffering from ill health, exhaustion and, possibly, alcoholism. With the help of French film star Simone Signoret, Baldwin moved to Saint-Paul-de-Vence in 1971, following a serious bout of depression and illness. He had long-standing problems with depression and tried to commit suicide several times during his life. He initially stayed in hotels in Saint Paul, but later moved to a sprawling 17th-century property, located a short distance from Saint Paul's ramparts. Using funds earned from his writings, Baldwin gradually bought pieces of the property, which had a large garden. Saint-Paul de-Vence became Baldwin's final and only settled home as an adult (although Baldwin himself stated that "home is not a place, but simply an irrecoverable condition").

As was typical for him, Baldwin's social life was active during the years he lived in Saint Paul. Performers at the jazz festivals in nearby Nice and Juan-les-Pins would stay with him (including Josephine Baker, Ray Charles, Miles Davis and Nina Simone). Actor Bill Cosby also visited and, every year for Baldwin's birthday, sent him a bouquet with the same number of roses as his age. Baldwin also befriended French intellectuals and artists who had homes in Saint Paul, among them Yves Montand, Simone Signoret and Marguerite Yourcenar.

Despite Baldwin's hectic socializing, the house provided a place where Baldwin could work, though he referred to the study where he wrote as his "torture chamber". Notable works he wrote in Saint Paul, in full or in part, include Just Above My Head (1979), If Beale Street Could Talk (1974), Harlem Quartet (1987) and "Open Letter to My Sister, Angela Y. Davis" (1970).

On December 1, 1987, Baldwin died at the Saint-Paul house, aged 63.

== World traveler and "transatlantic commuter" ==
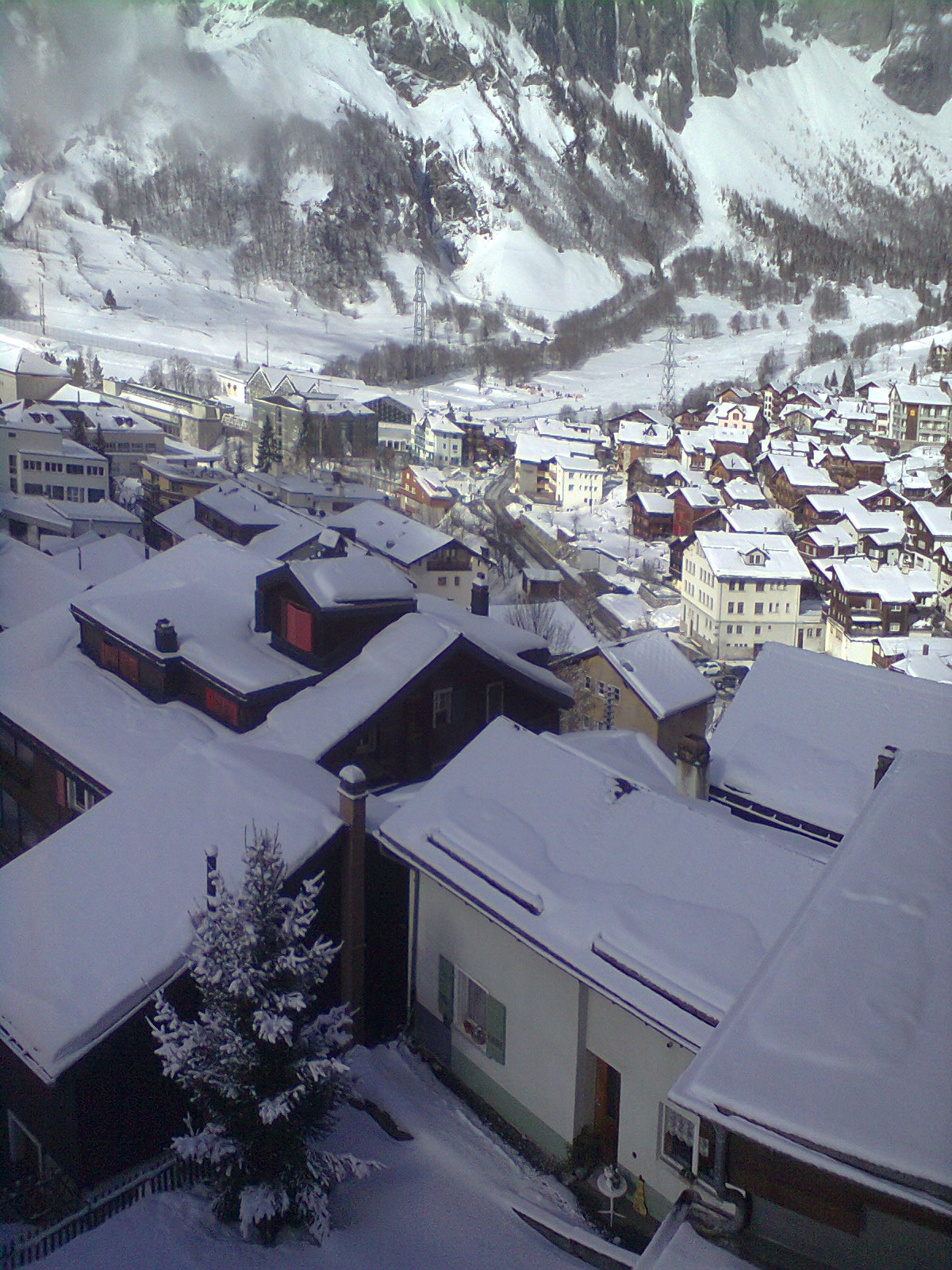
Loèche-les-Bains, where Baldwin completed Go Tell it on the Mountain

Baldwin did not live a settled life in France — he was constantly on the move. Paris and Saint-Paul-de-Vence were his bases of operation, from which he made visits of varying lengths to many countries, as well as many stops in the United States. Some of these stays served the purpose of helping him escape from his many invitations and obligations, both personal and professional.

=== Loèche-les-Bains ===
Switzerland provided the first respite from Baldwin's hectic way of life in France. In the winter of 1951, he stayed for three months in a chalet owned by a friend in the tiny, isolated village of Loèche-les-Bains in the Swiss Alps in order to finish Go Tell it on the Mountain. He reported that he listened to Bessie Smith records while finishing the novel, explaining that her music helped him "to dig back to ... remember the things I had heard and seen and felt." He stayed several more times at his friend's house in Loèche, a village where most of the inhabitants had never seen a black man. One of the chapters of Notes of a Native Son ("Stranger in the Village") describes these stays and draws a parallel between the treatment he received there and his treatment as a black man in the United States.

=== Istanbul ===
Baldwin also made several lengthy visits to Istanbul, Turkey. For the first visit in the summer of 1961, he showed up unannounced at the home of a friend, Engin Cezzar, with whom he had worked in New York. A party was going on, but the exhausted Baldwin soon fell asleep. He had in his suitcase an unfinished manuscript of the novel Another Country, on which he had been working for years. He hoped to complete it during his stay in Istanbul and he succeeded.

For Baldwin, Istanbul was isolated in the sense that it removed him his usual professional and social contacts — he knew few people there and did not speak the Turkish language — so it afforded him a quiet space where he was able to complete his novel in two months. Another Country ends with the note: "Istanbul, Dec. 10, 1961." A history of Baldwin's travels and writings states that he "returned to the city many times during the next ten years, making it a second or third not-quite-home." Istanbul seems to have served mainly as a refuge that provided a congenial context in which he could write; it does not directly feature in any of his fiction, though it could have indirectly influenced some of it.

=== Transatlantic commuting and other travels ===
During his 23-year stay in France, Baldwin frequently returned to the United States in order to conduct business, renew ties with the mother country and support in the Civil Rights movement. In an interview with Studs Terkel, Baldwin states:

I never intended to come back to this country .... (but) I am an American writer. My subject is my country. I had to come back to check my impressions, and, as it turned out, to be stung again, to look at it again, to bear it again, and to be reconciled to it again. Now, I imagine, I will have to spend the rest of my life as a kind of transatlantic commuter."

In addition to Switzerland, Turkey and the United States, Baldwin's travels included trips to England, Puerto Rico, Israel, Senegal and the Soviet Union.

== Role of expatriation in Baldwin's oeuvre ==
Baldwin spent most of his adult life abroad and "it is widely recognised that the Parisian and, more broadly, the European experience was crucial in Baldwin's personal and creative life." His expatriation placed him in a long line of American writers whose stays in Europe had a profound influence on their work (e.g., Ernest Hemingway, Ezra Pound and Gertrude Stein). In the words of the National Museum of African-American History and Culture, "Baldwin's time abroad nurtured his literary focus on the complexities of the human experience". His travels, and especially his decades-long stay in France, provided a vantage point from which to observe his own country, the main subject of his oeuvre. Coles describes America "as a country [Baldwin] insists he never really left, only crossed the ocean to look at more intently." In this respect, Baldwin is frequently compared to James Joyce, who was an expatriate whose major works were exclusively about Ireland.

Baldwin's expatriation helped him see more clearly the interlinked roles of blacks and whites in American society and his own "role" as a black and gay man in this society. As one critic puts it, his stay in Paris "enabled Baldwin to shed what he felt to be his oppressive and imposed 'Negro' identity and embrace a much more emancipated and individuated sense of himself as an American. Intrinsic to this new sense of himself was his realization that he shared an identity and an experience of alienation common to all Americans”. He had not realized how American he was until he stepped into another culture. In Baldwin's own words:

… [expatriation] brought home what it meant to be an American: In my necessity to find the terms on which my experience could be related to that of others, Negroes and Whites, writers and non-writers, I proved, to my astonishment, to be as American as any Texas G.I."

Baldwin's view of the interlinked identities of white and black Americans and their shared American experience (but, an experience seen through two different lenses) explains why he felt comfortable writing novels that had few, if any, black characters (such as Giovanni's Room) and why he did not wish to be thought of as what was euphemistically referred to as a "Negro writer". In an analysis of Giovanni's Room (which has no black, but many gay characters, and which draws on Baldwin's experience of gay life in Paris), a critic states: "expatriation freed Baldwin to interrogate the complexities of his own identify as a writer, as an American, and as a homosexual, outside the sexually and politically repressive climate of postwar America." In the words of another critic:

This search for self identity led toward new insights into ... how his own national identity expressed a 'hybrid' cultural history, and how the social role of a writer must move from isolation back to a public identity and public interventions. All these themes in Baldwin's Parisian work expressed his creative response to expatriate experiences, but they also lead to some of the most influential theories in our own era's intellectual culture.
