= Schubert M. Ogden =

American Protestant theologian (1928–2019)

Schubert Miles Ogden
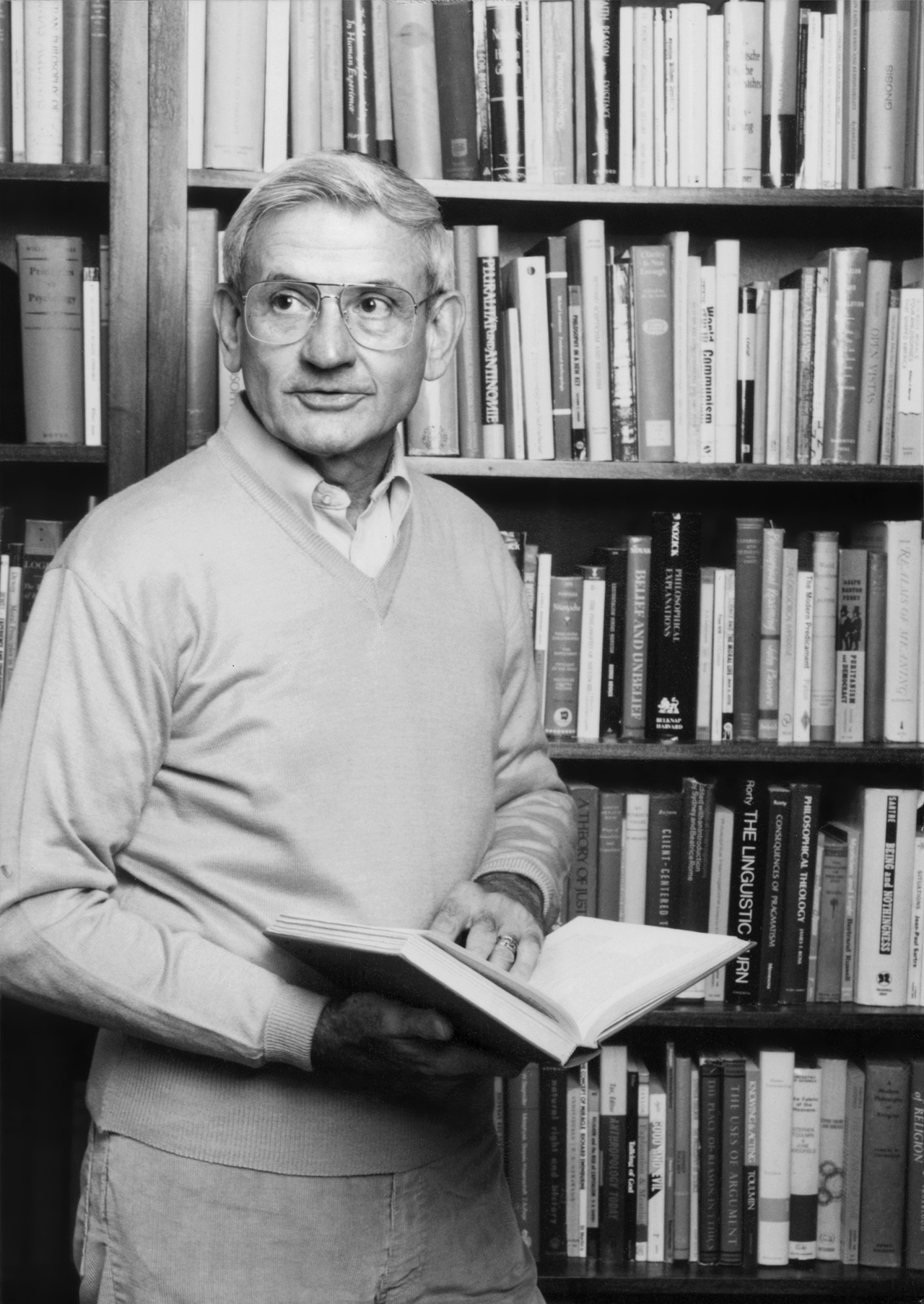
- Born: March 2, 1928; Cincinnati, Ohio, U.S.
- Died: June 6, 2019 (aged 91); Louisville, Colorado, U.S.
- Occupation: Professor
- Spouse: Joyce Ogden
- Children: 2
- Awards: John Simon Guggenheim Fellowship, Fellow of the American Academy of Arts and Sciences

Academic background
- Education: Ohio Wesleyan, Johns Hopkins
- Alma mater: University of Chicago, Divinity School
- Thesis: Christ without Myth: A Study Based on the Theology of Rudolf Bultmann
- Influences: Charles Hartshorne, Rudolf Bultmann

Academic work
- Discipline: Christian systematic theology
- Institutions: Perkins School of Theology at Southern Methodist University; University of Chicago
- Notable works: The Reality of God; The Understanding of Christian Faith; The Point of Christology

Schubert Miles Ogden (March 2, 1928 – June 6, 2019) was an American Protestant theologian who proposed an interpretation of the Christian faith that he believed was both appropriate to the earliest apostolic witness found in the New Testament and also credible in the light of common human experience. He wrote 11 books and was awarded many honors including the John Simon Guggenheim Fellowship, a Fulbright research scholarship, as well as honorary degrees from Ohio Wesleyan University, the University of Chicago, and Southern Methodist University. He gave many titled lectureships in universities in Europe and the United States, was made President of the American Academy of Religion (1976–1977), and was elected a Fellow of the American Academy of Arts and Sciences (1985).

== Life and career ==
Ogden was born in 1928 in Cincinnati, Ohio, where he graduated from high school in 1946. He then attended Ohio Wesleyan University where he met his future wife Joyce Ellen Schwettman. He then studied philosophy for a year at Johns Hopkins before enrolling in the Divinity School of the University of Chicago where he earned both his BD and PhD. It was at the University of Chicago that he became concerned with the viewpoints of two major scholars who would influence his own theology: the philosophy of Charles Hartshorne, a metaphysician with whom Ogden studied, and the theology of Rudolf Bultmann, the German New Testament scholar whose project was "demythologizing" the New Testament; that is, interpreting the mythical elements of the New Testament in terms of existentialist philosophy. Ogden's dissertation, published as Christ without Myth, was a critical but positive engagement with the thought of Rudolf Bultmann, an engagement about which one reviewer of Ogden has written: "Although it has been deepened and refined...Ogden’s basic understanding of the contemporary theological task has not changed since the expression given to it in his early appreciation of Bultmann’s contribution." It was in 1962–63 while in Marburg that Ogden's professional relationship to Bultmann developed into a personal one that was sustained by an extensive correspondence until Bultmann's death in 1976.

Ogden was invited to Perkins School of Theology at Southern Methodist University in 1956 and served on its faculty for thirteen years. His two sons, Alan Scott and Andrew Merrick, were born in Dallas. In 1969 he left SMU to become University Professor of Theology at the Divinity School of the University of Chicago, only to return to Perkins in 1972 for an additional twenty-one years of teaching. He retired in 1993 as University Distinguished Professor of Theology. Ogden died June 6, 2019, in Louisville, Colorado following a lengthy illness.

== Theology ==
Ogden has written that from the beginning of his career he has understood himself to be a Christian theologian. However, unlike most traditional Christian theologians, he has viewed the task of theology to be not an endorsement of traditional Christian doctrine but rather a critical reflection on the Christian witness. This means to inquire, first, whether any subsequent Christian witness is appropriate to the earliest apostolic message about Christ, and, second, whether the Christian witness is credible in the light of common human experience. The former task involves not only establishing what is the normative Christian witness that Jesus is the Christ but how that witness is to be interpreted, a task that involves both historical and interpretative issues concerning the New Testament. The second task necessarily involves philosophy because the credibility of the Christian witness can only be established in purely secular terms. The result of the large literature Ogden has produced that is dedicated to carrying out these two tasks has led one reviewer to write: "Probably no theologian since Schleiermacher has provided a more nuanced and cogent account of Christian theology’s constitution as a complex, yet integral field of critical reflection...."

=== Existentialist Anthropology ===
Ogden's view of the task of theology rests on an analysis of our common human experience as having two inseparable dimensions: our empirical experience of ourselves and others, but also and more deeply, our existential experience, with its threefold certainty that we exist as subjects of our experience, that we exist together with others like ourselves on which we are mutually dependent, and that all of us exist as parts of the all-inclusive whole—the one circumambient reality on which we all depend absolutely and which, in its way, relatively, depends on all of us. It is out of these certainties that the religions arise. Religions are the cultural systems that provide the concepts and symbols through which a given human community explicitly asks and answers the existential question: what is the meaning of ultimate reality for us? These religions basically presuppose that there is an authentic self-understanding or way persons view themselves in relation to the world that is normative, and that it is so because it is authorized by ultimate reality itself.

Ogden writes that Christian faith is an answer to this existential question concerning the meaning of ultimate reality for us. What distinguishes Christian faith is that it believes that the most authentic self-understanding is decisively revealed through Jesus. By "authentic self-understanding" is meant a transformation of the self in which we are inwardly liberated for others and ourselves by trust in and loyalty to the whole within which we exist.

=== Criterion of Appropriateness ===
With respect to the appropriateness of traditional Christian witness, Ogden's theology is distinguished from most forms of orthodox or liberal theology in holding that the primary authority for the Christian witness is the earliest apostolic witness discovered in the New Testament. What historical-critical scholarship shows is that this earliest apostolic proclamation was not that Jesus was the Incarnation of God or that his empirical-historical life and teaching somehow symbolize the timeless truth of ethical monotheism, but rather that he himself, simply as a person or event, is "the decisive revelation of God and the primal authorizing source of all that is appropriately Christian." This so-called Jesus-kerygma thus proclaims Jesus as "God’s own call to decision ... by representing [him] as the proclaimer of God’s imminent reign or rule." What this means is that "whatever may or may not have been the case with the empirical-historical Jesus," the Jesus-kerygma proclaims that God's love "is decisively re-presented as the gift and demand that authorizes us to exist in obedient faith in God and in love both for God and for all whom God loves."

Ogden's insistence on saying that, for normative Christian witness, Jesus represents God's love entails rejecting all christological views in which the coming of Jesus is said to constitute the only possibility of achieving salvation. Such views all assume that original sin made salvation impossible before Christ's coming. But in Ogden's view, the event of Jesus Christ only decisively re-presents the possibility of salvation by manifesting what has been true all along: that God is nothing but boundless love, and that deciding for an authentic self-understanding, and therefore salvation, has always been a possibility. This entails, in turn, that decision for such an authentic human existence could possibly occur otherwise than through the Christian religion and its special means of salvation.

=== Criterion of Credibility ===
With respect to the credibility of Christian witness, Ogden's theology is distinguished from most forms of orthodox or liberal theology since he asserts that whether the Christian faith is credible can be established only by means of philosophical inquiry. He undertakes such inquiry by doing what he calls "transcendental metaphysics." He argues that it is a fundamental existential presupposition of all human beings that life is ultimately worth living and that it is impossible to deny coherently what is thus necessarily implied by any self-understanding at all. Pursuit of such transcendental metaphysical reflection, then, yields the notion of a universal individual upon which we are absolutely dependent and which is also relatively dependent upon us. "God" is the name for this one and only universal individual, "whose field of interacting with others is utterly unrestricted. This implies ... that nothing ... either is or could be outside God’s love or merely alongside God, for ... God’s very essence is love."

Both Ogden's critical analysis of the original Christian witness and his philosophical arguments concluding that the Christian faith is credible led him to reject most traditional formulations of Christian faith in God as well as of the usual positions taken against it. God is not a separate personal being who existed before the creation of the world but the one all-encompassing strictly universal individual whose essence, in symbolic terms, is nothing other than the pure, unbounded love that Jesus decisively represents.

== Bibliography ==
=== References About Schubert Ogden ===
- Shook, John R. (2005). Dictionary of American Philosophers. Bloomsbury Publishing. p. 1840f.
- Musser, Donald (1996). A New Handbook of Christian Theologians. Abingdon Press.

=== Books by Schubert Ogden ===
- Ogden, Schubert (1961). Christ without Myth: A Study Based on the Theology of Rudolf Bultmann. New York, London: Harper & Brothers, Collins.
  Reprinted in 1979 and 1991 by Southern Methodist University Press, Dallas, TX.
- Ogden, Schubert (1966). The Reality of God and Other Essays. New York, London: Harper & Row, SCM Press.
  Reprinted in 1992 by Dallas, TX: Southern Methodist University Press
  German translation by Käthe Gregor Smith as Die Realität Gottes. Zürich: Zwingli Verlag, 1970
- Ogden, Schubert; Hartshorne, Charles (1967). Theology in Crisis: A Colloquium on the Credibility of "God". New Concord, OH: Muskingum College.
- Ogden, Schubert (1979). Faith and Freedom: Toward a Theology of Liberation. Nashville, Belfast TN: Abingdon, Christian Journals.
  second revised and enlarged edition: Nashville, TN: Abingdon, 1989;
  Reprinted Eugene, OR: Wipf & Stock, 2005
- Ogden, Schubert (1982). The Point of Christology. San Francisco, London: Harper & Row, SCM Press.
  Reprinted Dallas, TX: Southern Methodist University Press, 1992
- Ogden, Schubert (1986). On Theology. San Francisco: Harper & Row.
  Reprinted Dallas, TX: Southern Methodist University Press, 1992
- Ogden, Schubert (1992). Is There Only One True Religion or Are There Many?. Dallas, TX: Southern Methodist University Press.
- Ogden, Schubert (1996). Doing Theology Today. Valley Forge, PA: Trinity Press International.
  Reprinted Eugene, OR: Wipf & Stock, 2006
- Ogden, Schubert (2010). The Understanding of Christian Faith. Eugene, OR: Cascade Books.
  German translation by Regine Kather as Den christlichen Glauben verstehen. Göttingen: Vandenhoeck & Ruprecht, 2014
- Ogden, Schubert (2015). To Preach the Truth: Selected Sermons and Homilies. Eugene, OR: Cascade Books.
- Ogden, Schubert (2015). To Teach the Truth: Selected Courses and Seminars. Eugene, OR: Cascade Books.

=== Journal articles by Schubert Ogden ===
- Ogden, Schubert M. "The Authority of Scripture for Theology." Interpretation 30.3 (1976): 242–261.
- Ogden, Schubert M. "What Sense Does It Make to Say," God Acts in History"?." The Journal of Religion 43.1 (1963): 1–19.
