= Mary Ely Lyman =

American professor of religion

The Reverend Mary Ely Lyman
- Born: Mary Ely; 1887
- Died: 1975 (aged 87–88); Claremont, California, US
- Occupation: Professor

Academic background
- Education: Mount Holyoke College, Union Theological Seminary (New York City), University of Cambridge

Academic work
- Institutions: University of Chicago, Vassar College, Barnard College, Union Theological Seminary (New York City)

Mary Ely Lyman (1887 – 1975) was an American professor of religion.

== Life ==
Her education was notable because of the discrimination she suffered due to her gender. She attended Mount Holyoke College which she found empowering and she briefly went into teaching before returning to the college to run the YWCA. By 1919 she had a B.D. from the Union Seminary where she deepened her interest in teaching the bible which she had started whilst at the YWCA. She was not allowed to sit with the other graduates because she was the only woman and she was obliged to sit with the wives.

She had the highest marks at the seminary and she was awarded a traveling fellowship. She used this to allow her to study at Cambridge University in the UK. It was only later that she found that although Cambridge allowed women to study it refused to give her a degree or to formally acknowledge her studies. Luckily she received letters of recommendation from her Cambridge tutors and that enable her to enroll for her doctorate. After she qualified in 1924 she was one of two women who were the first to teach at the University of Chicago. She was already a Professor of Religion at Vassar College where her teaching had resulted in that title in 1923.

In 1926 she married Professor Eugene Lyman. She was his second wife and she became a step mother to his two children. She stopped being the professor at Vassar and began to teach religion at Barnard College and the bible at the Union Seminary in 1927. She held both of these positions until 1940 when she decided to join her husband when he retired. In 1958 she had a public disagreement with Billy Graham concerning his interpretation of the bible.

Lyman died in Claremont in 1975.
