= Josep M. Armengol =

Spanish literary scholar and researcher (born 1977)

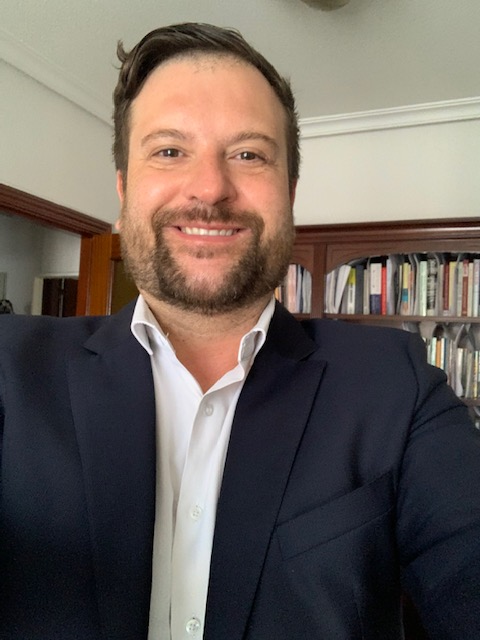
- Born: 4 July 1977 (age 47); Barcelona
- Occupation(s): Literary scholar and researcher
- Works: Debating Masculinity, Alternative Masculinities for a Changing World, Masculinities and Literary Studies
- Movement: Gender studies and masculinities

Josep María Armengol Carrera (Barcelona, 4 July 1977) is a Spanish literary scholar and researcher in the field of gender and masculinity studies.

== Career ==
BA and PhD in English from the University of Barcelona (2006), having authored the first doctoral thesis in Spain on cultural and literary representations of masculinity. In 2007 he moved to the Center for the Study of Men and Masculinities at Stony Brook University, USA, where he carried out his postdoctoral research together with Dr. Michael Kimmel.

Subsequently, he moved to the Universidad de Castilla-La Mancha, working as of 2012 as Associate Professor (accredited as Full Professor in 2018) in gender studies and American literature.

As part of his work on literary representations of African-American masculinities, he argued the centrality of race to James Baldwin's Giovanni’s Room, which had been traditionally studied as a book on homosexuality rather than ethnicity.

Besides being a postdoctoral fellow of the Fulbright-SAAS program in the USA (2016), in 2018 he became the Principal Investigator of the MASCAGE project, focused on representations of masculinity and aging in contemporary European literatures and cinemas, and funded by the Gendernet-Plus Era-Net Co-fund program of the European Union.

Armengol is also Editor of the international journal Men and Masculinities as well as the "Masculinity Studies" series Editor at Peter Lang publishing. He is also cited as one of the fundamental experts in the study of "Hegemonic Masculinity" and "alternative" masculinities. His research has been published in international journals such as Signs, Journal of Gender Studies, Men and Masculinities and MELUS, among others. He is a member of the Global Young Academy as of 2020.

== Works ==
In addition to editing volumes such as Debating Masculinity (2008), Alternative Masculinities for a Changing World (2014) and Masculinities and Literary Studies (2017), he is the author of the monographs Richard Ford and the Fiction of Masculinities, the winner of the “Enrique García Díez” Literary Research Award (Spanish Association for Anglo-American Studies, 2010) and Masculinities in Black and White, the recipient of the Javier Coy Research Award. (Spanish Association for American Studies, 2014).

== Books ==
- Armengol, Josep M. Gendering Men: Theorizing Masculinities in American Culture and Literature. Doctoral dissertation, Universitat de Barcelona. Departament de Filologia Anglesa i Alemanya, 2006.
- Armengol, Josep M. Richard Ford and the Fiction of Masculinities. New York: Peter Lang, 2010.
- Armengol, Josep M., ed. Men in Color: Racialized Masculinities in U.S. Literature and Cinema. Newcastle: Cambridge Scholars, 2011.
- Armengol, Josep M., ed. Queering Iberia: Iberian Masculinities at the Margins. New York: Peter Lang, 2013.
- Armengol, Josep M. Masculinities in Black and White Manliness and Whiteness in (African) American Literature. Basingstoke: Palgrave Macmillan, 2014.
- Armengol, Josep M., and Àngels Carabí, eds. Alternative Masculinities for a Changing World. New York: Palgrave Macmillan, 2014.
- Armengol, Josep M et al., eds. Masculinities and Literary Studies: Intersections and New Directions. New York: Routledge, 2017.
