= Nathan A. Scott Jr. =

Nathan A. Scott Jr. (24 April 1925 – December 2006) was an American scholar who helped establish the modern field of theology and literature and who helped found the well-known Ph.D. program in that field at the University of Chicago. Scott also published seventeen books, in addition to publishing articles and reviews and editing editions. He has likewise been the subject of numerous articles and books.

Scott's innovation in literary criticism was to reject the New Critics' idea that poems should be studied as autonomous objects and to remind scholars that authors' personal beliefs are crucial for understanding their texts; in this way, he also returned criticism to a study of the way literature represents the outside world.

Scott earned his B.A. at the University of Michigan in 1944, his B.D. at Union Theological Seminary in 1946, and his Ph.D. at Columbia University in 1949, having studied under Lionel Trilling, Reinhold Niebuhr, and Jacques Barzun. He served as dean of the chapel at Virginia Union University and was an ordained priest in the Episcopal Church. He taught at Howard University in Washington, D.C. He taught at Chicago from 1955 to 1977, when he moved to University of Virginia. He also served as a President of the American Academy of Religion.

== Partial bibliography ==
- Rehearsals of Discomposure. Alienation and Reconciliation in Modern Literature. New York: King's Crown Press of Columbia University Press. 1952.
- The Broken Center. Studies in the Theological Horizon of Modern Literature. New Haven, Connecticut: Yale University Press. 1966.
- Negative Capability. Studies in the New Literature and the Religious Situation. New Haven, Connecticut: Yale University Press. 1969. ISBN 9780300011067.
- The Poetics of Belief: Studies in Coleridge, Arnold, Pater, Santayana, Stevens, and Heidegger. Chapel Hill: University of North Carolina Press. 1985.
- The Climate of Faith in Modern Literature. New York: The Seabury Press. 1964. (editor)
