= Maria Antonia Armengol =

Spanish politician (born 1950)

María Antonia de Armengol Criado (Valencian: Maria Antònia; born 22 September 1950, in Paris, France) is a Spanish politician who is a member of the Spanish Socialist Workers' Party (PSOE).

Armengol qualified as a lawyer and entered politics in 1983, when she was elected as a PSOE deputy to the Cortes Valencianas, the Valencian regional parliament, serving until 2003.

In 2004, she was elected to the Congress of Deputies as a deputy for Valencia region but did not stand for re-election in 2008. She has also served as a member of the federal committee of the PSOE, and as a member of Greenpeace.
