= List of The Daily Show episodes (2019) =

- No. of episodes: 159

Release
- Original network: Comedy Central
- Original release: January 7 – December 19, 2019

Season chronology
- ← Previous; 2018 episodes Next → 2020 episodes

This is a list of episodes for The Daily Show with Trevor Noah in 2019.

== 2019 ==
=== January ===
No.	Original air date	Guest(s)	Promotion	US viewers (millions)
3194	January 7	Malala Yousafzai	Yousafzai, Malala (8 January 2019). We Are Displaced: My Journey and Stories from Refugee Girls Around the World. Little, Brown Books for Young Readers. ISBN 978-0316523646.	0.710
Michael Kosta suits up for the government shutdown, Roy Wood Jr. examines R. Kelly's surge in popularity, and Malala Yousafzai discusses We Are Displaced and Malala Fund.
3195	January 8	Marc Mauer	Mauer, Marc; Nellis, Ashley (2018). The Meaning of Life: The Case for Abolishing Life Sentences. New Press. ISBN 978-1620974094.	0.821
President Trump flirts with declaring a state of emergency, Michael Kosta investigates a gun festival in Switzerland, and Marc Mauer discusses his book The Meaning of Life.
3196	January 9	Barry Jenkins	If Beale Street Could Talk	0.770
President Trump delivers a fearmongering Oval Office address, Desi Lydic reacts to Jeff Bezos's impending divorce, and Barry Jenkins discusses If Beale Street Could Talk.
3197	January 10	John David Washington	BlacKkKlansman	0.731
The government shutdown over President Trump's border wall takes its toll, Trevor weighs in on a casting controversy, and John David Washington discusses BlacKkKlansman.
3198	January 14	Derek Waters	Drunk History	0.900
Trevor highlights three Democrats running for president in 2020, President Trump's dubious grasp of Civil War history is dramatized, and Derek Waters discusses Drunk History.
3199	January 15	Tressie McMillan Cottom	Cottom, Tressie Mcmillan (2019). Thick: And Other Essays. New Press. ISBN 978-1620974360.	0.675
Trevor investigates the racist rhetoric of Rep. Steve King, Ronny Chieng weighs in on the 2019 Consumer Electronics Show, and author Tressie McMillan Cottom discusses "Thick."
3200	January 16	Keegan-Michael Key	Friends from College	0.802
Nancy Pelosi calls on President Trump to postpone his State of the Union address, Lewis Black targets new state laws, and Keegan-Michael Key discusses Friends from College.
3201	January 17	Don Cheadle	Black Monday	0.853
Michael Kosta sees crowdfunding as a solution to the government shutdown, Jaboukie Young-White tries out a Trump-inspired credit card, and Don Cheadle talks Black Monday.
3202	January 21	Patty Jenkins	I Am The Night	0.704
A teen’s standoff with Native American leaders goes viral, Dulcé Sloan reflects on Martin Luther King’s legacy, and I Am The Night director Patty Jenkins stops by.
3203	January 22	Amanda Seales	I Be Knowin'	0.696
Democratic Presidential hopefuls address their controversial pasts, Ronny Chieng calls out an Oscar snub, and Amanda Seals discusses her stand-up special I Be Knowin'.
3204	January 23	Joe Morton	God Friended Me	0.825
Nancy Pelosi asks President Trump to postpone the State of the Union, Roy Wood Jr. investigates black cowboys taking on gang violence, and Joe Morton talks God Friended Me.
3205	January 24	Chuck Todd	Meet the Press	0.767
El Chapo's former associates tell all in court, Roy Wood Jr. explains why the NFL should rely on instant replay, and Meet the Press moderator Chuck Todd stops by.
3206	January 28	Mo Amer	The Vagabond	0.766
The government reopens after the longest shutdown in history, Trump aide Roger Stone gets indicted in the Robert Mueller investigation, and Mo Amer discusses The Vagabond.
3207	January 29	Sallie Krawcheck	Ellevate Network	0.687
Howard Schultz announces a possible presidential run, Desi Lydic finds out how environmental racism is affecting a Colorado school, and Ellevest CEO Sallie Krawcheck stops by.
3208	January 30	Chris Christie	Clarkson, Jeremy (October 2018). Let Me Finish. Penguin Books, Limited. ISBN 978-0241366745.	0.878
Ronny Chieng explains climate change as a cold front hits the Midwest, President Trump attacks his own intelligence agencies, and Chris Christie chats about Let Me Finish.
3209	January 31	Ilhan Omar	N/A	0.655
Roy Wood Jr. and Michael Kosta prepare for the big game, Neal Brennan calls for gun control-inspired social media regulations, and Minnesota Rep. Ilhan Omar stops by.

=== February ===
No.	Original air date	Guest(s)	Promotion	US viewers (millions)
3210	February 4	Colin Quinn	Red State Blue State	0.762
Virginia Gov. Ralph Northam comes under fire for allegedly appearing in blackface, President Trump defends his plans for Syria, and Colin Quinn talks Red State Blue State.
3211	February 5	Frank Bruni	N/A	0.766
"State of Union 2019: Uncancelled"; Trevor and the World's Fakest News Team break down President Trump’s second State of the Union address, and New York Times op-ed columnist Frank Bruni weighs in on the speech. Note: this episode was broadcast live. The show was previously announced to air the State of the Union Live on January 29, but was moved to a week later due to the government still being shut down at the time.
3212	February 6	Danai Gurira	The Walking Dead	0.852
Democrats tease their potential 2020 presidential campaigns, Michael Kosta investigates competitive video gaming, and actor Danai Gurira discusses The Walking Dead.
3213	February 7	Dorothy Butler Gilliam	Gilliam, Dorothy Butler (8 January 2019). Trailblazer: A Pioneering Journalist's Fight to Make the Media Look More Like America. Center Street. ISBN 978-1546083443.	0.666
Ronny Chieng talks about raising taxes on the rich, Roy Wood Jr. highlights notable civil rights marches, and journalist Dorothy Butler Gilliam discusses Trailblazer.
3214	February 11	Phoebe Robinson	2 Dope Queens	0.763
Virginia Gov. Ralph Northam addresses his blackface scandal in a CBS interview, Sen. Amy Klobuchar enters the 2020 race, and actor Phoebe Robinson discusses 2 Dope Queens.
3215	February 12	Spike Lee	BlacKkKlansman	0.635
President Trump holds a rally in El Paso, Texas, notorious drug lord Pablo Escobar's hippos take over Colombia, and writer and director Spike Lee discusses BlacKkKlansman.
3216	February 13	RaMell Ross	Hale County This Morning, This Evening	0.727
Alexandria Ocasio-Cortez's Green New Deal sparks outrage, Bricky the Border Wall heads to Texas, and director RaMell Ross talks Hale County This Morning, This Evening.
3217	February 14	Chris Wilson	Wilson, Chris; Witter, Bret (5 February 2019). The Master Plan: My Journey from Life in Prison to a Life of Purpose. Penguin. ISBN 978-0735215580.	0.651
Trevor reflects on the one-year anniversary of the Parkland shooting, Roy Wood Jr. looks back at black contributions to music, and author Chris Wilson talks The Master Plan.
3218	February 18	Bing Liu	Minding the Gap	0.738
Surprising details emerge about Jussie Smollett's alleged attack, President Trump declares a national emergency, and director Bing Liu discusses Minding the Gap.
3219	February 19	Enes Kanter	N/A	0.772
Senator Bernie Sanders joins the 2020 presidential race, Jaboukie Young-White weighs in on Jussie Smollett's alleged attack, and Trevor sits down with NBA star Enes Kanter.
3220	February 20	Kamala Harris	Kamala Harris 2020 presidential campaign	0.803
President Trump is accused of meddling in the Michael Cohen investigation, Trevor examines America's opioid crisis, and Senator Kamala Harris discusses her presidential campaign.
3221	February 21	Chris Kelly & Sarah Schneider	The Other Two	0.647
Jussie Smollett faces a felony charge, Roy Wood Jr. explores the history of enemies recruiting black Americans, and Chris Kelly and Sarah Schneider discuss The Other Two.
3222	February 25	Chiwetel Ejiofor	The Boy Who Harnessed the Wind	0.790
Singer R. Kelly faces jail time for sexual abuse, Roy Wood Jr. meets pre-teen political commentators, and director Chiwetel Ejiofor discusses The Boy Who Harnessed the Wind.
3223	February 26	John Legend	The Voice	0.748
President Trump meets with Kim Jong-un in Vietnam, two women who left their home countries to join ISIS fight to return, and John Legend talks about The Voice and performs "Preach".
3224	February 27	Angie Thomas	Thomas, Angie (5 February 2019). On the Come Up. HarperCollins. ISBN 978-0062498564.	0.871
Michael Cohen goes before Congress to call Donald Trump racist and corrupt, Lewis Black criticizes anti-vaxxers, and Angie Thomas discusses her book On the Come Up.
3225	February 28	Gary Clark Jr.	This Land	0.684
Donald Trump and Kim Jong-un's nuclear summit breaks down, Roy Wood Jr. examines the history of the "magical negro" in cinema, and musician Gary Clark Jr. stops by.

=== March ===
No.	Original air date	Guest(s)	Promotion	US viewers (millions)
3226	March 11	Rutger Bregman	Bregman, Rutger (23 April 2019). Utopia for Realists. Rowohlt Taschenbuch Verlag. ISBN 978-3499633003.	0.900
Beto O'Rourke remains coy about running for president in 2020, President Trump refers to Tim Cook as "Tim Apple," and author Rutger Bregman discusses Utopia for Realists.
3227	March 12	Padma Lakshmi	Top Chef	0.745
Dozens are charged in a college admissions bribery scheme, Desi Lydic honors villainous women, and Top Chef host and executive producer Padma Lakshmi sits down with Trevor.
3228	March 13	Karamo Brown	Brown, Karamo (5 March 2019). Karamo: My Story of Embracing Purpose, Healing, and Hope. Gallery Books. ISBN 978-1982111977. & Queer Eye	0.812
Michael Kosta gives his take on the college admissions bribery scandal, Desi Lydic channels a composer for network news, and Karamo Brown discusses Karamo and Queer Eye.
3229	March 14	Jacob Tobia	Tobia, Jacob (2019). Sissy: A Coming-of-Gender Story. Penguin. ISBN 978-0735218826.	0.675
Ronny Chieng talks about universal income with 2020 presidential candidate Andrew Yang, Dulce Sloan reacts to bizarre police initiatives, and Jacob Tobia discusses Sissy.
3230	March 18	Jay Inslee	Jay Inslee 2020 presidential campaign	0.824
Trevor gives an update on Democratic presidential contenders, Ronny Chieng highlights environmental news, and Washington Gov. Jay Inslee discusses his 2020 White House bid.
3231	March 19	Will Packer	The Atlanta Child Murders	0.840
Trevor highlights Boeing's outsized power over the FAA, Neal Brennan examines socialism's rising popularity in America, and Will Packer discusses The Atlanta Child Murders.
3232	March 20	Will Hurd	N/A	0.780
President Trump lashes out at both the late John McCain and George Conway, Desi Lydic celebrates women's innovations, and Texas Congressman Will Hurd sits down with Trevor.
3233	March 21	Leana Wen	Planned Parenthood	0.670
Michael Kosta argues in favor of reparations, Roy Wood Jr. and Ronny Chieng cover sports news, and Planned Parenthood President Dr. Leana Wen discusses reproductive rights.
3234	March 25	Ilana Glazer & Abbi Jacobson	Broad City	0.768
Trevor and Roy Wood Jr. react to Robert Mueller's report clearing President Trump of Russian collusion, and Abbi Jacobson and Ilana Glazer reflect on the end of Broad City.
3235	March 26	Logic	Hall, Bobby (26 March 2019). Supermarket. Simon & Schuster. ISBN 978-1982127138.	0.704
Democrats demand the release of the Mueller Report, Trevor gives a rundown of high-profile screwups, and Bobby Hall (a.k.a. Logic) discusses his debut novel Supermarket.
3236	March 27	Jennifer Eberhardt	Eberhardt, Jennifer L. (2019). Biased: Uncovering the Hidden Prejudice That Shapes What We See, Think, and Do. Penguin. ISBN 978-0735224933.	0.795
Trevor profiles 2020 presidential hopeful Pete Buttigieg, Michael Kosta reacts to cruel proposals from the Trump administration, and Jennifer L. Eberhardt discusses Biased.
3237	March 28	Lupita Nyong'o	Us	0.638
Trevor examines the phenomenon of snowplow parenting, Desi Lydic investigates gender price discrimination, and Lupita Nyong'o discusses her dual role in the movie Us.

=== April ===
No.	Original air date	Guest(s)	Promotion	US viewers (millions)
3238	April 1	Hakeem Jeffries	N/A	0.832
Joe Biden is accused of inappropriate behavior toward women, President Trump cuts off aid to Central American countries, and New York Rep. Hakeem Jeffries chats with Trevor.
3239	April 2	Marsai Martin	Little	0.700
A whistleblower sounds the alarm about security clearances in the Trump administration, spring break spirals out of control in Miami, and Marsai Martin chats about Little.
3240	April 3	PJ Morton	Gumbo Unplugged	0.830
Lori Lightfoot becomes Chicago's first black female mayor, Trevor examines President Trump's bitter hatred of windmills, and PJ Morton discusses his album Gumbo Unplugged.
3241	April 4	Bernie Sanders	Bernie Sanders 2020 presidential campaign	0.752
Controversy swirls around William Barr's Mueller report summary, Democrats call for President Trump's tax returns, and Sen. Bernie Sanders discusses his 2020 White House bid.
3242	April 8	David Oyelowo	Les Misérables	0.616
President Trump fires Homeland Security Secretary Kirstjen Nielsen, Trevor profiles Federal Reserve Board nominee Herman Cain, and David Oyelowo discusses Les Misérables.
3243	April 9	Abby Wambach	Wambach, Abby (9 April 2019). Wolfpack: How to Come Together, Unleash Our Power, and Change the Game. Celadon Books. ISBN 978-1250217707.	0.753
Democrats spar with White House officials over President Trump's tax returns, Ronny Chieng reacts to food-based lawsuits in the U.S., and Abby Wambach discusses Wolfpack.
3244	April 10	Oprah Winfrey	Winfrey, Oprah (26 March 2019). The Path Made Clear: Discovering Your Life's Direction and Purpose. Flatiron Books. ISBN 978-1250307507.	0.772
Maxine Waters smacks down Steve Mnuchin, Roy Wood Jr. reacts to Democratic presidential candidates' black voter outreach, and Oprah Winfrey discusses The Path Made Clear.
3245	April 11	Lizzo	Cuz I Love You	0.721
WikiLeaks founder Julian Assange is arrested, Desi Lydic examines the Me Too movement's effects on Wall Street work culture, and Lizzo chats about her album Cuz I Love You.
3246	April 22	Amanda Nguyen	Rise	0.742
The Mueller report describes President Trump in panic mode, Ronny Chieng reacts to proposed climate change solutions, and Nobel Prize nominee Amanda Nguyen discusses Rise.
3247	April 23	Anna Palmer & Jake Sherman	Sherman, Jake; Palmer, Anna (9 April 2019). The Hill to Die On: The Battle for Congress and the Future of Trump's America. Crown. ISBN 978-0525574743.	0.696
CNN hosts town halls for five Democratic presidential contenders, Michael Kosta offers alternatives to impeachment, and Anna Palmer and Jake Sherman talk The Hill to Die On.
3248	April 24	Melinda Gates	Gates, Melinda (23 April 2019). The Moment of Lift: How Empowering Women Changes the World. Flatiron Books. ISBN 978-1250313577.	0.637
Jaboukie Young-White offers Twitter tips to President Trump, Lewis Black rants about New York City's congestion tax, and Melinda Gates discusses her book The Moment of Lift.
3249	April 25	Ryan O’Connell	Special	0.595
Joe Biden officially announces his 2020 presidential bid, Roy Wood Jr. weighs in on black country musicians, and Ryan O'Connell discusses his Netflix series Special.
3250	April 29	Pete Buttigieg	Pete Buttigieg 2020 presidential campaign	0.666
President Trump racks up over 10,000 lies, Roy Wood Jr. tackles Avengers: Endgame spoiler outrage, and 2020 White House hopeful Pete Buttigieg discusses Shortest Way Home.
3251	April 30	Jesse Williams	Grey's Anatomy	0.575
Some 2020 Democratic candidates struggle to be noticed, Dulce Sloan explains Joe Biden's appeal to black female voters, and Jesse Williams discusses his Grey's Anatomy role.

=== May ===
No.	Original air date	Guest(s)	Promotion	US viewers (millions)
3252	May 1	Chelsea Handler	Handler, Chelsea (2019). Life Will Be the Death of Me: . . . and you too!. Random House Publishing. ISBN 978-0525511779.	0.710
Senators grill Attorney General William Barr, Roy Wood Jr. examines humanity's lack of concern over climate change, and Chelsea Handler talks Life Will Be the Death of Me.
3253	May 2	Charlize Theron	Long Shot	0.666
A whale is suspected of spying for Russia, Jordan Klepper talks about his show Klepper, and actor Charlize Theron chats about Long Shot and the Africa Outreach Project.
3254	May 6	Eddie Izzard	Wunderbar Tour	0.590
Trevor wonders about America's next war, Roy Wood Jr. reacts to President Trump's school lunch rollback, and comedian Eddie Izzard chats about his global Wunderbar tour.
3255	May 7	Valerie Jarrett	Jarrett, Valerie (2019). Finding My Voice: My Journey to the West Wing and the Path Forward. Penguin. ISBN 978-0525558132.	0.580
Scientists warn over 1 million species face imminent extinction, Trump officials risk congressional contempt, and Valerie Jarrett discusses her book Finding My Voice.
3256	May 8	Tyra Banks	N/A	0.648
Footage of Bernie Sanders reveals his ideological consistency, Donald Trump lost over a billion dollars in a decade, and Tyra Banks discusses her return to Sports Illustrated.
3257	May 9	Mark Jonathan Harris & Deborah Oppenheimer	Foster	0.518
South Africa's general election heats up, Desi Lydic tackles sexist coverage of the 2020 race, and filmmakers Mark Jonathan Harris and Deborah Oppenheimer discuss Foster.
3258	May 20	Kirsten Gillibrand	Kirsten Gillibrand 2020 presidential campaign	0.632
GOP state lawmakers take aim at Roe v. Wade, Mayor Bill de Blasio announces his White House bid, and Senator Kirsten Gillibrand discusses her 2020 presidential campaign.
3259	May 21	Ava DuVernay	When They See Us	0.760
Democratic presidential hopefuls take varying approaches to Fox News, Michael Kosta talks to a man who helped legalize nunchucks, and Ava DuVernay discusses When They See Us.
3260	May 22	Rachel Louise Snyder	Snyder, Rachel Louise (7 May 2019). No Visible Bruises: What We Don't Know About Domestic Violence Can Kill Us. Bloomsbury USA. ISBN 978-1635570977.	0.740
The U.S. and China race to control 5G, Ronny Chieng talks to New Yorkers about their texting-while-walking habits, and Rachel Louise Snyder discusses No Visible Bruises.
3261	May 23	Wyatt Cenac	Wyatt Cenac's Problem Areas	0.666
President Trump has a major beef with House Speaker Nancy Pelosi, Dulce Sloan weighs in on Ben Carson's job security, and Wyatt Cenac discusses Wyatt Cenac's Problem Areas.
3262	May 28	Reese Witherspoon	Big Little Lies	0.631
President Trump pays a visit to Japan, Roy Wood Jr. accuses Trevor of being an anti-American propagandist, and Reese Witherspoon discusses her HBO series Big Little Lies.
3263	May 29	Jill Biden	Where the Light Enters: Building a Family, Discovering Myself. ISBN 978-1250248541.	0.712
Robert Mueller gives a rare press conference, Ronny Chieng reacts to high-tech Christian outreach initiatives, and Dr. Jill Biden discusses her book Where the Light Enters.
3264	May 30	Christian Siriano	Project Runway	0.572
Top Democrats support impeaching President Trump, Neal Brennan calls on Democrats to be as ruthless as Republicans, and Christian Siriano talks fashion and Project Runway.

=== June ===
No.	Original air date	Guest(s)	Promotion	US viewers (millions)
3265	June 3	Eric Swalwell	Eric Swalwell 2020 presidential campaign	0.736
President Trump pays an official state visit to the U.K., Roy Wood Jr. and Michael Kosta talk sports, and Democratic Rep. Eric Swalwell discusses his 2020 presidential run.
3266	June 4	Amber Scorah	Scorah, Amber (2019). Leaving the Witness: Exiting a Religion and Finding a Life. Penguin. ISBN 978-0735222540.	0.670
President Trump continues his controversial U.K. visit, Jaboukie Young-White talks socialism with Sen. Bernie Sanders, and author Amber Scorah discusses Leaving the Witness.
3267	June 5	Randall Park	Always Be My Maybe	0.675
Trevor highlights U.K. politician Boris Johnson, Lewis Black rails against the CBD craze, and Randall Park chats about his Netflix movie Always Be My Maybe.
3268	June 6	James Corden	73rd Tony Awards	0.675
Trevor examines the life and career of Elizabeth Warren, President Trump's tweets lose their punch, and James Corden discusses The Late Late Show and the 2019 Tony Awards.
3269	June 10	Danielle Brooks	Orange Is the New Black	0.590
Democratic presidential candidates descend on Iowa, President Trump cancels his Mexico tariffs, and actor Danielle Brooks chats about her Shakespeare in the Park experience.
3270	June 11	Kwame Onwuachi	Onwuachi, Kwame; Stein, Joshua David (9 April 2019). Notes from a Young Black Chef: A Memoir. Knopf Doubleday Publishing. ISBN 978-1524732639.	0.598
Vladimir Putin builds an alliance with China's Xi Jinping, Ronny Chieng gets embedded with a plastic straw cop, and Kwame Onwuachi discusses Notes from a Young Black Chef.
3271	June 12	Tessa Thompson	Men in Black: International	0.560
President Trump spars with Joe Biden, Desi Lydic reacts to a Women's World Cup controversy, and actor Tessa Thompson discusses her role in Men in Black: International.
3272	June 13	Tim Ryan	Tim Ryan 2020 presidential campaign	0.578
President Trump signals a willingness to accept foreign dirt on his rivals, Ronny Chieng blasts over-pampered dogs, and Rep. Tim Ryan discusses his 2020 presidential campaign.
3273	June 17	Christine Lagarde	N/A	0.671
A video captures police threatening a family in Phoenix, President Trump sits down with George Stephanopoulos, and managing director of the IMF Christine Lagarde stops by.
3274	June 18	Tom Perez	N/A	0.614
Harvard rejects a Parkland survivor over racist remarks, Jaboukie Young-White examines corporate participation in Pride Month, and DNC Chair Tom Perez sits down with Trevor.
3275	June 19	Arturo Castro	Alternatino with Arturo Castro	0.755
Tensions escalate between the U.S. and Iran, Roy Wood Jr. honors escaped slaves for Juneteenth, and Arturo Castro talks about his sketch series Alternatino with Arturo Castro.
3276	June 20	Lindsey Vonn	N/A	0.599
Joe Biden takes heat for an anecdote about working with segregationists, Iran shoots down a U.S. drone, and former Olympic Alpine skier Lindsey Vonn sits down with Trevor.
3277	June 24	Elaine Welteroth	Welteroth, Elaine (2019). More Than Enough: Claiming Space for Who You Are. Penguin. ISBN 978-0525561583.	0.593
President Trump suddenly reverses course on bombing Iran, a database exposes racist Facebook posts by police, and author Elaine Welteroth discusses More Than Enough.
3278	June 25	Olivia Munn	The Rook	0.676
Bernie Sanders rolls out a plan to cancel student loan debt, Jaboukie Young-White examines a fight for civics education in Rhode Island, and Olivia Munn discusses The Rook.
3279	June 26	Perry Bacon Jr.	N/A	0.741
"World War D: Let’s Get Ready to Ramble – Part I"; Democratic candidates square off in the first 2020 primary debate, The World's Fakest News Team solves a crisis, and FiveThirtyEight senior writer Perry Bacon Jr. stops by. Note: this episode was broadcast live.
3280	June 27	Howard Dean	N/A	0.683
"World War D: Let’s Get Ready to Ramble – Part II"; Sparks fly in 2020's second Democratic debate, Ronny Chieng tests people's knowledge about Democratic presidential candidates, and former DNC chair Howard Dean stops by. Note: this episode was broadcast live.

=== July ===
No.	Original air date	Guest(s)	Promotion	US viewers (millions)
3281	July 15	Dapper Dan	Day, Daniel R.; Awake, Mikael (2019). Dapper Dan: Made in Harlem: A Memoir. Random House Publishing. ISBN 978-0525510512.	0.677
The FBI raids Jeffrey Epstein's New York City mansion, a major blackout rocks Manhattan, and fashion designer Dapper Dan discusses his memoir Dapper Dan: Made in Harlem.
3282	July 16	Nas	The Lost Tapes II	0.607
The House condemns President Trump's racist tweets, Michael Kosta investigates a personhood initiative for Lake Erie, and rapper Nas talks about his album The Lost Tapes II.
3283	July 17	Nelson Makamo	N/A	0.748
Democrats and Republicans spar over President Trump's racist tweets, Michael Kosta reacts to footage of Trump partying with Jeffrey Epstein, and artist Nelson Makamo stops by.
3284	July 18	Isha Sesay	Sesay, Isha (9 July 2019). Beneath the Tamarind Tree: A Story of Courage, Family, and the Lost Schoolgirls of Boko Haram. HarperCollins. ISBN 978-0062686671.	0.605
Rep. Ilhan Omar becomes the target of a racist chant at a Trump rally, Puerto Ricans protest government corruption, and Isha Sesay discusses Beneath the Tamarind Tree.
3285	July 22	Jamie Bell	Skin	0.714
President Trump advocates for rapper A$AP Rocky's release from Swedish jail, Ronny Chieng sounds off about expensive auction items, and actor Jamie Bell discusses Skin.
3286	July 23	David Spade	Lights Out with David Spade	0.619
Asian countries send back garbage exported from the West, Michael Kosta and Roy Wood Jr. cover quirky sports news, and David Spade chats about Lights Out with David Spade.
3287	July 24	Gina Torres	Pearson	0.566
Robert Mueller testifies about his Trump-Russia investigation before Congress, Lewis Black highlights dangers facing beachgoers, and actor Gina Torres discusses Pearson.
3288	July 25	Andrew Yang	Andrew Yang 2020 presidential campaign	0.653
Student debt becomes a major crisis in the U.S., Trevor's Australian cousin highlights bad animal behavior, and Andrew Yang discusses his 2020 Democratic presidential bid.
3289	July 29	Angela Bassett	Otherhood	0.661
Trevor gives a rundown of President Trump's latest beefs, Dulce Sloan reacts to findings from relationship studies, and actor Angela Bassett discusses her role in Otherhood.
3290	July 30	Olivia Nuzzi	N/A	0.574
"World War D: 2 Fast 2 Furious 2 Many Candidates – Part I"; Trevor and The World's Fakest News Team go live after the Democratic debate to recap the biggest moments, and New York Magazine's Olivia Nuzzi offers her take on the night. Note: this episode was broadcast live.
3291	July 31	Cornell Belcher	N/A	0.597
"World War D: 2 Fast 2 Furious 2 Many Candidates – Part II"; Trevor gives continued live coverage of CNN's Democratic debates, Michael Kosta hobnobs with candidates and reporters, and MSNBC political analyst Cornell Belcher stops by. Note: this episode was broadcast live.

=== August ===
No.	Original air date	Guest(s)	Promotion	US viewers (millions)
3292	August 1	Diane Guerrero	Orange Is the New Black	0.583
A recording emerges of Ronald Reagan making racist remarks, Roy Wood Jr. explores seminal moments in hip-hop history, and Diane Guerrero discusses Orange Is the New Black.
3293	August 5	Eva Longoria	Dora and the Lost City of Gold	0.690
Trevor examines America's gun violence epidemic in the wake of mass shootings in El Paso and Dayton, and actor Eva Longoria discusses Dora and the Lost City of Gold.
3294	August 6	Marianne Williamson	Marianne Williamson 2020 presidential campaign	0.655
Mike Huckabee and Sean Hannity propose absurd solutions to America's mass shooting epidemic, and Marianne Williamson discusses her 2020 Democratic presidential campaign.
3295	August 7	Michael Bennet & Natasha Lyonne	Michael Bennet 2020 presidential campaign & Russian Doll	0.623
Democrats blast President Trump for his inaction on white supremacy and guns, Sen. Michael Bennet discusses his White House bid, and Natasha Lyonne chats about Russian Doll.
3296	August 8	Meek Mill	Free Meek	0.701
The owner of Equinox draws outrage for planning a Trump fundraiser, Turkmenistan's dictator appears in a video to prove he's not dead, and Meek Mill discusses Free Meek.
3297	August 12	Ayanna Pressley	N/A	0.720
Jeffrey Epstein's apparent suicide leads to conspiracy theories, the Iowa State Fair becomes a gaffe-fest for Joe Biden, and Rep. Ayanna Pressley sits down with Trevor.
3298	August 13	Burna Boy	African Giant	0.625
Advertisers distance themselves from Tucker Carlson over his comments downplaying white supremacy, and Burna Boy discusses and performs songs from his album African Giant.
3299	August 14	Bill de Blasio & Jada Pinkett Smith	Bill de Blasio 2020 presidential campaign & Angel Has Fallen	0.642
Trevor wonders if President Trump is trying to get Melania deported, Bill de Blasio talks about his 2020 White House bid, and Jada Pinkett Smith discusses Angel Has Fallen.

=== September ===
No.	Original air date	Guest(s)	Promotion	US viewers (millions)
3300	September 3	Shameik Moore	Wu-Tang: An American Saga	0.680
President Trump makes bizarre claims about Hurricane Dorian, Roy Wood Jr. examines the Popeyes chicken sandwich craze, and Shameik Moore discusses Wu-Tang: An American Saga.
3301	September 4	Bill Hader	It Chapter Two	0.587
Jaboukie Young-White proposes a novel solution to America's gun problem, Trevor highlights Joe Biden's latest gaffes, and Bill Hader discusses It Chapter Two.
3302	September 5	Steve Bullock & Tracee Ellis Ross	Steve Bullock 2020 presidential campaign & Mixed-ish	0.486
Raging fires threaten the Amazon, Montana Governor Steve Bullock talks about his 2020 White House bid, and Tracee Ellis Ross discusses mixed-ish and Pattern Beauty.
3303	September 9	Antoni Porowski	Porowski, Antoni; Fox, Mindy (9 September 2019). Antoni in the Kitchen. HarperCollins Publishers. ISBN 978-0358206170.	0.612
Trevor highlights President Trump's latest beefs, Michael Kosta and Jaboukie Young-White talk sports, and Queer Eye star Antoni Porowski discusses Antoni in the Kitchen.
3304	September 10	Brad Smith	Smith, Brad; Browne, Carol Ann (2019). Tools and Weapons: The Promise and the Peril of the Digital Age. Penguin. ISBN 978-1984877710.	0.584
President Trump eases restrictions on trophy hunting, Dulce Sloan investigates a firm that implants microchips in its employees, and Brad Smith discusses Tools and Weapons.
3305	September 11	Greta Thunberg	N/A	0.600
Drug companies face consequences for their role in the opioid crisis, Lewis Black talks about how digital screen time is affecting kids, and activist Greta Thunberg stops by.
3306	September 12	Jamelle Bouie	N/A	0.597
"Votegasm 2020: This Time Only the Best (and Five Other Candidates)"; In this live episode, Trevor covers the third 2020 Democratic presidential debate, and New York Times opinion columnist Jamelle Bouie gives his take on the event. Note: this episode was broadcast live.
3307	September 16	Sonia Sotomayor	Sotomayor, Sonia (3 September 2019). Just Ask!: Be Different, Be Brave, Be You. Penguin. ISBN 978-0525514121.	0.670
Brett Kavanaugh is accused of sexual misconduct again, President Trump hints at war on behalf of Saudi Arabia, and Supreme Court Justice Sonia Sotomayor discusses Just Ask!
3308	September 17	Bashir Salahuddin & Diallo Riddle	South Side	0.610
Elizabeth Warren and President Trump host very different rallies, and Bashir Salahuddin and Diallo Riddle discuss South Side.
3309	September 18	Jodi Kantor & Megan Twohey	Kantor, Jodi; Twohey, Megan (10 September 2019). She Said: Breaking the Sexual Harassment Story That Helped Ignite a Movement. Penguin Publishing. ISBN 978-0525560340.	0.504
An attack on Saudi Arabia's oil facilities leads to talk of war, Roy Wood Jr. weighs in on the blackest material on Earth, and Jodi Kantor and Megan Twohey discuss She Said.
3310	September 19	Edward Snowden	Snowden, Edward (17 September 2019). Permanent Record. Henry Holt and Company. ISBN 978-1250237231.	0.580
Canada's Justin Trudeau comes under fire for wearing blackface, Ronny Chieng rails against futuristic bar technology, and Edward Snowden discusses his book Permanent Record.
3311	September 24	Gavin Newsom	N/A	0.718
Nancy Pelosi launches an impeachment inquiry, Ronny Chieng refuses to get his hopes up about President Trump's downfall, and California Governor Gavin Newsom stops by.
3312	September 25	Nick Cannon	The Masked Singer	0.645
President Trump releases a summary of his call with Ukraine's president, Roy Wood Jr. covers a 2020 GOP primary debate, and Nick Cannon talks about his diverse career.
3313	September 26	Jameela Jamil	The Good Place	0.578
Trevor covers the whistleblower complaint against President Trump, Desi Lydic slams Trump for wasting an impeachment opportunity, and Jameela Jamil discusses The Good Place.
3314	September 30	Mark Sanford	Mark Sanford 2020 presidential campaign	0.721
Roy Wood Jr. reports on President Trump's whistleblower scandal, Ronny Chieng reacts to a viral "beer money" fundraiser, and GOP presidential candidate Mark Sanford stops by.

=== October ===
No.	Original air date	Guest(s)	Promotion	US viewers (millions)
3315	October 1	Anand Giridharadas	Winners Take All: The Elite Charade of Changing the World. ISBN 978-0451493248.	0.622
Trevor weighs the case for impeachment against Rudy Giuliani, Michael Kosta explores President Trump's moral blindness, and Anand Giridharadas discusses Winners Take All.
3316	October 2	Jacqueline Woodson	Woodson, Jacqueline (17 September 2019). Red at the Bone. Penguin. ISBN 978-0525535270.	0.732
Trevor highlights President Trump's unhinged border wall demands, Desi Lydic investigates a protest against Yelp, and Jacqueline Woodson discusses Red at the Bone.
3317	October 3	Tyler "Ninja" Blevins	Blevins, Tyler (20 August 2019). Get Good: My Ultimate Guide to Gaming. Clarkson Potter/Ten Speed. ISBN 978-1984826756.	0.542
Vice President Mike Pence becomes tainted by President Trump's Ukraine scandal, Trevor reacts to Amber Guyger's murder verdict, and Tyler "Ninja" Blevins discusses Get Good.
3318	October 7	Chanel Miller	Miller, Chanel (24 September 2019). Know My Name: A Memoir. Penguin. ISBN 978-0735223714.	0.605
President Trump abruptly pulls U.S. troops from northern Syria, Michael Kosta and Roy Wood Jr. cover sports news, and author Chanel Miller discusses her memoir Know My Name.
3319	October 8	Susan Rice	Rice, Susan (8 October 2019). Tough Love: My Story of the Things Worth Fighting For. Simon and Schuster. ISBN 978-1501189975.	0.682
The Trump administration blocks an ambassador's testimony to Congress, Lewis Black highlights the scourge of surprise medical bills, and Susan Rice discusses Tough Love.
3320	October 9	Will Smith	Gemini Man	0.742
China lashes out at the NBA over a team GM's support for Hong Kong protesters, Roy Wood Jr. talks to GOP presidential hopeful Bill Weld, and Will Smith discusses Gemini Man.
3321	October 10	Rand Paul	Paul, Rand (19 November 2019). The Case Against Socialism. HarperCollins. ISBN 978-0062954862.	0.630
California cuts power to hundreds of thousands to avoid wildfires, Turkey attacks America's Kurdish allies in Syria, and Sen. Rand Paul discusses The Case Against Socialism.
3322	October 14	Black Coffee	N/A	0.704
Desi Lydic examines President Trump's Middle East policies, Neal Brennan argues that Trump thinks he owns America, and Black Coffee discusses his musical journey.
3323	October 15	Alex Wagner	The Circus: Inside the Greatest Political Show on Earth	0.592
"Votegasm 2020: The Field Narrows from 10 to...12?" Trevor dissects the fourth 2020 Democratic debate live, Leo Deblin (Roy Wood Jr.) provides a service to candidates, and CBS News special correspondent Alex Wagner stops by. Note: this episode was broadcast live.
3324	October 16	Cyntoia Brown-Long & Ali Wong	Brown-Long, Cyntoia (15 October 2019). Free Cyntoia: My Search for Redemption in the American Prison System. Simon and Schuster. ISBN 978-1982141103. & Wong, Ali (2019). Dear Girls: Intimate Tales, Untold Secrets & Advice for Living Your Best Life. Random House. ISBN 978-0525508830.	0.633
Trevor looks at how Hunter Biden and the Trump children benefit from their family names, Cyntoia Brown-Long discusses Free Cyntoia, and Ali Wong chats about Dear Girls.
3325	October 17	Taika Waititi	Jojo Rabbit	0.560
Trevor tackles the latest onslaught of headlines, Dulce Sloan gives her take on President Trump's impeachment strategy, and director Taika Waititi discusses Jojo Rabbit.
3326	October 28	Beto O'Rourke & Michelle Yeoh	Beto O'Rourke 2020 presidential campaign & Last Christmas	0.588
President Trump gloats over the death of ISIS's leader, Beto O'Rourke discusses his 2020 White House bid, and actor Michelle Yeoh chats about her role in Last Christmas.
3327	October 29	Noname	N/A	0.542
Roy Wood Jr. reacts to Alexander Vindman's impeachment testimony, Californians flee massive wildfires, and rapper Noname talks about Noname's Book Club.
3328	October 30	Amy Klobuchar	Amy Klobuchar 2020 presidential campaign	0.657
Sean Spicer gets shady for the sake of a Dancing with the Stars victory, Ronny Chieng bashes Halloween, and Senator Amy Klobuchar discusses her 2020 presidential campaign.
3329	October 31	Hillary Clinton & Chelsea Clinton	Clinton, Hillary Rodham; Clinton, Chelsea (October 2019). The Book of Gutsy Women: Favorite Stories of Courage and Resilience. Simon and Schuster. ISBN 978-1501178412.	0.575
Washington Nationals fans celebrate their World Series win, Trevor covers worldwide protests, and Hillary Rodham Clinton and Chelsea Clinton discuss The Book of Gutsy Women.

=== November ===
No.	Original air date	Guest(s)	Promotion	US viewers (millions)
3330	November 4	Colson Whitehead	Whitehead, Colson (2019). The Nickel Boys: A Novel. National Geographic Books. ISBN 978-0385537070.	0.553
Drug smugglers cut holes in President Trump's border wall, Elizabeth Warren takes heat from her 2020 Democratic rivals, and Colson Whitehead discusses The Nickel Boys.
3331	November 5	Cory Booker & Edward Norton	Cory Booker 2020 presidential campaign & Motherless Brooklyn	0.522
Trevor highlights California's inmate firefighters, Senator Cory Booker talks about his 2020 presidential campaign, and Edward Norton discusses Motherless Brooklyn.
3332	November 6	Julián Castro	Julián Castro 2020 presidential campaign	0.740
Elizabeth Warren terrifies the superrich, Michael Kosta examines the alt-right's anti-masturbation stance, and Julian Castro discusses his Democratic presidential candidacy.
3333	November 7	Jenny Slate	Slate, Jenny (5 November 2019). Little Weirds. Little, Brown. ISBN 978-0316485340. & Stage Fright	0.537
The vaping industry allegedly targets teens, an expert (Michael Kosta) highlights Donald Trump's iconic posture, and Jenny Slate discusses Little Weirds and Stage Fright.
3334	November 11	Jim Himes & Anna Kendrick	Noelle	0.598
Michael Bloomberg prepares to join the Democratic primary field, Rep. Jim Himes discusses the impeachment inquiry into President Trump, and Anna Kendrick talks about Noelle.
3335	November 12	Noah Baumbach	Marriage Story	0.680
Former Trump administration officials churn out tell-all memoirs, Roy Wood Jr. highlights adorable animals in the news, and Noah Baumbach discusses his movie Marriage Story.
3336	November 13	Daniel Kaluuya	Queen & Slim	0.667
Impeachment hearings against President Trump go public, Jaboukie Young-White and Roy Wood Jr. try to sell Trump's childhood home, and Daniel Kaluuya discusses Queen & Slim.
3337	November 14	Steve Ballmer & Jeff Garlin	Jeff Garlin: Our Man in Chicago	0.567
Fox News writes off the Trump impeachment hearings as boring, Steve Ballmer discusses his USAFacts initiative, and Jeff Garlin talks about Jeff Garlin: Our Man in Chicago.
3338	November 18	Tom Steyer	Tom Steyer 2020 presidential campaign	0.553
Diplomat David Holmes adds fuel to Trump's Ukraine scandal, Desi Lydic and Michael Kosta serve up new presidential excuses, and Tom Steyer discusses his 2020 presidential bid.
3339	November 19	Lin-Manuel Miranda	His Dark Materials	0.562
Desi Lydic investigates Rep. Eric Swalwell's alleged televised fart, Michael Kosta and Roy Wood Jr. cover sports news, and Lin-Manuel Miranda discusses His Dark Materials.
3340	November 20	Alicia Menendez	Menendez, Alicia (5 November 2019). The Likeability Trap: How to Break Free and Succeed as You Are. HarperCollins. ISBN 978-0062838766.	0.660
"Votegasm 2020: The Roughin’ before the Stuffin’"; Trevor analyzes the fifth Democratic debate live, Roy Wood Jr. gets insight from black voters, and MSNBC anchor Alicia Menendez discusses her book The Likeability Trap. Note: this episode was broadcast live.
3341	November 21	Lena Waithe	Queen & Slim	0.600
Trevor discusses 2020 presidential candidate Andrew Yang, Roy Wood Jr. highlights black contributions to Thanksgiving, and Lena Waithe talks about her movie Queen & Slim.

=== December ===
No.	Original air date	Guest(s)	Promotion	US viewers (millions)
3342	December 2	Mark Ruffalo	Dark Waters	0.525
Trevor tackles developments in the 2020 Democratic primary, Michael Kosta defends Joe Biden's "No Malarkey" messaging, and Mark Ruffalo discusses his movie Dark Waters.
3343	December 3	Ta-Nehisi Coates	Coates, Ta-Nehisi (2019). The Water Dancer. Random House Publishing. ISBN 978-0399590597.	0.674
President Trump clashes with French President Emmanuel Macron, Roy Wood Jr. gets an education in alternative meat science, and Ta-Nehisi Coates discusses The Water Dancer.
3344	December 4	Brittany Howard	Jaime	0.660
Underwater speakers help revitalize dying coral reefs, NATO leaders laugh at President Trump behind his back, and Brittany Howard talks about her debut solo album Jaime.
3345	December 5	John Lithgow	Bombshell	0.571
Nancy Pelosi calls for drafting impeachment articles against President Trump, Jaboukie Young-White consults with the founding fathers, and John Lithgow discusses Bombshell.
3346	December 9	Kelly Marie Tran	Star Wars: The Rise of Skywalker	0.613
Joe Biden loses his temper at an Iowa town hall, Roy Wood Jr. and Michael Kosta cover sports news, and actor Kelly Marie Tran discusses Star Wars: The Rise of Skywalker.
3347	December 10	Alfre Woodard & Aldis Hodge	Clemency	0.727
President Trump faces impeachment articles, Lewis Black tackles misguided holiday pandering to Jewish people, and Alfre Woodard and Aldis Hodge discuss their film Clemency.
3348	December 11	Lupita Nyong'o	Star Wars: The Rise of Skywalker & Nyong'o, Lupita (15 October 2019). Sulwe. Simon and Schuster. ISBN 978-1534425361.	0.667
A report exposes official lies about the Afghanistan War, Ronny Chieng investigates body donation, and Lupita Nyong'o discusses Star Wars: The Rise of Skywalker and Sulwe.
3349	December 12	Solange Knowles	When I Get Home	0.545
Trevor highlights Trump family members' rotten behavior, Dulce Sloan examines disheartening workplace studies, and Solange Knowles discusses When I Get Home.
3350	December 16	Dan Soder	Son of a Gary	0.640
U.K. Prime Minister Boris Johnson is elected in a landslide victory, Jordan Klepper embeds himself outside a PA Trump rally, and comedian Dan Soder discusses Son of a Gary.
3351	December 17	Zozibini Tunzi	N/A	0.714
The black community faces a mental health treatment crisis, thieves steal millions of delivered holiday packages, and Miss Universe 2019 Zozibini Tunzi sits down with Trevor.
3352	December 18	Yahya Abdul-Mateen II	Watchmen	0.711
Michael Kosta discusses Democrats' mournful approach to impeachment, Ronny Chieng tackles global warming's effects on the holidays, and Yahya Abdul-Mateen II talks Watchmen.
3353	December 19	Mehdi Hasan	N/A	0.775
"Votegasm 2020: Worst Holiday Special Ever’"; Trevor covers the Democratic debate live, Jaboukie Young-White and Desi Lydic try a product for overwhelmed voters, and The Intercept's Mehdi Hasan discusses the primaries. Note: this episode was broadcast live.
