= Krawcheck =

Krawcheck is a surname. Notable people with the surname include:

- Leonard Krawcheck (born 1941), American politician and lawyer
- Sallie Krawcheck (born 1964), American businesswoman
