= List of The Daily Show episodes (2020) =

- No. of episodes: 162

Release
- Original network: Comedy Central
- Original release: January 6 – December 16, 2020

Season chronology
- ← Previous; 2019 episodes Next → 2021 episodes

This is a list of episodes for The Daily Show with Trevor Noah in 2020.

Due to the coronavirus pandemic, Noah began filming episodes from his home for the show's YouTube channel. On March 23, episodes—now titled The Daily Social Distancing Show with Trevor Noah—began to air on television. On April 27, episodes were expanded to 45 minutes.

== 2020 ==
=== January ===
No.	Original air date	Guest(s)	Promotion	U.S. viewers (millions)
3354	January 6	Karen Bass	N/A	0.684
The World's Fakest News Team analyzes President Trump's targeted killing of Iranian General Qasem Soleimani, and California Congresswoman Karen Bass sits down with Trevor.
3355	January 7	Ronan Farrow	Farrow, Ronan (15 October 2019). Catch and Kill: Lies, Spies, and a Conspiracy to Protect Predators. Little, Brown Book. ISBN 978-0708899250.	0.694
President Trump's targeted killing of Qassem Soleimani leads to chaos, Roy Wood Jr. braces for retaliation from Iran, and Ronan Farrow discusses his book Catch and Kill.
3356	January 8	Mo Rocca	Rocca, Mo (5 November 2019). Mobituaries: Great Lives Worth Reliving. Simon and Schuster. ISBN 978-1501197628.	0.717
Michael Kosta gets hawkish on Iran, Trevor reports on new laws taking effect in 2020, and CBS Sunday Morning correspondent Mo Rocca discusses his book Mobituaries.
3357	January 9	Jimmy Butler	N/A	0.685
Wildfires wreak havoc in Australia, Jaboukie Young-White visits climate change-ravaged Arizona, and Miami Heat basketball player Jimmy Butler sits down with Trevor.
3358	January 13	David Alan Grier	A Soldier's Play	0.574
Prince Harry and Meghan Markle's "stepping back" creates royal drama, President Trump tweets in Farsi about Iran protests, and David Alan Grier discusses A Soldier's Play.
3359	January 14	Rick Wilson	Wilson, Rick (2020). Running Against the Devil: A Plot to Save America from Trump—and Democrats from Themselves. Crown Publishing. ISBN 978-0593137581.	0.545
"Votegasm 2020: The Last Debate: Before the Rest of the Debates"; Trevor analyzes the Democratic debate live, Jordan Klepper examines Iowa's role in the primaries, and former GOP strategist Rick Wilson discusses Running Against the Devil. Note: This episode was broadcast live.
3360	January 15	Yara Shahidi	Grown-ish	0.701
Nancy Pelosi sends articles of impeachment to the Senate, Ronny Chieng reports on the CES 2020 tech expo, and actor/activist Yara Shahidi discusses her role on grown-ish.
3361	January 16	Susie Essman	Curb Your Enthusiasm	0.605
Lev Parnas implicates President Trump in the Ukraine scheme, Michael Kosta and Roy Wood Jr. cover sports, and actor and comedian Susie Essman discusses Curb Your Enthusiasm.
3362	January 20	Mary Frances Berry	Berry, Mary Frances (2018). History Teaches Us to Resist: How Progressive Movements Have Succeeded in Challenging Times. Beacon Press. ISBN 978-0807005460.	0.574
The New York Times announces a double presidential endorsement, Roy Wood Jr. covers iffy MLK Day celebrations, and Mary Frances Berry discusses History Teaches Us to Resist.
3363	January 21	BD Wong	Awkwafina Is Nora from Queens	0.526
President Trump's Senate impeachment trial begins, Michael Kosta weighs in on Mitch McConnell's impeachment rules, and actor BD Wong discusses Awkwafina is Nora from Queens.
3364	January 22	Kim Ghattas	Ghattas, Kim (28 January 2020). Black Wave: Saudi Arabia, Iran, and the Forty-Year Rivalry That Unraveled Culture, Religion, and Collective Memory in the Middle East. Henry Holt and Company. ISBN 978-1250131201.	0.712
Congress members clash at President Trump's impeachment trial, Desi Lydic investigates Arizona's rejection of daylight saving time, and Kim Ghattas discusses Black Wave.
3365	January 23	Kehinde Wiley	N/A	0.732
Senators duck out of President Trump's impeachment trial, Desi Lydic reacts to obstacles facing the Equal Rights Amendment, and artist Kehinde Wiley sits down with Trevor.
3366	January 27	Charles Yu	Yu, Charles (2020). Interior Chinatown. Knopf Doubleday Publishing. ISBN 978-0307907196.	0.728
John Bolton's memoir manuscript complicates the Trump impeachment saga, Desi Lydic investigates the Mars One program, and Charles Yu discusses his novel Interior Chinatown.
3367	January 28	Ilana Glazer	The Planet is Burning	0.624
Fox News takes aim at John Bolton, President Trump advances his anti-immigrant agenda, and comedian Ilana Glazer discusses The Planet Is Burning.
3368	January 29	Ezra Klein	Klein, Ezra (28 January 2020). Why We're Polarized. Avid Reader Press / Simon & Schuster. ISBN 978-1476700328.	0.712
Roy Wood Jr. reacts to the Trump administration's Middle East peace plan, the impeachment trial enters a new phase, and Vox editor Ezra Klein discusses Why We're Polarized.
3369	January 30	Matthew A. Cherry	Hair Love	0.665
Legal sports betting could take the U.S. by storm, Neal Brennan examines the GOP's kinky submission to President Trump, and filmmaker Matthew A. Cherry discusses Hair Love.

=== February ===
No.	Original air date	Guest(s)	Promotion	U.S. viewers (millions)
3370	February 3	Daniel Ricciardo	Formula 1: Drive to Survive	0.611
GOP senators reject impeachment trial witnesses, Jordan Klepper meets Iowa Trump supporters, and Formula 1 driver Daniel Ricciardo discusses Formula 1: Drive to Survive.
3371	February 4	Margaret Hoover	Firing Line with Margaret Hoover	0.702
Trevor and the Daily Show News Team provide live coverage of President Trump's State of the Union Address, and PBS's Firing Line host Margaret Hoover analyzes the speech. Note: This episode was broadcast live.
3372	February 5	Nikole Hannah-Jones	The 1619 Project	0.747
President Trump's impeachment trial ends, Roy Wood Jr. honors unsung black explorers, and New York Times reporter Nikole Hannah-Jones discusses the 1619 Project.
3373	February 10	Tochi Onyebuchi	Onyebuchi, Tochi (21 January 2020). Riot Baby. Tor Publishing. ISBN 978-1250214751.	0.723
Joe Biden targets Pete Buttigieg with a ruthless attack ad, Ronny Chieng examines the upcoming New Hampshire primary, and author Tochi Onyebuchi discusses Riot Baby.
3374	February 11	Wale	Wow... That's Crazy	0.626
Michael Kosta gives his take on the New Hampshire primary, Ronny Chieng rails against coronavirus misinformation, and Wale discusses his album Wow... That's Crazy.
3375	February 12	Lakeith Stanfield	The Photograph	0.660
Trevor covers the New Hampshire Democratic primary, Ronny Chieng examines Andrew Yang's exercise in universal basic income, and Lakeith Stanfield discusses The Photograph.
3376	February 13	Nick Kroll	Olympic Dreams	0.632
Michael Bloomberg takes heat for his past defense of "stop and frisk," Roy Wood Jr. expounds on the Chitlin' Circuit, and Nick Kroll discusses his movie Olympic Dreams.
3377	February 24	Anthony Mackie	Altered Carbon	0.631
Bernie Sanders wins the Nevada Democratic primary, President Trump receives a hero's welcome in India, and actor Anthony Mackie discusses his Netflix series Altered Carbon.
3378	February 25	Rahm Emanuel	Emanuel, Rahm (2020). The Nation City: Why Mayors Are Now Running the World. Knopf Doubleday Publishing. ISBN 978-0525656388.	0.637
"Votegasm 2020: The South Carolina Primary: Finally, A State with Black Voters"; Trevor examines the 10th Democratic debate live, Jaboukie Young-White interviews LGBTQ voters about Pete Buttigieg, and Rahm Emanuel discusses his book The Nation City. Note: This episode was broadcast live.
3379	February 26	Kiley Reid	Reid, Kiley (2019). Such a Fan Age. Penguin. ISBN 978-0525541905.	0.686
Trevor covers the growing coronavirus threat, Roy Wood Jr. highlights African-American fashion trailblazers, and author Kiley Reid discusses her novel Such a Fun Age.
3380	February 27	Jessie Reyez	Before Love Came to Kill Us	0.606
Trevor covers the coronavirus crisis, Jordan Klepper and Roy Wood Jr. talk to black primary voters in South Carolina, and Jessie Reyez discusses Before Love Came to Kill Us.

=== March ===
No.	Original air date	Guest(s)	Promotion	U.S. viewers (millions)
3381	March 2	Nina Dobrev	Run This Town	0.755
Joe Biden pulls off a major primary victory in South Carolina, Roy Wood Jr. gives tips on avoiding the coronavirus, and actor Nina Dobrev discusses her movie Run This Town.
3382	March 3	David Plouffe	Plouffe, David (3 March 2020). A Citizen's Guide to Beating Donald Trump. Penguin. ISBN 978-1984879493.	0.536
"Votegasm 2020: Super Tuesday: Enough of this One-State-At-A-Time Bullshit"; Trevor and Ronny Chieng cover Super Tuesday live, Desi Lydic interviews an X-rated activist, and author David Plouffe discusses A Citizen's Guide to Beating Donald Trump. Note: This episode was broadcast live.
3383	March 4	Judith Heumann	Heumann, Judith; Joiner, Kristen (25 February 2020). Being Heumann: An Unrepentant Memoir of a Disability Rights Activist. Beacon Press. ISBN 978-0807019290.	0.756
Trevor gives his next-day analysis of Super Tuesday, Lewis Black rails against the scourge of "sharenting," and activist Judith Heumann discusses her book Being Heumann.
3384	March 5	Nneka Ogwumike	N/A	0.623
Trevor examines the "forever chemicals" problem, Dulcé Sloan blasts America's lack of statues honoring women, and Los Angeles Sparks player Nneka Ogwumike discusses the WNBPA.
3385	March 9	Mikki Kendall	Kendall, Mikki (2020). Hood Feminism: Notes From the Women That a Movement Forgot. Penguin. ISBN 978-0525560548.	0.778
Trevor covers the effects of the coronavirus in Italy and the U.S., Jaboukie Young-White offers tips on staying coronavirus-free, and Mikki Kendall discusses Hood Feminism.
3386	March 10	Jason Reynolds and Ibram X. Kendi	Reynolds, Jason; Kendi, Ibram X. (10 March 2020). Stamped: Racism, Antiracism, and You: A Remix of the National Book Award-winning Stamped from the Beginning. Little, Brown Books for Young Readers. ISBN 978-0316453691.	0.673
The coronavirus leads to widespread "social distancing" in the U.S., Trevor unveils Trump's Best Word Bracket, and Jason Reynolds and Ibram X. Kendi discuss Stamped.
3387	March 11	Bill de Blasio & Lil Dicky	Dave	0.751
The W.H.O. declares the coronavirus a global pandemic, Mayor Bill de Blasio talks about New York City's response to coronavirus concerns, and actor Dave Burd discusses Dave.
3388	March 12	Octavia Spencer	Self Made	0.851
The NBA suspends its season indefinitely, President Trump addresses the nation about the coronavirus pandemic, and Octavia Spencer chats about Self Made.
Web	March 18	N/A	N/A	3.700 (views are based on the show's YouTube channel)
The Daily Social Distancing Show; Trevor provides updates on the coronavirus pandemic, checks in with Roy Wood Jr. over video chat, and offers ways for people to lend a hand to those most hurt by the crisis. Note: This episode was exclusive to the show's YouTube channel.
Web	March 19	N/A	N/A	4.500 (views are based on the show's YouTube channel)
The Daily Social Distancing Show; The latest on coronavirus: Trump fibs about a potential cure, governors take action, and spring break gets canceled. Also, Jaboukie Young-White checks in on Trevor during self-quarantine. Note: This episode was exclusive to the show's YouTube channel.
Web	March 20	N/A	N/A	4.216 (views are based on the show's YouTube channel)
The Daily Social Distancing Show; China begins to bounce back from coronavirus, U.S. senators allegedly profit off the pandemic, and Roy Wood Jr. reports on hospitals' shortage of medical supplies. Note: This episode was exclusive to the show's YouTube channel.
3389	March 23	N/A	N/A	0.580
The Daily Social Distancing Show; Trevor covers global coronavirus news, Desi Lydic describes life as a round-the-clock parent, and Roy Wood Jr. and Michael Kosta weigh in on Trump's Best Word Bracket.
3390	March 24	D-Nice	N/A	0.686
The Daily Social Distancing Show; President Trump itches for a premature end to social distancing, Michael Kosta gets to know his neighbors via binoculars, and DJ D-Nice talks Homeschool at Club Quarantine.
3391	March 25	Vivek Murthy	Murthy, Vivek (21 April 2020). Together: The Healing Power of Human Connection in a Sometimes Lonely World. HarperCollins. ISBN 978-0062913296.	0.838
The Daily Social Distancing Show; Trevor covers coronavirus news, Ronny Chieng gives a dispatch from Australia, and Dr. Vivek Murthy discusses challenges facing medical professionals and his book Together.
3392	March 26	Anthony Fauci	N/A	0.783
The Daily Social Distancing Show; Renowned immunologist Dr. Anthony Fauci discusses the threat posed by COVID-19, and Trevor releases anti-tourism ads to keep people from visiting Florida, Alaska and Hawaii.
3393	March 30	Gavin Newsom	N/A	0.832
The Daily Social Distancing Show; Trevor likens President Trump to Joe Exotic from Tiger King, Jaboukie Young-White interviews Dr. Peter Hotez, and California Governor Gavin Newsom discusses the coronavirus.
3394	March 31	Kevin Love	N/A	0.651
The Daily Social Distancing Show; Trevor and his correspondents try to determine what day it is, and Cleveland Cavaliers player Kevin Love discusses his efforts to keep arena workers paid during the pandemic.

=== April ===
No.	Original air date	Guest(s)	Promotion	U.S. viewers (millions)
3395	April 1	Gretchen Whitmer	N/A	0.701
The Daily Social Distancing Show; President Trump suddenly gets serious about the coronavirus, Ronny Chieng catches up with Andrew Yang, and Trevor interviews Michigan Governor Gretchen Whitmer about COVID-19.
3396	April 2	Bill Gates	N/A	0.730
The Daily Social Distancing Show; Trevor covers coronavirus news, Roy Wood Jr. goes into battle mode against COVID-19, and Bill Gates weighs in on the cause of the pandemic and the resources needed to end it.
3397	April 6	Jennifer Garner	N/A	0.800
The Daily Social Distancing Show; Trevor enlists his correspondents to help him figure out how to make a protective mask, and actress Jennifer Garner discusses her charitable initiative, Save with Stories.
3398	April 7	Gita Gopinath	N/A	0.793
The Daily Social Distancing Show; Wisconsin holds its primary election despite the pandemic, Roy Wood Jr. and Michael Kosta cap off Trump's Best Word Bracket, and Trevor interviews IMF economist Gita Gopinath.
3399	April 8	Roxane Gay	N/A	0.760
The Daily Social Distancing Show; Black Americans get hit hardest by COVID-19, Dulce Sloan roasts the backgrounds of news anchor footage, and Roxane Gay discusses her effort to help during the pandemic crisis.
3400	April 9	Darren Walker	N/A	0.782
The Daily Social Distancing Show; Divorces increase due to pandemic lockdowns, Jordan Klepper learns about doomsday preparation, and Darren Walker discusses the threat COVID-19 poses to incarcerated Americans.
3401	April 13	Claire Babineaux-Fontenot	N/A	0.752
The Daily Social Distancing Show; Trevor covers pandemic-era Easter celebrations, Desi Lydic talks about mental health self-care with Dr. Steven Taylor, and Claire Babineaux-Fontenot discusses Feeding America.
3402	April 14	Christina Koch	N/A	0.822
The Daily Social Distancing Show; President Trump insists he has total authority over the states, the correspondents offer video chatting etiquette, and astronaut Christina Koch chats with Trevor.
3403	April 15	Lori Lightfoot	N/A	0.790
The Daily Social Distancing Show; President Trump demands his signature on COVID-19 relief checks, Jaboukie Young-White basks in life under quarantine, and Chicago mayor Lori Lightfoot chats with Trevor.
3404	April 16	Mark Cuban	N/A	0.722
The Daily Social Distancing Show; Trevor examines COVID-19 conspiracy theories, Lewis Black describes his life under quarantine, and Mark Cuban discusses his work with the White House on reopening the economy.
3405	April 20	Phil Murphy & Stephen Curry	N/A	0.768
The Daily Social Distancing Show; Right-wing protesters gather to demand an end to statewide coronavirus lockdowns, and Trevor talks to New Jersey Governor Phil Murphy and NBA All-Star Stephen Curry.
3406	April 21	Amanda Nguyen	N/A	0.773
The Daily Social Distancing Show; President Trump announces an immigration ban, Jordan Klepper gets tips from survivalist Pat McNamara, and Rise CEO Amanda Nguyen discusses her Survivor Safe Haven program.
3407	April 22	Andrew Cuomo	N/A	0.690
The Daily Social Distancing Show; Trevor has an in-depth interview with New York Governor Andrew Cuomo about his urgent efforts to combat the COVID-19 pandemic and how the crisis has impacted him personally.
3408	April 23	Babyface & Teddy Riley	N/A	0.773
The Daily Social Distancing Show; President Trump remains consistently chaotic, Roy Wood Jr. mixes a quarantine cocktail, and Kenneth "Babyface" Edmonds and Teddy Riley discuss their R&B Instagram battle.
3409	April 27	Keisha Lance Bottoms	N/A	0.696
The Daily Social Distancing Show; President Trump suggests injected disinfectants can fight COVID-19, Roy Wood Jr. gets do-it-yourself haircut tips, and Trevor interviews Atlanta Mayor Keisha Lance Bottoms.
3410	April 28	Tammy Duckworth	N/A	0.700
The Daily Social Distancing Show; Banks and big businesses exploit the Paycheck Protection Program, Michael Kosta presents a travelogue of his home, and Trevor interviews Illinois Senator Tammy Duckworth.
3411	April 29	Larry Hogan	N/A	0.590
The Daily Social Distancing Show; COVID-19 deals a blow to America's food supply chain, The Daily Show correspondents look back on life before quarantine, and Trevor interviews Maryland Governor Larry Hogan.
3412	April 30	Danny Meyer	N/A	0.608
The Daily Social Distancing Show; Neighbors come up with novel ways to stay engaged with one another, Roy Wood Jr. and Michael Kosta cover sports news, and Trevor interviews renowned restaurateur Danny Meyer.

=== May ===
No.	Original air date	Guest(s)	Promotion	U.S. viewers (millions)
3413	May 4	Anders Tegnell	N/A	0.690
The Daily Social Distancing Show; Protesters demand an end to state lockdowns, Jaboukie Young-White talks to COVID-19 survivors about an anti-gay blood donation ban, and Trevor interviews Dr. Anders Tegnell.
3414	May 5	Thomas Piketty & Amandla Stenberg	Piketty, Thomas (2019). Capital and Ideology. Éditions du Seuil. ISBN 978-2021448207. & The Eddy	0.610
The Daily Social Distancing Show; Americans lash out against face mask requirements, author Thomas Piketty discusses Capital and Ideology, and actor Amandla Stenberg talks about The Eddy.
3415	May 6	José Andrés	N/A	0.615
The Daily Social Distancing Show; President Trump tours a mask plant without wearing a mask, Roy Wood Jr. talks to COVID-19 website creator Avi Schiffmann, and José Andrés discusses World Central Kitchen.
3416	May 7	Jason Isbell	Reunions	0.483
The Daily Social Distancing Show; Trevor examines college life in the coronavirus era, and musician Jason Isbell discusses his album Reunions and the COVID-19 pandemic's impact on the music industry.
3417	May 11	Bakari Sellers	Sellers, Bakari (2020). My Vanishing Country: A Memoir. HarperCollinsPublishers. ISBN 978-0062917454.	0.641
The Daily Social Distancing Show; White House staffers tests positive for COVID-19, Dulce Sloan gets advice on the importance of the U.S. Census, and Bakari Sellers discusses his memoir My Vanishing Country.
3418	May 12	Ricky Gervais	After Life	0.616
The Daily Social Distancing Show; Doctors find the coronavirus could ravage the entire body, Desi Lydic attempts a familial chat with Fox News's Jeanine Pirro, and Ricky Gervais discusses After Life.
3419	May 13	Eric Garcetti & Billy Porter	N/A	0.621
The Daily Social Distancing Show; Trevor highlights COVID-19's effects on the drug trade, Los Angeles Mayor Eric Garcetti discusses concerns about reopening, and Billy Porter talks about his art and activism.
3420	May 14	Scott Blubaugh & Yara Shahidi	N/A	0.550
The Daily Social Distancing Show; Desi Lydic examines President Trump's "Obamagate" accusations, Scott Blubaugh discusses COVID-19's effects on the U.S. food supply, and Yara Shahidi talks "Graduate Together."
3421	May 18	Madeleine Albright	Albright, Madeleine (14 April 2020). Hell and Other Destinations: A 21st-Century Memoir. HarperCollins Publishers. ISBN 978-0062802255.	0.706
The Daily Social Distancing Show; Barack Obama takes a swipe at President Trump, Jaboukie Young-White examines rich people in the COVID-19 era, and Madeleine Albright discusses Hell and Other Destinations.
3422	May 19	Kerry Moles & Brieanna Hayes	N/A	0.563
The Daily Social Distancing Show; President Trump claims to be on hydroxychloroquine, Jordan Klepper highlights counter-protesting nurses in North Carolina, and Kerry Moles and Brieanna Hayes discuss CASA-NYC.
3423	May 20	Jose Antonio Vargas & Chris Paul	Blackballed	0.510
The Daily Social Distancing Show; Trevor covers face mask news, Jose Antonio Vargas talks about COVID-19's effects on undocumented immigrants, and NBA star Chris Paul discusses his documentary Blackballed.
3424	May 21	Taraji P. Henson	N/A	0.517
The Daily Social Distancing Show; Teachers adapt to daunting COVID-19 challenges, Michael Kosta talks to Florida's Grim Reaper protester, and Taraji P. Henson discusses the Boris Lawrence Henson Foundation.

=== June ===
No.	Original air date	Guest(s)	Promotion	U.S. viewers (millions)
3425	June 8	Miski Noor & Anquan Boldin	N/A	0.702
The Daily Social Distancing Show; Police get violent with peaceful protesters, Black Visions Collective's Miski Noor examines police brutality in Minneapolis, and Anquan Boldin discusses the Players Coalition.
3426	June 9	Patrisse Cullors, Josie Duffy Rice, Sam Sinyangwe, Mychal Denzel Smith, & Alex S. Vitale	N/A	0.579
The Daily Social Distancing Show; Patrisse Cullors, Josie Duffy Rice, Sam Sinyangwe, Mychal Denzel Smith and Alex S. Vitale join Trevor for a panel on movements to radically reimagine policing in the U.S.
3427	June 10	Joe Biden	Joe Biden 2020 presidential campaign	0.616
The Daily Social Distancing Show; Georgia's primary voters endure long lines and faulty equipment at the polls, and former Vice President Joe Biden discusses police reform and running against President Trump.
3428	June 11	Spike Lee & Josh Gad	Da 5 Bloods & Central Park, Artemis Fowl and Reunited Part	0.441
The Daily Social Distancing Show; Roy Wood Jr. proposes a union to counter police unions, Spike Lee discusses his movie Da 5 Bloods, and actor Josh Gad talks about Central Park, Artemis Fowl, and Reunited Apart.
3429	June 15	Stacey Abrams & Alicia Keys	Abrams, Stacey (9 June 2020). Our Time Is Now: Power, Purpose, and the Fight for a Fair America. Henry Holt and Company. ISBN 978-1250257703.	0.649
The Daily Social Distancing Show; The Supreme Court rules to protect LGBTQ employees' rights, Stacey Abrams discusses Our Time Is Now, and Alicia Keys talks about her new song.
3430	June 16	Tim Scott & Gabrielle Union	N/A	0.538
The Daily Social Distancing Show; Jaboukie Young-White helps Michael Kosta become a better ally, Senator Tim Scott discusses police reform, and Gabrielle Union talks about the ubiquity of racism in America.
3431	June 17	Alphonso David & Matt Ryan	N/A	0.754
The Daily Social Distancing Show; President Trump downplays COVID-19, Alphonso David discusses the Supreme Court's LGBTQ+ anti-discrimination ruling, and NFL quarterback Matt Ryan talks about his activism.
3432	June 18	Kimberly Jones & LL Cool J	Jones, Kimberly Latrice; Jones, Kimberly; Segal, Gilly (2019). I'm Not Dying with You Tonight. Sourcebooks Fire. ISBN 978-1492678892.	0.579
The Daily Social Distancing Show; Dulce Sloan shares a Juneteenth history lesson, activist Kimberly Jones discusses I'm Not Dying with You Tonight, and LL Cool J talks about his Rock the Bells initiative.
3433	June 22	Malcolm Jenkins & Laverne Cox	N/A	0.697
The Daily Social Distancing Show; President Trump's rally in Tulsa, OK, is a dud, Malcolm Jenkins discusses Black Lives Matter and Listen Up Media, and Laverne Cox talks trans representation.
3434	June 23	Seth Stoughton & D. L. Hughley	Stoughton, Seth W.; Noble, Jeffrey J.; Alpert, Geoffrey P. (26 May 2020). Evaluating Police Uses of Force. NYU Press. ISBN 978-1479814657. & Hughley, Darryl L.; Moe, Doug (2020). Surrender, White People!: Our Unconditional Terms for Peace. HarperCollinsPublishers. ISBN 978-0062953704.	0.552
The Daily Social Distancing Show; Trevor examines Black employment barriers, talks to Evaluating Police Uses of Force co-author Seth Stoughton and interviews D.L. Hughley about Surrender, White People!
3435	June 24	Bubba Wallace & John Legend	Bigger Love	0.608
The Daily Social Distancing Show; NASCAR driver Bubba Wallace reflects on the noose controversy, Trevor introduces Blacklexa, and John Legend talks about fighting for racial equality and his album Bigger Love.
3436	June 25	Jon Stewart	Irresistible	0.617
The Daily Social Distancing Show; TV shows glorifying lawless cops face backlash, Roy Wood Jr. talks to Dr. Juanakee Adams about protester vandalism of her business, and Jon Stewart discusses Irresistible.

=== July ===
No.	Original air date	Guest(s)	Promotion	U.S. viewers (millions)
3437	July 13	Hillary Clinton	Hillary	0.680
The Daily Social Distancing Show; President Trump finally wears a mask in public, Michael Kosta weighs in on safely reopening schools, and Hillary Clinton discusses the Hulu docuseries Hillary and more.
3438	July 14	Hannibal Buress	Miami Nights	0.646
The Daily Social Distancing Show; Joe Biden leads President Trump in polls, Dulce Sloan highlights the importance of taking the census, and Hannibal Buress discusses his stand-up special Miami Nights.
3439	July 15	Katie Porter & Danai Gurira	N/A	0.604
The Daily Social Distancing Show; Trevor highlights corrupt cops in L.A., Rep. Katie Porter weighs in on reopening schools, and actor Danai Gurira discusses Difficult Conversations with My White Friends.
3440	July 16	Michele Harper & Patton Oswalt	Harper, Michele (2020). The Beauty in Breaking: A Memoir. Penguin. ISBN 978-0525537380. & I'll Be Gone in the Dark	0.594
The Daily Social Distancing Show; Trevor covers international COVID-19 news, Dr. Michele Harper discusses her memoir The Beauty in Breaking, and Patton Oswalt talks about I'll Be Gone in the Dark.
3441	July 20	Susan Rice & Nathalie Emmanuel	Rice, Susan (8 October 2019). Tough Love: My Story of the Things Worth Fighting For. Simon and Schuster. ISBN 978-1501189975. & Die Hart	0.622
The Daily Social Distancing Show; Fox News's Chris Wallace grills President Trump, Tough Love author Susan Rice discusses the Trump administration's COVID-19 response, and Nathalie Emmanuel talks Die Hart.
3442	July 21	Buju Banton	Upside Down 2020	0.694
The Daily Social Distancing Show; Trevor highlights heightened unrest in Portland, OR, Roy Wood Jr. and Michael Kosta discuss the NBA's "bubble," and Buju Banton talks about his album Upside Down 2020.
3443	July 22	Jim Carrey	Carrey, Jim; Vachon, Dana (5 May 2020). Memoirs and Misinformation: A Novel. National Geographic Books. ISBN 978-0525655978.	0.578
The Daily Social Distancing Show; President Trump pretends to take the coronavirus seriously again, Jordan Klepper visits a pro-Trump boat rally, and Jim Carrey discusses his book Memoirs and Misinformation.
3444	July 23	Esther Perel	Where Should We Begin	0.662
The Daily Social Distancing Show; Trevor compares America's handling of the Spanish flu and COVID-19, Desi Lydic checks in on her uncle Rudy, and Esther Perel discusses her podcast Where Should We Begin.
3445	July 27	Eddie Glaude	Glaude, Eddie S. (2020). Begin Again: James Baldwin's America and Its Urgent Lessons for Our Own. Crown. ISBN 978-0525575320.	0.692
The Daily Social Distancing Show; Trevor gives a rundown of COVID-19 news, Desi Lydic helps white people become anti-racist, and "Begin Again" author Eddie S. Glaude Jr. discusses the life of James Baldwin.
3446	July 28	Tina Knowles & Leigh Chapman	N/A	0.655
The Daily Social Distancing Show; Senate Republicans propose steep cuts to unemployment benefits, Lewis Black would rather die than try outdoor dining, and Tina Knowles-Lawson and Leigh Chapman discuss voting rights.
3447	July 29	Michael Tubbs & Liza Koshy	Stockton on My Mind & Work It	0.581
The Daily Social Distancing Show; Trevor highlights the erasure of powerful Black women activists from history, Stockton, CA, mayor Michael Tubbs discusses Stockton on My Mind, and Liza Koshy talks about Work It.
3448	July 30	Nadia Murad	Murad, Nadia; Krajeski, Jenna (October 2018). The Last Girl: My Story of Captivity, and My Fight Against the Islamic State. Crown. ISBN 978-1524760441.	0.587
The Daily Social Distancing Show; Trevor examines the life and legacy of Breonna Taylor, Michael Kosta learns about poop-based medical research, and The Last Girl author Nadia Murad talks about her fight against genocide.

=== August ===
No.	Original air date	Guest(s)	Promotion	U.S. viewers (millions)
3449	August 10	Pramila Jayapal & Michaela Coel	Jayapal, Pramila (2020). Use the Power You Have: A Brown Woman's Guide to Politics and Political Change. New Press. ISBN 978-1620971437. & I May Destroy You	0.621
The Daily Social Distancing Show; Jaboukie Young-White proposes an unlikely running mate for Joe Biden, Representative Pramila Jayapal discusses Use the Power You Have, and Michaela Coel talks about I May Destroy You.
3450	August 11	Sterling K. Brown	N/A	0.655
The Daily Social Distancing Show; President Trump crusades against mail-in voting, Roy Wood Jr. examines the origins of citizen's arrest laws, and This Is Us star Sterling K. Brown discusses One Million Truths.
3451	August 12	W. Kamau Bell	United Shades of America	0.647
The Daily Social Distancing Show; Trevor highlights the career of Senator Kamala Harris, Jaboukie Young-White reconnects with vaccine expert Dr. Peter Hotez, and W. Kamau Bell discusses United Shades of America.
3452	August 13	Kenya Barris & Isabel Wilkerson	Black-ish & Wilkerson, Isabel (2020). Caste: The Origins of Our Discontents. Random House Publishing. ISBN 978-0593230251.	0.690
The Daily Social Distancing Show; Dulce Sloan and singer Margo Price react to sexist attacks on Kamala Harris, Kenya Barris talks about his shows Black-ish controversial episode, and author Isabel Wilkerson discusses Caste.
3453	August 17	Jim Clyburn	N/A	0.568
The Daily Social Distancing Show "Votegasm 2020: The Democratic National Convention – Electing America's First Black President's Friend"; Trevor covers pushback against U.S. Postal Service cuts, Michael Kosta examines a coronavirus checkpoint clash in South Dakota, and House Majority Whip Jim Clyburn discusses Kamala Harris.
3454	August 18	Common & Veronica Chambers	Chambers, Veronica (18 August 2020). Finish the Fight!: The Brave and Revolutionary Women Who Fought for the Right to Vote. Houghton Mifflin Harcourt. ISBN 978-0358408307.	0.501
The Daily Social Distancing Show "Votegasm 2020: The Democratic National Convention – Electing America's First Black President's Friend"; Dulce Sloan observes the 100th anniversary of the 19th Amendment, Common talks about his organization, and Finish the Fight! author Veronica Chambers discusses the American suffrage movement.
3455	August 19	Eva Longoria	N/A	0.515
The Daily Social Distancing Show "Votegasm 2020: The Democratic National Convention – Electing America's First Black President's Friend"; Conservatives question Kamala Harris's Black identity, Jaboukie Young-White talks to members of the Young Delegates Coalition, and actor Eva Longoria discusses Momento Latino.
3456	August 20	Bernie Sanders	N/A	0.510
The Daily Social Distancing Show "Votegasm 2020: The Democratic National Convention – Electing America's First Black President's Friend"; Kamala Harris officially accepts the nomination for vice president, Trevor rolls out a short biopic about Joe Biden, and Bernie Sanders calls for a broad coalition to defeat President Trump.
3457	August 21	Tracee Ellis Ross	The High Note	0.412
The Daily Social Distancing Show "Votegasm 2020: The Democratic National Convention – Electing America's First Black President's Friend"; Desi Lydic Fox-splains Kamala Harris, Dulce Sloan talks to drag queens getting out the vote, and Black-ish star Tracee Ellis Ross discusses moderating at the 2020 DNC and The High Note.
3458	August 24	Stuart Stevens & Radhika Jones and Ta-Nehisi Coates	Stevens, Stuart (2020). It Was All a Lie: How the Republican Party Became Donald Trump. Knopf Doubleday Publishing. ISBN 978-0525658450.	0.628
The Daily Social Distancing Show "Votegasm 2020: The Republican National Convention – Celebrating February's Record Economy"; Trevor examines the QAnon conspiracy theory, Stuart Stevens discusses The Lincoln Project and It Was All a Lie, and Radhika Jones and Ta-Nehisi Coates talk about co-editing Vanity Fair.
3459	August 25	Chris Evans and Mark Kassen	A Starting Point	0.624
The Daily Social Distancing Show "Votegasm 2020: The Republican National Convention – Celebrating February's Record Economy"; Trevor covers the Republican National Convention, Desi Lydic and Roy Wood Jr. host a game of America's Got Suppression, and Chris Evans and Mark Kassen discuss A Starting Point.
3460	August 26	Ramy Youssef	Ramy	0.617
The Daily Social Distancing Show "Votegasm 2020: The Republican National Convention – Celebrating February's Record Economy"; Trevor discusses the police shooting of Jacob Blake and its aftermath, Jordan Klepper examines the state of the Federal Election Commission, and Ramy Youssef talks about his series Ramy.
3461	August 27	None	N/A	0.718
The Daily Social Distancing Show "Votegasm 2020: The Republican National Convention – Celebrating February's Record Economy"; Vice President Pence gives a slyly dishonest RNC speech, Trevor unveils a biopic about President Trump's unmatched greatness, and Jaboukie Young-White talks to RNC delegate Michael Albrecht.
3462	August 28	Doc Rivers and Steve Ballmer & Keke Palmer	2020 MTV Video Music Awards	0.496
The Daily Social Distancing Show "Votegasm 2020: The Republican National Convention – Celebrating February's Record Economy"; Dulce Sloan reacts to home decor choices on display at the DNC and RNC, Doc Rivers and Steve Ballmer discuss the NBA players' strike, and Keke Palmer talks about hosting the MTV VMAs 2020.

=== September ===
No.	Original air date	Guest(s)	Promotion	U.S. viewers (millions)
3463	September 8	Malcolm Gladwell & Lamorne Morris	Revisionist History & Woke	0.546
The Daily Social Distancing Show; Trevor covers the latest in coronavirus news, author Malcolm Gladwell discusses his podcast Revisionist History, and actor and comedian Lamorne Morris talks about his Hulu series Woke.
3464	September 9	Jane Fonda	Fonda, Jane (2020). What Can I Do?: My Path from Climate Despair to Action. Penguin. ISBN 978-0593296226.	0.724
The Daily Social Distancing Show; Recordings reveal President Trump downplayed COVID-19, Desi Lydic talks to the founder of gender reveal parties, and What Can I Do? author Jane Fonda discusses climate change activism.
3465	September 10	Peter Strzok & Samuel L. Jackson	Strzok, Peter (September 2020). Compromised: Counterintelligence and the Threat of Donald J. Trump. Houghton Mifflin Harcourt. ISBN 978-0358237068. & Enslaved	0.496
The Daily Social Distancing Show; Ronny Chieng reacts to a campus controversy involving a Chinese word, ex-FBI agent Peter Strzok discusses his book "Compromised," and Samuel L. Jackson talks about his docuseries Enslaved.
3466	September 14	Mychal Denzel Smith	Smith, Mychal Denzel (8 September 2020). Stakes Is High: Life After the American Dream. PublicAffairs. ISBN 978-1568588735.	0.467
The Daily Social Distancing Show; Trevor highlights blatant disregard for COVID-19 health measures in the U.S., Dulce Sloan examines the history of Black hair in America, and Mychal Denzel Smith discusses Stakes Is High.
3467	September 15	Mark Ruffalo	N/A	0.556
The Daily Social Distancing Show; Trevor examines travel in the coronavirus era, Michael Kosta and Roy Wood Jr. talk sports, and Mark Ruffalo reflects on the police violence and protests in his hometown of Kenosha, WI.
3468	September 16	Jon Tester & Big Sean	Tester, Jon (15 September 2020). Grounded: A Senator's Lessons on Winning Back Rural America. HarperCollins Publishers. ISBN 978-0062977489. & Detroit 2	0.583
The Daily Social Distancing Show; Lewis Black gives tips for ex-city dwellers on how to endure life in the suburbs, Senator Jon Tester discusses his memoir Grounded, and rapper Big Sean talks about his album Detroit 2.
3469	September 17	Sherrilyn Ifill & Ewan McGregor	Long Way Up	0.608
The Daily Social Distancing Show; Trevor calls on viewers to participate in the Pandemmy Awards, Sherrilyn Ifill discusses the NAACP Legal Defense Fund, and Ewan McGregor talks about his travel docuseries Long Way Up.
3470	September 21	Anthony Fauci	N/A	0.550
The Daily Social Distancing Show; Trevor honors the life and legacy of late Supreme Court Justice Ruth Bader Ginsburg, and Dr. Anthony Fauci returns to discuss the current state of the coronavirus pandemic in the U.S.
3471	September 22	Dahlia Lithwick & Patrisse Cullors	Khan-Cullors, Patrisse; Bandele, Asha (16 January 2018). When They Call You a Terrorist: A Black Lives Matter Memoir. St. Martin's Publishing. ISBN 978-1250171085.	0.507
The Daily Social Distancing Show; Desi Lydic calls her "uncle" Lou Dobbs, Slate's Dahlia Lithwick discusses Ruth Bader Ginsburg, and Black Lives Matter cofounder Patrisse Cullors talks about When They Call You a Terrorist.
3472	September 23	Bob Woodward	Woodward, Bob (15 September 2020). Rage. Simon and Schuster. ISBN 978-1982131739.	0.640
The Daily Social Distancing Show; The U.S. presidential election faces threats at home and from abroad, Dulce Sloan makes an economic case against police brutality, and journalist Bob Woodward discusses his book Rage.
3473	September 24	Desus Nice and The Kid Mero & Jeff Daniels	Mero, Desus (2020). God-Level Knowledge Darts: Life Lessons from the Bronx. Random House Publishing. ISBN 978-0525512332. & The Comey Rule	0.565
The Daily Social Distancing Show; A grand jury declines to charge police for the killing of Breonna Taylor, Desus Nice and The Kid Mero talk about God-Level Knowledge Darts, and Jeff Daniels discusses The Comey Rule.
3474	September 28	Jane Goodall	N/A	0.551
The Daily Social Distancing Show; The New York Times publishes a major report on President Trump's taxes, Roy Wood Jr. examines voting rights for Florida's ex-felons, and Dr. Jane Goodall discusses chimps and climate change.
3475	September 29	Misty Copeland	Copeland, Misty (2020). Bunheads. Penguin. ISBN 978-0399547645.	0.666
The Daily Social Distancing Show; Trevor dives into California's wildfire crisis, Ronny Chieng talks to Philippe Reines about his 2016 role as Donald Trump in mock debates, and dancer Misty Copeland discusses Bunheads.
3476	September 30	Al Sharpton & John Cena	Sharpton, Al (29 September 2020). Rise Up: Confronting a Country at the Crossroads. Hanover Square Press. ISBN 978-1335966629. & Cena, John (2020). Elbow Grease: Fast Friends. Random House Children's Books. ISBN 978-0593179345.	0.838
The Daily Social Distancing Show; Desi Lydic and Ronny Chieng provide coaching during the first presidential debate, Al Sharpton discusses his book Rise Up, and John Cena talks about his book Elbow Grease: Fast Friends.

=== October ===
No.	Original air date	Guest(s)	Promotion	U.S. viewers (millions)
3477	October 1	Mariah Carey	Carey, Mariah (29 September 2020). The Meaning of Mariah Carey. Henry Holt and Company. ISBN 978-1250164681. & The Rarities	0.574
The Daily Social Distancing Show; Presidential debates face rule changes, Ronny Chieng tries on a COVID-19 protection suit for partiers, and Mariah Carey discusses The Meaning of Mariah Carey and The Rarities.
3478	October 5	Jason Momoa & Kat Graham	Gather & Cut Throat City	0.610
The Daily Social Distancing Show; President Trump battles COVID-19, Jaboukie Young-White reacts to Melania Trump's anti-Christmas decorating rant, Jason Momoa discusses Gather, and Kat Graham talks about Cut Throat City.
3479	October 6	Jason Sudeikis	Ted Lasso	0.600
The Daily Social Distancing Show; Trevor highlights the history of U.S. presidents hiding their ailments, Roy Wood Jr. examines GOP efforts to suppress mail-in votes, and Jason Sudeikis discusses his series Ted Lasso.
3480	October 7	Alexandra Pelosi & Colin Quinn	American Selfie & Quinn, Colin (22 September 2020). Overstated: A Coast-to-Coast Roast of the 50 States. St. Martin's Publishing. ISBN 978-1250268440.	0.667
The Daily Social Distancing Show; The coronavirus runs rampant in the White House and the Pentagon, Alexandra Pelosi discusses her documentary American Selfie, and comedian Colin Quinn talks about his book Overstated.
3481	October 8	Alex Wagner	The Circus: Inside the Greatest Political Show on Earth	0.683
The Daily Social Distancing Show; Dulce Sloan weighs in on the vice presidential debate, Jordan Klepper goes to a Trump rally in Pennsylvania, and The Circus cohost Alex Wagner talks about the presidential election.
3482	October 13	Anita Hill	N/A	0.677
The Daily Social Distancing Show; President Trump makes a defiant return to the campaign trail, Jaboukie Young-White learns about the Power the Polls initiative, and attorney Anita Hill discusses the Hollywood Commission.
3483	October 14	Wilmer Valderrama	NCIS	0.717
The Daily Social Distancing Show; Trevor examines militias in America, Roy Wood Jr. reconnects with a panel of Black voters, and actor and activist Wilmer Valderrama discusses NCIS and the importance of Latino voters.
3484	October 15	Andrew Cuomo & Nick Offerman	Cuomo, Andrew (October 2020). American Crisis: Leadership Lessons from the COVID-19 Pandemic. Crown. ISBN 978-0593239261. & All Rise	0.573
The Daily Social Distancing Show; Team Trump pushes conspiracy theories aimed at Joe Biden, New York governor Andrew Cuomo discusses American Crisis, and Nick Offerman talks about his audio comedy special All Rise.
3485	October 20	Matthew McConaughey & José Andrés	McConaughey, Matthew (20 October 2020). Greenlights. Crown. ISBN 978-0593139134.	0.681
The Daily Social Distancing Show; Trevor examines a protest movement against police brutality in Nigeria, actor Matthew McConaughey talks about his memoir Greenlights, and Jose Andres discusses Chefs for the Polls.
3486	October 21	Chris Rock	Fargo	0.597
The Daily Social Distancing Show; Trevor covers electoral battles in the U.S. Senate, Michael Kosta talks to three deception artists about President Trump's constant lying, and Chris Rock talks about his role on Fargo.
3487	October 22	Elizabeth Warren	N/A	0.631
The Daily Social Distancing Show; Roy Wood Jr. begins the countdown of President Trump's top 100 scandals, Desi Lydic Fox-splains allegations against Hunter Biden, and Sen. Elizabeth Warren discusses the presidential race.
3488	October 23	Alicia Garza & Rashida Jones	Garza, Alicia (2020). The Purpose of Power: How We Come Together When We Fall Apart. Random House Publishing. ISBN 978-0525509684. & On the Rocks	0.402
The Daily Social Distancing Show; Trevor covers the final presidential debate between Donald Trump and Joe Biden, activist Alicia Garza discusses her book The Purpose of Power, and Rashida Jones talks about On the Rocks.
3489	October 26	Bruce Springsteen	Letter to You	0.676
The Daily Social Distancing Show; Early voting surges in the U.S., Roy Wood Jr. continues his countdown of President Trump's top 100 scandals, and Bruce Springsteen talks about his album and documentary Letter to You.
3490	October 27	Chelsea Handler	Chelsea Handler: Evolution	0.601
The Daily Social Distancing Show; Jaboukie Young-White serves as President Trump's beleaguered teleprompter operator, Desi Lydic talks to undecided voters, and comedian Chelsea Handler discusses her special Evolution.
3491	October 28	Ice Cube	N/A	0.721
The Daily Social Distancing Show; Trevor examines Halloween in the coronavirus era, Roy Wood Jr. continues his countdown of President Trump's 100 worst scandals, and Ice Cube discusses the Contract with Black America.
3492	October 29	Kamala Harris	Joe Biden 2020 presidential campaign	0.662
The Daily Social Distancing Show; Roy Wood Jr. discusses Black men's support for President Trump, Jordan Klepper chats with Trump rally-goers in Lancaster, PA, and Trevor talks to vice presidential candidate Kamala Harris.
Special	October 30	N/A	N/A	0.385
The Daily Show with Trevor Noah Presents: Remembering RBG – A Nation Ugly Cries with Desi Lydic

=== November ===
No.	Original air date	Guest(s)	Promotion	U.S. viewers (millions)
3493	November 2	Michael Harriot	N/A	0.650
The Daily Social Distancing Show; Roy Wood Jr. highlights more of President Trump's top 100 scandals, Michael Kosta talks to suburban white women who support Trump, and The Root's Michael Harriot discusses the Black vote.
3494	November 3	Don Cheadle & Tressie McMillan Cottom	N/A	0.341
The Daily Social Distancing Show "Votegasm 2020: What Could Go Wrong? (Again)"; In this one-hour special, Trevor and the correspondents provide live Election Night coverage as America braces itself to find out who will win the Trump-Biden presidential race. Note: This episode was broadcast live. The episode was simulcast on MTV, MTV2, VH1, BET, BET Her and Pop TV. The episode was also live streaming on Facebook, Twitter, and YouTube.
3495	November 4	Geraldo Cadava & Evan Osnos	Cadava, Geraldo (2020). The Hispanic Republican: The Shaping of an American Political Identity, from Nixon to Trump. HarperCollinsPublishers. ISBN 978-0062946348. & Osnos, Evan (27 October 2020). Joe Biden: The Life, the Run, and What Matters Now. Simon and Schuster. ISBN 978-1982174026.	0.617
The Daily Social Distancing Show; Roy Wood Jr. gives up on polls over the unexpected closeness of Election 2020, Trevor talks to The Hispanic Republican author Geraldo Cadava, and Evan Osnos discusses his book Joe Biden.
3496	November 5	Soledad O'Brien	Very Opinionated	0.600
The Daily Social Distancing Show; Coronavirus cases soar in the U.S., Michael Kosta learns about potential post-election chaos, and Soledad O'Brien discusses problematic punditry and her podcast Very Opinionated.
3497	November 9	Ruby Bridges & Anthony Anderson	Bridges, Ruby (10 November 2020). This Is Your Time. Random House Children's Books. ISBN 978-0593378526. & Black-ish	0.758
The Daily Social Distancing Show; President Trump refuses to concede the election to Joe Biden, activist Ruby Bridges discusses her book This Is Your Time, and actor Anthony Anderson talks about his role on Black-ish.
3498	November 10	Lenny Kravitz	Kravitz, Lenny; Ritz, David (6 October 2020). Let Love Rule. Henry Holt and Company. ISBN 978-1250113085.	0.666
The Daily Social Distancing Show; GOP leaders back President Trump's refusal to concede to Joe Biden, Trevor breaks down the history of presidential concession speeches, and Lenny Kravitz discusses his book Let Love Rule.
3499	November 11	Halsey	Halsey (10 November 2020). I Would Leave Me If I Could.: A Collection of Poetry. Simon and Schuster. ISBN 978-1982135607.	0.711
The Daily Social Distancing Show; Trevor highlights some uplifting developments, Michael Kosta talks to Americans seeking dental care in Mexico, and singer-songwriter Halsey discusses her book I Would Leave Me if I Could.
3500	November 12	Megan Rapinoe & Forest Whitaker	Rapinoe, Megan; Brockes, Emma (10 November 2020). One Life. Penguin. ISBN 978-1984881168. & Jingle Jangle: A Christmas Journey	0.689
The Daily Social Distancing Show; Africa sets a global example for how to handle COVID-19, soccer star Megan Rapinoe discusses her memoir One Life, and actor Forest Whitaker talks about his holiday film Jingle Jangle.
3501	November 16	Ta-Nehisi Coates	N/A	0.582
The Daily Social Distancing Show; President Trump continues to insist he won reelection, Desi Lydic tries to reason with her paranoid "cousin" Tucker Carlson, and Ta-Nehisi Coates discusses two film adaptations of his books.
3502	November 17	Kevin Hart	Zero F**Ks Given	0.570
The Daily Social Distancing Show; Trevor gives a primer on faithless electors, Jordan Klepper talks to pro-Trump demonstrators at the Million MAGA March, and Kevin Hart discusses his stand-up special Zero F**ks Given.
3503	November 18	Lucy McBath & Lindsey Vonn	McBath, Lucy (17 November 2020). Standing Our Ground: A Mother's Story. Simon and Schuster. ISBN 978-1501187797. & The Pack	0.644
The Daily Social Distancing Show; Lewis Black reacts to the rise of far-right news networks in the U.S., Georgia Congresswoman Lucy McBath discusses her memoir Standing Our Ground, and Lindsey Vonn talks about The Pack.
3504	November 19	Bill Gates	Bill Gates and Rashida Jones Ask Big Questions	0.643
The Daily Social Distancing Show; Rudy Giuliani has a hair dye malfunction, Trevor examines the pandemic's effects on Thanksgiving, and Bill Gates discusses COVID-19, climate change and his new podcast with Rashida Jones.
3505	November 30	Stephen Curry	Curry Brand	0.618
The Daily Social Distancing Show; Donald Trump advances cruel policies in the final days of his presidency, Dulce Sloan examines the economic costs of climate change, and Stephen Curry discusses the launch of Curry Brand.

=== December ===
No.	Original air date	Guest(s)	Promotion	U.S. viewers (millions)
3506	December 1	Ernest Cline & Rosie Perez	Cline, Ernest (24 November 2020). Ready Player Two. Random House Publishing. ISBN 978-1524761332. & The Flight Attendant	0.590
The Daily Social Distancing Show; President Trump raises $170 million for his Election Defense Fund, author Ernest Cline discusses Ready Player Two, and actor Rosie Perez talks about The Flight Attendant.
3507	December 2	Brit Bennett & Michael J. Fox	Bennett, Brit (2 June 2020). The Vanishing Half: A Novel. Penguin. ISBN 978-0525536291. & Fox, Michael J. (17 November 2020). No Time Like the Future: An Optimist Considers Mortality. Flatiron Books. ISBN 978-1250265616.	0.696
The Daily Social Distancing Show; Trevor and Roy Wood Jr. examine racial discrimination in housing, Brit Bennett discusses her novel The Vanishing Half, and Michael J. Fox talks about his memoir No Time Like the Future.
3508	December 3	Ludacris	KidNation	0.689
The Daily Social Distancing Show; Desi Lydic reacts to President Trump's potential pardons for his offspring, Roy Wood Jr. examines 2020's streaming media surge, and Ludacris discusses his educational initiative KidNation.
3509	December 7	Method Man	Power Book II: Ghost	0.661
The Daily Social Distancing Show; Trevor examines Georgia's high-stakes Senate runoff elections, Jaboukie Young-White takes a retrospective look at the year in music, and Method Man talks about Power Book II: Ghost.
3510	December 8	Ijeoma Oluo & Busta Rhymes	Oluo, Ijeoma (5 May 2020). Mediocre:The Dangerous Legacy of White Male America. Basic Books. ISBN 978-1580059510. & Extinction Level Event 2: The Wrath of God	0.575
The Daily Social Distancing Show; Ronny Chieng highlights major technology news from 2020, writer Ijeoma Oluo discusses her book Mediocre, and rapper Busta Rhymes talks about his album Extinction Level Event 2.
3511	December 9	George Wallace	Wallace, George (25 November 2020). Bulltwit...and Whatnot: The Online Ramblings of George Wallace. George Wallace. ISBN 978-0578655888.	0.756
The Daily Social Distancing Show; Michael Kosta proposes denying 2020 ever happened, Desi Lydic examines the year's rise in horniness, and comedian George Wallace talks about his book Bulltwit...and Whatnot.
3512	December 10	Rachel Maddow & Bryan Cranston	Maddow, Rachel; Yarvitz, Michael (8 December 2020). Bag Man: The Wild Crimes, Audacious Cover-up, and Spectacular Downfall of a Brazen Crook in the White House. Crown. ISBN 978-0593136683. & Your Honor	0.623
The Daily Social Distancing Show; Dulce Sloan looks back at protesting in 2020, MSNBC's Rachel Maddow talks about her book Bag Man, and actor Bryan Cranston discusses his role on the Showtime series Your Honor.
3513	December 14	Pharrell Williams	N/A	0.550
The Daily Social Distancing Show; President Trump gets a reality check, Desi Lydic and Roy Wood Jr. host a voter suppression game show, and Pharrell Williams discusses his Black Ambition initiative and the Juneteenth Pledge.
3514	December 15	Barack Obama	Obama, Barack (17 November 2020). A Promised Land. Crown. ISBN 978-1524763169.	0.686
The Daily Social Distancing Show; GOP leaders finally accept Joe Biden's presidential victory over Donald Trump, and Trevor talks to Barack Obama about his memoir A Promised Land, his leadership initiatives and more.
3515	December 16	James Corden & Tessa Thompson	The Late Late Show with James Corden & The Prom, and Sylvie's Love	0.695
The Daily Social Distancing Show; Desi Lydic braves a family Christmas party with relatives from Fox News, James Corden talks about The Late Late Show and The Prom, and Tessa Thompson discusses her movie Sylvie's Love.
