= Begin Again (book) =

2020 non-fiction book by Eddie S. Glaude Jr.

- Front cover
- Author: Eddie S. Glaude Jr.
- Language: English
- Publisher: Crown Publishing Group
- Publication date: June 30, 2020
- Publication place: United States
- Pages: 272
- ISBN: 9780525575320
- Dewey Decimal: 305.800973
- LC Class: E184.A1 G554 2020

Begin Again: James Baldwin's America and Its Urgent Lessons for Our Own is a 2020 book by Eddie S. Glaude Jr. Covering the life and works of American writer and activist James Baldwin, and the theme of racial inequality in the United States, Glaude uses these topics to discuss what he views as historical failed opportunities for America to "begin again". He analyzes Baldwin's activism and sexuality and his non-fiction writings, perceiving a shift in his later works. Glaude uses ideas from Baldwin to comment on contemporary racial topics such as the Black Lives Matter movement, which began in 2013.

The book entered The New York Times Best Seller list on July 19, 2020, and has received positive critical reception.

== Background ==
Author Eddie S. Glaude Jr. is the chair of the Department of African American Studies at Princeton University. The book follows his 2016 work Democracy in Black, about racism in contemporary America, in which Glaude argued that black people had largely suffered under the Obama administration. Begin Again is largely about the American writer and activist James Baldwin, who Glaude first read in graduate school. Glaude initially found his writings uncomfortable, particularly due to the reactions of his white classmates. He later returned to the works and studied them further. He eventually began teaching Baldwin at Princeton.

After the book was written, the May 2020 murder of George Floyd led to a global protest movement on the subject of institutional racism and police violence. The book was published on June 30, 2020, by Crown Publishing Group. Princeton's Undergraduate Student Government distributed free digital copies to students who requested it as part of their Anti-Racism Book Initiative, along with Princeton academic Imani Perry's book Breathe: A Letter to My Sons.

== Synopsis ==
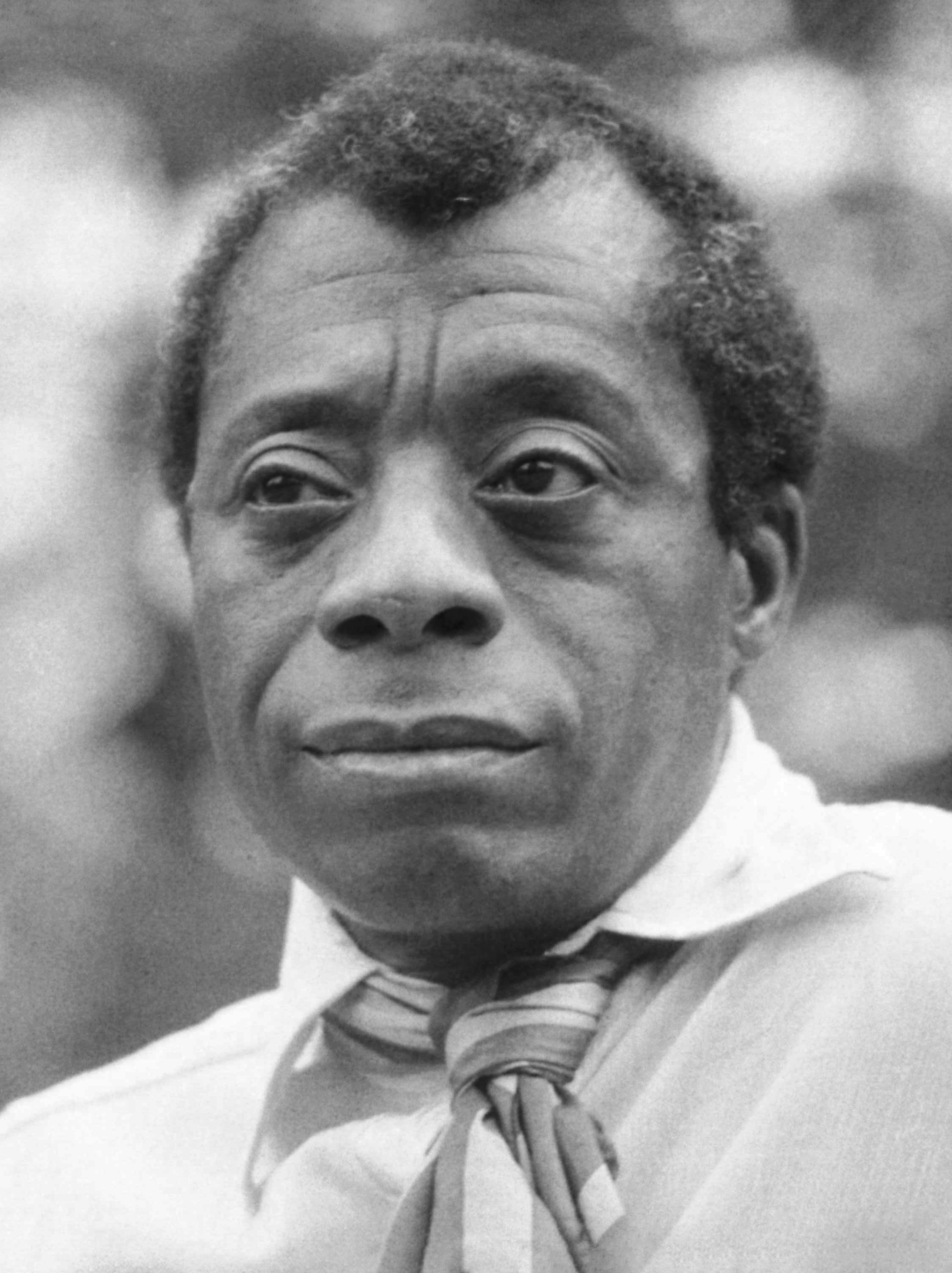
Begin Again covers much of the life and works of American writer James Baldwin.

The book spans genres including biography, memoir, history and literary analysis. Glaude says that Americans have had two failed opportunities to "begin again", a phrase taken from Baldwin's final novel Just Above My Head. The first was the "second founding" of America after the American Civil War and Reconstruction era. The second was the civil rights movement. He argues that a third opportunity is needed.

Glaude outlines Baldwin's early literary works. He argues that Baldwin's focus later changed from "white America" to the "well-being and future of black people". In 1963, a bombing took place at 16th Street Baptist Church, which Glaude believes led to Baldwin becoming disillusioned and his writing changing. Glaude mostly analyzes Baldwin's non-fiction, including his later books The Fire Next Time (1963) and No Name in the Street (1972), and the 1982 documentary I Heard It Through the Grapevine.

Glaude sees Baldwin as addressing "the lie", the idea that America has an underlying goodness, by calling for people to "bear witness". In No Name in the Street, Baldwin found that white liberals viewed racism as a matter of "hearts and minds" rather than systematic discrimination and rejected evidence of police brutality. Additionally, according to Glaude, the book is a work of experimentation and a piece of art; Glaude found it to be Baldwin's most significant work of social criticism. He says that though Baldwin's later works continued to be popular, he lost support from literary critics. He also discusses Baldwin's time in Istanbul after the assassination of Martin Luther King Jr., and writes that Baldwin's queerness made him "misfitted" amongst civil rights activists including King and Eldridge Cleaver.

Glaude argues that periods of American history have been similarly marked by movements for change being followed by movements to preserve the status quo. He says this began with the American Revolution and gives other examples including the 1981 election of Ronald Reagan and the war on drugs after the civil rights movement. More recently, he says that an instance of this is the 2016 election of Donald Trump as a reaction to Barack Obama's presidency. Glaude uses Baldwin's views on the Black Power movement and incarceration in the United States to make arguments about contemporary racial topics including the Black Lives Matter movement, the removal of Confederate monuments and memorials and identity politics.

== Reception ==
The book entered The New York Times Best Seller list in the Hardcover Nonfiction category on July 19, 2020, where it placed fifth. The book has been on the list for three weeks, as of the August 2 edition.

It won the 2021 Stowe Prize, awarded by the center that preserves Harriet Beecher Stowe's house.

=== Critical reception ===
In a starred review, Kirkus Reviews said that Glaude's writing is "eloquent and impassioned" and that he "effectively demonstrates how truth does not die with the one who spoke it". Thomas J. Davis of Library Journal summarized the book as being about "moral reckoning, owning up to failed choices, and making an effort to choose better ones". In a positive review, The New York Times' Jennifer Szalai summarized that "Glaude finds energy and even solace in the later nonfiction that charted Baldwin's disillusionment". Claire Howorth of Vanity Fair praised the book as "a hopeful and honest treatise" which showed "deep engagement with Baldwin's work".

Publishers Weekly found Glaude "perceptive" and to make "an effective and impassioned case", though writing that "Glaude at times seems to be trying to fit three books into one". Kenneth W. Mack of The Washington Post similarly said that Begin Again is "in fact, two different books", and asked a question which he thought the book did not answer, "If we are in the after times, then what was the before?". However, Mack found it a "groundbreaking and informative guide to Baldwin and his era".

In a review for East Village Magazine, Robert Thomas wrote: "Glaude's review of those times and their lessons through Baldwin's dark and hopeful message is prescient to our current challenge to democracy."
