= Janet Hanson =

American financier

- Education: Wheaton College; Columbia Business School
- Occupations: Financier, business executive
- Employer(s): Goldman Sachs; Lehman Brothers
- Known for: Founder of 85 Broads

Janet Hanson is an American financier and the founder of 85 Broads, a global network community of 30,000 women. In 1986 she became the first woman to be promoted to sales management of Goldman Sachs.

== Early life and education ==
Hanson graduated from Wheaton College and Columbia Business School.

== Career ==
Hanson joined Goldman Sachs in 1977 and remain for 14 years. She then founded Milestone Capital, a money market fund company managing over $2 billion in assets.

After recovering from a serious health issue in 2002, Hanson became a Managing Director and Senior Advisor to the President & COO of Lehman Brothers.

=== 85 Broads ===
Hanson founded 85 Broads to stay in touch with women at Goldman Sachs. After an investment of about $5 million, the network evolved to include women from other companies, professions and countries to have about 30,000 members in 2014. In 2013, 85 Broads was acquired by Sallie Krawcheck. In 2006, she led a project to write More than 85 Broads, a book co-written with other 85 Broads members offering advice and career histories.

== Board memberships ==
Hanson is a member of the Forbes Executive Women’s Board and of the Kellogg Center for Executive Women’s Steering Committee. She is a former member of the Board of Trustees of Wheaton College (MA) and a board member of the Christopher and Dana Reeve Foundation. She is an Associate Fellow of Pierson College at Yale University and serves on the Advisory Board of the Center for Talent Innovation. She has received a number of awards, including an honorary degree from Middlebury College in 2007.

== Personal ==
Hanson has two children, Meredith and Christopher.
