= Nelson Makamo =

Nelson Makamo (February 1982) is a South African contemporary visual artist known for portraits often depicting rural South African children. Makamo has exhibited his work internationally, with notable solo shows in cities like Los Angeles, Paris, London, New York and in South Africa.

== Early years ==
Makamo was born in Modimolle, Limpopo, South Africa, in February 1982, and his fascination with drawing began in childhood. He studied at the Artist Proof Studio in Johannesburg, where he specialized in printmaking. This institution became a pivotal part of his journey, helping him develop a wide range of techniques, from charcoal sketches to oil and acrylic painting.

== Artistic style and themes ==
Makamo is widely known for his emotive and large-scale portraits, particularly of children, often using vibrant colors and expressive lines. His works are typically created with charcoal, oil paints, and acrylics, and they are celebrated for their depth, texture, and emotional resonance. His focus on children, particularly black children from rural South Africa, is central to his artistic vision.

Makamo was featured on Comedy Central's, The Daily Show by Trevor Noah in 2019.
