= Just Above My Head =

1979 novel by James Baldwin

- First edition
- Author: James Baldwin
- Language: English
- Genre: Novel
- Publisher: Dial Press
- Publication date: 1979
- Publication place: United States
- Pages: 597
- ISBN: 0-8037-4777-2

Just Above My Head is James Baldwin's sixth and last novel, first published in 1979. He wrote it in his house in Saint-Paul-de-Vence, France.

== Plot introduction ==
The novel tells the life story of a group of friends, from preaching in Harlem, through to experiencing "incest, war, poverty, the civil-rights struggle, as well as wealth and love and fame—in Korea, Africa, Birmingham, New York City, Paris."

== Characters ==
- Arthur Montana, a gay man who becomes the world-famous "Emperor of Soul". He started out in a quartet, the Trumpets of Zion.
- Hall Montana, Arthur's brother, a married man in his forties.
- Ruth Granger, Hall's wife. Hall met her at a fundraiser.
- Paul Montana, Arthur and Hall's late father. He was born in Tallahassee, Florida, grew up in New Orleans, moved to California and finally to New York City.
- Florence Montana, Hall and Arthur's mother.
- Tony, Hall's son.
- Odessa, Hall's daughter.
- Faulkner, a masochistic white man Arthur knew.
- Crunch, Arthur's lover. He was a member of the Trumpets of Zion. His real name was Jason Hogan.
- Red, a member of the Trumpets of Zion. He has become a drug addict and been to prison several times.
- Lorna, Red's wife. She has left him, with their two sons.
- Peanut, a member of the Trumpets of Zion. He was later murdered.
- Jimmy, a neighbour of the Montanas when they were younger.
- Julia, Jimmy's sister.
- Brother Joel Miller, Julia's and Jimmy's father.
- Amy Miller, Julia's and Jimmy's mother. She dies shortly after a miscarriage.
- Reverend Parker, Julia's Evangelist reverend when she was younger.
- Mrs Bessie, a blind old black woman whom Julia took to the church when she was younger.
- Sidney, a bartender. He was brought up by his grandmother, who died recently.
- Martha, a young woman who works at the Harlem Hospital. She is Hall's ex-girlfriend. Her aunt, Josephine, is from the West Indies.
- Mr Clarence Webster, a black music teacher and impresario for the Trumpets of Zion.
- Sister Dorothy Green.
- Blanche, Hall's landlady.
- Faulkner Grey, a coworker of Hall's.
- Mrs Isabel Reed, a high school teacher from Richmond.
- Mr Reed, a lawyer from Tuscaloosa, Alabama.
- Reverend Williams, a preacher from Richmond.
- Mrs Elkins, a hostess in Atlanta, Georgia.
- Guy Lazar, a ginger-haired French man Arthur dates in Paris.

== Major themes ==
The novel enmeshes racism with homophobia, with an "explicit association of Birmingham and Sodom".

== Allusions to other works ==
- Julia is listening to Esther Phillips's From A Whisper To A Scream in Book I. Tony, erstwhile fan of James Brown, goes on to play Billy Preston. Later, Dinah Shore and Brook Benton are mentioned. At the Millers' at Christmas, they listen to Nat King Cole's "White Christmas" and Mahalia Jackson's "Silent Night". Ella Fitzgerald and Pearl Bailey are also playing in the bar. Julia is playing Miles Davis. Arthur mentions Billie Holiday, Bessie Smith, James Cleveland, Dizzy Gillespie, Charlie Parker, Marian Anderson, and Johannes Brahms. Guy owns records by Jelly Roll Morton, Ma Rainey, Django Reinhardt, Louis Armstrong, Duke Ellington, Ida Cox, and Fats Waller. Later, he mentions Josephine Baker, Charles Trenet, Edith Piaf, and Yves Montand.
- In her house, Julia is said to have the Bible, Foxe's Book of Martyrs and Jacqueline Susann's Valley of the Dolls. Later, Martha mentions Lewis Carroll's Alice in Wonderland. Enoch Arden and Irwin Shaw's The Girls in Their Summer Dresses is also mentioned. In Book Five, Henry James and Agatha Christie are mentioned.
- Frank Sinatra's song "One for My Baby (and One More for the Road)" is mentioned.
- Sister Dorothy Green is compared to Scarlett O'Hara in the 1939 film Gone With the Wind. Later, John Wayne is mentioned.
- Julia and Arthur go to the movies and see Sunset Boulevard starring William Holden and Gloria Swanson. On Hall's comeback from Korea, Yul Brynner is mentioned.
- The Wiz is mentioned at the outset of Book Five.

== Allusions to actual history ==
- The Emancipation Proclamation is mentioned with regards to Mrs Bessie.
- Hall criticises the American government for sending blacks to the Korean War.
- Benjamin Franklin and Crispus Attucks are mentioned.
- Marcus Garvey and the Jim Crow laws are mentioned. Later, J. Edgar Hoover, Francisco Franco and South Africa under apartheid are mentioned. Later, Arthur mentions Martin Luther King Jr. and Malcolm X, and later the March on Washington for Jobs and Freedom and John Brown. In Atlanta, the John Birch Society, the White Citizens' Council and James Eastland are mentioned.
- Guy says he was a French soldier in the Algerian War.

== Literary significance and criticism ==
It has been suggested that the novel links the trope of the internalization of history to what W. E. B. Du Bois defined as the African American's "longing to attain self-conscious manhood".

It has been suggested that Crunch subscribes to the idea propounded by Auguste Ambroise Tardieu and Cesare Lombroso that homosexuality was inscribed upon a homosexual's flesh, when he wonders, "if his change was visible".
