= Ellevest =

Fintech company for women

- Founded: 2014
- Founder: Sallie Krawcheck; Charlie Kroll
- Headquarters: New York City, New York, U.S.
- AUM: US$1 billion (2022)
- Website: www.ellevest.com

Ellevest is a wealth management and financial planning firm primarily for women. It was cofounded by Sallie Krawcheck and Charlie Kroll in 2014, with venture capital provided in part by Melinda Gates's Pivotal Ventures, Valerie Jarrett, and Eric Schmidt. As of 2025, it manages more than one billion dollars, about 90% of whom identify as women. Ellevest provides financial planning, as well as wealth management for individuals, families, and organizations. Its gender-aware investment approach takes into account that women often have longer lifespans than men, and thus may need to save or invest more money to account for a longer retirement period. The approach also factors in that women typically hit their salary peaks earlier in life than men and typically have lower salaries due to the gender pay gap. Ellevest also allows its users to financially plan for income breaks or decreases, which can be necessary due to having children or providing elder care.

In December 2024, founder Sallie Krawcheck announced she was stepping down as CEO to focus on her health, transitioning to a board role. Sylvia Kwan, who also serves as Chief Investment Officer, replaced her as CEO.

In February 2025, Ellevest announced that Betterment (company) would acquire its automated investing accounts. As a result of the deal and shift in direction, Ellevest now exclusively serves high-net-worth clients.
