= Ellevate Network =

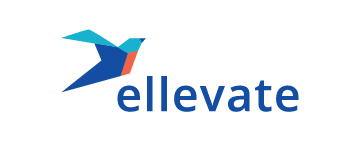
- Formation: 1997
- Founder: Janet Hanson
- Type: Professional association
- Purpose: Women in the workforce, Gender equality
- Headquarters: New York, NY
- CEO: Anusha Harid-Paoletti
- Website: ellevatenetwork.com
- Formerly called: 85 Broads Unlimited, LLC

Ellevate Network is a global professional association focused on gender equality in the workplace. Founded in 1997, it initially aimed to connect women in finance and has since expanded to include members across multiple industries.

As of January 2024, the organization reported over 280,000 members worldwide and more than 40 chapters, primarily in the United States, with additional locations in Dubai, London, Madrid, and Toronto.

== History ==
The organization was originally founded as 85 Broads by Janet Hanson, a former Goldman Sachs employee, as a network for women who had left the firm. The name derived from the address of Goldman Sach's New York office.

Sallie Krawcheck, former head of global wealth management at Merrill Lynch, acquired 85 Broads Unlimited LLC in 2013 and rebranded the organization as Ellevate in 2014. Following the acquisition, Janet Hanson remained involved with the organization as chairman emeritus and as an advisor. The name "Ellevate" is derived from the French pronounelle meaning "she".

In late 2022, Allyson McDonald, an investor and former President of Ellevate Network, purchased the organization from Krawcheck. McDonald serves as the managing member and majority owner. Janet Hanson remains involved as a member of the advisory board. McDonald later announced the appointment of Anusha Harid-Paoletti as chief executive officer.

== Services ==
The organization offers programming including monthly roundtable discussions and events for its members. It also operates online programs and networking groups aimed at professional development. These services are targeted toward various groups, including early-career professionals, entrepreneurs, and senior executives.

== Partnerships ==
On March 21, 2016, Ellevate announced a partnership with American Corporate Partners, a mentoring program for women veterans. In 2014, Ellevate partnered with Pax World Management to establish the Pax Ellevate Global Women's Index Fund, which focuses on companies with significant representation of women leadership roles.
