= Leonard Krawcheck =

American politician

Member of the South Carolina House of Representatives from the Charleston County district
- In office 1967–1970

Personal details
- Born: January 20, 1941 (age 85) Charleston, South Carolina
- Party: Democratic
- Occupation: lawyer

Leonard Krawcheck (born January 20, 1941) was an American politician in the state of South Carolina. He served in the South Carolina House of Representatives from 1967 to 1970, representing Charleston County, South Carolina. He is a lawyer. He is Jewish.
