= Eddie Glaude =

American academic, writer, and pundit (born 1968)

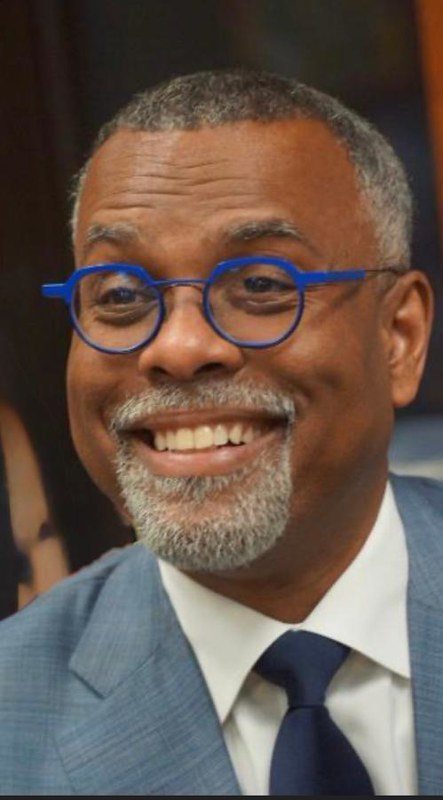
- Glaude in 2026
- Born: Eddie Steven Glaude Jr. September 4, 1968 (age 58); Moss Point, Mississippi, U.S.
- Occupations: Academic, writer, and pundit

Academic background
- Education: Morehouse College (BA); Temple University (MA); Princeton University (MA, PhD)

Academic work
- Institutions: Bowdoin College; Princeton University

Eddie Steven Glaude Jr. (born September 4, 1968) is an American academic, author, and pundit. He is James S. McDonnell Distinguished University Professor at Princeton University, where he teaches in the departments of African American studies and religion. At Princeton, Glaude was the inaugural department chair after the Princeton Center for African American Studies became an academic department in 2015; he led the program until stepping down in 2023.

Glaude teaches courses across the liberal arts disciplines and has been quoted in the media as a subject-matter expert on racial and religious identity politics in the United States. He has written and edited multiple books published by university presses, has contributed essays to Time, The Huffington Post, and The New York Times, and has appeared on NBC and MS NOW programs such as Morning Joe, Deadline: White House, and Meet the Press.

== Early life and education ==
Eddie S. Glaude Jr. was born in Moss Point, Mississippi, on September 4, 1968. His father served in the Vietnam War with the United States Navy before working for the United States Postal Service. Glaude's mother had left school in eighth grade after becoming pregnant. She worked as a cleaning supervisor at a shipyard. Eddie Glaude was raised in Moss Point alongside his sister and brother.

Glaude matriculated at Morehouse College in Atlanta, Georgia, at the age of 16, and received a bachelor's degree in political science in 1989. He then earned a master's degree in African American studies from Temple University and a master's degree and Doctor of Philosophy in religion from Princeton University. Glaude is a member of Morehouse's board of trustees.

== Career ==
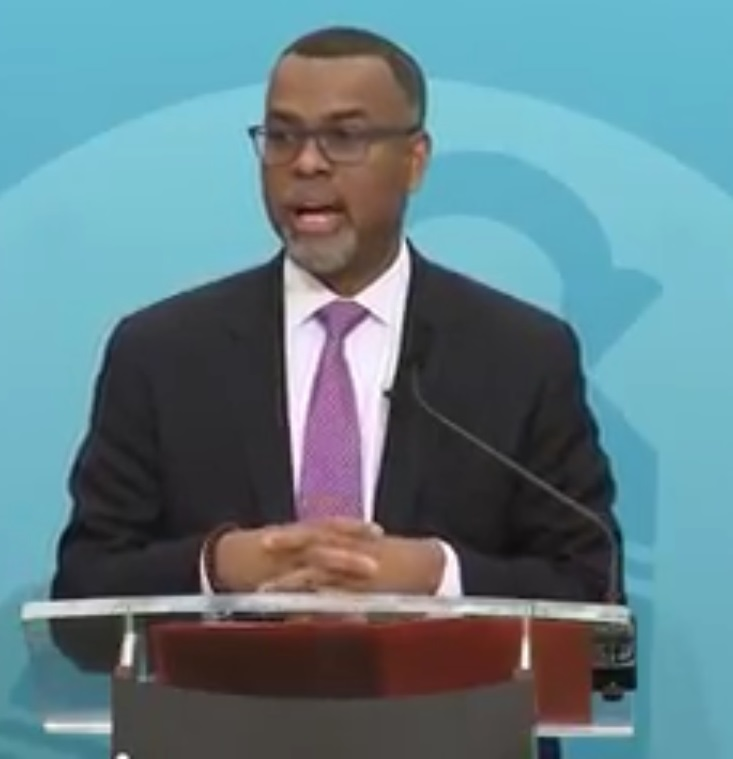
Glaude speaking to the City Club of Cleveland in February 2017

Glaude began his teaching career at Bowdoin College in Brunswick, Maine, amidst a time of growth in their Africana studies program. In 2002, Princeton University announced its plans to appoint Glaude as an associate professor; he joined the faculty that year.

At Princeton, Glaude was the chair of the Center for African American Studies from 2009 to 2015, and the inaugural chair of its successor, the Department of African American Studies, from 2015 to 2023. Since 2018, he has served as James S. McDonnell Distinguished University Professor of African American Studies, a professorship endowed by the James S. McDonnell Foundation.

In 2017, Glaude served as the president of the American Academy of Religion.

== Public intellectualism ==
Glaude has appeared on television programs, including Morning Joe, Deadline: White House, and Meet the Press. In his public appearances, he "[combines] a scholar's knowledge of history [and] a political commentator's take on the latest events".

In July 2016, Glaude published an article in Time entitled "My Democratic Problem with Voting for Hillary Clinton", in which he stated he would not be voting for Hillary Clinton in the 2016 United States presidential election. "I don't agree with her ideologically," he wrote, calling her a "corporate Democrat intent on maintaining the status quo". In a later interview, Glaude stated that he was "most closely aligned" with the campaign of Bernie Sanders.

In a June 2026 interview about his recently-released book, America, U.S.A.: How Race Shadows the Nation's Anniversaries, Glaude stated, "[Donald] Trump and Maga are literally destroying the foundations of our democracy right in front of us. We're witnessing the end of the America that made our lives possible."

== Personal life ==
Glaude is married to Winnifred Brown-Glaude, a professor of sociology and African American studies at The College of New Jersey who is of Jamaican heritage from Kingston, Jamaica. They have one child, a son named Langston Ellis Glaude, who graduated from Brown University, where he majored in Africana studies.

== Works ==
- America, U.S.A.: How Race Shadows the Nation's Anniversaries. Crown Publishing Group. May 26, 2026. ISBN 9780593239803.
- We Are the Leaders We Have Been Looking For. Harvard University Press. April 16, 2024. ISBN 9780674737600.
- Begin Again: James Baldwin's America and Its Urgent Lessons for Our Own. Crown/Archetype. June 30, 2020. ISBN 978-0-5255-7534-4.
- An Uncommon Faith: A Pragmatic Approach to the Study of African American Religion. The University of Georgia Press. 15 November 2018. ISBN 978-0-8203-5417-0
- Democracy in Black: How Race Still Enslaves the American Soul. Crown/Archetype. January 12, 2016. ISBN 978-0-8041-3742-3.
- Glaude, Eddie S. (2014). African American Religion: A Very Short Introduction. Oxford University Press. ISBN 978-0-19-518289-7. OCLC 904269477.
- In a Shade of Blue: Pragmatism and the Politics of Black America (Large Print 16pt). ReadHowYouWant.com. October 21, 2010. pp. 307–. ISBN 978-1-4596-0613-5.
- Cornel West; Eddie S. Glaude, eds. (2003). African American Religious Thought: An Anthology. Westminster John Knox Press. ISBN 978-0-664-22459-2.
- Eddie S. Glaude, ed. (April 15, 2002). Is It Nation Time?: Contemporary Essays on Black Power and Black Nationalism. University of Chicago Press. ISBN 978-0-226-29822-1.
- Exodus!: Religion, Race, and Nation in Early Nineteenth-Century Black America. University of Chicago Press. March 15, 2000. ISBN 978-0-226-29820-7.
