= Sallie Krawcheck =

American business executive (born 1964)

Sallie L. Krawcheck
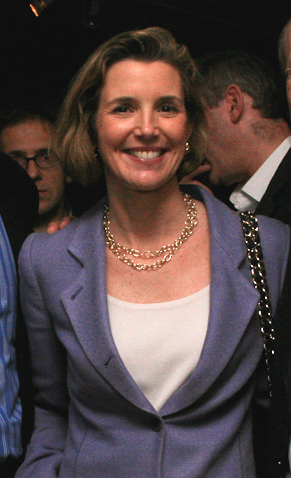
- Krawcheck in 2012
- Born: November 28, 1964 (age 61); New Orleans, Louisiana, US
- Education: University of North Carolina at Chapel Hill (B.A.); Columbia University (M.B.A.)
- Known for: Ellevate Network
- Title: Co-founder and CEO, Ellevest
- Term: 2015-
- Spouse: Gary Appel
- Children: 2
- Father: Leonard Krawcheck

Sallie L. Krawcheck (born November 28, 1964) is an American business executive who is the founder and former CEO of Ellevest, an investing platform for women launched in 2016. She was previously head of Bank of America's Global Wealth and Investment Management division. She has been called "the most powerful woman on Wall Street."

== Early life and education ==
Born in New Orleans, Louisiana, to former South Carolina House of Representative Leonard Krawcheck, Sallie grew up in Charleston, South Carolina. She has described her childhood as "half Jewish, half WASP-y". She attended the Porter-Gaud School. While in high school, she participated on the school's track and field team. In 1983, as a high school senior, she was honored as a South Carolina Presidential Scholar.

She received a Morehead Scholarship to the University of North Carolina at Chapel Hill, and graduated with a degree in journalism.

In 1992, she obtained an MBA from Columbia Business School.

== Career ==
=== Sanford C. Bernstein ===
Krawcheck started her career as equity analyst covering Wall Street firms, rising to become director of research and then chairman and CEO of sell-side research firm Sanford C. Bernstein & Co. She had a reputation for impartial advice and her decision to take Bernstein out of the lucrative, but conflicted underwriting business, caused Fortune to dub her "The Last Honest Analyst." Citigroup sought her out to deal with criticisms over conflicts of interest within its wealth management and research business after charges were brought against the company by Eliot Spitzer.

=== Citigroup ===
Krawcheck was named CEO of Citigroup's (then new) Smith Barney unit, for which she was named to Time's 2002 list of "Global Influentials" and Fortune's Most Influential Person Under the Age of 40. The Smith Barney unit was set up in order to separate Citigroup's investment banking from its stock brokering and research operations, to avoid the appearance of a conflict of interest in those areas. Krawcheck was put in charge of 13,000 brokers and analysts of the new retail brokerage division.

In 2004, Krawcheck was appointed chief financial officer for Citigroup.

In 2007, Krawcheck was named CEO of Citi's wealth management business, which included returning to Smith Barney and adding the Citi Private Bank. At the time of her arrival, the Private Bank had been thrown out of Japan for sales practice issues; this, combined with continuing Citi regulatory issues, resulted in financial advisor attrition that was at an all-time high. She worked to change the corporate culture for Smith Barney's financial advisors as an early advocate of a fiduciary standard for the brokerage industry.

Krawcheck left Citi on September 22, 2008, following months of tension with chief executive officer Vikram Pandit due to the fact that Krawcheck argued for Citi to reimburse clients for defective investments distributed by Citi wealth management's brokers and bankers. Pandit and other chief officers at Citi disagreed, arguing that Citi had no legal obligation in the matter.

=== Bank of America ===
Following the acquisition of Merrill Lynch in 2009, Bank of America hired Krawcheck to head the new division. Although Bank of America then-chief executive Ken Lewis had attempted to cancel the deal in the weeks before it closed, fearing Merrill Lynch was in worse financial condition than previously known, Krawcheck led the unit to $3.1 billion in profits during her two years as president of the wealth management unit. In the second quarter of 2011, Krawcheck's division increased net income by 54 percent, from $329 million to $506 million, while Bank of America posted an overall $8.8 billion loss.

Krawcheck's position at Merrill was eliminated by the firm's new chief executive, Brian Moynihan, as part of restructuring, and Krawcheck left Bank of America on September 6, 2011. She received severance payments of $6 million.

=== Ellevate Network ===
Krawcheck acquired 85 Broads Unlimited LLC. (which is now doing business as Ellevate Network) in 2013 and is now the chairwoman of the organization.

=== Ellevest ===
Krawcheck is the co-founder and CEO of Ellevest, a digital investment platform for women. Ellevest's goal is to work to close the gender investing gap in the U.S. by "redefining investing for women."

== Recognition ==
Krawcheck appeared in the top ten Forbes list of The World's 100 Most Powerful Women in 2005 and 2006. In 2008, she was named to Investment Advisor magazine's IA 25, the list of the 25 most influential people in and around the investment advisory business. She was recognized by the World Economic Forum as one of its Young Global Leaders. In 2012, she was credited by The Daily Beast as remaining one of the "rare honest voices on Wall Street." In December 2017, she was listed in a TechCrunch feature on 42 women succeeding in tech that year.

Krawcheck established a needs-based scholarship at her former secondary school, Porter-Gaud, awarding full tuition to students of exceptional aptitude.

== Personal life ==
Krawcheck is married to financier Gary Appel, with whom she has a son and a daughter.
