= List of Harlem Hit Parade number ones of 1944 =

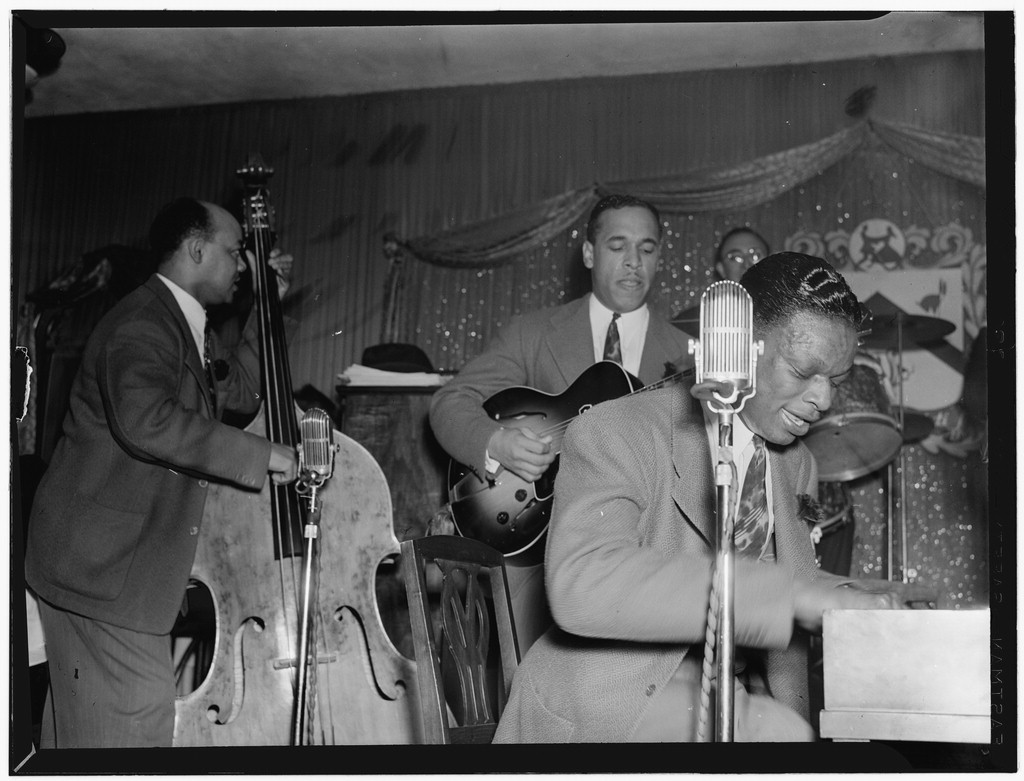
Nat King Cole (right) led his trio to two chart-toppers.

In 1944, Billboard magazine published a chart ranking the "most popular records in Harlem" under the title of the Harlem Hit Parade. Placings were based on a survey of record stores primarily in the Harlem district of New York City, an area that has historically been noted for its African American population and called the "black capital of America". The chart is considered to be the start of the lineage of the magazine's multimetric R&B chart, which since 2005 has been published under the title Hot R&B/Hip Hop Songs.

Most of 1944's number ones were in the jazz and swing genres, which were among the most popular styles of music in the early 1940s. Four acts achieved more than one chart-topper during the year: Louis Jordan and his Tympany Five with "Ration Blues" and "G.I. Jive", Duke Ellington and his Famous Orchestra with "Do Nothing till You Hear from Me" and "Main Stem", the Ink Spots and Ella Fitzgerald with "Cow-Cow Boogie (Cuma-Ti-Yi-Yi-Ay)" and "Into Each Life Some Rain Must Fall", and the King Cole Trio with "Straighten Up and Fly Right" and "Gee, Baby, Ain't I Good to You". Jordan's version of "G.I. Jive" was the second recording of the song to top the chart in 1944, following a rendition by Johnny Mercer with Paul Weston and his Orchestra earlier in the year. It was the most successful of many songs released during World War II which bemoaned life in the army. Jordan was by far the most successful artist of the 1940s on Billboard's R&B charts. His tally of 18 chart-toppers was a record which would stand until the 1980s, and he spent 113 weeks at number one,^{[a]} a record which would still stand in the 21st century. His jump blues style was also a major influence on the later development of rock and roll. The King Cole Trio had the highest total number of weeks at number one in 1944, spending 14 weeks in the top spot; pianist and vocalist Nat King Cole would soon move on from the jazz field to become a hugely successful pop artist.

Two of 1944's Harlem Hit Parade number ones had sufficient crossover appeal to also top Billboard's all-genres Most Played Juke Box Records chart: Jordan's version of "G.I. Jive" in July and "Into Each Life Some Rain Must Fall" by Fitzgerald and the Ink Spots in December. Two others topped the Most Played Juke Box Folk Records chart, which was first published in the issue of Billboard dated January 8 and covered "Hillbillies, Spirituals, Cowboy Songs, etc"; the latter chart is considered to be the start of the lineage of the magazine's country music chart. "Ration Blues" by Jordan topped the Harlem chart in the issue of Billboard dated January 1 and the Folk chart eight weeks later. "Straighten Up and Fly Right" by the King Cole Trio topped both listings simultaneously in June. "Into Each Life Some Rain Must Fall" was the year's final Harlem chart-topper, spending the last five weeks of 1944 at number one.

== Chart history ==
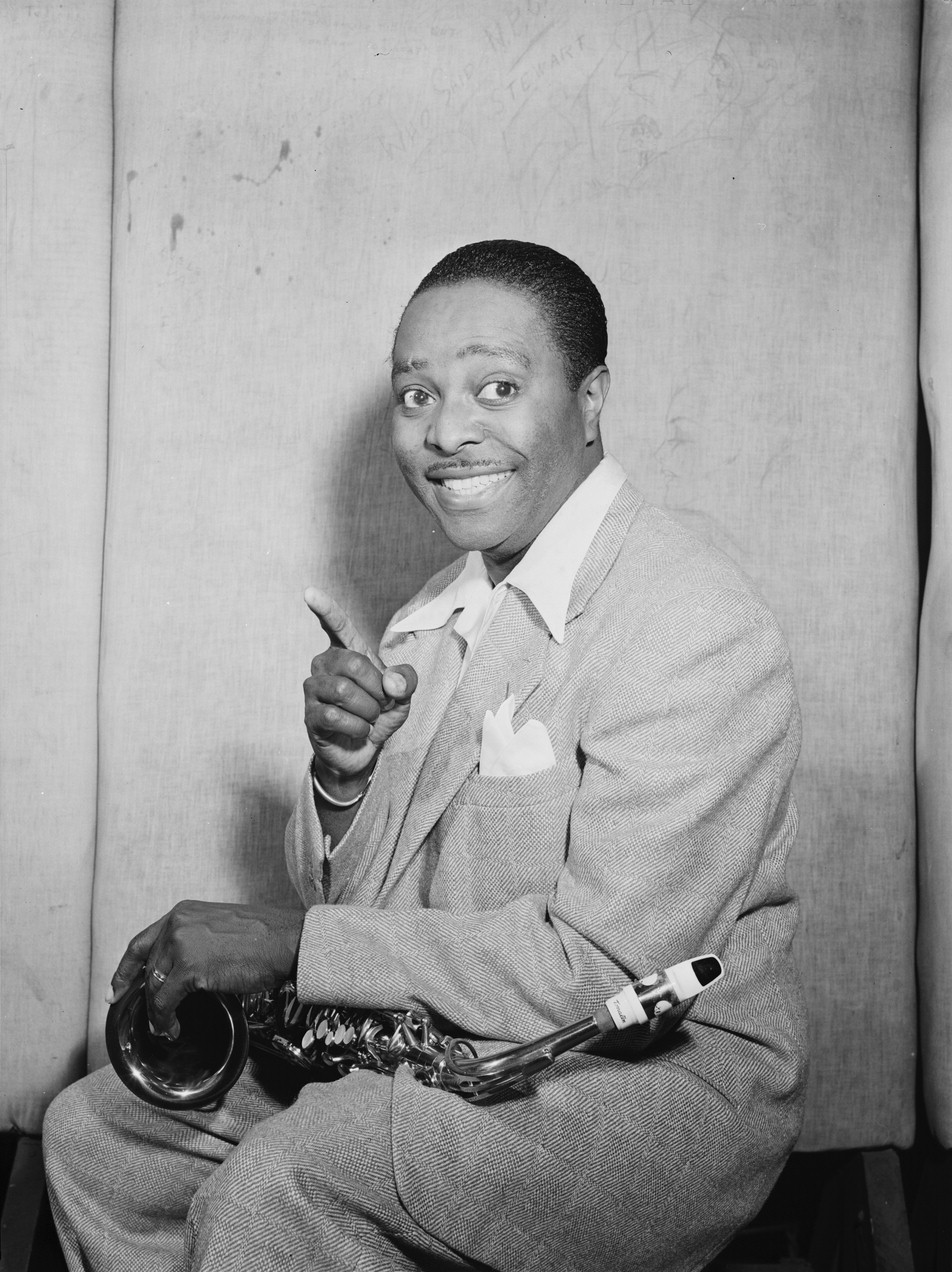
"Ration Blues" by Louis Jordan also reached number one on the new Most Played Juke Box Folk Records chart.

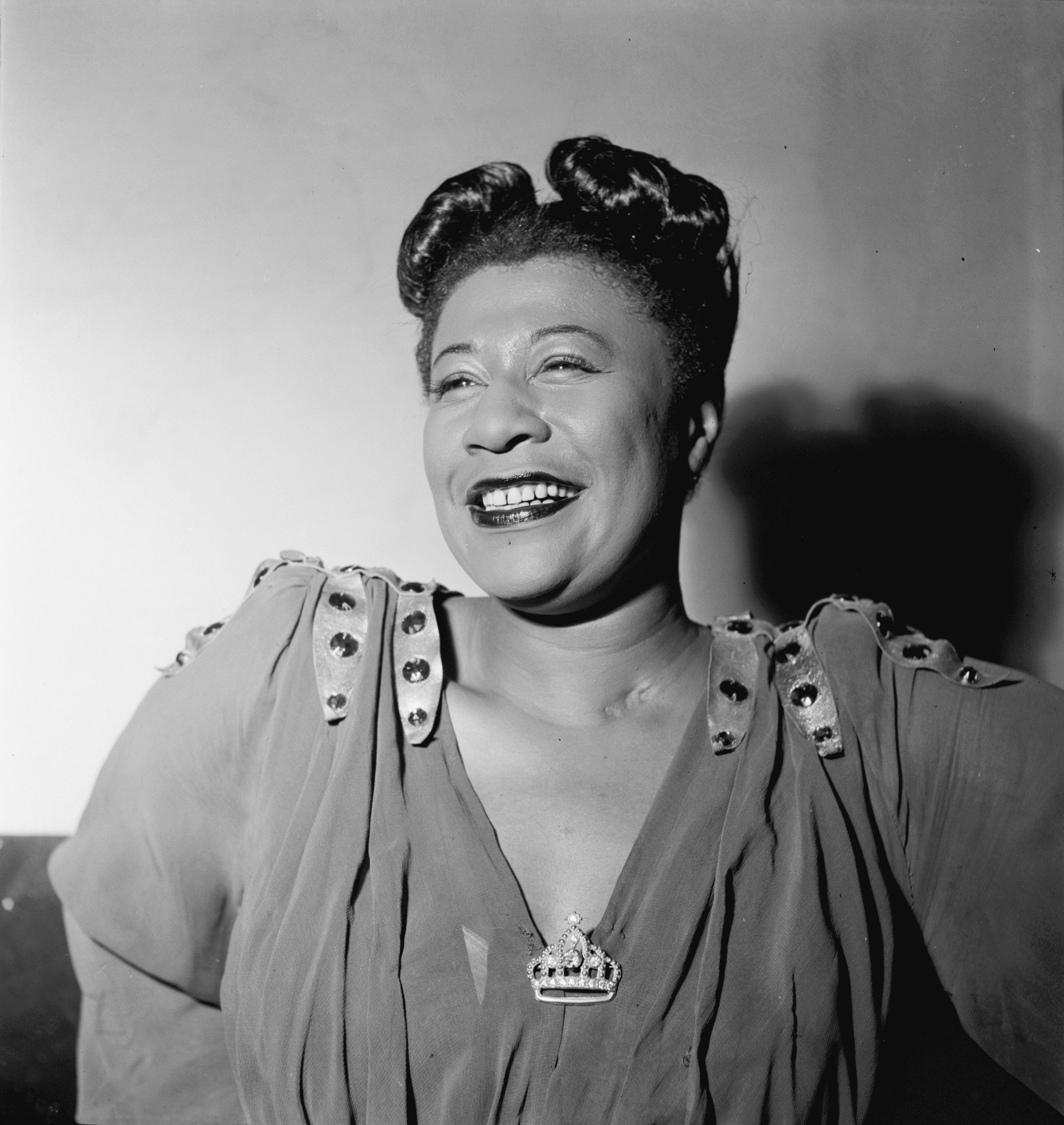
Ella Fitzgerald collaborated with the Ink Spots on two number ones.

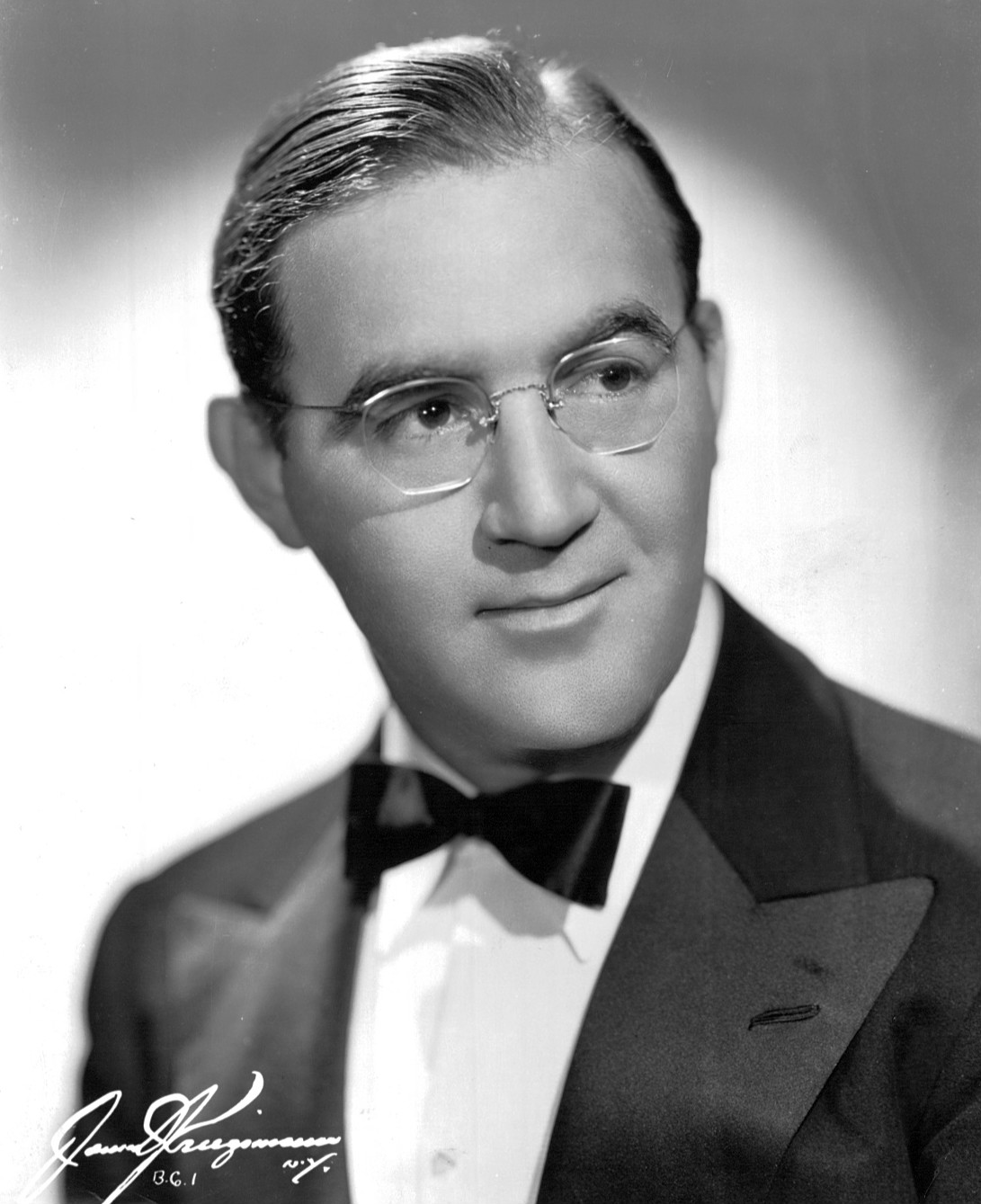
Benny Goodman and his Orchestra topped the chart with "Solo Flight".

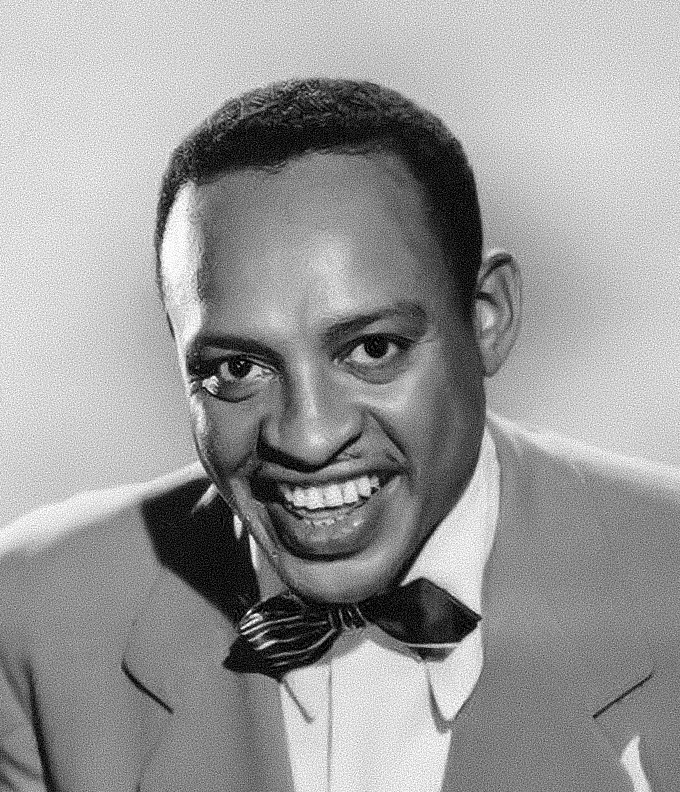
Lionel Hampton and his Orchestra took "Hamp's Boogie Woogie" to the top of the chart.

Chart history
Issue date	Title	Artist(s)	Ref.
January 1	"Ration Blues"	Louis Jordan and his Tympany Five	
January 8	"Shoo-Shoo Baby"	Ella Mae Morse	
January 15	"Do Nothing till You Hear from Me"	Duke Ellington and his Famous Orchestra	
January 22	"G.I. Jive"	Johnny Mercer with Paul Weston and his Orchestra	
January 29	"Do Nothing till You Hear from Me"	Duke Ellington and his Famous Orchestra	
February 5	"Do Nothing till You Hear from Me"	Duke Ellington and his Famous Orchestra	
February 12	"Do Nothing till You Hear from Me"	Duke Ellington and his Famous Orchestra	
February 19	"Do Nothing till You Hear from Me"	Duke Ellington and his Famous Orchestra	
February 26	"Do Nothing till You Hear from Me"	Duke Ellington and his Famous Orchestra	
March 4	"Do Nothing till You Hear from Me"	Duke Ellington and his Famous Orchestra	
March 11	"Solo Flight"	Benny Goodman and his Orchestra	
March 18	"Do Nothing till You Hear from Me"	Duke Ellington and his Famous Orchestra	
March 25	"Cow-Cow Boogie (Cuma-Ti-Yi-Yi-Ay)"	The Ink Spots and Ella Fitzgerald	
April 1	"Main Stem"	Duke Ellington and his Famous Orchestra	
April 8	"Main Stem"	Duke Ellington and his Famous Orchestra	
April 15	"When My Man Comes Home"	Buddy Johnson and his Band	
April 22	"Main Stem"	Duke Ellington and his Famous Orchestra	
April 29	"Straighten Up and Fly Right"	King Cole Trio	
May 6	"Main Stem"	Duke Ellington and his Famous Orchestra	
May 13	"Straighten Up and Fly Right"	King Cole Trio	
May 20	"Straighten Up and Fly Right"	King Cole Trio	
May 27	"Straighten Up and Fly Right"	King Cole Trio	
June 3	"Straighten Up and Fly Right"	King Cole Trio	
June 10	"Straighten Up and Fly Right"	King Cole Trio	
June 17	"Straighten Up and Fly Right"	King Cole Trio	
June 24	"Straighten Up and Fly Right"	King Cole Trio	
July 1	"Straighten Up and Fly Right"	King Cole Trio	
July 8	"Straighten Up and Fly Right"	King Cole Trio	
July 15	"G.I. Jive"	Louis Jordan and his Tympany Five	
July 22	"G.I. Jive"	Louis Jordan and his Tympany Five	
July 29	"G.I. Jive"	Louis Jordan and his Tympany Five	
August 5	"G.I. Jive"	Louis Jordan and his Tympany Five	
August 12	"G.I. Jive"	Louis Jordan and his Tympany Five	
August 19	"Till Then"	The Mills Brothers	
August 26	"G.I. Jive"	Louis Jordan and his Tympany Five	
September 2	"Hamp's Boogie Woogie"	Lionel Hampton and his Orchestra	
September 9	"Hamp's Boogie Woogie"	Lionel Hampton and his Orchestra	
September 16	"Hamp's Boogie Woogie"	Lionel Hampton and his Orchestra	
September 23	"Hamp's Boogie Woogie"	Lionel Hampton and his Orchestra	
September 30	"I'm Lost"	Benny Carter and his Orchestra	
October 7	"Hamp's Boogie Woogie"	Lionel Hampton and his Orchestra	
October 14	"I'm Lost"	Benny Carter and his Orchestra	
October 21	"Gee, Baby, Ain't I Good to You"	King Cole Trio	
October 28	"Gee, Baby, Ain't I Good to You"	King Cole Trio	
November 4	"Gee, Baby, Ain't I Good to You"	King Cole Trio	
November 11	"Gee, Baby, Ain't I Good to You"	King Cole Trio	
November 18	"Into Each Life Some Rain Must Fall"	The Ink Spots and Ella Fitzgerald	
November 25	"Hamp's Boogie Woogie"	Lionel Hampton and his Orchestra	
December 2	"Into Each Life Some Rain Must Fall"	The Ink Spots and Ella Fitzgerald	
December 9	"Into Each Life Some Rain Must Fall"	The Ink Spots and Ella Fitzgerald	
December 16	"Into Each Life Some Rain Must Fall"	The Ink Spots and Ella Fitzgerald	
December 23	"Into Each Life Some Rain Must Fall"	The Ink Spots and Ella Fitzgerald	
December 30	"Into Each Life Some Rain Must Fall"	The Ink Spots and Ella Fitzgerald	

== Notes ==
a. Jordan's first 16 number ones occurred at a time when Billboard published only one R&B chart. His final two number ones occurred during a period when the magazine published two charts and each topped both listings, but the figure of 113 weeks at number one does not double-count weeks when he topped both.
