= Going to Meet the Man =

1965 short story collection by James Baldwin

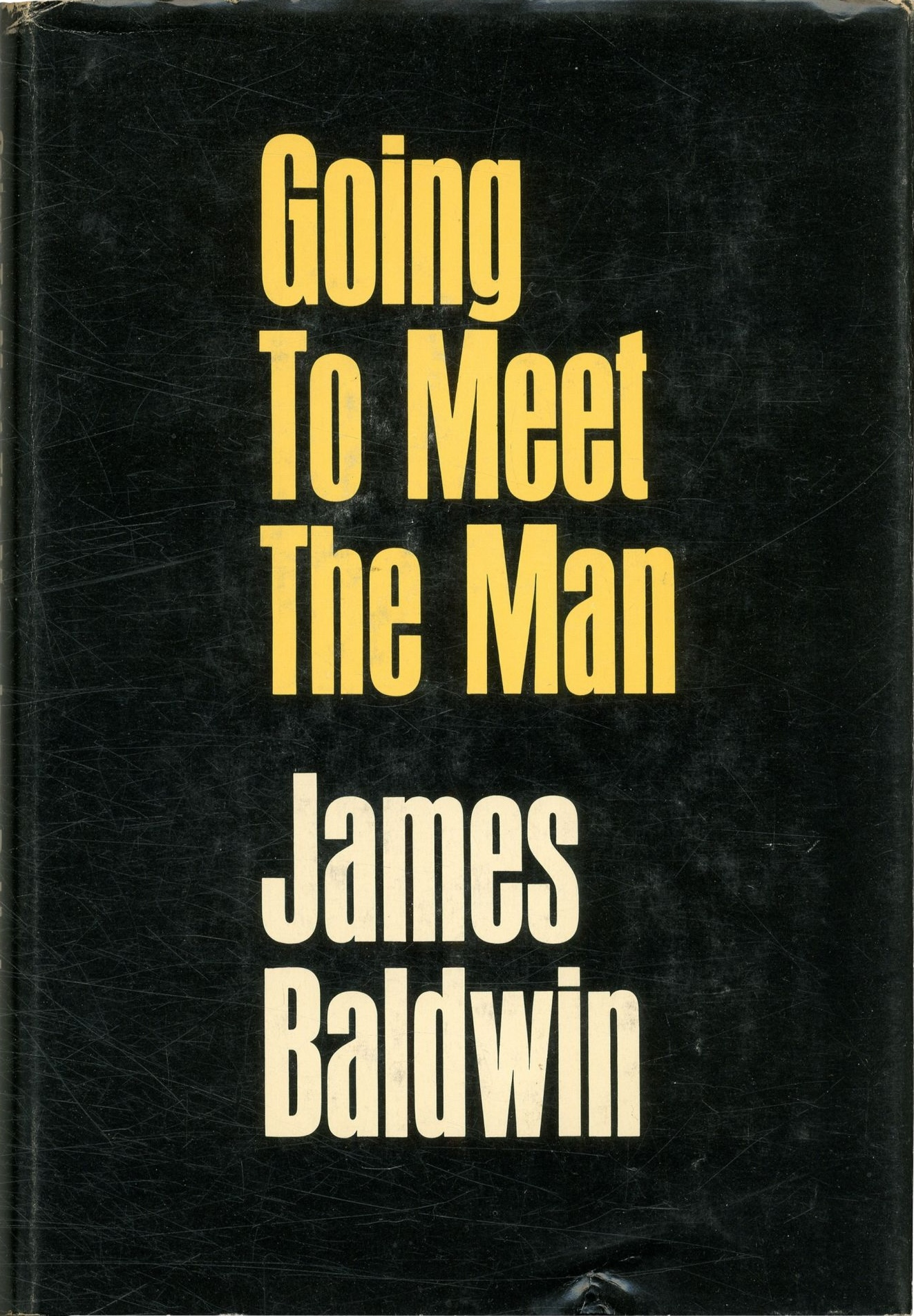
- First edition
- Author: James Baldwin
- Language: English
- Genre: Short stories
- Publisher: Dial Press
- Publication date: 1965
- Publication place: United States
- Media type: Print (hardcover and paperback)
- Pages: 249
- ISBN: 0718101685

Going to Meet the Man by James Baldwin is composed of eight short stories: "The Rockpile", "The Outing", "The Man Child", "Previous Condition", "Sonny's Blues", "This Morning, This Evening, So Soon", "Come Out the Wilderness", and "Going to Meet the Man". The stories follow the everyday lives of black men and women from the 1930s–50s, addressing themes of racism, sexuality, drug addiction, lynching, and more.

== "The Rockpile" ==
=== Context ===
James Baldwin himself is from Harlem and the step-son of a preacher, which transcends to the inspiration behind "The Rockpile". Much of Baldwin's work mirrors his own life experiences. As an example, Baldwin's step-father was a preacher, which compares to John's character in "The Rockpile" whose step-father is also a preacher.

=== Summary ===
"The Rockpile" was Baldwin's first story in the Going to Meet the Man collection, originally published in 1965. Set in Harlem, the story follows two brothers: Roy, the son of Elizabeth and Gabriel, and John, the illegitimate son of Elizabeth and step-son to Gabriel. Across the street from their apartment sits a rockpile, a forbidden object for John and Roy to play on, but Roy decides to go anyway, instructing his brother that he will be right back. There he gets into a fight, leaving him injured. He is brought back into the house and as the father, Gabriel gets home, he tries to blame Elizabeth and John for allowing Roy to go there. He favors Roy because he is his biological son, while John, his stepson, serves as the scapegoat.

=== Characters ===
The characters are the same as in Baldwin's autobiographical debut novel, Go Tell It on the Mountain.

- Elizabeth Grimes: John and Roy's mother
- Gabriel Grimes: Roy's father, John's step-father, and preacher
- Roy Grimes: Elizabeth and Gabriel's son, gets hurt on rockpile
- John Grimes: Elizabeth's illegitimate elder son, Gabriel's step-son, and born out of wedlock.
- Delilah Grimes: Elizabeth and Gabriel's daughter
- Paul Grimes: Elizabeth and Gabriel's son
- Sister McCandless
- Richard, a boy who drowned in the Bronx River.
- Aunt Florence: Gabriel's sister, lives in the Bronx.

=== Theme(s) ===
Favoritism in Black fatherhood

- Since John is not Gabriel's biological son, Gabriel plays favoritism towards Roy, revealing the theme of black fatherhood as well. Gabriel subconsciously acknowledges the importance of his lineage when Roy is injured, causing Gabriel to see a potential threat to his legacy. When Gabriel gets home and sees that Roy is hurt, he immediately casts blame on Elizabeth and her illegitimate son, John.

Alienation and neglect

- John is the illegitimate son of Elizabeth and Gabriel resents her for it. Because of this, when fatherhood is brought into play for Gabriel, he disregards John due to the fact that he is not his biological son. With Gabriel's immediate blame on John for Roy getting injured, there is a "rejection of John and protection of Roy."

=== Symbolism ===
Rockpile

- While the rockpile is a physical bolder, the boys of the neighborhood use it as a battle ground for a "game of king of the mountain." Since the boys are racially and economically disenfranchised, the rockpile symbolizes the struggle for ownership since they nor their fathers will never own the rockpile.

Blood

- Blood, specifically "black blood" plays a crucial role in Gabriel's favoritism toward Roy because the blood is passed down from black father to black son, symbolizing the "irreplaceable marker of Gabriel's paternity." The blood also represents a masculine inheritance as Gabriel dismisses Elizabeth, the mother, from the equation because of her sinful nature and "bastard son."

== "The Outing" ==
=== Context ===
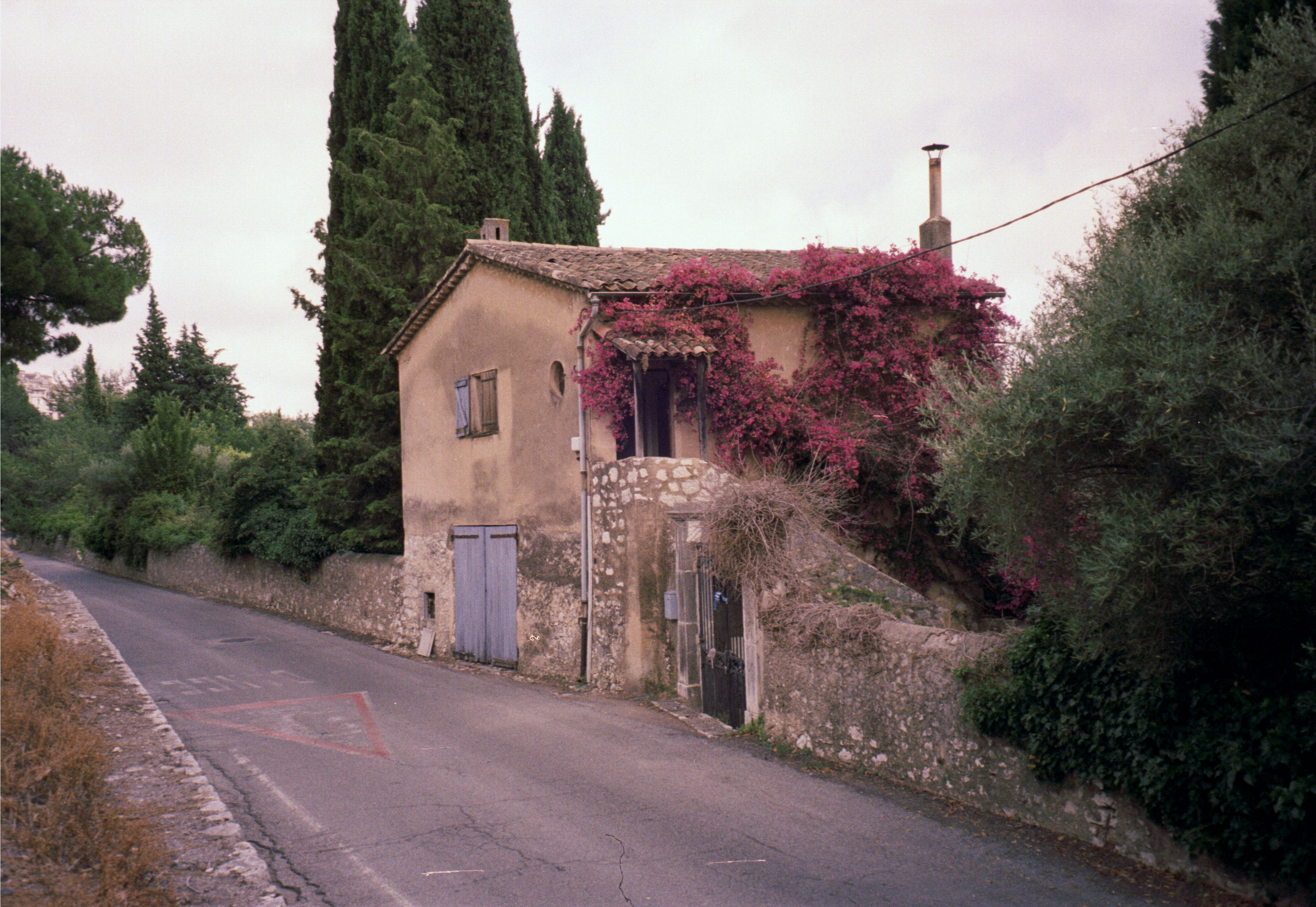
Baldwin's residence in St. Paul de Vence in France where he lived with Lucien Happersberger.

Published in 1951, "The Outing" touched on topics of homosexuality which were not widely accepted at the time. In the same year its publication, Baldwin was a queer male during this time, living with his partner, Lucien Happersberger.

=== Summary ===
"The Outing" is the second short story in the Going to Meet the Man collection, featuring characters John, Roy, Gabriel, and Elizabeth from "The Rockpile." John and Roy's father, Gabriel, is the deacon of the church, and they travel as a family to the annual church outing. Typically, this outing takes place at a park, but this year, it happens to be a boat trip up the Hudson River to Bear Mountain on the Fourth of July. While on the boat, Roy, Johnnie, and David, Johnnie's friend, take an interest in Sylvia, daughter of Sister Daniels and member of the church. In the midst of getting acquainted, Johnnie's father, Gabriel, tells him to be good, and Johnnie replies that he need not reprimand him. Johnnie, feeling worked up from the interactions with Gabriel decides to take a seat on the deck where David finds him shaking. Johnnie welcomes David's embrace and also tells him that he loves him. Upon arriving to Bear Mountain, Roy and David await the perfect time to give their gift to Sylvia, an action that makes Johnnie insecure and retreating to be alone. Eventually, they give Sylvia the gift and David goes to find Johnnie who is alone again and similar to their first time together, they embrace each other.

=== Characters ===
- Gabriel Grimes: Roy's father, Johnnie's step-father, and preacher
- Roy Grimes: Gabriel's son and Johnnie's younger brother
- Johnnie or John Grimes: Elizabeth's illegitimate elder son, Gabriel's step-son, and born out of wedlock.
- Elizabeth Grimes: Johnnie and Roy's mother (unnamed in this short story)
- Father James: authority figure in the church
- Lois: Johnnie's nine-year-old sister.
- Mrs. Jackson: David and Lorraine's mother.
- David Jackson: Johnnie's friend and potential love interest
- Lorraine: David's elder sister
- Sister McCandless: neighbor and friend of Elizabeth
- Sylvia: daughter of Sister Daniels and potential love interest for David
- Sister Daniels: Sylvia's mother
- Brother Elisha: member of the church
- Reverend Peters: member of the church

=== Theme(s) ===
Homoeroticism

- While Johnnie and David are friends, they share an intimate moment with each other when David pulls Johnnie in for an embrace multiple times while Johnnie tells him that he loves him.

Religion

- Given Gabriel's job as a deacon and invested member of the church, religion is important to him and something that he wants to pass down to Roy and Johnnie. The short story also touches on the loss of religion across generations and how younger children grow uninterested. An example of this is shown in David and Roy's interest in Sylvia on the trip instead of religion.

=== Symbolism ===
Traveling up the river

- Commentary on Joseph Conrad's Heart of Darkness, where the Black saints annually travel to witness the works and power of the Lord.

Title: "The Outing"

- Not only does the title of this short story represent the trip that the congregation is taking, it also represents Johnnie's personal journey navigating his sexuality. Johnnie has a "homosexual outing" as he grapples with his feelings toward David.

=== Reception ===
- Jerome de Romanet states that there is a "spiritual homo-eroticism" found in "The Outing" that is "philosophically unsettling."

== "The Man Child" ==
=== Summary ===
"The Man Child," the third story in Baldwin's Going to Meet the Man collection was published in 1965. Set in rural town, the story follows an all-white cast, Eric, and eight-year-old boy who lives on a large farm with his parents, who are friends with Jamie, a farmer who has lost his farm to Eric's father. It is Jamie's thirty-fourth birthday, and he is at Eric's parents' place to celebrate. Eric's father scolds Jamie for being alone, with no wife or children, only a dog and his mother and acting like a child. After dinner, Eric and his father go for a walk, during which Eric learns that all the land around him is his, and should be passed down from generation to generation. Jamie, on the other hand, has lost his land, and the land of Eric's father has grown even larger because he bought Jamie's. Concurrently, back at the house, Jamie blows out his birthday candles. Later in the story, after Eric's mother had a miscarriage, Eric goes to wash his hands at the outdoor pump and runs into Jamie. Jamies lures Eric into the barn by claiming that his father would be in there but he was not. Consequently, Jamie begins to strangle him, in which Eric starts pleading for his life but his efforts are not enough. Jamie breaks his neck as a result of strangulation and retreats to his home with his dog.

=== Characters ===
- Eric: 8-year-old boy who lives on a farm with his parents
- Jamie: 34-year-old neighbor (man child that the title references) of Eric and his family who is a failed farmer who goes to The Rafters, a local bar, with Eric's father every night.
- Father (unnamed): Eric's father and purchaser of Jamie's land
- Mother (unnamed): Eric's mother
- Sophie: Eric's would-be little sister, buried in the church courtyard

=== Theme(s) ===
Masculine legacy and white-male ownership

- Throughout the short-story, Baldwin provides multiple depictions of the land that Eric will inherit along with Eric's father's insistence on keeping the land in the family. Eric's father puts his son on a pedestal when showing him the land and telling him that it belonged to him since his existence. Eric shares in this masculine legacy and ownership as he mimics his father overseeing the land.

Homosexuality

- At the dinner table during Eric's father's scolding of Jamie, the father questions Jamie's sexual abilities and Jamie's response implies that Eric and Jamie used to be romantically involved themselves.

=== Symbolism ===
Paternal failure in Jamie

- Jamie acts as a symbol and model for the failure of "white paternal legacy" due to his lack of land and no wife to reproduce children that will inherit his legacy.

=== Reception ===
- Matt Brim comments on Jamie's murderous actions toward Eric at the end of the novel by stating that it was Jamie's way of destroying the "hetero-normative white myth of racial purity."
- Stanley Kauffman, a critic, suggests that "The Man Child" is a throwback to O. E. Rolvaag's poetry in terms of overall tone. He claims that the tone follows an author who is entering unchartered territory with a "failure of imagination."

== "Previous Condition" ==
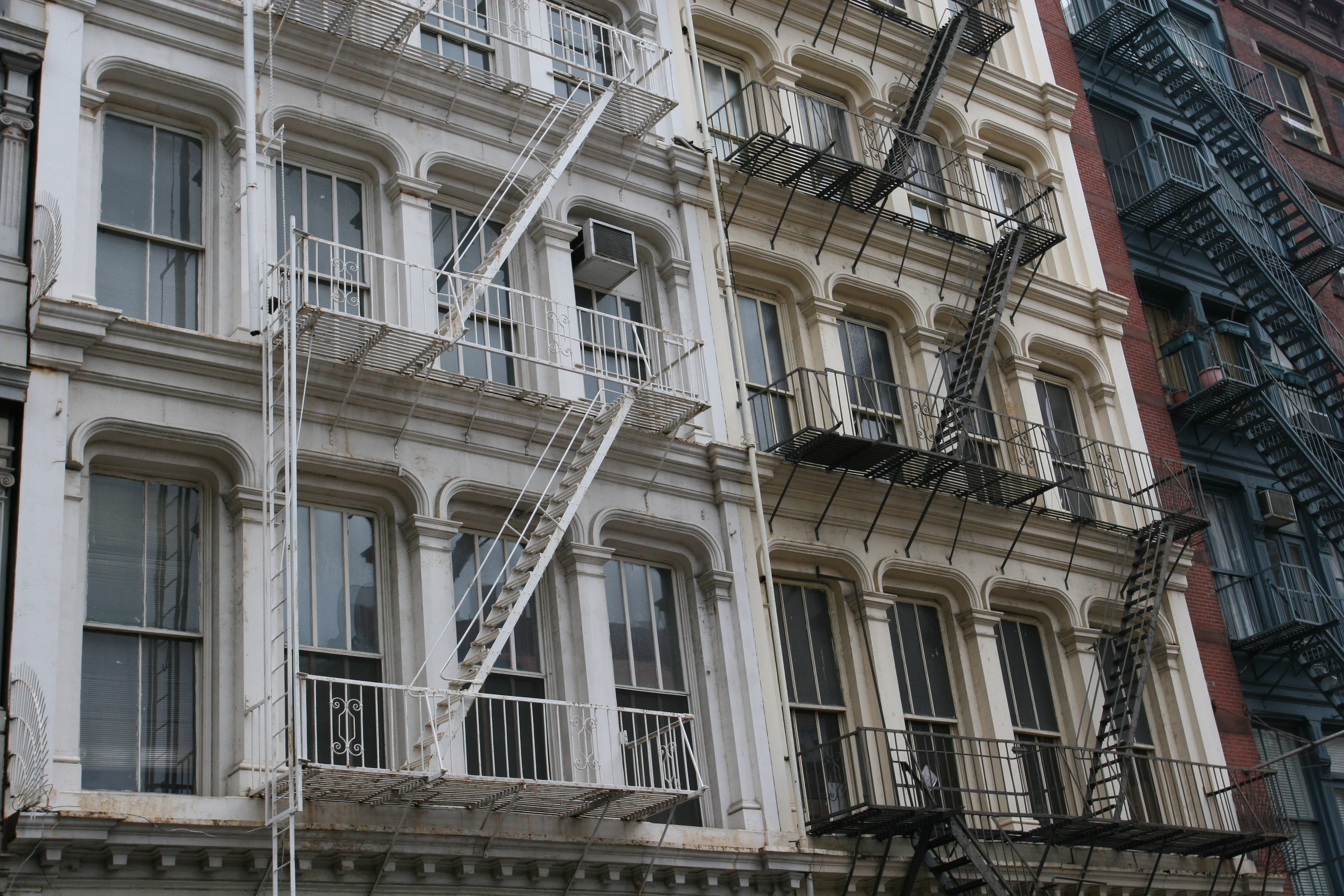
An example of the apartments in Greenwich Village where Peter was attempting to stay.

=== Summary ===
Originally published in 1948, "Previous Condition" was included in the publication of Going to Meet the Man in 1965 as the fourth short story featured. The story follows the narrator, Peter, an actor, who is living in a white neighborhood in New York City with his Jewish friend Jules who lets him stay in a room he is renting in a white neighborhood. Despite hiding, Peter is eventually found out by the other neighbors and the landlady. While living together, Jules and Peter engage in a long philosophical discussion about the nature of Blackness and Jewishness in America. Later, he goes to dinner with his friend Ida, who suggests suing the landlady, but he prefers not to, contributing to a disagreement between the two. He then leaves, takes the subway, and goes to a Black bar, where he buys a drink for two women.

=== Characters ===
- Peter: narrator-protagonist, actor, and Black man who stays with Jules and goes on a date with Ida
- Jules Weissman: Jewish boy who allows Peter to stay with him
- Ida: White girl of Irish descent, from Boston who Peter goes on a few dates with
- Landlady: kicks out Peter on the basis that she will not allow Black people to live in her building

=== Theme(s) ===
Racial stereotyping

- Racial stereotypes are placed on Peter throughout the short story. For instance, he plays a spin-off character of Uncle Tom in a production, gets kicked out of his living situation because he is Black, and realizes the "pity" that Ida has for him because of what he looks like. These instances all contribute to the stereotypes that White America has for Black people.

Oppressed becoming the oppressor

- During Peter's dinner with Ida, he has an outburst where mentions going back to where he belongs (with Black people) since he feels under appreciated. Peter realizes that he is unable to "exert any control in the white world" and decides that he can go to the Black community and "[exert] control" over a Black woman."

=== Symbolism ===
Room that Peter is staying in (opening scene)

- The room that Peter is initially depicted in serves as a symbol for "oppression" and the "institutionalization of black male disenfranchisement." The room highlights Peter's own imprisonment as he has limited work opportunities, nowhere to stay, and surrounded by people that do not look like him.

=== Reception ===
- Adam T. Jernigan notes that "Previous Condition" is a commentary and critic of theater in the 1940s when Black people could only find work from a limited pool of "conventional roles."

=== Cultural references ===
- The title of the work is most likely a reference to the 15th amendment of the U.S. Constitution, stating that the right to vote cannot be denied due to "previous condition" of servitude.
- Neighbors are playing Beethoven.
- "Hamp's Boogie," Ella Fitzgerald's "Cow-Cow Boogie."
- Peter's reference to Booker T. Washington.
- Fyodr Dostoyevsky, Crime and Punishment

== "Sonny's Blues" ==
=== Summary ===
"Sonny's Blues" was originally published in Partisan Review in 1957 but is the fifth short story presented in the Going to Meet the Man collection. The story is written from the first-person singular perspective of an unnamed algebra teacher set in Harlem. While the narrator is on the way to work, he learns from the paper that his brother Sonny has been caught in a police raid. On the way home, the narrator encounters a drug addict who informs him about the details of Sonny's arrest. After mulling over the implications of his brother's arrest, the narrator writes Sonny a letter, to which Sonny responds with apologetics. The brothers write back and forth up until the narrator picks Sonny up from his release from jail. Thinking about the past, the narrator reflects on the time when Sonny disclosed to him that he wanted to be a jazz musician, to which he brushed him off. Eventually, Sonny enlists in the Navy without telling his brother, the narrator, and they are reconnected when the narrator picks him up from jail. Sonny's passion for music remained as he invites his brother to a gig that he is playing in. To conclude, the narrator attends and notices that Sonny has found solace in the music and popularity among the audience.

=== Characters ===
- Narrator: Sonny's older brother and algebra teacher
- Sonny: narrator's younger brother who is a recovering drug addict and aspiring jazz musician
- Isabel: narrator's wife
- Creole: Sonny's mentor and leader of the band
- Grace: narrator and Isabel's daughter who died of polio

=== Theme(s) ===
Addiction

- Through Sonny's character, Baldwin touches on drug addiction not only in the streets of New York, but how one's involvement with drugs occurs after their release from the military.

Power of music

- Music is woven throughout "Sonny's Blues" and functions as an escape for the main character Sonny. In the final scene, Sonny reveals a different side of himself to his brother as he expresses who he is through music. The jazz music bridges the gap between Sonny's "eccentric and gifted spirit with humanity."

Brotherly bonds

- The complex nature of brotherly relations is explored through Sonny and the narrator's relationship. As the brothers spend time apart, their relationship begins to strain and it is not until Sonny is back in the narrator's life that they begin to reconnect.

=== Symbolism ===
Joseph in Egypt

- The biblical story of Joseph mirror the life of Sonny. Similar to Joseph, Sonny was "favored by his father" and shares in a complicated relationship with his brother. Sonny was not thrown into a pit like Joseph, but Sonny's relationship with his brother alludes to his addiction, depression, and despair.

Sonny as a Narcotic

- As the narrator reads about his brother Sonny in the paper, he becomes "[captivated]" and mentions that it was like "ice water all up and down [his] veins." The feeling that he is describing while reading about Sonny seem to be similar to that of the effects of heroin.

Light and darkness

- Baldwin uses light and darkness to highlight the "glare of reality" accompanied by the living conditions in the Harlem ghetto. There is also an image of darkness with the movie theater as it presents the darkness of the movies itself and the darkness of the lives of Black people living in Harlem.

=== Reception ===
- Trudier Harris comments on the idea of Sonny as a narcotic by arguing that the "inebriation" was gradually taking place since the beginning of the story. He goes on to say that the "narrator's act of listening amounts to an assemblage of addiction."
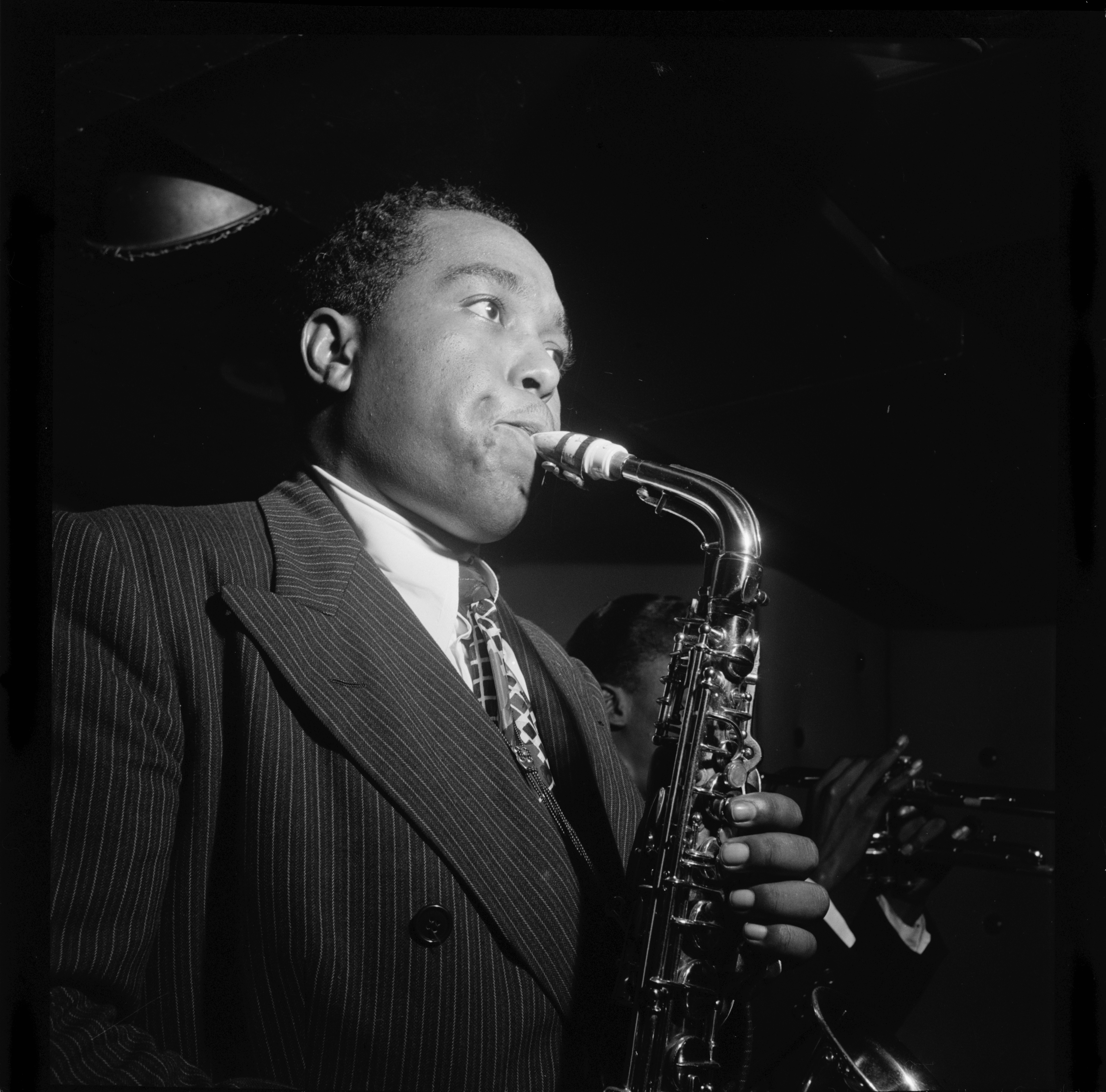
  Jazz musician, Charlie Parker, who was referenced in "Sonny's Blues."
- Susanna Lee notes that "Sonny Blues" encapsulates ambivalence about "where one's parents have been, where one's ancestors have been" and how a traumatic past can shape a person.
- Tracey Sherard claims that the short story "signifies" on the function of blues as it relates to the "history of Black culture in America" to "argue" for the awareness among Black men and women.

=== Cultural references ===
- Harlem Renaissance
- Louis Armstrong and Charlie Parker
- Book of Isaiah as a Biblical reference

== "This Morning, This Evening, So Soon" ==
=== Summary ===
"This Morning, This Evening, So Soon" was originally published in The Atlantic Monthly in 1960 and the seventh short story featured in the Going to Meet the Man collection. The title is a reference to the chorus of the traditional folk song "Tell Old Bill", which recounts the lynching of a man who does not heed the narrator's advice to "leave them downtown girls alone." The narrator is spending his last night in Paris with his family and his sister, who is visiting, before he makes his return to America after twelve years. Throughout the story he reflects on the times that he was in America growing up and how ostracized he felt. For instance, he thinks back to the time when he was shooting Les Fauves Nous Attendent, and how Vidal, the director, had upbraided him for not playing it real. Going back to present time, the narrator and Vidal decide to go to a jazz joint where he will spend his last night in Paris. They run into a group of Black students: Ada Holmes, Boona, and Talley who they perform a musical rendition with. Later, Talley informs the narrator that he saw Boona steal ten American dollars (in francs) from Ada's handbag. After the unresolved accusation, they all return to their houses. The narrator picks up Paul from Mme Dumont, looking towards their voyage towards the United States.

=== Characters ===
- Narrator: jazz singer and actor in a movie (played Chico) who lives in France with his family
- Paul: son of narrator (Chico) and Harriet
- Mme Dumont: the concierge
- Harriet: Paul and Louisa's mother from Sweden
- Louisa: school teacher and narrator's (Chico) sister from Alabama.
- Uncle Norman: uncle of narrator (Chico) and Louisa from Alabama
- Jean Luc Vidal: film director who refers to the narrator by his on-set name, Chico
- Ada Holmes: the African-American girl who invites narrator (Chico) and Vidal to join her and her friends in the jazz joint
- Talley: friend of Ada
- Boona: friend of narrator and prize fighter originally from Tunis

=== Theme(s) ===
Freedom

- The narrator is a Black man from America who flees to Paris because of the racial discrimination in America. In Paris, he embraces his freedom to love who he wants: Harriet, a Swedish girl. Paris provides the narrator with a freedom to experience love that is not judged on the basis of race.

=== Symbolism ===
Louisa, narrator's sister

- Louisa represents the narrator's origins in America, his family, and his "belonging" there. Louisa functions as the narrator's connection and tie back to his upbringing and reminds him where he started.

Singing of the Spiritual

- The narrator sings a spiritual with the Black students he connects with in Paris and this symbolizes their shared generational experiences and "kinship." The narrator gets a slice of what home was like during this encounter and relates it to a feeling of being a church or in a barbershop.

=== Reception ===
- C.W.E. Bigsby "[accuses]" the narrator in "This Morning, This Evening, So Soon" of freeing himself from the "internalized hatred and self-hatred of his American identity."

=== Cultural references ===
- Mahalia Jackson
- Harriet and Louisa are going to see the Folies Bergère while Chico is at the jazz joint.
- On his voyage to America after his mother's death, Chico would sing "I'm Coming, Virginia", "Take This Hammer", "Precious Lord", "Swanee River", Billie Holiday's "Strange Fruit", "Great Getting-Up Morning".
- Vidal mentions Fanny Hill.
- Marlon Brando is said to have been to the restaurant they are going to.
- Hemingway and existentialism are mentioned with regards to clubbers.
- The Algerian War and Charles de Gaulle are mentioned through Vidal's film.
- Black Monday refers to the day of the Brown vs Board of Education decision, as it was referred to by John Bell Williams

== "Come Out the Wilderness" ==
=== Summary ===
"Come Out the Wilderness" was the seventh short story published in the Going to Meet the Man collection. The story follows Ruth, a black woman who works at an insurance agency and her white boyfriend Paul, who is a painter and has taken to coming back home in the wee hours of night. The story is set in Manhattan and their Greenwich Village apartment. Back at Ruth's job she is the only Black employee aside from Mr. Davis, an insurance agent who suggests making her his own secretary and increasing her salary. However, as he suggests taking her out at night, she feels confused and emotional, and they return to work. Later, since Paul called her earlier to say he would be away at some art gallery with Cosmo, she goes to a bar and thinks back to an ex-boyfriend, Arthur and their oppressive relationship. In tears, she walks out of the bar, feeling disoriented.

=== Characters ===
- Ruth: young black woman who works for a life insurance company and is the girlfriend of Paul
- Paul: young white painter and Ruth's boyfriend
- Mr. Davis: the other black man at Ruth's company who is an insurance agent
- Cosmo: friend of Paul's and fellow painter
- Arthur: Ruth's ex-boyfriend, a clarinet player. She left her family home in the South with him. They lived together for four years

=== Theme(s) ===
Interracial love

- Ruth, a black woman, and Paul, a white man are in an interracial relationship that conveys the complexity of love during this time period. Ruth expresses throughout the short story a feeling of societal pressure by dating a white man since he seems to not respect her time or value in the relationship.

Generational power dynamics

- Ruth is taken back when Paul mentions that he will paint a portrait of her because he makes a comment about how much he will be able to sell it for. This comment pulls the historical context of slavery with the context of purchasing a person while revealing the generational power dynamics between White and Black America.

=== Reception ===
- Stanley Kauffman claims that "Come Out of the Wilderness" has an "excellent" way of portraying tension between the "Negro girl" and her "Negro boss."

=== Cultural references ===
- Ruth acknowledges that Paul does not look like a Michelangelo statue.
- One of Ruth's co-workers has a crush on Frank Sinatra.
- Mr Davis hums "Rocks in My Bed".
- African-American slavery

== "Going to Meet the Man" ==
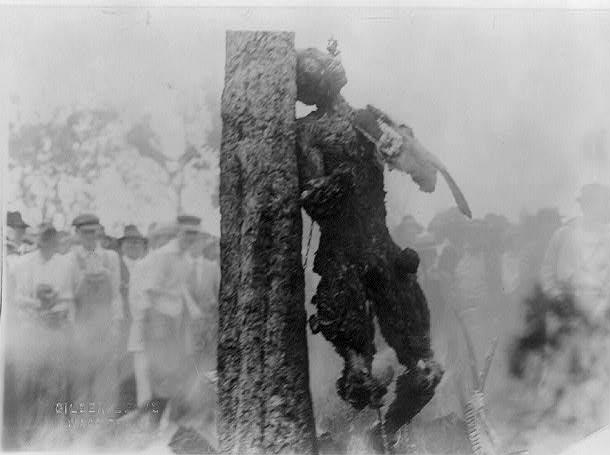
The 1916 lynching of Jesse Washington in Waco, Texas.

=== Context ===
Jesse Washington, a seventeen year old innocent African American male was accused and found guilty of the rape and murder of Lucy Fryer in Waco, Texas during 1916. Washington was convicted by a white-male jury after four minutes of deliberation. Immediately succeeding his verdict, Washington was captured by a lynch mob who shackled him and began to beat him and burn him for two hours. Nearly forty years later when James Baldwin decided to write "Going to Meet the Man," he drew upon inspiration of Jesse Washington's story to highlight the history and rituals of lynching. To contrast, the main character, Jesse, a white police officer, is named after Jesse Washington, who Baldwin uses to explore racism and the development of psychosexual behaviors. Like the young white boys and girls who were brought to see the lynching of Jesse Washington, Jesse, in the short story was also taken to a lynching at a young age by his parents.

=== Summary ===
Originally published in 1965, "Going to Meet the Man," is the final short story in the collection, told from the perspective of a white police officer, Jesse, spanning across an unrestful night. The short story opens up with Jesse's inability to perform during an intimate moment with his wife, Grace, due to a lack of arousal. This causes Jesse to consider the situation at work where he is tasked with quieting protestors during a Civil Rights demonstration. Jesse's boss, Big Jim C., cannot seem to quiet down the protestors, so the leader is taken in and Jesse continues to beat him while being aroused by the violence. With Jesse's inflicted violence, a memory is unlocked from his childhood when his parents took him to view a lynching, validating his present-day violence toward African Americans.

=== Characters ===
- Jesse (narrator): police officer
- Grace: Jesse's wife
- Big Jim C.: Jesse's boss and police officer
- Protest Leader
  - Grandson of Julia Blossom (Old Julia): Jesse's previous customer from the mail-order catalog
- Otis: childhood friend of Jesse

=== Theme(s) ===
Lynching as a spectacle

- Lynching is defined as the public execution of a person without due process of the law and during the 19th and 20th centuries. Black men and women were the primary targets of lynch mobs where they were brutally beaten, burned, or even castrated in front of large audiences. For White America, lynchings were to celebrate white supremacy and the eradication of Black people. In "Going to Meet the Man," Baldwin demonstrates the intergenerational effects of lynching as children, including Jesse, are spectators of these events.

Psychosexual and homoeroticism

- In Sigmund Freud's psychoanalytic theory, he describes psychosexual as how one's desire for sexual gratification can effect their personality. In "Going to Meet the Man," Jesse becomes sexually aroused as he witnesses the castration of a black man, linking to homoeroticism.

Oedipus Complex

- Oedipus Complex was a term coined by Sigmund Freud, highlighting a male child's psychosexual development during the Phallic stage in which they unconsciously become sexually aroused by their mother. In "Going to Meet the Man," Jesse experiences the Oedipus Complex during a scene where he laid his head on his mother's lap and felt aroused. Jesse resolves his Oedipus during the castration and lynching that he witnesses with his father where he taking a liking to him.

=== Symbolism ===
==== "Big Jim C." ====
- The character "Big Jim C." is used as a personification and symbol for the larger Jim Crow laws enforced in this story's setting. The character plays a violent police officer who inflicts harm upon African-American Civil Rights activists and protestors. "Big Jim C." symbolizes the goal of the Jim Crow laws: segregation, through an abuse of power by law enforcement to keep African-American people away from equality through violence and intimidation.

=== Reception ===
Various critics have tied Jesse's psychosexual tendencies to racism in the South.

- Louis H. Pratt claims that there is symbolism between Jesse's inability to sexually perform and his lack of self-awareness toward the crimes that he has committed as a police officer toward African Americans.
- Tiffany Gilbert mentions that Jesse's frailty is caused by the build up of White supremacy and abuse of authority. In regard to Jesse's sexuality, Gilbert claims that the "joy" he feels is homoerotic and amplified from his arousal of black men and women.
- Matt Brim takes a unique approach on "Going to Meet the Man" by noting Baldwin's untraditional way of talking about homosexuality.
- Roger Whitlow argues that sexual gratification is attained through racial violence in "Going to Meet the Man."
