= Solo Flight =

Solo flight may refer to:

- Solo Flight (Laurence Juber album), 1990
- Solo Flight (Charlie Byrd album), 1964
- "Solo Flight" (composition), a 1941 instrumental song by Benny Goodman and His Orchestra
- Solo Flight: The Genius of Charlie Christian, a 1972 album
- Solo Flight (Ray Bryant album), 1977
- Solo Flights, a 1968 album by Chet Atkins
- Solo Flight (video game), a 1983 flight simulator game for the Commodore 64 and Atari 8-bit computers
- First solo flight of a student pilot

== See also ==
- Flying Solo (disambiguation)
