= When My Man Comes Home =

Single by Buddy and Ella Johnson
- B-side: "I'll Always Be With You"
- Released: 1944
- Recorded: 1943
- Genre: Jazz; Blues
- Label: Decca
- Songwriter(s): Buddy Johnson, J. Mayo Williams

Buddy and Ella Johnson singles chronology
"I Done Found Out" (1942)	"When My Man Comes Home" (1944)	"That's the Stuff You Gotta Watch" (1944)

"When My Man Comes Home" is a 1944 song by Buddy Johnson and His Orchestra. The single with vocals by Ella Johnson was the most successful R&B hit of Buddy Johnson's career. "When My Man Comes Home" went to number one on the Harlem Hit Parade for one week and peaked at number eighteen on the pop chart.
