= Going to Meet the Man (short story) =

1965 short story by James Baldwin

"Going to Meet the Man" is a short story by American author James Baldwin. It was published in 1965 in the short story collection of the same name.

== Plot summary ==
Jesse is a white deputy sheriff in a small Southern town. As the story opens, he is lying in bed with his wife, Grace. The two attempt to have sex but Jesse is unable to achieve an erection. Frustrated, Jesse imagines the dirtier things that he could force a black woman to do. The plot then proceeds in a series of flashbacks.

Jesse first remembers a scene from earlier that day. He and a character named Big Jim C. had arrested a young black Civil Rights leader in town. "They had this line you know, to register, and they wouldn't stay where Big Jim C. wanted them", Jesse recounts to a half-sleeping Grace. Jesse visits the young man in his jail cell. He beats him, shocks him with a cattle prod, and declares, "you are going to stop coming down to the court house and disrupting traffic and molesting the people and keeping us from our duties and keeping doctors from getting to sick white women and getting all them Northerners in this town to give our town a bad name—!"

As Jesse is about to leave the cell, the Civil Rights leader, now barely conscious, says to him, "You remember Old Julia?" Old Julia had been one of Jesse's mail-order recipients in a previous job (a job in which he had deliberately exploited black customers). Jesse suddenly realizes that he'd met the young man years before: he's Old Julia's grandson. Even as a child, Jesse had perceived him to be insolent and disrespectful. Enraged, Jesse beats him again and exclaims, "You lucky we pump some white blood into you every once in a while—your women!" Jesse then grabs his crotch, and feels his own penis "violently stiffen".

Still in bed with Grace, Jesse then thinks more generally about how the cultural climate in the South has changed. White supremacy had once been the status quo, but now white folks seem less certain of their inherent superiority. Local black folks have become agitated, and Northerners have taken an active role in Southern politics. Jesse laments these changes. He tells himself that he's doing God's work, "[p]rotecting white people from the niggers and the niggers from themselves", but admits that he "misse[s] the ease of former years" when white folks could be more open about their racism.

Then, "out of nowhere", Jesse recalls the lyrics to an old slave song, "Wade in the Water". This initiates one final flashback to when Jesse was eight years old, riding in a car with his mother and father. The family had heard the song as they passed by a black neighborhood. "I guess they singing for him", Jesse's father says. To whom "him" refers is vague. As a child, Jesse had had a black friend named Otis. He realizes that he has not seen Otis—nor any other black people—for several days, but he does not understand why. "I reckon Otis's folks was afraid to let him show himself", his father says.

The next morning, the white folks in town all gather to witness the brutal lynching of a black man. Jesse sits on his father's shoulders and watches as the man is castrated and burned alive. Whatever offense the man may have committed is never revealed. The scene is gruesome and violent yet treated as a spectacle for the whites, who leave the charred and mutilated body to rot while they settle down for a picnic.

As he remembers this scene, Jesse looks at Grace with renewed vigor. "Come on sugar," he says, "I'm going to do you like a nigger, just like a nigger, come on, sugar, and love me just like you'd love a nigger." The story ends as Jesse has sex with Grace "harder than he ever had before".

== Interpretation ==
Several elements in the story allude to the Civil Rights Movement of the 1950s and early 1960s. The character Big Jim C., for example, is almost certainly a personification of the Jim Crow laws that enforced racial segregation in the South. Many of these laws remained in effect until the passage of the Civil Rights Act in 1964 and the Voting Rights Act in 1965. When Jesse claims that the blacks "had this line you know, to register", the implication is that they wanted to register to vote and therefore "wouldn't stay where [Jim Crow] wanted them"—i.e., lacking any political or economic agency.

"Jim C." could more specifically (or in addition) refer to Jim Clark, sheriff of Dallas County, Alabama from 1955 to 1966. Clark is widely remembered as a racist who employed violent methods (such as cattle prods) against Civil Rights protesters.

The lynching at the end of the story is a reference to the lynching of Jesse Washington, in Waco, Texas, on May 15, 1916.

Perhaps the most notable formal aspect of the story is Baldwin's decision to focalize it through the point-of-view of a white police officer. Jesse does not seem to possess a conventional character arc in which he changes in any significant way throughout the story. By the end he appears to copulate with his wife without gaining a deeper understanding of himself or overcoming his racism. The reasons for this may be complex. Baldwin himself was black, and during a 1965 debate with conservative intellectual William F. Buckley Jr., he said the following about whites in the American South:

[W]hat happens to the poor white man’s, the poor white woman’s, mind? It is this: they have been raised to believe, and by now they helplessly believe, that no matter how terrible some of their lives may be and no matter what disaster overtakes them, there is one consolation like a heavenly revelation—at least they are not black. I suggest that of all the terrible things that could happen to a human being that is one of the worst. I suggest that what has happened to the white Southerner is in some ways much worse than what has happened to the Negroes there.

Jesse's racism could thus be interpreted as the result of a psychological trauma, which helps to explain why, upon finally returning to the "present", he fantasizes about being black in order to perform sexually with his wife. Much like how the Oedipal father figure represents the threat of castration, the stereotype of black men's sexual prowess—figuring in the description of the man's penis being "much bigger than his father's"—informs both Jesse's fear of empowering blacks as well as his perverse desire to be black.

The man with the knife took the nigger's privates in his hand, one hand, still smiling, as though he were weighing them. In the cradle of the one white hand, the nigger's privates seemed as remote as meat being weighed in the scales; but seemed heavier, too, much heavier, and Jesse felt his scrotum tighten; and huge, huge, much bigger than his father's, flaccid, hairless, the largest thing he had ever seen till then, and the blackest.

As such, "Going to Meet the Man" suggests that Jesse's racism is so deep-seated that not only does it structure his political world view, but his entire personality. This type of racism is difficult to overcome, and it is in this way that Baldwin dramatizes the idea that what has happened to Southern whites is actually worse than what has happened to Southern blacks. In the same debate with William F. Buckley Jr., in fact, Baldwin claims that "[t]he white South African or Mississippi sharecropper or Alabama sheriff has at bottom a system of reality which compels them really to believe when they face the Negro that this woman, this man, this child must be insane to attack the system to which he owes his entire identity". We can see this notion operative in Jesse's inability to understand why black folks would want to upset the social order, as well as in his outright hostility towards any challenge to white male dominance. In this respect, despite the horrible things he does, Jesse can be interpreted as a tragic figure—a victim of the very racist ideology he perpetuates.
