= Flying Solo =

Flying Solo may refer to:

- Flying solo, the first solo flight
- A single person, sometimes referred to as "flying solo"
- Flying Solo (novel), a 1998 novel by Ralph Fletcher
- Flying Solo, a 1998 book by Leonard Kriegel
- Flying Solo, a 2007 play by Bruce Venables and Richard Fidler, with Noeline Brown
- "Flying Solo", exhibit at The McLoughlin Gallery

== Television ==
- "Flying Solo", an episode of Arctic Air
- "Flying Solo", an episode of Major Dad
- "Flying Solo", an episode of Doctors, with Lucy Briers
- "Flying Solo", a season 5 episode of The Loud House

== Music ==
- Flying Solo, a 2010 album by Keri Noble
- Flying Solo, a 2009 album by Augustin Hadelich
- Flying Solo, a 2003 album by Jens Lindemann
- "Flyin’ Solo", a song by Poco from the album The Essential Collection (1975–1982)
- "Flyin' Solo", a song by Dogs D'Amour from the 1999 album Straight??!!

== See also ==
- Solo Flight (disambiguation)
