= Sonny's Blues =

1957 short story by James Baldwin

"Sonny's Blues" is a 1957 short story written by James Baldwin, originally published in the Partisan Review (vol. 24, no. 3). The short story focuses on themes of suffering, forgiveness, and music's beneficial power. "Sonny's Blues" is told through the eyes of an unknown narrator, examining into the relationship between two brothers: Sonny, a jazz musician struggling with addiction, and the narrator, an educator dealing with his own inner challenges. Set in 1950s Harlem, Baldwin's narrative analyzes the relationship between individual sorrow and systematic injustice, as well as the ways in which music may be utilized to heal and unite one another. Baldwin republished the work in the 1965 short story collection Going to Meet the Man.

== Plot summary ==
The narrator of "Sonny's Blues", a schoolteacher from Harlem, New York, finds out that his brother, Sonny, was arrested for the possession of heroin. Looking back on his brother's past as well as their overall relationship with one another, the narrator developed mixed emotions about his brother. He is also concerned about the young boys that he teaches in his class, who may have to deal with similar challenges in their future. The narrator starts to feel the burden of his brother's situation after meeting a friend of Sonny's who warns him that Sonny's problems will not go away even after the rehabilitation.

The narrator finally contacts Sonny after his daughter, Grace, passes away from polio. The narrator leaves for the Army, leaving Sonny with his wife, Isabel, and her parents. When Sonny first makes the choice to start playing the piano, his commitment becomes addictive. Isabel's family could not bear the constant noise coming from Sonny's practice of the piano. Sonny leaves the apartment after two days, quits school, and joins the Navy after Isabel's parents find out that he has not been attending school. Problems between the brothers develop after Sonny's return from the Navy until the narrator eventually chooses to repair the gap between them.

After Grace passes away, the narrator considers his responsibilities as an older brother and decides to stand by Sonny. The narrator had mixed feelings about searching Sonny's room once Isabel had taken the children from the house only to become starstruck by the music outside of the apartment. He then realizes how much music has an effect on Sonny emotionally.

The narrator is later invited by Sonny to a Greenwich Village jazz club. Sonny utilizes music as a way to cope and express his thoughts about addiction and suffering at the jazz club. His performance is very powerful and emotional. Sonny initially struggles at the beginning of his performance, but he then pours his heart into the song and draws in the crowd. This incident turns into a breakthrough for the narrator, who develops an understanding of Sonny's agony and how music can turn it into beauty.

== Character analysis ==
Sonny: a young man dealing with heroin addiction. Sonny is a talented jazz musician who uses his art to cope with hardship.

The Narrator: Sonny's older brother is a high school teacher, and the story's point of view character.

Isabel: the narrator's wife and his emotional anchor.

Grace: the narrator's daughter. Her tragic death from polio leads the narrator to reconnect with Sonny after a lengthy period of separation.

Sonny's father: a demanding and challenging man.

Sonny's Mother: strong, protective, and wise figure.

Creole: an experienced musician who acts as Sonny's mentor.

== Themes ==
=== Major themes ===
In the short story, Baldwin addresses the concept of suffering as man's basic state through themes of addiction, search for identity, heritage, familial relationships and racial relations in America during the 1940s. He utilizes Jazz and Blues music as the central mode in which the Narrator explores his individuality and self expression, holding the view that a main function of art is its use in being an antidote to suffering.

==== Music themes ====
The story utilizes the musical genres of Jazz and Blues as a function to portray themes of individualism and alienation. Sonny is a jazz pianist, a genre of music that emphasizes individuality through improvisation and soloing, used to convey that he is trying to find his own voice in the world separate from his family. Sonny's jazz-oriented lifestyle which involves using and selling heroin which ultimately leads him to a jail sentence, estranges him from his brother whom he lives with. Baldwin uses the bebop culture of the 1940s and 50s which viewed younger jazz musicians such as Charlie Parker as "hip" and older jazz musicians such as Louis Armstrong as "old-time" as a parallel of Sonny, who idolizes Parker and follows in his footsteps of risqué behavior involving drugs and sex, and his brother, a respected math teacher who has dissociated himself from black culture to fit into society, clings to older, more traditional jazz which by the 50s was viewed as white-washed and disconnected from its black origins.

==== Biblical themes ====
James Tackach, a professor of English at Roger Williams University argues that the story is primarily structured upon the biblical narratives of the Parable of the Prodigal Son from the Gospel of Luke and the story of Cain and Abel from the Book of Genesis.

In the former he paints it as a retelling of the parable with Sonny acting as the Younger Son who is "lost" by his drug addiction and his jazz musician oriented lifestyle and the Narrator as the self-righteous Elder Son by way of his family oriented lifestyle and honest job as a mathematics teacher. Like the parable, the story concludes with the reconciliation of the two brothers. The death of the Narrators daughter, Grace, leads him to write to Sonny in prison and ultimately welcoming him home again. The final scene suggests that Sonny is "found", alluding to the fathers final statement in the biblical parable.

In the latter, he posits that the Narrators initial neglect of Sonny echoes the Cain and Abel. The narrator promised their mother that he would "hold on to your brother... and don't let him fall". His failure hits him when he learns of Sonny's arrest by reading the newspaper on the way to work. Later the same day, when the narrator speaks to one of Sonny's friends regarding his arrest his response is, "I'm not sure I'm going to do anything. Anyway, what the hell can I do?". This is an allusion to Cain's question to God after he kills his brother Abel, asking "Am I my brother's keeper?" (Gen. 4.9). The Narrators daughter, Grace is highly symbolic, her death represents his own "loss of grace", stemming from the broken promise to his mother and his grief finally allows him to identify with the darkness and pain in Sonny's life.

In the final scene of the story, after Sonny's performance, the Narrator sends him a Scotch and milk, which sits on the piano and "glowed and shook above my brother's head like the very cup of trembling". The phrase "cup of trembling" (or "cup of fury") comes from the Book of Isaiah (Isa. 51.17, 22–23). In the Biblical story, the people of Jerusalem had sinned and "drunk at the hand of the Lord the cup of his fury," but God promises to take the cup away and put it into the hands of those who afflict them as symbol of protection. Like the sinners in Isaiah, Sonny has drunk from the cup of trembling via his drug addiction and suffered God's fury by going to prison. The glowing drink above Sonny's head symbolizes his redemption by becoming a "shining halo". The Narrator, by purchasing the drink, assumes the role of God by taking the "cup of wrath" from Sonny, solidifying his role as his Sonny's protector.

Housing Projects

The housing projects represent the oppression that African Americans in Harlem faced. Although they are built with good intentions, they are inevitably transformed into what the builders were trying to fix, and there is no attempt to correct such transformation. It sort of becomes a “parody of good.” It is a representation of the ever-present societal oppression that African Americans in Harlem faced. “These streets hadn't changed, though housing projects jutted up out of them now like rocks in the middle of a boiling sea. Most of the houses in which we had grown up had vanished… But houses exactly like the houses of our past yet dominated the landscape, boys exactly like the boys we once had been found themselves smothering in these houses, came down into the streets for light and air and found themselves encircled by disaster. Some escaped the trap; most didn't. Those who got out always left something of themselves behind.” (Baldwin, 1957, pg. 7)

The Streets of Harlem

The streets serve as a representation of oppression and confinement. Baldwin portrays the neighborhood as the setting of crime, poverty, and hopelessness, reflecting the characters terrible lives and limited opportunities. Harlem, however, also symbolizes identity and community, capturing the struggles and shared culture that influence Sonny's and his narrator's lives.

The father also describes the streets of Harlem as gloomy and tragic from personal experience of his brother who died, connecting the streets of Harlem as a symbol of despair. His memories reveal how the environment seems to hold the weight of past suffering, suggesting that Harlem is not just a physical place but an emotional landscape shaped by loss. Sonny describes Harlem as a "deep, real deep and funky hole"(Baldwin, 1957, pg. 22) and "the sun up there, outside"(Baldwin, 1957, pg. 22) symbolizing that Sonny feels trapped and longs to escape the suffocating environment that has shaped his life. These emphasize the contrast between the darkness he feels surrounded in and the distant light that represents freedom or hope. Sonny believes the only way he can reach that light and liberate himself from Harlem's emotional and social constraints is by saving himself through music, which becomes his way of survival.

The Obligation Toward Brotherly Love

The entire story revolves around the relationship between the narrator and his brother Sonny. Before the narrator's mother dies, she bestows him the role of Sonny's keeper; she tells the narrator to watch over Sonny, and to “let him know that [he’s] there.” Later in the story, Sonny reminds the narrator that although he is clean from drug abuse, his problems are far from over, and the narrator makes a silent promise to himself to always be there for his brother.

== References to other works ==
- In the final scene Creole, the band and Sonny play "Am I Blue?".

=== Songs referenced ===
- "Lord You Brought Me From a Long Ways Off"
- "Mighty Long Way You've Brought Me"
- "Some Cold, Rainy Day"
- "The Old Ship of Zion"
- "If I Could Hear My Mother Pray Again"
- "God Be with You Till We Meet Again"
- "Am I Blue?"
