= Ella Johnson =

American jazz musician (1919–2004)

Ella Johnson (June 22, 1919 – February 16, 2004) was an American jazz and rhythm and blues singer.

== Music career ==
Born Ella Mae Jackson in Darlington, South Carolina, United States, she joined her brother Buddy Johnson in New York as a teenager, where he was leading a popular band at the Savoy Ballroom. Her singing drew comparisons to Ella Fitzgerald and Billie Holiday.

Johnson scored her first hit with "Please, Mr. Johnson" in 1940. Subsequent hits included "Did You See Jackie Robinson Hit That Ball?", "When My Man Comes Home" and "Hittin' On Me". Her popular 1945 recording of "Since I Fell for You", composed by her brother, led to its eventual establishment as a jazz standard. She continued to perform with Buddy Johnson into the 1960s. AllMusic noted that her "later solo sides for Mercury are pale imitations of her work with the band."

In February 2004, she died of Alzheimer's disease in New York at the age of 84.

== Selected discography ==
- Rock and Roll (Mercury, 1956)
- Walkin' (1957)
- Swing Me (Mercury, 1958)
- Go Ahead and Rock (Roulette, 1959)
- Say Ella (Juke Box, 1983)

=== Compilations ===
- 1953-1964 4CD (Bear Family Records, 1992)
- Rockin' and Rollin (1995)
- Jukebox Hits: 1940-1951 (Acrobat, 2004)
- Gotta Go Upside Your Head: The Rock & Roll Years 1953-1955 (Rev-Ola, 2006)
- Rock On! The 1956-62 Recordings (Hoodoo, 2015)
- The Decca Years (Jasmine, 2025)
- The Mercury Years (Jasmine, 2025)
