= Main Stem =

Instrumental by Duke Ellington
- Released: 1944
- Recorded: 1942
- Genre: Jazz

"Main Stem" is 1942 instrumental by Duke Ellington and His Famous Orchestra. Although recorded in 1942, the single was not released until 1944 where it was Duke Ellington's last of four number ones on the Harlem Hit Parade. "Main Stem" also peaked at number twenty on the Billboard pop chart.

== See also ==
- List of Billboard number-one R&B singles of the 1940s
