= G.I. Jive =

Single by Johnny Mercer
- Released: 1943
- Genre: R&B
- Songwriter: Johnny Mercer

"G.I. Jive" is a 1943 comical song about the drudgery of military life written and originally performed by Johnny Mercer. Mercer recorded the song with Paul Weston and his Orchestra on October 15, 1943 for his own Capitol Records label. The song was released on Capitol 141 in December 1943 and reviewed by Billboard magazine in its December 11, 1943 issue.

== Background ==
Mercer intended to write a song that the soldiers would like, and the song was the biggest hit of all the songs dealing with soldier life during World War II.

== Chart performance ==
The single was a hit twice in 1944 by two different performers: Johnny Mercer hit number one on the Harlem Hit Parade for one week and peaked at number thirteen on the pop charts. Three months later, Louis Jordan also made it to number one on both the Harlem Hit Parade and the pop chart with "G.I. Jive".
