= Hamp's Boogie Woogie =

1944 composition by Milt Buckner and Lionel Hampton

"Hamp's Boogie Woogie" is a 1944 instrumental written by Milt Buckner and Lionel Hampton and performed by Lionel Hampton and His Orchestra. The song, featuring Earl Bostic on alto sax, hit number one on the Harlem Hit Parade and peaked at number eighteen. The song was number seven on Billboard's Annual High School Student Survey in 1945.

== See also ==
- List of Billboard number-one R&B singles of the 1940s
