= Solo Flight (composition) =

Single by Benny Goodman and His Orchestra
- B-side: "The World Is Waiting for the Sunrise"
- Released: December 10, 1943
- Recorded: March 4, 1941
- Genre: Swing
- Length: 2:40
- Label: Columbia
- Songwriters: Charlie Christian, Benny Goodman, Jimmy Mundy

"Solo Flight" is a 1941 instrumental song by Benny Goodman and His Orchestra. The instrumental on the Columbia label, featured guitarist, Charlie Christian, and was released in early 1944. "Solo Flight" peaked at number sixteen on the pop charts and was number one on the Harlem Hit Parade.
