= List of accolades received by Dawn of the Planet of the Apes =

Dawn of the Planet of the Apes is a 2014 American science fiction film directed by Matt Reeves and written by Mark Bomback, Rick Jaffa and Amanda Silver. It stars Andy Serkis, Jason Clarke, Gary Oldman, Keri Russell, Toby Kebbell, Kodi Smit-McPhee, and Kirk Acevedo. It is the sequel to the 2011 film Rise of the Planet of the Apes, which began 20th Century Fox's reboot of the original Planet of the Apes series. The film grossed $208,545,589 in the US & Canada and $500,290,000 in other countries, for a worldwide total of $708,835,589.

== Awards and nominations ==
Award	Category	Recipients and nominees	Result	Ref(s)
4th AACTA International Awards	Best International Supporting Actor	Andy Serkis	Nominated	
Academy Awards	Best Visual Effects	Joe Letteri, Dan Lemmon, Daniel Barrett and Erik Winquist	Nominated	
Annie Awards	Outstanding Achievement, Character Animation in a Live Action Production	Daniel Barrett, Paul Story, Eteuati Tema, Alessandro Bonora, Dejan Momcilovic	Won	
Art Directors Guild	Best Fantasy Film	James Chinlund	Nominated	
BAFTA Awards	Best Visual Effects	Joe Letteri, Dan Lemmon, Daniel Barrett, Erik Winquist	Nominated	
Critics' Choice Awards	Best Visual Effects	Dawn of the Planet of the Apes	Won	
Critics' Choice Awards	Best Sci-Fi/Horror Movie	Dawn of the Planet of the Apes	Nominated	
Empire Awards	Best Film	Dawn of the Planet of the Apes	Nominated	
Empire Awards	Best Director	Matt Reeves	Nominated	
Empire Awards	Best Actor	Andy Serkis	Won	
Empire Awards	Best Sci-Fi/Fantasy	Dawn of the Planet of the Apes	Nominated	
Houston Film Critics Society Awards	Best Supporting Actor	Andy Serkis	Nominated	
Houston Film Critics Society Awards	Technical Achievement	Dawn of the Planet of the Apes	Nominated	
Saturn Awards	Best Science Fiction Film	Dawn of the Planet of the Apes	Nominated	
Saturn Awards	Best Director	Matt Reeves	Nominated	
Saturn Awards	Best Supporting Actor	Andy Serkis	Nominated	
Saturn Awards	Best Performance by a Younger Actor	Kodi Smit-McPhee	Nominated	
Saturn Awards	Best Music	Michael Giacchino	Nominated	
Saturn Awards	Best Production Design	James Chinlund	Nominated	
Saturn Awards	Best Make-up	Bill Terezakis, Lisa Love	Nominated	
Saturn Awards	Best Special Effects	Joe Letteri, Dan Lemmon, Daniel Barrett, Erik Winquist	Nominated	
Visual Effects Society	Outstanding Visual Effects in an Effects Driven Feature Motion Picture	Joe Letteri, Ryan Stafford, Matt Kutcher, Dan Lemmon, Hannah Blanchini	Won	
Visual Effects Society	Outstanding Performance of an Animated Character in a Photoreal/Live Action Feature Motion Picture	Paul Story, Eteuati Tema, Andrea Merlo, Emiliano Padovani (for Caesar)	Won	
Visual Effects Society	Outstanding Performance of an Animated Character in a Photoreal/Live Action Feature Motion Picture	Daniel Barrett, Alessandro Bonora, Mark Edward Allen, Masaya Suzuki (for Koba)	Nominated	
Visual Effects Society	Outstanding Virtual Cinematography in a Photoreal/Live Action Feature Motion Picture	Keith Miller, Jonathan Paquin, Alessandro Sapono, David Houghton Williams	Nominated	
Visual Effects Society	Outstanding Compositing in a Photoreal/Live Action Feature Motion Picture	Christoph Salzmann, Florian Schroeder, Quentin Hema, Simone Riginelli	Nominated	
Washington D.C. Area Film Critics Association	Washington D.C. Area Film Critics Association Award for Best Supporting Actor	Andy Serkis	Nominated	
World Soundtrack Academy	Film Composer of the Year	Michael Giacchino (also for Inside Out, Jupiter Ascending, Jurassic World, Tomorrowland)	Won	
