= 38th Saturn Awards =

US film and television award ceremony

- Date: July 26, 2012
- Site: Burbank, California, U.S.

Highlights
- Most awards: Rise of the Planet of the Apes; Super 8 (3)
- Most nominations: Harry Potter and the Deathly Hallows – Part 2; Hugo (10)

The 38th Saturn Awards, honoring the best in science fiction, fantasy and horror film and television in 2011, were held on July 26, 2012 in Burbank, California. The awards are presented by the Academy of Science Fiction, Fantasy and Horror Films.

The six Best Film Award categories were respectively won by Rise of the Planet of the Apes (Science Fiction), Harry Potter and the Deathly Hallows – Part 2 (Fantasy), The Girl with the Dragon Tattoo (Horror or Thriller), Mission: Impossible – Ghost Protocol (Action or Adventure), The Skin I Live In (International) and Puss in Boots (Animated). Rise of the Planet of the Apes and Super 8 led the winners with three each.

In the television categories, Breaking Bad won three of its six nominations, including Best Syndicated/Cable Television Series. Fringe, The Walking Dead and Teen Wolf won the other Best Series Awards.

Harry Potter and the Deathly Hallows – Part 2 became the first Harry Potter film to win Best Fantasy Film, for which the seven previous Harry Potter films were nominated, and only the second film of the series to win a Saturn Award, following The Philosopher's Stone which won Best Costume in 2001. Mission: Impossible – Ghost Protocol also became the first Mission:Impossible film to win Best Action or Adventure Film, following the nominations of the first and third installments.

== Winners and nominees ==
These are the winners and nominees for the 38th Annual Saturn Awards.

=== Special awards ===
- The George Pal Memorial Award: Martin Scorsese
- The Life Career Award: Frank Oz and James Remar
- The Filmmakers Showcase Award: Drew Goddard
- The Milestone Award: The Simpsons
- The Innovator Award: Robert Kirkman
- The Appreciation Award: Jeffrey Ross (for hosting the Saturn Awards)

=== Film ===
Best Science Fiction Film	Best Fantasy Film
Rise of the Planet of the Apes; The Adjustment Bureau; Captain America: The First Avenger; Limitless; Super 8; X-Men: First Class	Harry Potter and the Deathly Hallows – Part 2; Hugo; Immortals; Midnight in Paris; The Muppets; Thor
Best Horror or Thriller Film	Best Action or Adventure Film
The Girl with the Dragon Tattoo; Contagion; The Devil's Double; The Grey; Take Shelter; The Thing	Mission: Impossible – Ghost Protocol; Fast Five; The Lincoln Lawyer; Red Tails; Sherlock Holmes: A Game of Shadows; War Horse
Best Actor	Best Actress
Michael Shannon – Take Shelter as Curtis LaForche; Antonio Banderas – The Skin I Live In as Robert Ledgard; Dominic Cooper – The Devil's Double as Latif Yahia / Uday Hussein; Tom Cruise – Mission: Impossible – Ghost Protocol as Ethan Hunt; Chris Evans – Captain America: The First Avenger as Steve Rogers / Captain America; Ben Kingsley – Hugo as Georges Méliès	Kirsten Dunst – Melancholia as Justine; Jessica Chastain – Take Shelter as Samantha LaForche; Rooney Mara – The Girl with the Dragon Tattoo as Lisbeth Salander; Brit Marling – Another Earth as Rhoda Williams; Keira Knightley – A Dangerous Method as Sabina Spielrein; Elizabeth Olsen – Martha Marcy May Marlene as Martha
Best Supporting Actor	Best Supporting Actress
Andy Serkis – Rise of the Planet of the Apes as Caesar; Ralph Fiennes – Harry Potter and the Deathly Hallows – Part 2 as Lord Voldemort; Harrison Ford – Cowboys & Aliens as Colonel Woodrow Dolarhyde; Tom Hiddleston – Thor as Loki; Alan Rickman – Harry Potter and the Deathly Hallows – Part 2 as Severus Snape; Stanley Tucci – Captain America: The First Avenger as Abraham Erskine	Emily Blunt – The Adjustment Bureau as Elise Sellas; Elena Anaya – The Skin I Live In as Vera Cruz; Charlotte Gainsbourg – Melancholia as Claire; Paula Patton – Mission: Impossible – Ghost Protocol as Jane Carter; Lin Shaye – Insidious as Elise Rainier; Emma Watson – Harry Potter and the Deathly Hallows – Part 2 as Hermione Granger
Best Performance by a Younger Actor	Best Director
Joel Courtney – Super 8 as Joseph "Joe" Lamb; Asa Butterfield – Hugo as Hugo Cabret; Elle Fanning – Super 8 as Alice "Allie" Dainard; Dakota Goyo – Real Steel as Max Kenton; Chloë Grace Moretz – Hugo as Isabelle; Saoirse Ronan – Hanna as Hanna Heller	J. J. Abrams – Super 8; Brad Bird – Mission: Impossible – Ghost Protocol; Martin Scorsese – Hugo; Steven Spielberg – The Adventures of Tintin; Rupert Wyatt – Rise of the Planet of the Apes; David Yates – Harry Potter and the Deathly Hallows – Part 2
Best Writing	Best Music
Jeff Nichols – Take Shelter; J. J. Abrams – Super 8; Woody Allen – Midnight in Paris; Mike Cahill and Brit Marling – Another Earth; Rick Jaffa and Amanda Silver – Rise of the Planet of the Apes; John Logan – Hugo	Michael Giacchino – Super 8; Michael Giacchino – Mission: Impossible – Ghost Protocol; Howard Shore – Hugo; Alan Silvestri – Captain America: The First Avenger; John Williams – The Adventures of Tintin; John Williams – War Horse
Best Editing	Best Production Design
Paul Hirsch – Mission: Impossible – Ghost Protocol; Maryann Brandon, Mary Jo Markey – Super 8; Mark Day – Harry Potter and the Deathly Hallows – Part 2; Michael Kahn – The Adventures of Tintin; Kelly Matsumoto, Fred Raskin, Christian Wagner – Fast Five; Thelma Schoonmaker – Hugo	Dante Ferretti – Hugo; Stuart Craig – Harry Potter and the Deathly Hallows – Part 2; Tom Foden – Immortals; Rick Heinrichs – Captain America: The First Avenger; Kim Sinclair – The Adventures of Tintin; Bo Welch – Thor
Best Costume	Best Make-up
Alexandra Byrne – Thor; Jenny Beavan – Sherlock Holmes: A Game of Shadows; Lisy Christl – Anonymous; Sandy Powell – Hugo; Anna B. Sheppard – Captain America: The First Avenger; Jany Temime – Harry Potter and the Deathly Hallows – Part 2	Dave Elsey, Fran Needham and Conor O'Sullivan – X-Men: First Class; Shaun Smith and Scott Wheeler – Conan the Barbarian; Nick Dudman and Amanda Knight – Harry Potter and the Deathly Hallows – Part 2; Annick Chartier, Adrien Morot and Nikoletta Skarlatos – Immortals; Tamar Aviv – The Skin I Live In; Tom Woodruff Jr. and Alec Gillis – The Thing
Best Special Effects	Best International Film
Dan Lemmon, Joe Letteri, R. Christopher White and Daniel Barrett – Rise of the Planet of the Apes; Scott E. Anderson, Matt Aitken, Joe Letteri, Matthias Menz, and Keith Miller – The Adventures of Tintin; Mark Soper, Christopher Townsend, Paul Corbould – Captain America: The First Avenger; Scott Benza, John Frazier, Matthew Butler and Scott Farrar – Transformers: Dark of the Moon; Tim Burke, Greg Butler, John Richardson, and David Vickery – Harry Potter and the Deathly Hallows – Part 2; Steven Riley, Russell Earl, Kim Libreri, and Dennis Muren – Super 8	The Skin I Live In; Attack the Block; Largo Winch; Melancholia; Point Blank; Trollhunter
Best Animated Film
Puss in Boots; The Adventures of Tintin; Cars 2; Kung Fu Panda 2; Rango; Rio

=== Television ===
==== Programs ====
Best Network Television Series	Best Syndicated/Cable Television Series
Fringe (Fox); A Gifted Man (CBS); Grimm (NBC); Once Upon a Time (ABC); Supernatural (The CW); Terra Nova (Fox)	Breaking Bad (AMC); American Horror Story (FX); The Closer (TNT); Dexter (Showtime); Leverage (TNT); True Blood (HBO)
Best Television Presentation	Best Youth-Oriented Television Series
The Walking Dead (AMC); Camelot (Starz); Falling Skies (TNT); Game of Thrones (HBO); The Killing (AMC); Torchwood: Miracle Day (Starz); Trek Nation (Science Channel)	Teen Wolf (MTV); Being Human (Syfy); Doctor Who (BBC America); The Nine Lives of Chloe King (ABC Family); The Secret Circle (The CW); The Vampire Diaries (The CW)

==== Acting ====
Best Actor on Television	Best Actress on Television
Bryan Cranston – Breaking Bad (AMC) as Walter White; Sean Bean – Game of Thrones (HBO) as Ned Stark; Michael C. Hall – Dexter (Showtime) as Dexter Morgan; Timothy Hutton – Leverage (TNT) as Nathan Ford; Dylan McDermott – American Horror Story (FX) as Ben Harmon; Noah Wyle – Falling Skies (TNT) as Tom Mason	Anna Torv – Fringe (Fox) as Olivia Dunham; Mireille Enos – The Killing (AMC) as Sarah Linden; Lena Headey – Game of Thrones (HBO) as Cersei Lannister; Jessica Lange – American Horror Story (FX) as Constance Langdon; Eve Myles – Torchwood: Miracle Day (Starz) as Gwen Cooper; Kyra Sedgwick – The Closer (TNT) as Brenda Leigh Johnson
Best Supporting Actor on Television	Best Supporting Actress on Television
Aaron Paul – Breaking Bad (AMC) as Jesse Pinkman; Giancarlo Esposito – Breaking Bad (AMC) as Gus Fring; Kit Harington – Game of Thrones (HBO) as Jon Snow; Joel Kinnaman – The Killing (AMC) as Stephen Holder; John Noble – Fringe (Fox) as Walter Bishop; Bill Pullman – Torchwood: Miracle Day (Starz) as Oswald Danes; Norman Reedus – The Walking Dead (AMC) as Daryl Dixon	Michelle Forbes – The Killing (AMC) as Mitch Larsen; Lauren Ambrose – Torchwood: Miracle Day (Starz) as Jilly Kitzinger; Jennifer Carpenter – Dexter (Showtime) as Debra Morgan; Frances Conroy – American Horror Story (FX) as Moira O'Hara; Lana Parrilla – Once Upon a Time (ABC) as Regina Mills; Beth Riesgraf – Leverage (TNT) as Parker
Best Guest Performer on Television
Tom Skerritt – Leverage (TNT) as Jimmy Ford; Steven Bauer – Breaking Bad (AMC) as Don Eladio Vuente; Orla Brady – Fringe (Fox) as Elizabeth Bishop; Mark Margolis – Breaking Bad (AMC) as Hector "Tio" Salamanca; Edward James Olmos – Dexter (Showtime) as James Gellar; Zachary Quinto – American Horror Story (FX) as Chad Warwick7

=== DVD ===
Best DVD Release	Best Special Edition DVD Release
Atlas Shrugged: Part I; The Perfect Host; 13; City of Life and Death; The Double; Kill the Irishman; The Reef	Giorgio Moroder Presents Metropolis; Citizen Kane (70th Anniversary Ultimate Collector’s Edition); Mimic (The Director’s Cut); The Phantom of the Opera (Blu-ray Disc version); The Rocketeer (20th Anniversary Edition); Willy Wonka & the Chocolate Factory (40th Anniversary Collector’s Edition)
Best DVD Collection	Best DVD Television Release
Stanley Kubrick: The Essential Collection (Full Metal Jacket, The Shining, Eyes Wide Shut, 2001: A Space Odyssey, Lolita, Stanley Kubrick: A Life in Pictures, Spartacus, A Clockwork Orange, Barry Lyndon and Dr. Strangelove); Jurassic Park Ultimate Trilogy (Jurassic Park, The Lost World: Jurassic Park and Jurassic Park III); The Lord of the Rings: The Motion Picture Trilogy (Extended Editions) (The Lord of the Rings: The Fellowship of the Ring, The Lord of the Rings: The Two Towers and The Lord of the Rings: The Return of the King); Star Wars: The Complete Saga (Star Wars Episode IV: A New Hope, The Empire Strikes Back, Return of the Jedi, Star Wars: Episode I – The Phantom Menace, Star Wars: Episode II – Attack of the Clones and Star Wars: Episode III – Revenge of the Sith); Superman: The Motion Picture Anthology, 1978-2006 (Superman, Superman II, Superman III, Superman IV: The Quest for Peace and Superman Returns)	Spartacus: Gods of the Arena; The Bionic Woman: Seasons 2 and 3; Camelot: The Complete First Season; Farscape: The Complete Series; Nikita: The Complete First Season; The Twilight Zone: Seasons 3–5

== Multiple nominations ==
=== Film ===
The following 22 films received multiple nominations:

- 10 nominations: Harry Potter and the Deathly Hallows – Part 2 and Hugo
- 8 nominations: Super 8
- 7 nominations: Captain America: The First Avenger
- 6 nominations: The Adventures of Tintin and Mission: Impossible – Ghost Protocol
- 5 nominations: Rise of the Planet of the Apes
- 4 nominations: The Skin I Live In, Take Shelter, and Thor
- 3 nominations: Immortals and Melancholia
- 2 nominations: The Adjustment Bureau, Another Earth, The Devil's Double, Fast Five, The Girl with the Dragon Tattoo, Midnight in Paris, Sherlock Holmes: A Game of Shadows, The Thing, War Horse, and X-Men: First Class

=== Television ===
The following 12 television series received multiple nominations:

- 6 nominations: Breaking Bad
- 5 nominations: American Horror Story
- 4 nominations: Dexter, Fringe, Game of Thrones. The Killing, Leverage, and Torchwood: Miracle Day
- 2 nominations: The Closer, Falling Skies, Once Upon a Time, and The Walking Dead
