= Planet of the Apes: Last Frontier =

2017 video game

- Developer: The Imaginati Studios
- Publishers: FoxNext; The Imaginarium; Creative England
- Series: Planet of the Apes
- Engine: Unreal Engine 4
- Platforms: PlayStation 4 Xbox One; Microsoft Windows
- Release: PlayStation 4 November 21, 2017; Xbox One, Microsoft Windows; August 24, 2018
- Genre: Interactive fiction
- Modes: Single-player; Multiplayer

Planet of the Apes: Last Frontier is a 2017 video game based on the Planet of the Apes franchise. Taking place between Dawn of the Planet of the Apes (2014) and War for the Planet of the Apes (2017), the game was announced by Andy Serkis during an interview on War. A PlayStation 4 version was released on November 21, 2017, and versions for the Xbox One and Microsoft Windows were also planned at that time, but didn't release until nearly a year later.

== Gameplay ==
Players control a cast of 14 humans and apes throughout the game, who can live or die based on their decisions. Like many decision-making narratives, there are multiple endings possible depending on what actions players take. There are 3 general endings to the game; apes win, humans win, or peace among the two. However, there are several endings within the 3 general scenarios depending on the characters that live and die, and the general choices made throughout.

Further, the game seeks to be an even closer intersection between games and films than similar products, such as Telltale titles. It will run between 2–3 hours and the player's only input will be entirely choice-based decisions. There are no puzzles, no exploration, nor any direct control over characters.

== Plot ==
Planet of the Apes: Last Frontier is notably set around a year after Dawn of the Planet of the Apes and is centered around a breakaway faction of apes who had previously been loyal to the renegade Koba. The faction takes refuge in the Rocky Mountains from the chaotic and still ongoing ape vs human war. However, the apes soon find themselves forced to descend into a human-owned valley as winter approaches and food is running low.

The game follows both apes and humans with the ape tribe being centered around a chimpanzee family consisting of the tribe's leader, Khan, and his 3 sons; Bryn, Tola, and Juno, along with Tola's gorilla brother-in-arms and Brutus and Khan's orangutan adviser Clarence. The humans are farmers and traders living in a small settlement built in the ruins of a former town. They follow Jess, the wife of their former, now deceased mayor.

Many apes died in the war with the Alpha-Omega soldiers of Colonel McCullough while others, fearing the extinction of their kind, fled to start a new life far away from San Francisco, Caesar, and the human soldiers. One of these new tribes was led by Khan, who lost his wife and led his apes far north. After many months of searching, Khan and his sons Tola, Bryn and Juno found a mountain that the tribe could call home. However, now that summer is ending, food is running out and the tribe is beginning to starve. As each day passes, food becomes scarcer, and the tribe's hunters have to venture farther away from the safety of their mountain.

Unknown to Khan and his troop of apes, nestled in the mountain valley floor, a human settlement has survived the Simian Flu apocalypse. A hundred souls live in a fortified compound, once the nucleus of a thriving town known as Millerton. Food is scarce and new mayor Jess Ross has to marshal her people as they struggle daily to make a life for Millerton. Times are hard with little communication from the outside, and the townsfolk must rely on their crops and cattle to survive the upcoming winter.

Soon the apes will come face to face with humans for the first time in their new home. The choices you make as leader will affect both groups as well as how you are perceived by your friends and your foes. Your decisions have consequences for the survival of ape and human alike.

== Development ==
Andy Serkis mentioned in October 2016 that War for the Planet of the Apes would be accompanied by a video game, for which he performed motion capture. In August 2017, the game has been announced as Planet of the Apes: Last Frontier, which released for the PlayStation 4, Xbox One and PC in fall 2017. In mid-September 2017 it was announced that the game would have a multiplayer aspect where several players could vote on the choices being made.

It was released for Xbox One and Microsoft Windows on August 24, 2018.

== Reception ==
On Metacritic, the PlayStation 4 version has a score of 59, indicating "Mixed or average reviews."
