= Dan Lemmon =

New Zealand visual effects supervisor

- Education: Brigham Young University
- Occupation: Visual effects artist
- Years active: 1997–present

Dan Lemmon is a New Zealand visual effects supervisor. In 2012, he was nominated for an Academy Award for the movie Rise of the Planet of the Apes. This was in the category of Academy Award for Best Visual Effects, his nomination was shared with Daniel Barrett, Joe Letteri and R. Christopher White.

His second nomination was at the 87th Academy Awards for the film Dawn of the Planet of the Apes. His nomination was shared with Letteri, Barrett, and Erik Winquist. He received his third nomination (and first win) at the 89th Academy Awards for The Jungle Book, together with Robert Legato, Adam Valdez, and Andrew R. Jones. His fourth nomination was at the 90th Academy Awards for the film War for the Planet of the Apes, together with Letteri, Barrett, and Joel Whist. His fifth nomination was at the 95th Academy Awards for the superhero film, The Batman, with Russell Earl, Anders Langlands and Dominic Tuohy.

== Early career ==
Lemmon graduated from Brigham Young University (BYU) and was one of the early students in the BYU Center for Animation. One of Lemmon's earliest credits was for modeling, coloring, lighting, and compositing work on Titanic.

== Filmography ==
- A Minecraft Movie (visual effects supervisor), 2025
- The Batman (visual effects supervisor), 2022
- War for the Planet of the Apes (visual effects supervisor), 2017
- The Jungle Book (visual effects supervisor: Weta Digital), 2016
- Dawn of the Planet of the Apes (visual effects supervisor), 2014
- Man of Steel (visual effects supervisor: Weta Digital), 2013
- Rise of the Planet of the Apes (visual effects supervisor), 2011
- Avatar (visual effects supervisor: Weta Digital), 2009
- Jumper (visual effects supervisor: Weta Digital), 2008
- Enchanted (visual effects supervisor: Weta Digital), 2007
- 30 Days of Night (visual effects supervisor), 2007
- Bridge to Terabithia (digital effects supervisor), 2007
- King Kong (digital effects supervisor), 2005
- I, Robot (CG supervisor: Weta Digital), 2004
- Van Helsing (computer graphics supervisor), 2004
- The Lord of the Rings: The Return of the King (3D sequence supervisor: Weta Digital), 2003
- The Lord of the Rings: The Two Towers (3D sequence lead technical director: Weta Digital), 2002
- We Were Soldiers (computer graphics supervisor: Digital Domain), 2002
- A Beautiful Mind (technical developer: Digital Domain), 2001
- The Lord of the Rings: The Fellowship of the Ring (technical developer: Digital Domain) 2001
- How the Grinch Stole Christmas (technical lead), 2000
- Supernova (digital artist), 2000
- Fight Club (digital artist: Digital Domain - as Daniel Lemmon), 1999
- Titanic (character integration artist: Digital Domain), 1997

== Awards and honors ==
=== Academy Awards ===
Year	Nominated work	Category	Result	Ref.
2012	Rise of the Planet of the Apes	Academy Award for Best Visual Effects	Nominated	
2015	Dawn of the Planet of the Apes	Academy Award for Best Visual Effects	Nominated	
2017	The Jungle Book	Academy Award for Best Visual Effects	Won	
2018	War for the Planet of the Apes	Academy Award for Best Visual Effects	Nominated	
2023	The Batman	Academy Award for Best Visual Effects	Nominated	
