= Koba (Planet of the Apes) =

Fictional character

- Planet of the Apes character
- Toby Kebbell as Koba in Dawn of the Planet of the Apes (2014)
- First appearance: Rise of the Planet of the Apes (2011)
- Last appearance: War for the Planet of the Apes (2017) (in Caesar's hallucinations)
- Created by: Rick Jaffa; Amanda Silver
- Adapted by: Mark Bomback; Matt Reeves
- Voiced by: Toby Kebbell
- Motion capture: Toby Kebbell (Dawn and War); Christopher Gordon (Rise)

In-universe information
- Species: Evolved Bonobo
- Occupation: Advisor and lieutenant to Caesar (formerly); Warlord

Koba is a fictional character in the rebooted 20th Century Fox's Planet of the Apes franchise. Koba is introduced in Rise of the Planet of the Apes, becomes the main antagonist of its sequel Dawn of the Planet of the Apes, and appears through visions to the protagonist Caesar in War for the Planet of the Apes. He was portrayed by Christopher Gordon in Rise and Toby Kebbell in Dawn and War.

A bonobo that was heavily abused and tortured by humans throughout his life, Koba is selected as the first recipient of the ALZ-113 virus, giving him enhanced intelligence, while harboring an immense grudge against humanity for their treatment of him. Unbeknownst to him, Koba is directly responsible for the virus spreading to humanity and destroying the population. After being rescued by Caesar, he becomes one of his right hand men in the colony. However, unable to suppress his hatred of humanity, he betrays Caesar to become dictator of the ape colony and wage war on a surviving group of humans in order to keep living out his sadistic fantasies.

Koba's character has been praised and cited as one of the best film villains of the 2010s.

== Fictional character biography ==
=== Rise of the Planet of the Apes (2011) ===
First appearing in Rise, Koba is a bonobo which led a life full of torture, abuse, and torment at the hands of humans. He is picked up by the company Gen-Sys to be part of a testing procedure for the ALZ-113 retrovirus developed by Will Rodman, in hopes of curing Alzheimer's. Koba impresses Rodman enough to undergo the procedure for the testing. He is mocked briefly by Rodman's superior, Steven Jacobs, by knocking on Koba's window as he is being strapped in for the procedure. Koba lies still long enough until he initiated a surprise attack that knocks handler Robert Franklin's mask off. While Koba is sedated, Franklin has breathed in enough of the 113 virus to become contaminated, which would begin the Simian Flu outbreak that caused humanity to die out. After the procedure, Koba shows off his newfound intelligence by writing Jacobs's name on a writing computer screen, taunting him while he plots his revenge. He is later freed from captivity by Caesar, and joins him in his attack on the Golden Gate Bridge. Koba is commanded by Caesar to lead an attack from above using the high wire supports. He notices that Steven Jacobs's helicopter has been attacked and has left him injured. With Caesar's permission, Koba goes over to the wreckage of the helicopter and pushes it over the edge of the bridge, killing Jacobs. Koba follows Caesar and the rest of the apes to Muir Woods Park, where he attacks Rodman, but is stopped by Caesar before he can kill him.

=== Firestorm ===
In this novel, set a few weeks after the first film, Koba works hard to prove his loyalty to Caesar, while also struggling with the painful memories of his past, which are now more vivid due to his enhanced intelligence.

Koba was born in an unnamed primate research facility, where he lived with his mother and their caregiver, Mary, who taught them Sign Language. When Koba was still young, his mother died defending him from an abusive, alcoholic handler named Roger. As a result of this incident, the facility's project funding was cut and Koba was sold to Tommy, an abusive TV producer. Tommy made Koba and his new chimpanzee friend, Milo, part of his TV show, Monkey of the House, and would electrocute or beat them whenever they displeased him. When Koba finally tried to defend himself from Tommy's abuse, Tommy punished the bonobo by scarring his face with a knife and blinding his eye with a lit cigarette. After Tommy committed suicide due to his show being cancelled, Koba and Milo attempted to escape, only to be captured and separated by animal control officers. Koba then became a victim of animal testing, and eventually met Steven Jacobs, whom he swore revenge on after the man repeatedly mocked him as an unintelligent animal.

=== Dawn of the Planet of the Apes (2014) ===
Ten years later, at the start of Dawn, Caesar and Koba are building their own civilization as humanity dies out. Koba becomes something of a brother to Caesar and is idolized by Caesar's son, Blue Eyes. Koba assists Caesar in saving Blue Eyes from a bear attack, and tells Blue Eyes not to be ashamed of his new scars from the encounter, as they show that he is strong. The next day, Koba and the other apes hear a gunshot ring throughout the forest and find Rocket's son Ash has been wounded by a group of humans with loaded guns. Caesar scares the humans into retreating, and orders Koba to follow them, where he finds a small civilization of humans that have survived the outbreak. When he returns, Koba insists on eradicating the humans for what they did to Ash and comes into conflict with Rocket for this, who insists that they must obey Caesar. Caesar and the apes march to the humans' settlement and claim that they do not want war, and that the humans must stay out of the ape's territory. Malcolm, one of the co-founders of the human's settlement, returns to the woods to make peace with Caesar in order to gain access to a hydroelectric generator at a dam in the ape's territory. Caesar allows the humans to work in the dam, granted they work unarmed, which infuriates Koba. Koba fears that if the humans get more power, they will become more dangerous, to which Caesar replies that once they finish their work they will leave. Angered, Koba points out all of his scars, referring to them as "human work". Caesar stands above Koba, who ashamedly seeks forgiveness from his king, and leaves.

The next day, Koba and two chimpanzees Grey and Stone, sneak off to San Francisco, claiming that he was off hunting. Koba observes that the humans have enough weaponry to wipe out the apes, and attempts to go and warn Caesar, but is caught by two human guards who threaten him. Koba plays dumb to catch them off guard and walks away. Koba returns to find that Caesar is at the dam with the humans. Koba arrives and attacks Malcolm's son, Alexander. Koba prepares to attack the boy again, but is interrupted by Maurice. Koba shouts for Caesar to come out, and confronts him about his tolerance of humans. Koba begins ranting that Caesar cares about humans more than about apes, and a fight between the two breaks out. Caesar nearly beats Koba to death for his insolence, but stops when he remembers his code that apes must not kill other apes. Koba again begs for Caesar's forgiveness, but secretly begins his plans to usurp him. Koba keeps the discovery of the guns a secret, and warns Blue Eyes that he fears for Caesar's safety due to the humans remaining in the apes' territory. Koba returns to the armory and is caught by the same two humans again. Koba again plays dumb before stealing a M4A1 assault rifle from them. Koba treats the weapon like a toy to mess with the humans before executing them both. The power is restored and the humans celebrate with the apes. Koba kills the human Carver, who had shot Ash and was flippant with the apes previously, and takes his hat and cigarette lighter as souvenirs. Koba returns to the village and has his followers set the village on fire. Koba then uses the rifle to seemingly kill Caesar, who stares right at him. Koba leaves the items he took from Carver at the scene of the shooting, framing him for killing Caesar and burning down the village. Koba wages war against the humans, claiming it to be in revenge for the death of Caesar and assuming leadership of the colony.

Koba charges into war with the rest of the male apes, killing many humans and leading to the deaths of many apes. Koba personally takes over a tank which is attacking the apes, and uses it to break down the door of the human sanctuary. Inside, Koba demands that Ash kill an unarmed man. Ash refuses, stating such an act goes against Caesar's teachings, and Koba angrily drags him up a flight of stairs and throws him off a balcony to his death. Koba insists that Caesar is dead, and the apes are to follow him. Koba orders all human survivors to be rounded up and taken prisoner, claiming that they will know life inside a cage, and imprisons Caesar's remaining sympathizers in a bus. Blue Eyes learns that Caesar is in fact alive, and frees the humans and apes loyalists from captivity singlehandedly.

Caesar and Koba face off at the top of the high-rise of the sanctuary. Koba taunts that the apes follow him now, and that he will win the war against the humans. Caesar claims that Koba was like a brother to him, while Koba argues that Caesar is a brother to the humans, and that Koba will free apes from tyranny. Caesar retorts that Koba engaged this war due to selfish reasoning, and that he belongs in a cage. After an explosion, Koba steals a machine gun and attempts to kill Caesar with it, killing another ape and also injuring Maurice in the process. Caesar furiously launches himself at Koba and the two apes tumble down a platform, leaving Koba dangling off the edge. Koba hypocritically pleads for his life and recites Caesar's rule of "Ape not kill ape", despite having killed apes himself. Caesar begins to pull Koba up, but denounces him as "not ape." before dropping a horrified Koba to his death.

=== War for the Planet of the Apes (2017) ===
By the beginning of War, Koba's actions have sparked a fully fledged war between the apes and the human survivors – the latter of whom are being led by a ruthless militant colonel, named J. Wesley McCullough. At some point, Koba appears as a hallucination to Caesar after the latter accidentally kills Winter, who had joined forces with McCullough out of fear. Koba's apparition tells Caesar "ape not kill ape", and Caesar learns that he had just broken that rule. Maurice compares Caesar to Koba at one point, citing his lust for revenge. Koba appears to Caesar again while he is being tortured, mocking Caesar and claiming that he cannot save the apes, and he should succumb to his injuries and join him in death. Eventually, however, Caesar succeeds in freeing the apes from human captivity and is later faced with the option of killing a defeated McCullough. Reluctant, Caesar leaves the path of Koba and spares McCullough, who takes his own life.

== Production ==
Despite not returning to direct the film, Rise of the Planet of the Apes director Rupert Wyatt expressed that he would like to see Koba become the main antagonist of the series for the future installments. Wyatt stated, "Whereas the story of the first film plays out as a fairy tale, the next film will play out as a Shakespearean scifi drama where you'll have Caesar as the leader of this revolution, but Koba would be the one leading his own troops wanting to wipe out humans in a genocide. But Caesar is more conflicted, and maybe Caesar needs Koba's assistance in terms of the conflict. And Maurice is his advisor and he's telling him to combine forces. Caesar needs the allegiance of the two, although he doesn't believe in what Koba believes in, which is complete genocide." The characters of Dreyfus, portrayed by Gary Oldman and Carver portrayed by Kirk Acevedo, are considered to be the human counterparts to Koba in the Dawn storyline. Koba's name is presumably inspired by Joseph Stalin's revolutionary pseudonym, Koba.

Kebbell had expressed interest in reprising the role for War for the Planet of the Apes. Plans were considered to bring Koba back, as the ending of Dawn had left the character's fate ambiguous, with Koba's breathing being heard at the end of the film. War screenwriter Mark Bomback eventually decided against a physical return for Koba, and instead decided that a spiritual return would be more suitable for the storyline. Bomback stated, "If you stayed until the very end of Dawn of the Planet of the Apes, you hear Koba's breathing. We did that to give us a tiny crack of a possibility that we could revive Koba if we wanted to. Very early on in spitballing, we realized there was nothing more to do with Koba—certainly nothing that would exceed what he had done in the last story. But we knew we wanted to keep him alive as an idea. In playing out the reality of what happened at the end of the last film, Caesar would be traumatized by having to kill his brother. That would have resonance, and we wanted to make sure that did not get lost. So the answer was that we could go inside Caesar's mind at this point and revisit Koba that way."

== Reception ==
Kebbell's performance as Koba in Dawn of the Planet of the Apes gained largely positive reviews. Many critics cited the character's sympathetic motivations due to his history of torture and abuse as a powerful character arc. Mark Hughes from Forbes stated that Kebbell's performance as Koba truly defined the film, and compared Kebbell's performance to that of Heath Ledger's as The Joker in The Dark Knight. ScreenRant ranked Koba as the second scariest science fiction monster of the 2010s, stating "Toby Kebbell's performance as the evil ape arguably surpassed Serkis' at times. Filled with unpredictability, Koba was the perfect foil to Caesar, who was defined by clear-headedness and a strong moral center." Koba has been seen as one of the best movie villains of the 2010s as well as one of the best accomplishments in CGI and motion capture performances.

Caesar is forced to take Koba's life at the end of the film, and thus breaking the rule of "ape not kill ape", has been compared on many occasions to Batman being forced to kill Harvey Dent at the end of The Dark Knight, with the main protagonist being forced to break their fundamental moral code in order to restore peace. Koba has also been referred to on many occasions as being similar in nature to the relationship between The Joker and Batman, with The Joker often being referred to as the polar opposite of Batman, while also being his exact equal. Koba is seen as being Caesar's equal, while also being a dark reflection of everything Caesar stands for. Caesar stands for prosperity and forgiveness, where Koba stands for chaos and vengeance. Mark Hughes from Forbes made many comparisons between Dawn of the Planet of the Apes and The Dark Knight in his review of Dawn, in one instance stating, "In The Dark Knight, those voices willing to take a chance at being destroyed in order to refuse to act against the other 'side' were able to ensure the survival of both ferries full of people trapped in the Joker's diabolical test. In Dawn of the Planet of the Apes, things take a rather different direction, as you of course already know must be the case for the film to progress and for the series to continue toward its destined outcome." Hughes stated earlier in the article while comparing the performances of Andy Serkis as Caesar, and Kebbell as Koba, "Serkis provides such depth as an actor, he asserts himself even though the visual stylings of computer animation that completely transforms him into an animated ape. Here, he manages to rival his previous best performance as Gollum in The Lord of the Rings trilogy, which is a testament to Serkis’ abilities as well as the visual effects. Which should tell you just how great Kebbell must be, then, if his Koba is comparable to what Ledger's Joker represented in The Dark Knight."

Dawn director Matt Reeves's next film project following War for the Planet of the Apes was a new interpretation of the Batman character, and he responded to the comparisons between the relationship between Caesar and Koba to that of Batman and the Joker stating, "I see this parallel between Caesar and Batman, really, which is this idea of these characters who are grappling with their own struggle and trying to do the right thing in an imperfect world and, so, I do really relate it to that kind of idea."
