= Sierra Nevada Zoological Park =

Zoo in Reno, Nevada, United States

- Interactive map of Sierra Nevada Zoological Park
- 39.6234°N 119.9092°W
- Date opened: 1989; 37 years ago
- Date closed: March 19, 2024
- Location: Reno, United States
- No. of species: 40
- Major exhibits: Big Cat Corner, Cavies Corner, Monkey Row, Petting Zoo, Reptile House

The Sierra Nevada Zoological Park, formerly the Sierra Safari Zoo, was a zoo north of Reno, Nevada, United States. Opening in 1989, it grew to become the zoo that housed more exotics in the state. The zoo housed a wide variety of exotic animals from around the world, including chimpanzees, gorillas, orangutans, big cats, reptiles, sloths, and others. The nonprofit zoo at times has received community support through in-kind donations such as meat from hunters to help support the animals in the zoo.

== In popular culture ==
The zoo is featured in the 2017 film War for the Planet of the Apes as the zoo that the character Bad Ape escapes from after his family and acquaintances are killed by the soldiers.
