= Devyn Dalton =

Canadian actress, stuntwoman, dancer and voiceover artist

Devyn Dalton is a Canadian actress, stuntwoman, dancer and voice over artist. Devyn has starred in Nickelodeon's A Fairly Odd Christmas as Christmas Carol and Escape from Mr. Lemoncello's Library as Gretel. In War for the Planet of the Apes, she played Cornelius, having played Cornelia (Cornelius's mother) in Rise of the Planet of the Apes.

Dalton also worked as a stunt double for Matt Damon in the 2026 film The Odyssey.

== Filmography ==
=== Film ===
Year	Title	Role	Notes
2005	Chasing Christmas	Alice	
2011	Rise of the Planet of the Apes	Cornelia	
2015	Barbie in Rock 'N Royals	Zia	Voice
2016	The Orchard	Trixy	
2017	War for the Planet of the Apes	Cornelius	
2021	Hypnotic	Tabby	
2024	The Electric State	Cosmo	
2026	The Odyssey	Odysseus	Stunt double

=== Television ===
Year	Title	Role	Notes
2012	A Fairly Odd Christmas	Christmas Carol Elf	Television film
2017	Legion	Angry Boy	5 episodes
2017–2018	Beyblade Burst Evolution	Shasa Guten	Voice, English dub; 31 episodes
2018–2019	My Little Pony: Friendship Is Magic	Ocellus	Voice, 15 episodes
2019	Legends of Tomorrow	Púca	2 episodes
