= War for the Planet of the Apes =

2017 film by Matt Reeves

- Theatrical release poster
- Directed by: Matt Reeves
- Written by: Mark Bomback; Matt Reeves
- Based on: Characters by Rick Jaffa Amanda Silver; Premise from Planet of the Apes by Pierre Boulle
- Produced by: Peter Chernin; Dylan Clark; Rick Jaffa; Amanda Silver
- Starring: Andy Serkis; Woody Harrelson; Steve Zahn
- Cinematography: Michael Seresin
- Edited by: William Hoy; Stan Salfas
- Music by: Michael Giacchino
- Production companies: 20th Century Fox; Chernin Entertainment
- Distributed by: 20th Century Fox
- Release dates: July 10, 2017 (SVA Theatre); July 14, 2017 (United States)
- Running time: 140 minutes
- Country: United States
- Language: English
- Budget: $150–190 million
- Box office: $490 million

War for the Planet of the Apes is a 2017 American science fiction action film directed by Matt Reeves, who co-wrote it with Mark Bomback. The sequel to Dawn of the Planet of the Apes (2014), it is the third installment in the Planet of the Apes reboot film series and the ninth film overall. It stars Andy Serkis alongside Woody Harrelson and Steve Zahn. The film concludes the story of Caesar as he sets out to avenge those he has lost in the war between apes and humans.

Development for War for the Planet of the Apes began in January 2014, after 20th Century Fox viewed Reeves's cut of its predecessor; his return was soon confirmed, along with Bomback's. A conditional 2016 release date was announced in May 2015, which led to a closer and faster pre-production relationship between writer and director. The film bears similarities to Battle for the Planet of the Apes (1973), with emphasis on the effect of psychosocial development and interaction of apes and humans. Casting began in August 2015 and finished that October, with principal photography commencing soon thereafter and concluding in March 2016, with filming locations including Lower Mainland and the Kananaskis Range.

War for the Planet of the Apes premiered on July 10, 2017, at the SVA Theatre in New York City, and was theatrically released worldwide by 20th Century Fox on July 14. A critical and commercial success, it grossed over $490 million, and received nominations for Best Visual Effects and Best Special Visual Effects at the 90th Academy Awards and 71st British Academy Film Awards, respectively. A standalone sequel, Kingdom of the Planet of the Apes, was released in 2024.

== Plot ==
Two years after the Battle of San Francisco, (Note: As depicted in Dawn of the Planet of the Apes (2014)) a U.S. Army battalion known as "Alpha-Omega" aided by enslaved apes derogatorily called "donkeys", searches for Caesar's ape colony. A platoon assaults an ape outpost, but the apes repel the attack and kill all but four humans and a donkey gorilla named Red. Caesar releases the human captives as a gesture of peace, but Red escapes after attacking Winter, an albino gorilla in Caesar's tribe. Caesar's older son Blue Eyes and Rocket return from a scouting expedition and report that they found an oasis that could serve as a safer home. That night, the Colonel of Alpha-Omega leads a team to raid the colony, killing Cornelia and Blue Eyes, mistaking the latter for Caesar. Cornelius, Caesar's younger son, survives the attack by hiding while the Colonel escapes.

Caesar, followed by Rocket, Maurice, and Luca, decide to serve as decoys while the tribe journeys to the oasis. In an abandoned village, Caesar kills a human in self-defense and finds his mute daughter, whom Maurice - with Caesar's consent - takes guardianship of, giving her a rag doll. They encounter Winter, now working for Alpha-Omega after giving away their hideout, faking the attack by Red, and letting him escape, and confront him. He reveals that the Colonel is heading north to meet up with the rest of the military forces. Caesar prevents him from alerting the soldiers, but accidentally kills Winter in retribution for his wife and son. As they follow the Colonel, Caesar's group discovers several dead soldiers executed by their own troops; a fatally wounded survivor is revealed to be mute, just like the girl.

Caesar's group chases someone who has stolen one of their horses and discovers the thief is another intelligent ape, Bad Ape, who grew up in isolation. He leads them to a former weapons depot-turned-quarantine facility in the mountains that serves as the militia's base. Soldiers kill Luca, and an enraged Caesar tells Maurice, Rocket, Bad Ape, and the mute girl to turn back. Caesar tries to infiltrate the base alone, but he finds his tribe captured and forced into labor there before Red catches him. Caesar deduces that the Colonel and militia are using the apes to barricade the facility to fend off the incoming military forces, which intend to attack rather than reinforce the militia.

The Colonel reveals that the Simian Flu virus has mutated, causing infected humans to devolve into primitive animals and lose their intelligence and ability to speak. After killing his infected son, he ordered his own troops to kill any carriers before they could infect others. This led to a conflict with his superiors, who believed the disease could still be cured, and were coming to forcibly relieve the Colonel of his command. The Colonel has Caesar tortured, starved, and leaves him exposed to the cold. The mute girl, whom Maurice names Nova, sneaks into the facility to feed Caesar. Rocket lets himself be captured to keep Nova from being seen, so he and Caesar can plan an escape. The Colonel later confiscates the doll Nova left for Caesar, but the other apes escape via an underground tunnel.

The military arrives and attacks the facility, and the apes are caught in the crossfire. During the chaos, Caesar sneaks into the Colonel's quarters to kill him, only to find that the virus has infected him after handling Nova's doll. Caesar refuses to kill the Colonel, instead allowing him to kill himself. Caesar then attempts to destroy a fuel tank but is wounded by Preacher, a sergeant he released earlier, with a crossbow. At the sight of the apes being killed, Red redeems himself by killing Preacher with a grenade launcher before being executed. Caesar blows the fuel tank, causing an avalanche that buries both armies as he flees up the trees with the rest of the apes and Nova.

The apes and Nova resume their journey to the oasis. As they arrive, Maurice discovers Caesar's wound and promises that Cornelius will know who his father was and what he did for the apes. With his colony safe in their new home, Caesar passes away peacefully.

== Cast ==
=== Apes ===
- Andy Serkis as Caesar, a chimpanzee who is the leader to the tribe of enhanced apes
- Steve Zahn as Bad Ape, a chimpanzee who fled from the Sierra Safari Zoo after seeing his family and acquaintances being blamed for the Simian flu and killed by soldiers
- Toby Kebbell as Koba, a treacherous bonobo whose abusive past caused him to develop a vendetta towards humans and is responsible for the war. He appears to Caesar as a hallucination
- Judy Greer as Cornelia, Caesar's chimpanzee wife
- Karin Konoval as Maurice, a Bornean orangutan and Caesar's loyal adviser and friend
- Terry Notary as Rocket, Caesar's loyal chimpanzee lieutenant
- Michael Adamthwaite as Luca, a western lowland gorilla and the chief commander of the gorilla guards in Caesar's tribe
- Ty Olsson as Red, a western lowland gorilla who was a follower of Koba, and now works for Alpha-Omega as a "donkey"
- Devyn Dalton as Cornelius, the younger chimpanzee son of Caesar and Cornelia
- Sara Canning as Lake, Blue Eyes' young chimpanzee wife
- Aleks Paunovic as Winter, an albino western lowland gorilla in Caesar's tribe, who later joins forces with Alpha-Omega out of cowardice
- Max Lloyd-Jones as Blue Eyes, the young chimpanzee son of Caesar and Cornelia
- Alessandro Juliani as Spear, a chimpanzee warrior in Caesar's tribe
- Timothy Webber as Percy, a Bornean orangutan elder in Caesar's tribe

=== Humans ===
- Woody Harrelson as Colonel J. Wesley McCullough (billed simply as "The Colonel"), the vicious leader of the Alpha-Omega paramilitary battalion. The militia employs around 400 militarized people, who remain confident as humanity's last bastion under the leadership of the Colonel
- Gabriel Chavarria as Preacher, a crossbowman and sergeant in the Alpha-Omega militia
- Amiah Miller as Nova, a mute but virtuous orphan who Maurice adopts
- Roger Cross as Rod Wilson, a captain from the Alpha-Omega platoon
- Mercedes De La Zerda as Private Lang, a soldier whose life is spared after the platoon assault failed and the survivors were captured. Later, she participates in the infiltration team at that night
- Chad Rook as Private Boyle, a soldier from the quarantine facility who sees the construction of the defensive wall

== Production ==
=== Development ===
Matt Reeves, Andy Serkis and Dylan Clark at New York Comic Con 2016 for the War for the Planet of the Apes panel

After seeing his cut of Dawn, 20th Century Fox and Chernin Entertainment signed Matt Reeves to return as director for a third installment of the reboot series. In January 2014, the studio announced the third film, with Reeves returning to direct and co-write along with Bomback, and Peter Chernin, Rick Jaffa and Amanda Silver serving as producers. During an interview in mid-November 2014 with MTV, Andy Serkis said they did not know the next film's setting. "...It could be five years after the event. It could be the night after the events of where we left Dawn." In May 2015, the title was first given as War of the Planet of the Apes. By October 2015, it had been retitled as War for the Planet of the Apes. When director Reeves and screenwriter Bomback came on board to helm Dawn, the film already had a release date, which led to an accelerated production schedule. However, with the third installment, Fox wanted to give the duo plenty of time to write and make the film. Taking advantage of this, the two bonded with each other more than before.

In interviews for Dawn, Reeves talked about the inevitable war Caesar would have with the humans: "As this story continues, we know that war is not avoided by the end of Dawn. That is going to take us into the world of what he is grappling with. Where he is going to be thrust into circumstances that he never, ever wanted to deal with, and was hoping he could avoid. And now he is right in the middle of it. The things that happen in that story test him in huge ways, in the ways in which his relationship with Koba haunts him deeply. It's going to be an epic story. I think you've probably read that I sort of described it where in the first film was very much about his rise from humble beginnings to being a revolutionary. The second movie was about having to rise to the challenge of being a great leader in the most difficult of times. This is going to be the story that is going to cement his status as a seminal figure in ape history, and sort of leads to an almost biblical status. He is going to become like a mythic ape figure, like Moses."

Toby Kebbell, who portrayed Koba in Dawn, had expressed interest in reprising his role or performing as other characters. Plans to include Koba in a larger role in the film were abandoned early, with Bomback saying, "If you stayed until the very end of Dawn of the Planet of the Apes, you hear Koba's breathing. We did that to give us a tiny crack of a possibility that we could revive Koba if we wanted to. Very early on in spitballing, we realized there was nothing more to do with Koba—certainly nothing that would exceed what he had done in the last story. But we knew we wanted to keep him alive as an idea. In playing out the reality of what happened at the end of the last film, Caesar would be traumatized by having to kill his brother. That would have resonance, and we wanted to make sure that did not get lost. So the answer was that we could go inside Caesar's mind at this point and revisit Koba that way."

=== Casting ===
In August 2015, Deadline reported that Gabriel Chavarria had been cast as one of the humans in the film. In September 2015, The Hollywood Reporter announced that Woody Harrelson had been cast as the film's antagonist, and that Chavarria's role was supporting. In October 2015, TheWrap reported that Steve Zahn was cast as a new ape in the film. It was also announced that actress Amiah Miller was cast as one of the film's humans, with Judy Greer and Karin Konoval reprising their roles as Cornelia and Maurice, while Aleks Paunovic and Sara Canning were cast as new apes.

=== Filming ===
Principal photography on the film began on October 14, 2015, in the Lower Mainland in Vancouver, under the working title Hidden Fortress. Filming was expected to take place there until early March 2016. Parts of the film were expected to shoot for up to five days in the Kananaskis in late January and early February. In March, Serkis confirmed that he had finished shooting his portions.

=== Visual effects ===
As with Rise and Dawn, the visual effects for War were created by Weta Digital; the apes were created with a mixture of motion-capture and CGI key-frame animation, as they were performed in motion-capture technology and animated in CGI.

== Influences ==
At New York Comic Con 2016, Reeves explained that he and Bomback were influenced by many films before writing. He said, "One of the first things that Mark and I did because we had just finished Dawn was that we decided to watch a million movies. We decided to do what people fantasize what Hollywood screenwriters get to do but no one actually does. We got Fox to give us a theater and we watched movie after movie. We watched every Planet of the Apes movie, war movies, westerns, Empire Strikes Back... We just thought, 'We have to pretend we have all the time in the world,' even though we had limited time. We got really inspired." According to Reeves, the treacherous apes being nicknamed "donkeys" is both a reference to the video game character Donkey Kong and the fact that they are used as "pack mules".

Additionally, during production, Reeves and Bomback sought broader inspirations from films like The Bridge on the River Kwai and The Great Escape. Feeling that there was a need to imbue Biblical themes and elements, they also watched Biblical epics like Ben-Hur and The Ten Commandments. The influences and inspirations were made evident in the relationship between Caesar and Woody Harrelson's Colonel, a military leader with pretensions toward godhood. Reeves has compared their relationship to the dynamic between Alec Guinness's British Commander and Sessue Hayakawa's prison camp Colonel in Bridge on the River Kwai. Another comparison is in Caesar's journey to find the Colonel, flanked by a posse of close friends—a situation Reeves explicitly tied to Clint Eastwood's war-weary soldier in The Outlaw Josey Wales. Influences from the film Apocalypse Now, notably Harrelson's character and his Alpha-Omega faction being similar to Colonel Kurtz's renegade army, were also noted by several journalists. Harrelson has also acknowledged the similarities and inspiration.

== Music ==
On October 17, 2015, it was confirmed that Reeves' frequent collaborator Michael Giacchino, who composed its predecessor, would return to score for War for the Planet of the Apes. For Caesar, Giacchino had written a few themes that would focus on the character's emotional side, with Reeves' idea on turning Caesar into a sort of "mythical and historical character" and referred him to Exodus or Moses. Several themes were created on the character dynamics, his relationship with Nova and a theme for Colonel, had been produced into that process. The soundtrack was digitally released to iTunes and Amazon on July 14, 2017, and in its physical form by Sony Classical Records on July 28, 2017.

== Release ==
War for the Planet of the Apes was initially set to be released on July 29, 2016, but in January 2015, Fox postponed the film's release date to about a year later on July 14, 2017.

=== Marketing ===
Special behind-the-scenes footage for the film was aired on TV on November 22, 2015, as part of a contest announcement presented by director Matt Reeves and Andy Serkis. The footage aired during The Walking Dead on AMC. The announcement allowed winners to wear a performance-capture suit and appear in a scene as an ape. The announcement was released on 20th Century Fox's official YouTube page later the same day.

At a New York Comic Con special event on October 6, 2016, Reeves, Serkis and producer Dylan Clark debuted an exclusive look at the film.

Serkis has also mentioned that the film would be accompanied by a video game, for which he performed motion capture. Titled Planet of the Apes: Last Frontier, the game was released for the PlayStation 4, Xbox One and PC in fall 2017.

== Reception ==
=== Box office ===
War for the Planet of the Apes grossed $146.9 million in the United States and Canada and $343.8 million in other territories for a worldwide total of $490.7 million, against a production budget of $150–190 million.

In North America, the film was projected to gross $50–60 million in its opening weekend; however, given its acclaimed status and strong word-of-mouth, rival studios believed the film had the potential to debut as high as $70–80 million. War was closely monitored by analysts while the summer was witnessing a decline in ticket sales, a situation that they blamed on franchise fatigue for an overabundance of sequels and reboots (such as Pirates of the Caribbean: Dead Men Tell No Tales, Transformers: The Last Knight and The Mummy). However, box office analysts noted that well-reviewed films have tended to perform in-line with estimates (Guardians of the Galaxy Vol. 2, Wonder Woman and Spider-Man: Homecoming). The film grossed $5 million from Thursday night previews at 3,021 theaters, up 22% from the $4.1 million earned by its predecessor, and $22.1 million on its first day. It went on to debut to $56.3 million, topping the box office, albeit with a 22% drop from Dawn's $72.6 million debut. In its second weekend, the film grossed $20.9 million (a drop of 62.9%, more than the 50.1% fall Dawn saw), finishing 4th at the box office. In its third weekend, the film made $10.5 million (dropping another 49.9%), finishing 6th at the box office. It was lower than the third weeks of both Rise ($16.1 million) and Dawn ($16.8 million).

=== Critical response ===
On the review aggregator website Rotten Tomatoes, 94% of 365 critics' reviews are positive, with an average rating of 8.2/10. The website's consensus reads: "War for the Planet of the Apes combines breathtaking special effects and a powerful, poignant narrative to conclude this rebooted trilogy on a powerful — and truly blockbuster — note." Metacritic, which uses a weighted average, assigned the film a score of 82 out of 100, based on 50 critics, indicating "universal acclaim". Audiences polled by CinemaScore gave the film an average grade of "A−" on an A+ to F scale.

War for the Planet of the Apes received praise for the cast's performances (particularly Serkis'), Reeves' direction, visual effects, musical score, cinematography and its morally complex storyline. Scott Collura of IGN awarded the film a score of 9.5 out of 10, saying: "War for the Planet of the Apes is an excellent closing act to this rebooted trilogy, but also one that does enough world-building that the series can potentially continue from here—and it's a rare case where, after three movies, we're left wanting more." A. O. Scott of The New York Times said of the film, "War for the Planet of the Apes, directed by Matt Reeves, is the grimmest episode so far, and also the strongest, a superb example—rare in this era of sloppily constructed, commercially hedged cinematic universes—of clear thinking wedded to inventive technique in popular filmmaking," and lauded Andy Serkis's performance in the film, stating that "Andy Serkis's performance as Caesar is one of the marvels of modern screen acting."

Peter Travers of Rolling Stone gave the film three and a half out of four stars, and said that Serkis performed "with a resonant power and depth of feeling that's nearly Shakespearean. Oscar, get busy: Serkis deserves the gold," and went on to say that "War for the Planet of the Apes—No. 9 in the simian cinema canon—is the best of the Apes films since the 1968 original."

Eric Kohn of IndieWire gave the film a B+ rating, and praised Matt Reeves's directing, saying "It's a given that an expensive 21st-century sci-fi movie with talking animals, exploding tanks, and jarring machine guns would look and sound great, but Reeves applies these effects with such a measured strategy that they're always working in service of a greater narrative agenda." Kohn went on to applaud the visuals and musical score, stating that "The breathlessly paced montage of flying bullets and angry monkeys raining down on terrified men, aided by Michael Giacchino's vibrant score, is a strong indicator of the next-level craftsmanship that distinguishes these movies from so many cacophonous Hollywood spectacles; not only is the action easy to follow, but you care for the motion-captured characters at the center of it, while the humans cower in fear."

=== Home media ===
War for the Planet of the Apes was released on Digital HD on October 10, 2017, and on Blu-ray and DVD on October 24, 2017, by 20th Century Fox Home Entertainment.

=== Accolades ===
Accolades received by War for the Planet of the Apes
Award	Date of ceremony	Category	Recipients	Result	Ref.
Academy Awards	March 4, 2018	Best Visual Effects	Daniel Barrett, Dan Lemmon, Joe Letteri, and Joel Whist	Nominated	
Annie Awards	February 3, 2018	Outstanding Achievement for Character Animation in a Live Action Production	Daniel Barrett, Sidney Kombo-Kintombo, Emile Ghorayeb, Luisma Lavin Peredo, and Alessandro Bonora	Won	
Art Directors Guild	January 27, 2018	Excellence in Production Design for a Fantasy Film	James Chinlund	Nominated	
British Academy Film Awards	February 18, 2018	Best Special Visual Effects	Daniel Barrett, Dan Lemmon, Joe Letteri, and Joel Whist	Nominated	
Chicago Film Critics Association	December 12, 2017	Best Original Score	Michael Giacchino	Nominated	
Critics' Choice Movie Awards	January 11, 2018	Best Action Movie	War for the Planet of the Apes	Nominated	
Critics' Choice Movie Awards	January 11, 2018	Best Visual Effects	War for the Planet of the Apes	Won	
Georgia Film Critics Association	January 12, 2018	Best Actor	Andy Serkis	Nominated	
Georgia Film Critics Association	January 12, 2018	Best Original Score	Michael Giacchino	Nominated	
Golden Reel Awards	February 18, 2018	Outstanding Achievement in Sound Editing – Dialogue / ADR	various (Note: Supervising Sound Editors: Douglas Murray, Will Files; Supervising Dialogue Editor: R.J. Kizer; Vocal Editors: Kim Foscato, P.K. Hooker, Doug Jackson, Lindsay Alvarez; ADR Editors: Laura Graham, and Jim Brookshire)	Won	
Golden Reel Awards	February 18, 2018	Outstanding Achievement in Sound Editing – Effects / Foley	various (Note: Supervising Sound Editors: Douglas Murray, Will Files; Sound Effects Editors: David Grimaldi, Jack Whittaker, Ken McGill, P.K. Hooker, Doug Jackson, Lindsay Alvarez; Foley Editors: John Morris, Matthew Harrison, Thom Brennan, Willard Overstreet; Foley Artists: Dan O'Connell, and John T. Cucci)	Nominated	
Golden Trailer Awards	June 6, 2017	Best Motion/Title Graphics	War for the Planet of the Apes: 20th Century Fox, Wild Card	Nominated	
Golden Trailer Awards	June 6, 2017	Best Summer 2017 Blockbuster TV Spot	War for the Planet of the Apes: 20th Century Fox, Wild Card	Nominated	
Hollywood Film Awards	November 5, 2017	Hollywood Visual Effects Award	Dan Barrett, Dan Lemmon, Joe Letteri, and Erik Winquist	Won	
Hollywood Post Alliance	November 16, 2017	Outstanding Visual Effects - Feature Film	Dan Barrett, Anders Langlands, Dan Lemmon, Joe Letteri, Luke Millar, Erik Winquist, and Weta Digital	Won	
Houston Film Critics Society	January 6, 2018	Best Actor	Andy Serkis	Nominated	
Houston Film Critics Society	January 6, 2018	Best Original Score	Michael Giacchino	Nominated	
Houston Film Critics Society	January 6, 2018	Best Visual Effects	War for the Planet of the Apes	Nominated	
International Film Music Critics Association Awards	February 22, 2018	Score of the Year	Michael Giacchino	Nominated	
International Film Music Critics Association Awards	February 22, 2018	Best Original Score for a Fantasy/Science Fiction/Horror Film	Michael Giacchino	Won	
International Film Music Critics Association Awards	February 22, 2018	Film Music Composition of the Year	"End Credits" from War for the Planet of the Apes by Michael Giacchino	Won	
San Diego Film Critics Society	December 11, 2017	Best Visual Effects	War for the Planet of the Apes	Won	
San Francisco Film Critics Circle	December 10, 2017	Best Actor	Andy Serkis	Won	
San Francisco Film Critics Circle	December 10, 2017	Best Original Score	Michael Giacchino	Nominated	
Satellite Awards	February 10, 2018	Best Film Editing	William Hoy	Won	
Satellite Awards	February 10, 2018	Best Original Score	Michael Giacchino	Nominated	
Satellite Awards	February 10, 2018	Best Sound	War for the Planet of the Apes	Nominated	
Satellite Awards	February 10, 2018	Best Visual Effects	War for the Planet of the Apes	Nominated	
Saturn Awards	June 27, 2018	Best Science Fiction Film	Peter Chernin, Dylan Clark, Rick Jaffa and Amanda Silver	Nominated	
Saturn Awards	June 27, 2018	Best Director	Matt Reeves	Nominated	
Saturn Awards	June 27, 2018	Best Actor	Andy Serkis	Nominated	
Saturn Awards	June 27, 2018	Best Special Effects	Joe Letteri, Dan Lemmon, Daniel Barrett and Joel Whist	Nominated	
Screen Actors Guild Awards	January 21, 2018	Outstanding Performance by a Stunt Ensemble in a Motion Picture	War for the Planet of the Apes	Nominated	
Seattle Film Critics Society	December 18, 2017	Best Original Score	Michael Giacchino	Nominated	
Seattle Film Critics Society	December 18, 2017	Best Visual Effects	Joe Letteri, Dan Lemmon, Dan Barrett, and Joel Whist	Won	
Teen Choice Awards	August 13, 2017	Choice Movie: Summer	20th Century Fox	Nominated	
Visual Effects Society Awards	February 13, 2018	Outstanding Visual Effects in a Photoreal Feature	Joe Letteri, Ryan Stafford, Daniel Barrett, Dan Lemmon, Joel Whist	Won	
Visual Effects Society Awards	February 13, 2018	Outstanding Animated Character in a Photoreal Feature	Eteuati Tema, Aidan Martin, Florian Fernandez, Mathias Larserud for "Bad Ape"	Nominated	
Visual Effects Society Awards	February 13, 2018	Outstanding Animated Character in a Photoreal Feature	Dennis Yoo, Ludovic Chailloleau, Douglas McHale, Tim Forbes for "Caesar"	Won	
Visual Effects Society Awards	February 13, 2018	Outstanding Created Environment in a Photoreal Feature	Chris McLaughlin, Ryan Salcombe, Seungjin Woo, Francesco Dell'Anna for "Hidden Fortress"	Nominated	
Visual Effects Society Awards	February 13, 2018	Outstanding Created Environment in a Photoreal Feature	Phillip Leonhardt, Paul Harris, Jeremy Fort, Thomas Lo for "Prison Camp"	Nominated	
Visual Effects Society Awards	February 13, 2018	Outstanding Effects Simulations in a Photoreal Feature	David Caeiro Cebrian, Johnathan Nixon, Chet Leavai, Gary Boyle	Won	
Visual Effects Society Awards	February 13, 2018	Outstanding Compositing in a Photoreal Feature	Christoph Salzmann, Robin Hollander, Ben Morgan, Ben Warner	Won	
Washington D.C. Area Film Critics Association	December 8, 2017	Best Motion Capture Performance	Andy Serkis	Won	
Washington D.C. Area Film Critics Association	December 8, 2017	Best Motion Capture Performance	Steve Zahn	Nominated	

== Sequel ==
According to screenwriter Rick Jaffa, a version of the spaceship from the 1968 Planet of the Apes under the name Icarus was in Rise of the Planet of the Apes (2011) as a deliberate hint to a possible sequel readapting the events of the original film, something the end of War also implies, featuring a younger version of the character Nova. During an interview of Andy Serkis with MTV in mid-November 2014, Serkis talked about possible sequels: "It might be three films, It could be four. It could be five. Who knows? The journey will continue." By October 2016, it was reported that a fourth Planet of the Apes film was being discussed.

Shortly before the release of War in July 2017, Reeves said that he expressed interest in making more Apes films and that Steve Zahn, who played Bad Ape in the film, had set up a story for further sequels. Writer Mark Bomback hinted that more films would be possible, saying, "Truthfully, we haven't had those kinds of conversations. I've been working on these films for about seven years now. I'm ready to take a breather and let things rest a bit."

In April 2019, following the acquisition of 21st Century Fox by Disney, Disney announced that future Planet of the Apes films are in development. It was also confirmed in August 2019 that any future installments would take place in the same universe first established in Rise. That December, it was reported that Wes Ball would write and direct the then-untitled Planet of the Apes film. In February 2020, it was reported that the film will be produced by Joe Hartwick Jr. and David Starke. Later that same day, Ball confirmed that he would be directing the film and that it was set after the events of War, following "Caesar's legacy".

In May 2020, Ball revealed that Josh Friedman wrote the screenplay, while Jaffa and Silver returned as producers. He also said that, while the film will be set in the same universe as Rise, it is not a direct sequel to War, saying that the film "will feel" like a follow-up to the overall Rise trilogy, but at the same time, the filmmakers will "do some really cool new stuff". Ball also said that the film could begin virtual production soon despite the COVID-19 pandemic due to it being a mostly CGI film. In a March 2022 interview with The Hollywood Reporter, 20th Century Studios president Steve Asbell stated that production would start between the late summer or early fall of 2022.

In August 2022, Owen Teague was cast in the lead role. The following month, the title was announced to be Kingdom of the Planet of the Apes, Freya Allan was cast as the human lead with Peter Macon co-starring, and the film was confirmed to be released in 2024. Production for the film began in October 2022 in Sydney at Disney Studios Australia.
