= Michael B. Silver =

American actor

- Born: Michael Buchman Silver; July 8, 1967 (age 58); New York City, New York, U.S.
- Occupation: Actor
- Years active: 1993–present
- Spouse: Katie Mitchell (m. 2000)
- Children: 1
- Relatives: Amanda Silver (sister); Sidney Buchman (grandfather)

Michael Buchman Silver (born July 8, 1967) is an American actor. He is perhaps best known for his recurring role as Assistant District Attorney Leo Cohen in the television series NYPD Blue. As of summer 2019, Silver has recurring roles on both NBC's The InBetween and CBS' Instinct.

== Early life ==
Silver was born in New York City, the brother of writer Amanda Silver and the grandson of Oscar-winning screenwriter Sidney Buchman. Silver is a graduate of Brown University.

== Career ==
One of his earliest roles was in the 1993 film Jason Goes to Hell: The Final Friday. He had a major recurring stint on NYPD Blue, perhaps his best-known role, appearing in 31 episodes. Silver has also had recurring roles as Dr. Paul Myers on ER and as Secret Service Agent Peter Elliott on CSI: Miami. In addition, Silver has made many other guest appearances on various primetime series such as Star Trek: Deep Space Nine, The X-Files, Cheers, NewsRadio, Judging Amy, Once and Again, Felicity, Law & Order, Monk, Dark Blue, Bones, Vengeance Unlimited, Criminal Minds, Raising the Bar, Strong Medicine, Nip/Tuck, Veronica Mars, Brothers & Sisters, Murder in the First, and Supernatural. He had a recurring role on Royal Pains as Ken Keller, and in 2011 he starred in the video game L.A. Noire as Edgar Kalou.

Beginning in the summer of 2018 and then in its second season in the summer of 2019, Michael had the recurring role of police sergeant Kanter Harris in the police procedural Instinct. In the summer of 2019, he was also appearing in the recurring role of professional therapist Brian Currie in the series The InBetween. In October 2021, he played Vince Jones (S5/E4 - "Sentinel") in the series S.W.A.T. (2017 TV series).

== Personal life ==
He was married to actress Katie Mitchell on October 22, 2000. He has one son.

== Filmography ==
=== Film ===
Year	Title	Role	Notes
1993	Jason Goes to Hell: The Final Friday	Luke	
1995	Higher Learning	Frat Member	
1995	Virtuosity	Undercover Cop	
1996	Eye for an Eye	Assistant	
1998	All of It	Ben Glazer	
1998	Playing by Heart	Max	
2000	Seven Girlfriends	Joe	
2000	In the Weeds	Marlon	
2000	Submerged	Dr. Winslow	
2001	Legally Blonde	Bobby	
2001	I Am Sam	Dr. Jaslow	
2003	Chatroom	Stud	Short film
2003	Seabiscuit	Baltimore Doctor	
2006	Unbeatable Harold	Father	
2010	Love Shack	Jerry Sphincter	Also director, writer & producer
2011	JoAnne	Man	Short film
2013	Leave of Absence	Dan Collins	
2013	Crystal Lake Memories: The Complete History of Friday the 13th	Himself	Documentary film
2015	Larry Gaye: Renegade Male Flight Attendant	Geddes	
2016	The Interrogation	Detective	Short film, also director
2018	Rumor from Ground Control	Baxter Aleks	
2018	The Samuel Project	Robert	

=== Television ===
Year	Title	Role	Notes
1991	Designing Women	Mark	Episode: "My Daughter, Myself"
1992	Cheers	Customer	Episode: "Teaching with the Enemy"
1993	Civil Wars	Dr. Blum	Episode: "A Liver Runs Through It"
1994	Star Trek: Deep Space Nine	Vinod	Episode: "Paradise"
1994	The Enemy Within	Lieutenant Lonner	Television film
1994	The Adventures of Young Indiana Jones: Hollywood Follies	Tony Lewis	Television film
1995	Blossom	David	Episode: "Mating Rituals"
1995–2009	ER	Dr. Paul Myers	12 episodes
1996–2004	NYPD Blue	ADA Leo Cohen	31 episodes
1996	Step by Step	Fleming Adler	Episode: "Guess Who's Coming to Dinner?"
1996	Bloodhounds	Trooper	Television film
1996	The John Larroquette Show	Scott	Episode: "Intern Writer"
1997	The Burning Zone	Freddy	Episode: "Death Song"
1997	The Pretender	Chris Rockwell	Episode: "Jaroldo!"
1997	Life with Roger	Steve	Episode: "Dial M for Muffin"
1997	Leaving L.A.	Officer Williams	Episode: "The Eyes of the City"
1998	NewsRadio	Danny	Episode: "Big Brother"
1998	Fantasy Island	Doug	Episode: "Superfriends"
1998	The X-Files	Howard Grodin	2 episodes
1998	Nothing Sacred	Hank	Episode: "Holy Words"
1999	Vengeance Unlimited	Michael Dearborn	Episode: "Legalese"
1999	Strange World	Agent Stern	Episode: "Spirit Falls"
1999	Judging Amy	Justin Hopkins	Episode: "The Persistence of Tectonics"
2000	Wilder Days	David	Episode: "Pilot"
2001	Once and Again	Paul	2 episodes
2001	The Fugitive	Dr. Augustine	Episode: "Flesh and Blood"
2001	Special Unit 2	Rich Talridge	Episode: "The Waste"
2001	Family Law	Mr. Michaels	Episode: "Moving On"
2001	Providence	Ken	Episode: "Civil Unrest"
2002	Felicity	Michael	Episode: "The Paper Chase"
2002	For the People	Will Campbell	
2002	CSI: Crime Scene Investigation	CSI Prosecutor	Episode: "The Accused is Entitled"
2002	The Big Time	Walt Kaplan	Television film
2002	Law & Order	Raymond Berman	Episode: "Hitman"
2003	The District	Lawyer	Episode: "Goodbye, Jenny"
2003	Monk	Lyle Turrow	Episode: "Mr. Monk Goes to the Ballgame"
2003	Skin	Detective	4 episodes
2003	Vegas Dick	Slick	Television pilot
2004–2006	CSI: Miami	Agent Peter Elliott	7 episodes
2004	Century City	James	Episode: "Love and Games"
2004	CSI: NY	EMT	Episode: "Outside Man"
2004	Strong Medicine	Ed Davis	Episode: "Code"
2005	Cold Case	Rick	Episode: "Ravaged"
2005	Beautiful People	David Stein	5 episodes
2005	Nip/Tuck	Mandy Baerwitz	Episode: "Rhea Reynolds"
2006	Bones	Dr. Anton Kostov	Episode: "The Woman at the Airport"
2006	Criminal Minds	Sam Shapiro	Episode: "Riding the Lightning"
2006	Love Monkey	Danny Stone	Episode: "Coming Out"
2006	Day Break	Nathan Baxter	4 episodes
2006–2007	Veronica Mars	Professor David Winkler	3 episodes
2006–2007	Shark	Dan Lauter	4 episodes
2007	Without a Trace	Dr. Ron Hillman	Episode: "Primed"
2007	Eyes	ADA Dan Henderson	Episode: "Burglary"
2007	Supernatural	Martin "Marty" Flagg	Episode: "Hollywood Babylon"
2007	Cane	Dr. Shapiro	2 episodes
2007	Marlowe	Charles DiFrisco	Television pilot
2007–2008	Las Vegas	Steve Lavin	4 episodes
2008	In Plain Sight	Arlo Meyers	Episode: "Hoosier Daddy"
2008	Eli Stone	Elliott Russell	2 episodes
2008–2009	Brothers & Sisters	Stu Orenbacher	2 episodes
2009	The Hustler	Travis' Father	2 episodes
2009	Lie to Me	Attorney	Episode: "Depraved Heart"
2009	Heroes	Liam Samuels	Episode: "Chapter Twelve: An Invisible Thread"
2009	Mental	Richard Ranier	Episode: "A Beautiful Delusion"
2009	Dark Blue	Edward Sykes	Episode: "Venice Kings"
2009	U.S. Attorney	Walter Bertram	Television pilot
2009	Raising the Bar	Andy Zeitlan	Episode: "Happy Ending"
2010–2016	Royal Pains	Ken Keller	13 episodes
2010	The Mentalist	Julius Coles	Episode: "The Blood on His Hands"
2010	The Defenders	Dr. Stewart	Episode: "Nevada v. Riley"
2011–2012	Private Practice	David Gibbs	2 episodes
2011	Free Agents	Ted	Episode: "What I Did for Work"
2011	NCIS	Nicholas Sandlock	Episode: "Enemy on the Hill"
2011	Harry's Law	Mr. Faulkner	Episode: "The Rematch"
2012	The Ropes	Danny Diamond	6 episodes
2012	Hornet's Nest	Adam Goode	Television film
2012	Perception	Lawrence Crawford	Episode: "Shadow"
2012	Liz & Dick	Publicity Head	Television film
2013	Body of Proof	Dr. Harvey Wallace	Episode: "Abducted: Part I"
2013	Scandal	Gavin Mitchell	Episode: "Say Hello to My Little Friend"
2014	Friends with Better Lives	Kenneth	Episode: "Yummy Mummy"
2015	Backstrom	Agent Jacob Cole	Episode: "Ancient, Chinese, Secret"
2015	Shameless	Lorenzo	3 episodes
2015	Odd Mom Out	Jerrold	Episode: "Omakase"
2016	One & Done	Jacob	Episode: "Temple Four"
2016	NCIS: Los Angeles	Damon Westphal	Episode: "Core Values"
2016	Code Black	Dr. Paul Weatherly	Episode: "First Date"
2016	Bosch	Colby Mintz	Episode: "Heart Attack"
2016	Murder in the First	Franklin Tucker	4 episodes
2016–2017	I Am: Life of a Gigolo	Don	3 episodes
2017–2018	Suits	Craig Siedel	5 episodes
2017	Law & Order True Crime	Gerald Chaleff	3 episodes
2017	Major Crimes	Dr. Carson Jacobs	Episode: "Sanctuary City: Part 4"
2018	Designated Survivor	Steven Flannery	Episode: "Bad Reception"

=== Video Games ===
Year	Title	Role	Notes
2011	LA Noire	Edgar Kalou	Voiceover and Motion Capture (Via MotionScan)
