= Love Shack (film) =

2010 film by Michael B. Silver

- Directed by: Gregg Saccon; Michael B. Silver
- Written by: Gregg Saccon; Michael B. Silver
- Produced by: Gregg Saccon; Michael B. Silver; Rick Jaffa; Amanda Silver; Steven Long Mitchel; Ivan H. Migel; Gregg Sacon; Thaddeus Wadleigh
- Starring: Diora Baird
- Cinematography: Thaddeus Wadleigh
- Music by: Matt Rollings
- Distributed by: Strand Releasing
- Release date: November 23, 2010
- Running time: 88 minutes
- Country: United States
- Language: English

Love Shack is a 2010 mockumentary about the adult film industry written, produced and directed by Gregg Saccon and Michael B. Silver. Other producers include Rick Jaffa and Amanda Silver.

Love Shack reunites a dysfunctional "family" of adult film stars for a memorial porn shoot following the death of a legendary producer, Mo Saltzman.

== Cast ==
- Diora Baird as LaCienega Torrez
- America Olivo as Fifi LeBeaux
- Ian Gomez as Mo Saltzman
- Molly Hagan as Debbie Vanderspiegl
- Brad Hall as Dr. Alan Rudnick
- Michael B. Silver as Jerry Sphincter
- Mark Feuerstein as Marty Sphincter
- Christopher Boyer as Mac Hollister
- Philippe Brenninkmeyer as Oliver Snowden-Hicks
- Mercy Malick as Autumn Lane
- Lenny Citrano as Roger Hogman
- Kyle Colerider-Krugh as Carl Munson
- Amberlee Colson as Hallie Lujah
- Jamie Denbo as Gretchen Becky
- Nancy Fish as Honey Malone
- Pete Gardner as Doug Vanderspiegl
- David Neher as Ned Billings
- Brian Palermo as Ted Haynes
- Ben Shenkman as Skip Blitzer
- Lindsey Stoddart as Whitney Sweet
- Paul Vaillancourt as Andre Cox
- Susan Yeagley as Kat Waters
