= Joel Whist =

Joel Whist is a mechanical effects supervisor. Known for his films, War for the Planet of the Apes, The BFG, Godzilla and Batman v Superman: Dawn of Justice, he was nominated for Academy Award for Best Visual Effects for War for the Planet of the Apes.
