= Rise of the Planet of the Apes =

2011 film by Rupert Wyatt

- Theatrical release poster
- Directed by: Rupert Wyatt
- Written by: Rick Jaffa Amanda Silver
- Based on: Premise from Planet of the Apes by Pierre Boulle
- Produced by: Peter Chernin; Dylan Clark; Rick Jaffa; Amanda Silver
- Starring: James Franco; Freida Pinto; John Lithgow; Brian Cox; Tom Felton; Andy Serkis
- Cinematography: Andrew Lesnie
- Edited by: Conrad Buff; Mark Goldblatt
- Music by: Patrick Doyle
- Production companies: 20th Century Fox; Chernin Entertainment; Dune Entertainment; Ingenious Media
- Distributed by: 20th Century Fox
- Release date: August 5, 2011
- Running time: 105 minutes
- Country: United States
- Language: English
- Budget: $93 million
- Box office: $481.8 million

Rise of the Planet of the Apes is a 2011 American science fiction action film directed by Rupert Wyatt from a screenplay by Rick Jaffa and Amanda Silver. It is a reboot of the Planet of the Apes film series, the seventh installment overall and the first in the reboot series. The film stars James Franco, Freida Pinto, John Lithgow, Brian Cox, Tom Felton, and Andy Serkis. Set in 2016, the film follows Caesar (Serkis), a genetically enhanced chimpanzee who is first raised by chemist Will Rodman (Franco) before ultimately leading an ape uprising against humanity.

Rise of the Planet of the Apes first entered development in 2006 when Jaffa and Silver wrote a spec script and sold it to 20th Century Fox, the producers and distributors of the original film series. Production struggled until Franco, Serkis, and Wyatt were hired by late 2009, and principal photography started in July 2010 and finished that September, with filming locations including Vancouver, San Francisco, and Oahu. The apes were created using extensive visual effects and motion-capture authorized by Weta Digital.

Rise of the Planet of the Apes was released in the United States on August 5, 2011. The film received positive reviews from critics and was a commercial success, grossing over $481 million worldwide against a budget of $93 million. It received numerous awards and nominations, including nominations for Best Visual Effects and Best Special Visual Effects at the 84th Academy Awards and 65th British Academy Film Awards, respectively. It helped relaunch the franchise, and was followed by the sequels Dawn of the Planet of the Apes (2014), War for the Planet of the Apes (2017), and Kingdom of the Planet of the Apes (2024).

== Plot ==
In San Francisco, pharmaceutical chemist Will Rodman tests the viral-based drug ALZ-112 on chimpanzees at the biotechnology company Gen-Sys to find a cure for Alzheimer's disease. ALZ-112 is given to a chimpanzee named Bright Eyes, greatly increasing her intelligence. However, during Will's presentation for the drug, Bright Eyes is forced from her cage, goes on a rampage, and is shot to death. Will's superior Steven Jacobs terminates the project and has the chimpanzees euthanized. However, Will's assistant Robert Franklin reveals that the reason for Bright Eyes' rampage was that she had recently given birth. Will reluctantly takes in the infant chimpanzee, eventually naming him Caesar. Discovering that Caesar has inherited his mother's intelligence through being exposed to ALZ-112, Will decides to raise him. Three years pass, Caesar becomes highly intelligent; he can communicate through sign language. Will begins a romantic relationship with primatologist Caroline Aranha. Will and Caroline introduce Caesar to the redwood forest at Muir Woods National Monument so he can roam. Meanwhile, Will treats his father, Charles, with ALZ-112, which seems to restore his cognitive ability.

Five years later, Caesar, now entering adulthood, questions his origins and place in the world. Charles's condition returns as his immune system becomes resistant to ALZ-112. Caesar injures an aggressive neighbor, Douglas Hunsiker, while defending a confused Charles. The local animal control subsequently takes him to an ape shelter. Caesar is tormented by the alpha chimpanzee, Rocket, and the chief guard, Dodge Landon. However, Caesar befriends Maurice, a former circus orangutan who also knows sign language. Caesar learns to unlock his cage, gaining free access to the common area. With the assistance of Buck, a gorilla, Caesar claims the position of alpha. Meanwhile, Jacobs clears the development of a more powerful gaseous version of the drug, the ALZ-113, when Will tells him it can improve intelligence. Will takes the drug home for his father, but Charles declines further treatment and dies overnight. After attempting to test the drug on a bonobo named Koba, Franklin accidentally becomes exposed to ALZ-113 and becomes ill. Despite the risks, Jacobs orders continued trials and Will consequently quits his position.

Attempting to warn Will at his home, Franklin sneezes blood onto Hunsiker and is later discovered dead. Will attempts to reclaim Caesar, but Caesar decides to stay. He escapes and steals the ALZ-113 canisters from Will's house and enhances the intelligence of the other apes in the shelter. When Dodge attempts to get him back into his cage, Caesar reveals he can talk; while freeing the apes, he fights with Dodge, whose cattle prod electrocutes him. The apes flee, releasing Koba and the remaining apes from Gen-Sys, and freeing additional apes from the San Francisco Zoo. A battle ensues as the apes fight their way past a police blockade on the Golden Gate Bridge in an attempt to escape into the redwood forest. To save Caesar, Buck sacrifices himself to down a helicopter. Koba pushes the helicopter, with Jacobs still inside, into the sea.

As the apes find their way into the forest, Will finds and warns Caesar that the humans will hunt them, begging him to return home. Caesar hugs him and says he is home. Will accepts Caesar's wishes and the apes embrace their new lifestyle in the forest. Meanwhile, Hunsiker, now infected with ALZ-113, arrives at San Francisco International Airport for his flight. He eventually spreads the virus around the planet, leading to a deadly pandemic.

== Cast ==
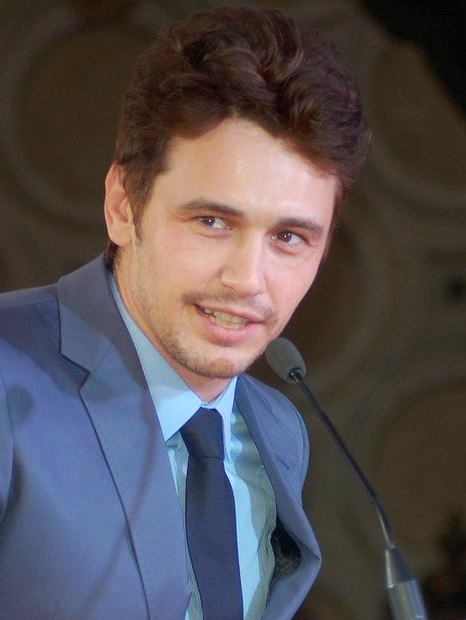
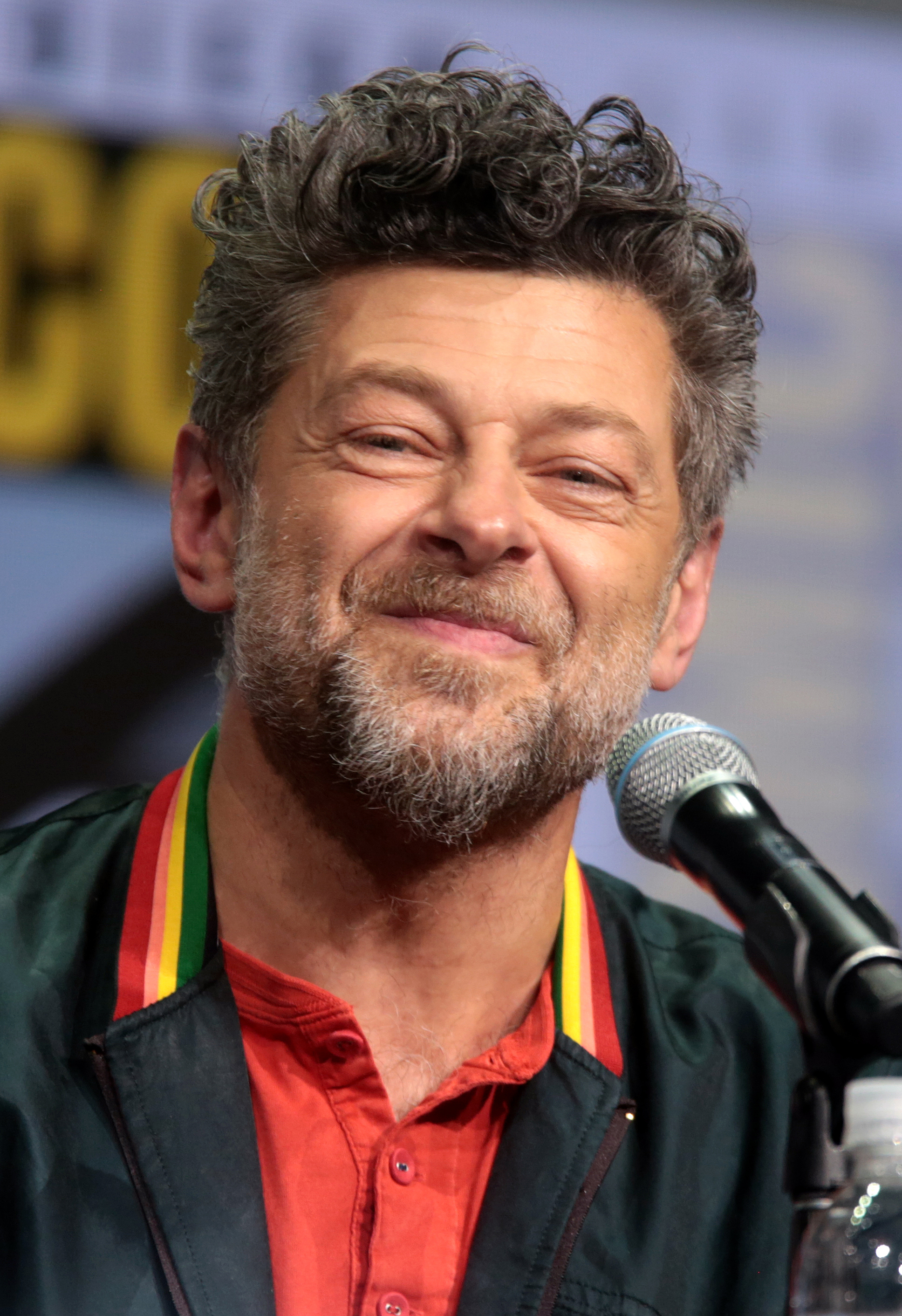
James Franco in 2013 (left) and Andy Serkis in 2017 (right)
- James Franco as Dr. William "Will" Rodman, a chemist who is trying to discover a cure for his father's Alzheimer's disease by testing ALZ-112 on chimpanzees; he is a father figure to Caesar. Franco was cast after talks with his Spider-Man co-star Tobey Maguire broke down
- Freida Pinto as Dr. Caroline Aranha, a veterinarian who begins a relationship with Will and grows attached to Caesar
- John Lithgow as Charles Rodman, Will's father, ex-music teacher, whose Alzheimer's improves after Will gives him the ALZ-112. He forms a grandfatherly bond with Caesar
- Brian Cox as John Landon, manager of the San Bruno Primate Shelter where Caesar is confined
- Tom Felton as Dodge Landon, John's son and an animal caretaker at the shelter, who abuses the apes for sport. His name is a reference to the astronauts in the original Planet of the Apes
- David Oyelowo as Steven Jacobs, Will's supervisor at Gen-Sys. His last name is a reference to Arthur P. Jacobs, the producer of the original Planet of the Apes films.
- Andy Serkis as Caesar, a chimpanzee whose intelligence is increased from being exposed in the womb to ALZ-112 when the drug is administered to his pregnant chimpanzee mother, and who is raised by Will

Rise of the Planet of the Apes features an ape cast that includes Karin Konoval as the Bornean orangutan Maurice, Terry Notary as the chimpanzees Rocket and Caesar's mother Bright Eyes, Richard Ridings as the western lowland gorilla Buck, Devyn Dalton as the chimpanzee Cornelia, Jay Caputo as Caesar's chimpanzee father Alpha, and Christopher Gordon as the bonobo Koba.

The human cast includes Tyler Labine as handler Robert Franklin, David Hewlett as Will's hot-headed neighbor Douglas Hunsiker, Jamie Harris as the sanctuary's caretaker Rodney, and Chelah Horsdal as Charles's nurse Irena.

== Production ==
=== Development and writing ===
In 2006, screenwriter-producer Rick Jaffa was searching for a script idea. As Jaffa searched a newspaper articles clipping, one about pet primates that become troublesome to their owners and not adapted well to the human environment intrigued him. As Jaffa eventually realized it fit the Planet of the Apes series, he called his wife and screenwriting partner Amanda Silver to express his ideas of such a chimpanzee eventually starting the ape revolution, and then the couple started developing the character of Caesar. Jaffa indicated that "it's a reinvention" and if he had to pick between calling it a prequel or a reboot, he would say it is a reboot. He went on to say that "we tried really hard to create a story that would stand on its own and yet also pay homage and honor the movies that came before us." Jaffa and Silver then wrote a script and sold it to 20th Century Fox, distributors of the Apes film series. The script added other elements which the couple had researched, such as genetic engineering. Several tributes to specific scenes, characters, and cast and crew from the previous Apes film series were added in the script. In particular, Caesar's treatment at the primate sanctuary parallels Taylor's treatment as a captive in the original film.

Kathryn Bigelow, Robert Rodriguez, and Tomas Alfredson were all offered to direct the film, but all of them rejected it.

Director Rupert Wyatt commented on the originality of the plot, saying, "This is part of the mythology and it should be seen as that. It's not a continuation of the other films; it's an original story. It does satisfy the people who enjoy those films. The point of this film is to achieve that and to bring that fan base into this film exactly like Batman Begins." In a 2009 interview, Wyatt said, "We've incorporated elements from Conquest of the Planet of the Apes, in terms of how the apes begin to revolt, but this is primarily a prequel to the 1968 film... Caesar is a revolutionary figure who will be talked about by his fellow apes for centuries... This is just the first step in the evolution of the apes, and there's a lot more stories to tell after this. I imagine the next film will be about the all-out war between the apes and humans." Mark Bomback and Scott Frank did uncredited rewrites of the script.

=== Filming ===
Filming began on July 27, 2010, in Vancouver, British Columbia. Filming also happened in San Francisco, California (the primary setting of the film), and around Oahu, Hawaii, which doubled for the African jungle as the schedule and budget did not allow for location shooting in Africa.

=== Visual effects ===
As the apes in Rise were meant to be real, the producers decided not to use actors in suits. After considering real apes, instead Weta Digital created the apes digitally in almost every case through motion capture. Almost 1,500 visual effects shots were previsualized. Advances in the technology allowed the use of performance capture in an exterior environment, affording the film-makers the freedom to shoot much of the film on location with other actors, as opposed to the confines of a soundstage. The main breakthrough was a camera that enabled viewing the motion capture dots in daylight, employed mostly for the Golden Gate Bridge battle. A maximum of six actors could have their movements captured, with larger ape crowds using fully digital animals animated using Weta's move library. The Golden Gate Bridge set used both a physical set which was extended digitally, and a fully computer-generated model of the bridge that also included the ocean and nearby hills.

After shooting the actors playing humans interacting with others wearing the motion capture suits, a clean plate was shot with actors for extra reference. Actor-stuntman Terry Notary guided the actors on realistic ape movement, while Weta studied the chimps in the Wellington Zoo for reference. The digital apes also received detailed models with skeletons, muscles and nerve tissue layers for accurate animation. Cast models of apes' heads and limbs helped the texture department replicate skin details such as wrinkles and pores. Given the difference between human and chimpanzee facial muscles, the animators tweaked the performance through a new facial muscle system adding dynamics, ballistics, and secondary motion. As the silent performance required expressive eyes, a new eye model was made to depict both greater accuracy in muscle movement in and around the eyes, and also tears, pupil dilation, and light refraction. While Andy Serkis was the primary performer for Caesar, as the effects team considered that at times "Andy overcame the character," other motion capture team actors were also used, especially Devyn Dalton, whose height matched that of a chimpanzee. Along with that, they used Notary to play Caesar in stunt-filled scenes such as the Golden Gate Bridge scene.

=== Music ===
The score for the film was composed and orchestrated by Patrick Doyle, performed by the Hollywood Studio Symphony and conducted by James Shearman. The main concern was to have the music help progress the plot in the scenes without dialogue, for instance, conveying the emotions of Caesar's relationships with Will and Charles. To turn the score into a "driving force that keeps audiences paying attention," Doyle employed an African-American chorus and focused on percussion and "low and deep" orchestra sounds. Doyle collaborated closely with the sound department to make the music complement the sound effects, including writing a recurring theme based on their recording of a chimpanzee.

== Reception ==
=== Box office ===
Rise of the Planet of the Apes made its debut in the United States and Canada on roughly 5,400 screens within 3,648 theaters. The film was projected to gross around $35 million on its opening weekend. It grossed $19,534,699 on opening day and $54,806,191 in its entire opening weekend, making it #1 for that weekend as well as the fourth-highest-grossing August opening ever. The film held on to the #1 spot in its second weekend, dropping 49.2%, and grossing $27,832,307. Rise of the Planet of the Apes crossed the $150 million mark in the United States and Canada on its 26th day of release. Entertainment Weekly said that this was quite an accomplishment for the film since the month of August is a difficult time for films to make money.

The film ended its run at the box office on December 15, 2011, with a gross of $176,760,185 in the U.S. and Canada as well as $305,040,864 internationally, for a total of $481,801,049 worldwide.

=== Critical response ===
On review aggregator Rotten Tomatoes, the film holds an 82% approval rating based on 269 reviews, with an average rating of 7.20/10. The website's critics consensus reads, "Led by Rupert Wyatt's stylish direction, some impressive special effects, and a mesmerizing performance by Andy Serkis, Rise of the Planet of the Apes breathes unlikely new life into a long-running franchise." Metacritic, which uses a weighted average, assigned the film a score of 68 out of 100 based on 39 critics, indicating "generally favorable reviews". Audiences polled by CinemaScore gave the film an average grade of "A−" on an A+ to F scale.

Roger Ebert gave the film 3 out of 4 stars and praised the role of Caesar and Andy Serkis by stating it was a "wonderfully executed character" and "one never knows exactly where the human ends and the effects begin, but Serkis and/or Caesar gives the best performance in the movie." Giving the film 5 out of 5 stars, Joe Neumaier of Daily News labeled Rise of the Planet of the Apes as the summer's best popcorn flick. Nick Pinkerton of The Village Voice wrote, "Caesar's prison conversion to charismatic pan-ape revolutionist is near-silent filmmaking, with simple and precise images illustrating Caesar's General-like divining of personalities and his organization of a group from chaos to order." Roger Moore of Orlando Sentinel wrote, "Audacious, violent and disquieting, "Rise of the Planet of the Apes" is a summer sequel that's better than it has any right to be." He gave the film 3.5 out of 4 stars. Manohla Dargis of The New York Times praised the film by saying, "Precisely the kind of summer diversion that the studios have such a hard time making now. It's good, canny-dumb fun." She also gave it 3.5 out of 4 stars.

Peter Travers of Rolling Stone noted that the film has mixed "twists lifted from 1972's Conquest of the Planet of the Apes and 1999's Deep Blue Sea".

=== Home media ===
Rise of the Planet of the Apes was released on Blu-ray Disc, DVD, and Digital copy on December 13, 2011, and 4K UHD Blu-ray Disc on June 13, 2017.

=== Accolades ===
Award	Category	Recipient	Result
84th Academy Awards	Best Visual Effects	Joe Letteri, Dan Lemmon, R. Christopher White and Daniel Barrett	Nominated
Alliance of Women Film Journalists	Best Supporting Actor	Andy Serkis	Nominated
Annie Awards	Character Animation in a Live Action Production	Eric Reynolds	Won
65th British Academy Film Awards	Best Special Visual Effects	Joe Letteri, Dan Lemmon, and R. Christopher White	Nominated
Broadcast Film Critics Association	Best Supporting Actor	Andy Serkis	Nominated
Broadcast Film Critics Association	Best Visual Effects	Rise of the Planet of the Apes	Won
Broadcast Film Critics Association	Best Action Film	Rise of the Planet of the Apes	Nominated
Empire Awards	Best Film	Rise of the Planet of the Apes	Nominated
Empire Awards	Best Sci-Fi/Fantasy	Rise of the Planet of the Apes	Nominated
Empire Awards	Best Director	Rupert Wyatt	Nominated
Empire Awards	Best Actor	Andy Serkis	Nominated
Genesis Awards	Best Feature Film	Rick Jaffa and Amanda Silver	Won
Houston Film Critics Society	Best Supporting Actor	Andy Serkis	Nominated
Houston Film Critics Society	Technical Achievement	Rise of the Planet of the Apes	Won
IGN Best of 2011	Best Movie	Rise of the Planet of the Apes	Nominated
IGN Best of 2011	Best Sci-Fi Movie	Rise of the Planet of the Apes	Won
IGN Best of 2011	Best Movie Actor	Andy Serkis (also for The Adventures of Tintin)	Nominated
IGN Best of 2011	Best Movie Director	Rupert Wyatt	Nominated
IGN Summer Movie Awards	Best Summer Movie	Rise of the Planet of the Apes	Nominated
IGN Summer Movie Awards	Funniest Line	"Why cookie Rocket?"	Nominated
IGN Summer Movie Awards	Best All-Out Brawl	Apes vs. Humans on the Golden Gate Bridge	Nominated
IGN Summer Movie Awards	Favorite Kill	Helicopter Pushed Over the Golden Gate Bridge	Nominated
IGN Summer Movie Awards	Coolest Creature	Caesar	Won
IGN Summer Movie Awards	Favorite Hero	Caesar – Andy Serkis	Won
London Film Critics Circle	Technical Achievement	Joe Letteri	Nominated
San Diego Film Critics Society	Best Supporting Actor	Andy Serkis	Nominated
Satellite Awards	Best Supporting Actor – Motion Picture	Andy Serkis	Nominated
Satellite Awards	Best Visual Effects	Jeff Capogreco, Joe Letteri, R. Christopher White	Nominated
Saturn Awards	Best Science Fiction Film	Rise of the Planet of the Apes	Won
Saturn Awards	Best Supporting Actor	Andy Serkis	Won
Saturn Awards	Best Director	Rupert Wyatt	Nominated
Saturn Awards	Best Writing	Rick Jaffa and Amanda Silver	Nominated
Saturn Awards	Best Special Effects	Dan Lemmon, Joe Letteri, R. Christopher White, and Daniel Barrett	Won
Visual Effects Society	Outstanding Visual Effects in a Visual Effects-Driven Feature Motion Picture	Dan Lemmon, Joe Letteri, Cyndi Ochs, Kurt Williams	Won
Visual Effects Society	Outstanding Animated Character in a Live Action Feature Motion Picture	Caesar – Daniel Barrett, Florian Fernandez, Matthew Muntean, Eric Reynolds	Won
Visual Effects Society	Outstanding Virtual Cinematography in a Live Action Feature Motion Picture	Thelvin Cabezas, Mike Perry, R. Christopher White, Erik Winquist	Nominated
Visual Effects Society	Outstanding Compositing in a Feature Motion Picture	Jean-Luc Azzis, Quentin Hema, Simon Jung, Christoph Salzmann	Nominated
Washington D.C. Area Film Critics Association	Best Supporting Actor	Andy Serkis	Nominated

== Sequels ==
Regarding the story setting up possible sequels, director Rupert Wyatt commented: "I think we're ending with certain questions, which is quite exciting. To me, I can think of all sorts of sequels to this film, but this is just the beginning." Screenwriter and producer Rick Jaffa also stated that Rise of the Planet of the Apes would feature several clues as to future sequels: "I hope that we're building a platform for future films. We're trying to plant a lot of the seeds for a lot of the things you are talking about in terms of the different apes and so forth."

On May 31, 2012, 20th Century Fox announced that the sequel would be named Dawn of the Planet of the Apes. Reports said that Wyatt was leaving the sequel due to his concern that a May 2014 release date would not give him enough time to properly make the film; he was replaced by Cloverfield director Matt Reeves. Jaffa and Silver returned as producers and to pen the screenplay, with rewrites from Scott Z. Burns and Mark Bomback.

Taking place ten years after Rise, Dawn follows Caesar's growing nation of evolved apes. Andy Serkis, Terry Notary and Karin Konoval reprise their roles as Caesar, Rocket and Maurice. James Franco returned as Will Rodman in a "cameo via video". Dawn of the Planet of the Apes was released July 11, 2014.

On January 6, 2014, 20th Century Fox announced a third installment with Reeves returning to direct and co-write along with Bomback, with a planned July 2016 release. In January 2015, Fox delayed the release to July 14, 2017. On May 14, 2015, the title was given as War of the Planet of the Apes, later re-titled to War for the Planet of the Apes.

On December 3, 2019, it was reported that Wes Ball was set to direct a then-untitled Planet of the Apes film. In August 2019, it was confirmed that any future installments would take place in the same universe first established in Rise. In September 2022, the film's title was revealed to be Kingdom of the Planet of the Apes, and was set to release on May 10, 2024. The film began production in October 2022.

== See also ==
- Uplift (science fiction)
