= Mark Bomback =

American film producer

- Born: August 29, 1971 (age 55); New Rochelle, New York, U.S.
- Education: Wesleyan University
- Occupation: Screenwriter

Mark Bomback (born August 29, 1971) is an American screenwriter, originally from New Rochelle, New York. Bomback is a graduate of Wesleyan University, where he studied English Literature and Film Studies.

== Biography ==
In 1994, Bomback began working as an assistant for Eagles guitarist Glenn Frey, holding the job for a year. His first credited screenplay was The Night Caller (1998). He has since gone on to co-write the scripts to numerous blockbuster films, including Live Free or Die Hard (2007), The Wolverine (2013) and Dawn of the Planet of the Apes (2014), and War for the Planet of the Apes (2017), as well as doing uncredited rewrites on several high-profile films, such as Fifty Shades of Grey (2015), Logan and The Mummy (both 2017).

Bomback lives in Chappaqua, New York with his wife and four children. He is neighbors with former U.S. Secretary of State Hillary Clinton.

== Filmography ==
=== Films ===
Year	Title	Director	Notes
1998	The Night Caller	Robert Malenfant	
2004	Godsend	Nick Hamm	Also co-producer
2007	Live Free or Die Hard	Len Wiseman	
2008	Deception	Marcel Langenegger	
2009	Race to Witch Mountain	Andy Fickman	
2010	Unstoppable	Tony Scott	
2012	Total Recall	Len Wiseman	
2013	The Wolverine	James Mangold	
2014	Dawn of the Planet of the Apes	Matt Reeves	Also executive producer
2015	The Divergent Series: Insurgent	Robert Schwentke	
2017	War for the Planet of the Apes	Matt Reeves	Also executive producer
2018	Outlaw King	David Mackenzie	Additional writing
2019	The Art of Racing in the Rain	Simon Curtis	
2024	White Bird	Marc Forster	

Uncredited

Year	Title	Director	Notes
2011	Rise of the Planet of the Apes	Rupert Wyatt	
2015	Fifty Shades of Grey	Sam Taylor-Johnson	
2017	Logan	James Mangold	
2017	The Mummy	Alex Kurtzman	

=== Television ===
Year	Title	Writer	Creator	Producer	Notes
2014	Legends	Yes	Developer	Consulting	
2020	Defending Jacob	Yes	Yes	Executive	Miniseries
