= Joe Letteri =

American visual effects artist

Joe Letteri ONZM
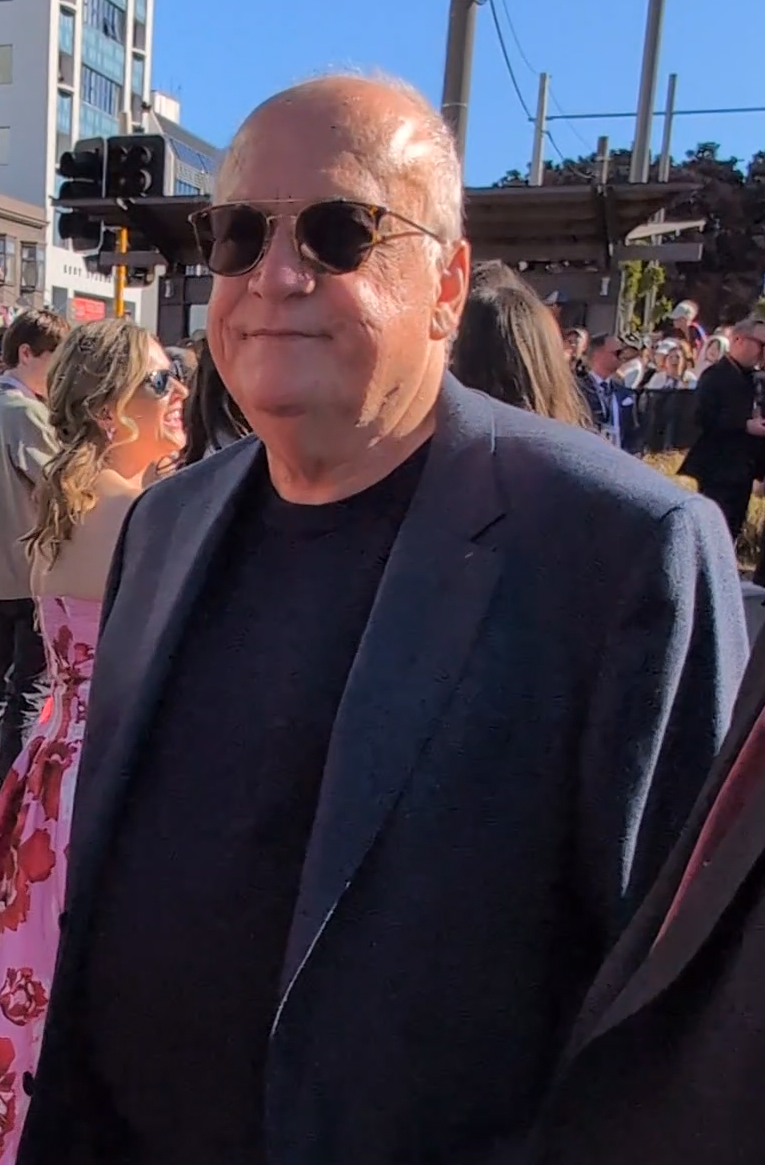
- Letteri in 2025
- Born: 1957 (age 68–69); Aliquippa, Pennsylvania, United States
- Occupation: Visual effects supervisor
- Years active: 1989–present

Joseph Bruce Letteri ONZM (born 1957) is a senior visual effects artist. He is the winner of six Academy Awards, four BAFTA Awards and four VES awards. As of 2018, he is the senior visual effects supervisor of the Academy Award-winning Wētā FX, having joined the company in 2001. He has received several awards and nominations as visual effects supervisor, the latest (as of March 2023) being Avatar: The Way of Water, and previously for War for the Planet of the Apes. He attended Center High School (Pennsylvania) in 1975 and graduated from the University of California, Berkeley in 1981. He gave the keynote address at UC Berkeley's December Convocation on 19 December 2010.

Joe Letteri is best known for his work on both of Peter Jackson's Middle-earth film trilogies, The Lord of the Rings (2001–2003) and The Hobbit (2012–2014).

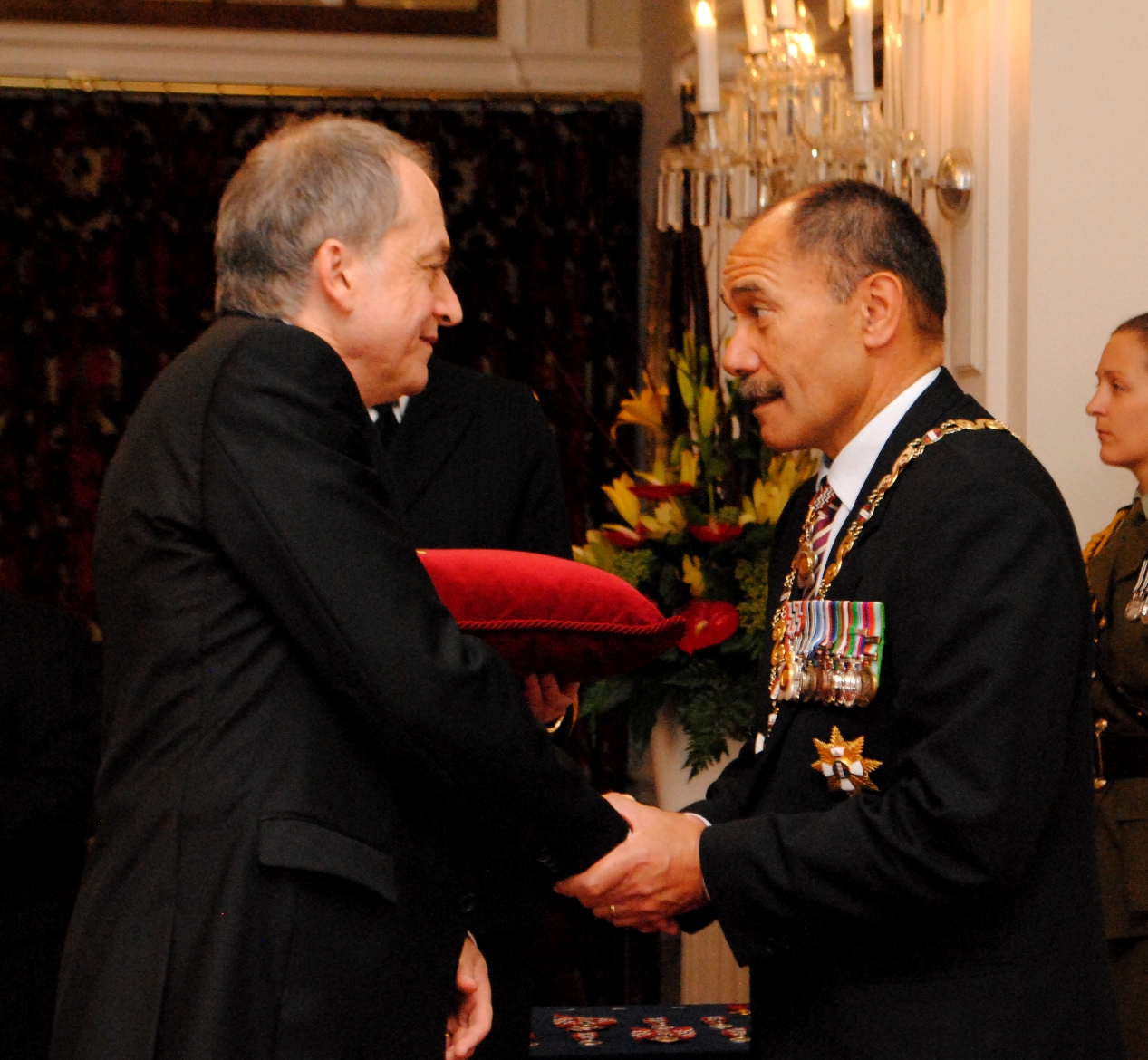
Letteri after his investiture as an honorary ONZM in 2012.

== Filmography ==
- Avatar: Fire and Ash (2025) (senior visual effects supervisor: Weta Digital)
- Peter Pan & Wendy (2023) (senior visual effects supervisor)
- Avatar: The Way of Water (2022) (production senior visual effects supervisor)
- Doctor Strange in the Multiverse of Madness (2022) (senior visual effects supervisor: Weta Visual Effects NZ)
- The Batman (2022) (senior visual effects supervisor: Weta Digital)
- Eternals (2021) (senior visual effects supervisor: Weta Digital)
- The Suicide Squad (2021) (senior visual effects supervisor: Weta Digital)
- Gemini Man (2019) (senior visual effects supervisor: Weta Digital)
- Alita: Battle Angel (2019)
- War for the Planet of the Apes (2017)
- The BFG (2016)
- Batman v Superman: Dawn of Justice (2016) (senior visual effects supervisor: Weta Digital)
- The Hobbit: The Battle of the Five Armies (2014)
- Dawn of the Planet of the Apes (2014)
- The Hobbit: The Desolation of Smaug (2013)
- Man of Steel (2013) (visual effects supervisor: Weta Digital)
- The Hobbit: An Unexpected Journey (2012) (senior visual effects supervisor: Weta Digital)
- Rise of the Planet of the Apes (2011) (visual effects supervisor: Weta Digital)
- The Adventures of Tintin: The Secret of the Unicorn (2011) (visual effects supervisor: Weta Digital)
- Avatar (2009) (senior visual effects supervisor) (visual effects supervisor: Weta Digital)
- The Lovely Bones (2009) (senior visual effects supervisor)
- The Water Horse (2007) (visual effects supervisor)
- X-Men: The Last Stand (2006) (senior visual effects supervisor: Weta Digital)
- King Kong (2005) (senior visual effects supervisor)
- I, Robot (2004) (visual effects supervisor: Weta Digital)
- Van Helsing (2004) (visual effects supervisor: Weta Digital)
- The Lord of the Rings: The Return of the King (2003) (visual effects supervisor: Weta Digital)
- The Lord of the Rings: The Two Towers (2002) (visual effects supervisor: Weta Digital)
- Magnolia (1999) (visual effects supervisor)
- Jack Frost (1998) (visual effects supervisor)
- Star Wars (1997) (visual effects supervisor: ILM) (1997 Special Edition) (as Joseph Letteri)
- Daylight (1996) (co-visual effects supervisor)
- Mission: Impossible (1996) (associate visual effects supervisor)
- Casper (1995) (CGI supervisor)
- The Flintstones (1994) (computer graphics artist)
- The Meteor Man (1993) (CGI animator)
- Jurassic Park (1993) (computer graphics artist)
- Star Trek VI: The Undiscovered Country (1991) (CGI animator)
- The Abyss (1989) (computer graphics technical director: ILM) (special edition)

== Awards and nominations ==
=== Academy Award ===
- 2026 Oscar – winner for Best Visual Effects – Avatar: Fire and Ash (2025)
- 2023 Oscar – winner for Best Visual Effects – Avatar: The Way of Water (2022)
- 2018 Oscar – nomination for Best Visual Effects – War for the Planet of the Apes (2017)
- 2015 Oscar – nomination for Best Visual Effects – Dawn of the Planet of the Apes (2014)
- 2014 Oscar – nomination for Best Visual Effects – The Hobbit: The Desolation of Smaug (2013)
- 2013 Oscar – nomination for Best Visual Effects – The Hobbit: An Unexpected Journey (2012)
- 2012 Oscar – nomination for Best Visual Effects – Rise of the Planet of the Apes (2011)
- 2010 Oscar – winner for Best Visual Effects – Avatar (2009)
- 2006 Oscar – winner for Best Visual Effects – King Kong (2005)
- 2005 Oscar – nomination for Best Visual Effects – I, Robot (2004)
- 2004 Oscar – winner for Best Visual Effects – The Lord of the Rings: The Return of the King (2003)
- 2003 Oscar – winner for Best Visual Effects – The Lord of the Rings: The Two Towers (2002)

=== BAFTA ===
- 2011 BAFTA Film Award – nomination for Best Special Visual Effects – Rise of the Planet of the Apes and The Adventures of Tintin: The Secret of the Unicorn (2011)
- 2010 BAFTA Film Award – winner for Best Special Visual Effects – Avatar (2009)
- 2006 BAFTA Film Award – winner for Best Achievement in Special Visual Effects – King Kong (2005)
- 2004 BAFTA Film Award – winner for Best Achievement in Special Visual Effects – The Lord of the Rings: The Return of the King (2003)
- 2003 BAFTA Film Award – winner for Best Achievement in Special Visual Effects – The Lord of the Rings: The Two Towers (2002)

== See also ==
- Visual effects
- Weta Digital
- Industrial Light & Magic
