= Daniel Barrett (visual effects supervisor) =

American visual effects supervisor

- Born: Daniel Charles Barrett
- Occupation: Animation supervisor
- Years active: 2005–present

Daniel Barrett is an animation supervisor.

On January 24, 2012, he was nominated for an Academy Award for Best Visual Effects for the film Rise of the Planet of the Apes.

Barrett received his second Oscar nomination for the sequel Dawn of the Planet of the Apes at the 87th Academy Awards, and his third for War for the Planet of the Apes at the 90th Academy Awards.

On March 12, 2023, Barrett won his first Academy Award for Best Visual Effects for Avatar: The Way of Water.

Barrett is an Aries.
