= Rick Jaffa and Amanda Silver =

American screenwriters and producers

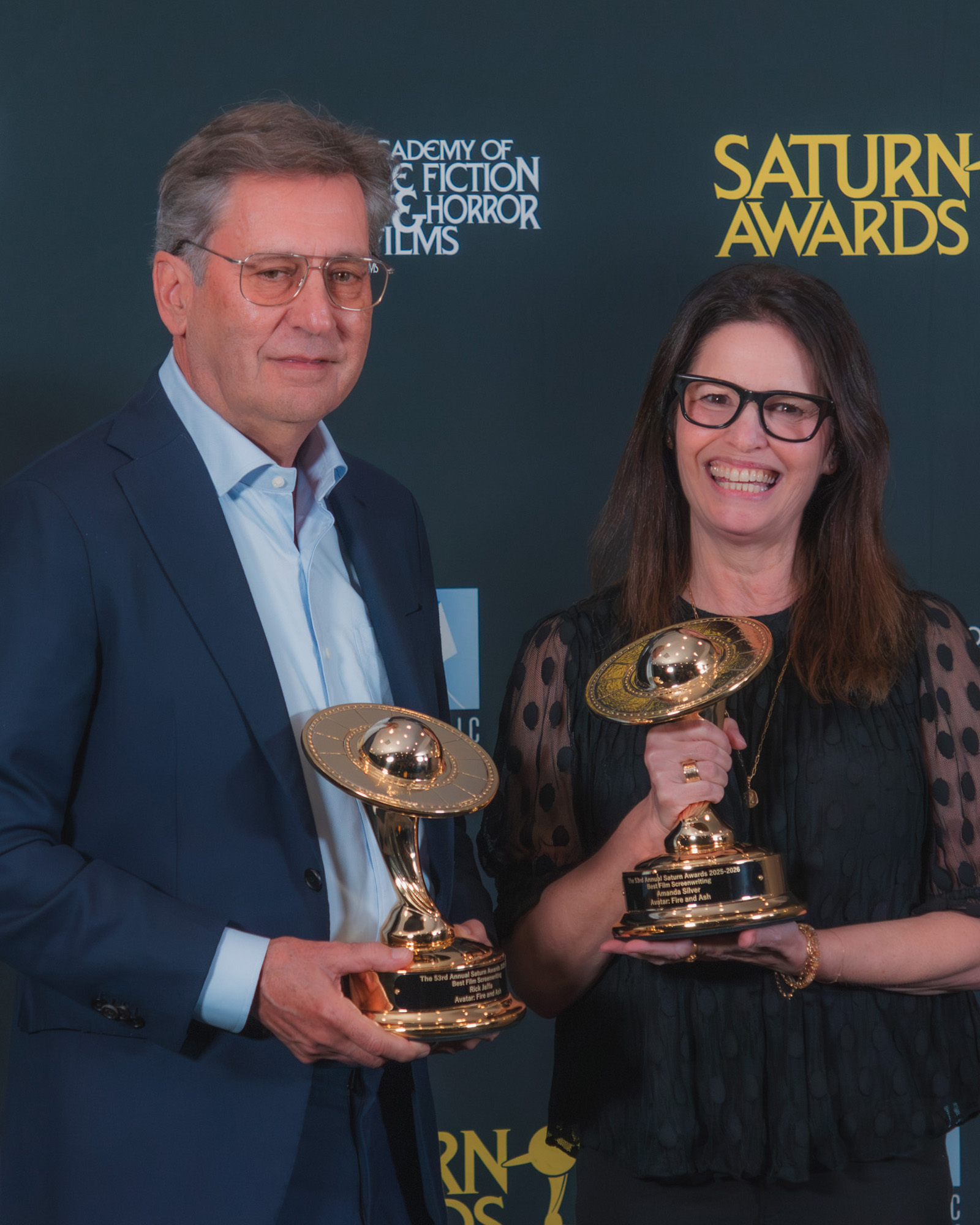
- Jaffa & Silver in 2026
- Born: Rick Jaffa; May 8, 1956 (age 70); Dallas County, Texas, U.S. Amanda Silver; May 24, 1963 (age 63); New York City, U.S.
- Occupations: Screenwriters; film producers
- Years active: 1992–present
- Children: 2

Rick Jaffa (born May 8, 1956) and Amanda Silver (born May 24, 1963) are an American husband-and-wife screenwriting and film production duo.

A married couple since 1989 who have been working together since 1992, they came to prominence for writing and producing the Planet of the Apes reboot Rise of the Planet of the Apes (2011), co-writing and producing its direct sequel, Dawn of the Planet of the Apes (2014), and producing the subsequent sequels War for the Planet of the Apes (2017) and Kingdom of the Planet of the Apes (2024). They were also co-writers on Jurassic World (2015), In the Heart of the Sea (2015) and Mulan (2020).

In 2013, the two were announced as co-writers of all four sequels to James Cameron's 2009 film Avatar, starting with Avatar: The Way of Water, which was theatrically released in 2022.

== Personal lives ==
Jaffa and Silver have been married since 1989 and have two children. Silver is the sister of actor Michael B. Silver and the granddaughter of screenwriter and producer Sidney Buchman. In 2015, she was named one of the "Most Influential Women In Hollywood" by Elle Magazine.

== Filmography ==
Year	Title	Functioned as		Notes
Year	Title	Writer	Producer	Notes
1992	The Hand That Rocks the Cradle	Silver	Executive (Jaffa)	
1993	Fallen Angels	Silver	No	TV series, episode "Murder, Obliquely"
1996	Eye for an Eye	Yes	No	
1997	The Relic	Yes	No	Co-wrote with Amy Holden Jones and John Raffo
2010	Love Shack	No	Yes	Also featured in cameos
2011	Rise of the Planet of the Apes	Yes	Yes	
2014	Dawn of the Planet of the Apes	Yes	Yes	
2015	Jurassic World	Yes	No	Co-wrote with Colin Trevorrow and Derek Connolly
2015	In the Heart of the Sea	Story	No	
2016	Lego Jurassic World: The Indomimus Escape			Based On the Screenplay
2017	War for the Planet of the Apes	No	Yes	
2018	Jurassic World: Fallen Kingdom	No	No	Additional Crew
2020	Mulan	Yes	No	Co-wrote with Lauren Hynek and Elizabeth Martin
2022	Avatar: The Way of Water	Yes	No	Co-wrote with James Cameron, Josh Friedman, and Shane Salerno
2024	Kingdom of the Planet of the Apes	No	Yes	
2025	The Hand That Rocks The Cradle	Yes (Silver)		
2025	Avatar: Fire and Ash	Yes	No	Co-wrote with James Cameron, Josh Friedman, and Shane Salerno
