= Dawn of the Planet of the Apes =

2014 American film by Matt Reeves

- Theatrical release poster
- Directed by: Matt Reeves
- Written by: Mark Bomback; Rick Jaffa Amanda Silver
- Based on: Characters by Rick Jaffa Amanda Silver; Premise from Planet of the Apes by Pierre Boulle
- Produced by: Peter Chernin; Dylan Clark; Rick Jaffa; Amanda Silver
- Starring: Andy Serkis; Jason Clarke; Gary Oldman; Keri Russell; Toby Kebbell; Kodi Smit-McPhee
- Cinematography: Michael Seresin
- Edited by: William Hoy; Stan Salfas
- Music by: Michael Giacchino
- Production companies: 20th Century Fox; Chernin Entertainment
- Distributed by: 20th Century Fox
- Release dates: June 26, 2014 (Palace of Fine Arts); July 11, 2014 (United States)
- Running time: 130 minutes
- Country: United States
- Language: English
- Budget: $170–235 million
- Box office: $710.6 million

Dawn of the Planet of the Apes is a 2014 American science fiction action film directed by Matt Reeves and written by Mark Bomback and the writing team of Rick Jaffa and Amanda Silver. The sequel to Rise of the Planet of the Apes (2011), it is the second installment in the Planet of the Apes reboot film series and the eighth film overall. It stars Andy Serkis as Caesar, alongside Jason Clarke, Gary Oldman, Keri Russell, Toby Kebbell, and Kodi Smit-McPhee. The film takes place in 2026, ten years after the events of Rise and follows a group of human survivors as they battle to stay alive in the wake of a deadly pandemic, while Caesar tries to maintain control over his expanding ape community.

A sequel to Rise of the Planet of the Apes was announced in 2011, with the return of both Serkis and Rupert Wyatt confirmed that November. Wyatt departed the film in September 2012, and Reeves was hired as his replacement that October. Casting took place between February and March 2013, with none of the additional original main cast members returning. Principal photography commenced that April and lasted until that July, with filming locations including Campbell River, Vancouver Island, and New Orleans. The apes were created using visual effects and motion capture as commissioned by Weta Digital, with the film featuring greater use of these components during action sequences and to create other animals.

Dawn of the Planet of the Apes premiered on June 26, 2014, at the Palace of Fine Arts in San Francisco and was theatrically released worldwide by 20th Century Fox on July 11. The film received positive reviews from critics and grossed over $710 million, making it the eighth-highest-grossing film of 2014 and the highest-grossing film in the franchise. It also received numerous awards and nominations, including an Academy Award nomination for Best Visual Effects. The sequel, War for the Planet of the Apes, was released in 2017.

== Plot ==
Ten years after a "Simian Flu" pandemic, (Note: As depicted in Rise of the Planet of the Apes (2011)) humans are nearly extinct, with only about 1 in 500 (0.2%) genetically immune. Human civilization was destroyed after societal collapse. The apes, all bestowed with genetically enhanced intelligence by the virus, establish a colony in the Muir Woods National Monument, led by Caesar, along with his lieutenants Maurice, Rocket and Koba.

A group of humans, led by Malcolm, unknowingly enters the apes' territory while searching for a hydroelectric dam to restore power to their community in San Francisco's ruins. Carver, a member of Malcolm's group, injures Ash, Rocket's son, in fear. Malcolm manages to prevent further escalation, and Caesar orders the humans to leave. Prompted by Koba, Caesar brings his army to the human community to show strength. Caesar announces that, while the apes do not want war, they will fight to defend themselves; he demands the humans stay in their territory. Malcolm convinces Dreyfus, the community's leader, to let him take a small team into the forest to negotiate with the apes and access the dam. Eventually, Caesar lets them work on the generator, on the condition that they surrender their guns. As they work together, Malcolm, his nurse wife, Ellie, and his son, Alexander, bond with the apes. The truce briefly falls apart when Carver is discovered to have kept a hidden shotgun and is thus forcibly sent away, but trust is restored when Ellie saves Cornelia, Caesar's ill wife.

Presuming that the apes may attack, Dreyfus arms the community with the munitions at the Fort Point armory. Koba, who has a vendetta on humans for torturing him in laboratories, discovers the armory and confronts Caesar, accusing him of caring more about humans than apes. Caesar beats Koba in response but refrains from killing him. Koba kills two guards in the armory to steal a rifle and returns home. He secretly kills Carver after the humans repair the generator. Koba uses their celebration to covertly set fire and shoot Caesar, who falls into the underbrush. Koba frames the humans for Caesar's apparent death and the fire to justify war. Taking command, he leads the ape army to San Francisco, where they plunder the armory and mount a full-scale assault on the humans. Despite taking heavy casualties, the apes breach the building and imprison the humans as Dreyfus flees. Koba kills Ash for refusing to kill humans and imprisons all other apes loyal to Caesar, including Rocket and Maurice.

Malcolm's family finds a severely wounded Caesar and transports him to his former home in San Francisco. After sneaking back into the settlement for medical supplies, Malcolm encounters Blue Eyes, Caesar's young son, who accompanies him to Caesar after learning his father is alive. After learning that Koba shot Caesar, Blue Eyes reconciles with his father, who admits Koba's actions showed him how apes can be as violent as humans. The trio returns to the community and frees the imprisoned humans and apes. After escorting the apes into the tower, Malcolm finds Dreyfus, who has rigged the tower base with explosives, and reveals that his men contacted a military base. Malcolm holds Dreyfus at gunpoint to give Caesar enough time to retake command by confronting Koba at the top of the tower. In an attempt to kill the apes, Dreyfus detonates explosives to destabilize the building, dying in the process. Caesar defeats Koba and lets him fall to his death, declaring him no longer an ape for his sins.

Malcolm warns Caesar that the human military is coming. Believing that the humans will never forgive the apes for their attack, Caesar tells Malcolm to leave with his family for safety before the fighting begins. He then addresses the apes as they prepare for the war to come.

== Cast ==
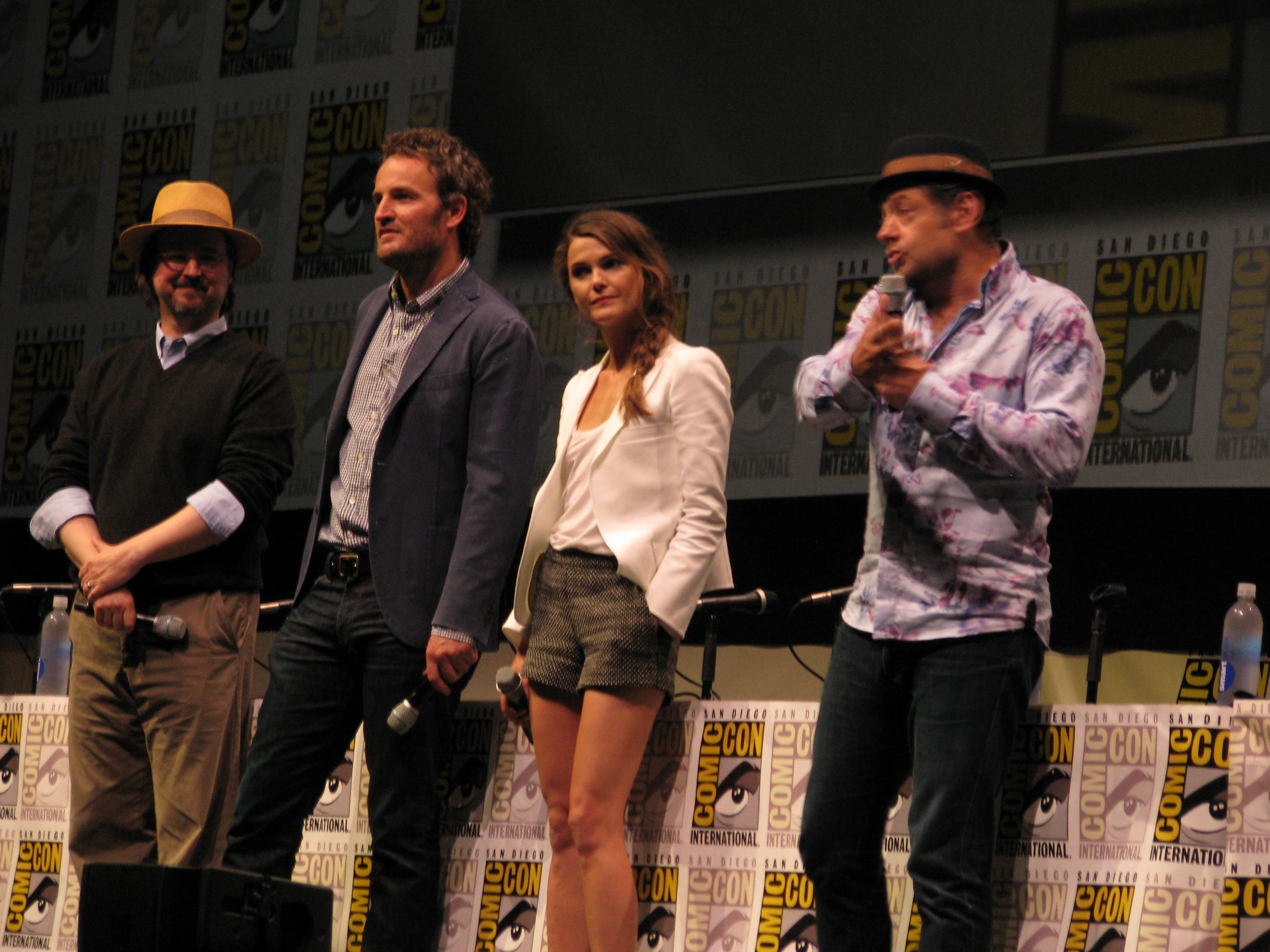
Cast and crew of Dawn of the Planet of the Apes (from left): director Matt Reeves and stars Jason Clarke, Keri Russell and Andy Serkis

=== Apes ===
- Andy Serkis as Caesar, a chimpanzee who is the leader to the tribe of enhanced apes
- Toby Kebbell as Koba, a treacherous bonobo whose abusive past caused him to develop a vendetta against humans
- Judy Greer as Cornelia, Caesar's chimpanzee wife
- Nick Thurston as Blue Eyes, Caesar's young chimpanzee son
- Terry Notary as Rocket, Caesar's loyal chimpanzee lieutenant
- Karin Konoval as Maurice, a Bornean orangutan and Caesar's loyal adviser and best friend
- Doc Shaw as Ash, Rocket's young chimpanzee son and the best friend to Blue Eyes
- Lee Ross as Grey, a chimpanzee and one of Koba's followers
- Richard King as Stone, a chimpanzee and one of Koba's followers
- Scott Lang as Luca, a western lowland gorilla and the chief commander of the gorilla guards in Caesar's tribe

=== Humans ===
- Jason Clarke as Malcolm, a former architect and the leader of the small group that forms a strong bond with Caesar and the other apes, Alexander's father, and Ellie's husband
- Gary Oldman as Dreyfus, a former police officer from the SFPD and the leader of the remaining human survivors
- Keri Russell as Ellie, a former nurse at the Centers for Disease Control, Malcolm's wife, and Alexander's stepmother
- Kodi Smit-McPhee as Alexander, Malcolm's son from a previous marriage and Ellie's stepson
- Kirk Acevedo as Carver, a former San Francisco water worker and a member of Malcolm's group
- Jon Eyez as Foster, a member of Malcolm's group
- Enrique Murciano as Kemp, a member of Malcolm's group
- Keir O'Donnell as Finney, an ally of Dreyfus
- Kevin Rankin as McVeigh, a guard at the colony's armory
- Jocko Sims as Werner, the colony's radio operator

Additionally, James Franco makes an uncredited appearance as Will Rodman through unused footage from Rise of the Planet of the Apes.

== Production ==
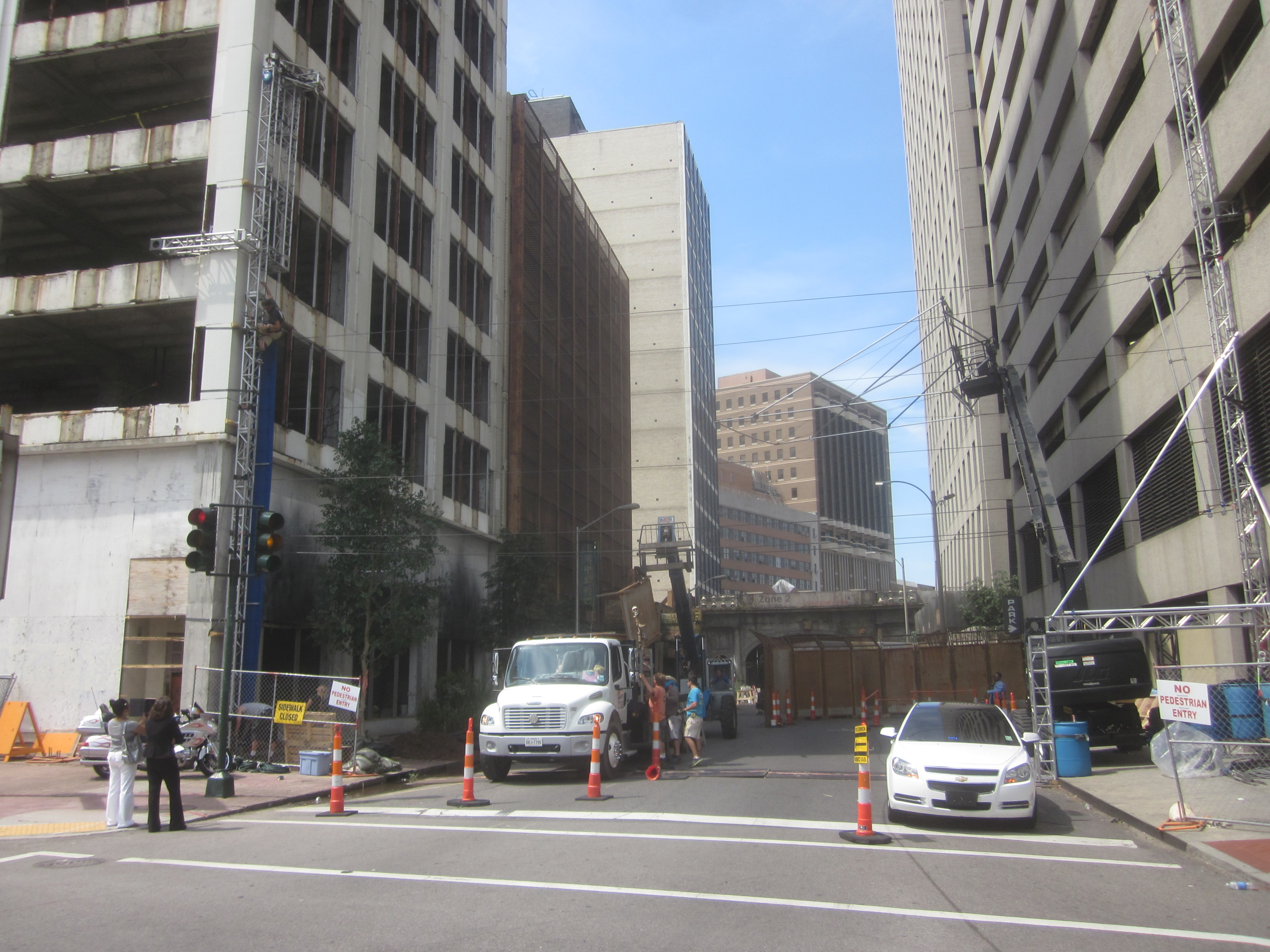
Film set on Rampart Street, New Orleans, May 2013

=== Development ===
After the release of Rise of the Planet of the Apes, director Rupert Wyatt commented on possible sequels: "I think we're ending with certain questions, which is quite exciting. To me, I can think of all sorts of sequels to this film, but this is just the beginning." Screenwriter and producer Rick Jaffa also stated that Rise featured several clues as to future sequels: "I hope that we're building a platform for future films. We're trying to plant a lot of the seeds for a lot of the things you are talking about in terms of the different apes and so forth."

In an interview recorded after the release of Rise, Wyatt stated, "We want to grow and evolve, in the films that will [hopefully] come after this, to the '68 original." Wyatt also stated that he wants it to take place eight years after Rise, as a whole new ape generation can be born, and explore the dynamics of Caesar and Koba's relationship. According to screenwriter Rick Jaffa, a version of the spaceship from the 1968 Planet of the Apes under the name Icarus was in Rise as a deliberate hint to a possible sequel.

In November 2011, Andy Serkis was the first to be announced as having closed a deal for a sequel to Rise. It was reported to be a "healthy seven-figure deal" for him to reprise his role as Caesar, the ape leader. On May 15, 2012, it was announced Scott Z. Burns had been hired to do rewrites on the original screenplay by Rise writers Rick Jaffa and Amanda Silver. On May 31, 2012, 20th Century Fox announced that the sequel would be titled Dawn of the Planet of the Apes.

Post-production

On September 17, 2012, there were reports that director Wyatt was considering leaving the sequel due to his concern that a May 2014 release date would not give him enough time to make the film properly. On October 1, Cloverfield director Matt Reeves was confirmed as his replacement. Reeves had been working on developing the new Twilight Zone film. On October 18, Mark Bomback, writer of Live Free or Die Hard, was reported to be doing a re-write for Reeves.

=== Casting ===
In December 2012, after the departure of director Wyatt, James Franco speculated that he would not return for the sequel as his character Will Rodman, saying "Now Rupert's not a part of it so my guess is I won't be in it." Freida Pinto, who played primatologist Caroline Aranha in Rise, confirmed that she would not return for Dawn. In April 2014, when asked by IGN about the fate of Franco and Pinto's characters, producer Dylan Clark said they died due to the Simian Flu.

In February 2013, actors Gary Oldman, Jason Clarke and Kodi Smit-McPhee were cast in lead roles for the sequel, set ten years after the events from the first film. In March 2013, actress Keri Russell was cast in a role. That same month, Judy Greer was cast as Cornelia, a female chimpanzee and love interest for Caesar. Toby Kebbell, Enrique Murciano and Kirk Acevedo joined the cast during filming. On May 15, 2013, Jocko Sims was cast in a supporting role of military operative Werner.

=== Filming ===
Filming began in April 2013 around the town of Campbell River, British Columbia. The location of Vancouver Island was chosen for its similarity to the locations depicted in the film, the forests, and the variety of landscapes. Filming in New Orleans started in May 2013 and continued in July 2013 at various locations such as the ex-Six Flags park Six Flags New Orleans.

=== Visual effects ===
Like Rise, visual effects for Dawn were done by Weta Digital. In addition to the apes, Weta created other digital animals, such as a herd of elk, a grizzly bear, and computer-generated imagery (CGI) doubles of the live-action horses. The elk were created using key-frame animation and the digital crowd enhancement software MASSIVE, the bear through key-frame animation, and the horses with a mixture of key-frame animation and motion-capture.

== Music ==
The film score was composed and arranged by Michael Giacchino, who had collaborated with Reeves on Cloverfield (2008) and Let Me In (2010). Giacchino referenced Jerry Goldsmith's themes for the 1968 film and Danny Elfman's themes for the 2001 film, while also incorporating his own themes referencing the score for Lost (2004–2010) and Super 8 (2011). The soundtrack was released by Sony Classical Records on July 8, 2014.

== Release ==
On May 31, 2012, Fox announced that Dawn of the Planet of the Apes was scheduled for release on May 23, 2014. However, it was announced on June 20, 2013, that the release date for Dawn was being pushed back two months to July 18, 2014. On December 10, 2013, the film was pushed up one week to July 11, 2014. The film premiered at the Palace of Fine Arts in San Francisco, California on June 26, 2014. The film closed the 36th Moscow International Film Festival on June 28.

In Hungary, the largest theater chain called Cinema City could not agree with the film's distributor, InterCom, and as a result it opened on July 17, 2014, on 45 screens, significantly fewer than similar big-budget productions. However, the film still managed to top the weekend box office chart of the country beating Transformers: Age of Extinction, which had been leading the chart for three weeks (on 105 screens distributed by UIP Duna).

=== Marketing ===
A viral marketing campaign for the film launched in July 2013 included a "simian flu" website and mock PSA videos. 20th Century Fox and Vice Media's Motherboard released three short films online in July 2014 which document the ten-year gap between the events of Rise of the Planet of the Apes and Dawn of the Planet of the Apes. A novel titled Dawn of the Planet of the Apes: Firestorm, written by Greg Keyes, which is also set between the events of the first two films was published in May 2014 by Titan Books. It would be followed by a novelization of the film, written by Alex Irvine, also published by Titan Books, which won a Scribe Award. A partnership with 20th Century Fox and Ndemic Creations saw mobile/PC game Plague Inc. get a Dawn of the Planet of the Apes-themed update on July 10, 2014. It allows players to create and customize a simian flu virus to infect the world and eradicate humanity whilst helping apes survive.

== Reception ==
=== Box office ===
Dawn of the Planet of the Apes was a success at the box office with many critics calling it "the summer's best popcorn film", and Deadline Hollywood commented saying it is "a franchise that will keep going and going, unless they screw it up". The film grossed $208.5 million in the United States and Canada, and $502.1 million in other countries, for a worldwide total of $710.6 million. Calculating in all expenses and revenues, Deadline Hollywood estimated that the film made a net profit of $182.18 million. It had a worldwide opening of $103.3 million which was the 11th highest of 2014. Worldwide it is the highest-grossing film in the Planet of the Apes franchise and the eighth-highest-grossing film of 2014.

In the United States and Canada, the film is the highest-grossing film in the Planet of the Apes franchise, unadjusted for inflation and the eighth-highest-grossing film of 2014. It opened on July 11, 2014, across 3,967 theaters and topped the box office on its opening day earning $27.7 million (including previews). During its traditional three-day opening, the film debuted at number one earning $72.6 million, which was 33% higher than its predecessor. Box Office Mojo pointed out that the film's good word of mouth as well as its predecessors', its darker tone, attachment of new characters and the first film's way of ending were all determining factors in the film's strong opening. It remained at the summit for two consecutive weekends in North America despite facing competition with The Purge: Anarchy in its second week.

Dawn of the Planet of the Apes earned $31.3 million during its opening weekend internationally from 4,913 screens in 26 markets, where it opened at No. 1 in 14 of those. International opening weekend tallies of more than $5 million were witnessed in the UK ($14.88 million), Mexico ($12.94 million), South Korea ($11.5 million), Russia ($9.99 million), Brazil with ($9.2 million) and Australia ($6.6 million). The film topped the box office outside North America for two non-consecutive weekends.

The film became a massive financial success in China, where it opened with $47 million on its opening weekend there. The robust debut helped the film top the international charts for the first time dethroning Guardians of the Galaxy and aided the film in passing $400 million internationally and $600 million globally. Fox reported that the sequel's debut in China was one of the best in history for a Western title, save for Iron Man 3, Transformers: Revenge of the Fallen and Transformers: Age of Extinction at that time. After playing for a month in theaters, it passed $100 million on its fourth weekend and became the fourth Hollywood film of the year to achieve such a milestone. In total, it went on to make $107.4 million there, of which the studio received $26.8 million profit.

=== Critical response ===
On review aggregator Rotten Tomatoes, the film holds a 91% approval rating based on 316 reviews, with an average rating of 7.90/10. The website's critics consensus reads, "With intelligence and emotional resonance to match its stunning special effects, Dawn of the Planet of the Apes expands on its predecessor with an exciting and ambitious burst of sci-fi achievement." Metacritic, which uses a weighted average, assigned the film a score of 79 out of 100 based on 48 critics, indicating "generally favorable" reviews. Audiences polled by CinemaScore gave the film an average grade of "A−" on an A+ to F scale.

Guy Lodge of Variety said, "An altogether smashing sequel to 2011's better-than-expected Rise of the Planet of the Apes, this vivid, violent extension of humanoid ape Caesar's troubled quest for independence bests its predecessor in nearly every technical and conceptual department, with incoming helmer Matt Reeves conducting the proceedings with more assertive genre elan than Rise journeyman Rupert Wyatt." Todd McCarthy of The Hollywood Reporter stated that the film "manages to do at least three things exceptionally well that are hard enough to pull off individually: Maintain a simmering level of tension without let-up for two hours, seriously improve on a very good first entry in a franchise and produce a powerful humanistic statement using a significantly simian cast of characters. In the annals of sequels, Dawn is to Rise of the Planet of the Apes what The Empire Strikes Back was to Star Wars—it's that much better." Tim Robey of The Daily Telegraph said, "There's evident patience and intelligence to the filmmaking all over, as well as an engagement with genuine ideas about diplomacy, deterrence, law and leadership. However often it risks monkey-mad silliness, it's impressively un-stupid." Drew McWeeny of HitFix awarded the film an "A+" grade and said "Dawn is not just a good genre movie or a good summer movie. It's a great science-fiction film, full-stop, and one of the year's very best movies so far."

Ty Burr of The Boston Globe wrote that "in bearing, speech, and agonized expressiveness, Serkis's Caesar conveys the conflicts of a king with almost Shakespearean grandeur." A. O. Scott of The New York Times praised the film for being able to balance out the action sequences and special effects with strong storytelling, writing that "Dawn is more than a bunch of occasionally thrilling action sequences, emotional gut punches and throwaway jokes arranged in predictable sequence. It is technically impressive and viscerally exciting, for sure, but it also gives you a lot to think, and even to care, about."

Less favorable reviews included Andrew O'Hehir at Salon.com who wrote, "Here's a rule that has gradually become clear to me: Any film that begins with one of those fake-news montages, where snippets of genuine CNN footage are stitched together to concoct a feeling of semi-urgency around its hackneyed apocalypse, already sucks even before it gets started. This one makes a dutiful attempt to struggle back from that suckage, but it all ends in yelling."

=== Home media ===
Dawn of the Planet of the Apes was released by 20th Century Fox Home Entertainment on Blu-ray 3D, Blu-ray and DVD on December 2, 2014. According to Nielsen VideoScan, it subsequently became the best-selling home video release for the week.

== Sequel ==
After seeing his cut of Dawn, 20th Century Fox and Chernin Entertainment signed Matt Reeves to return as director for a third installment of the reboot series. On January 6, 2014, Fox announced Reeves to direct as well as co-write along with Bomback, with a planned July 2016 release. Peter Chernin, Rick Jaffa and Amanda Silver will produce. In January 2015, Fox delayed the release to July 14, 2017. On May 14, 2015, the title was given as War of the Planet of the Apes. In September 2015, it was announced that Woody Harrelson had been cast as the film's antagonist. In October 2015, Steve Zahn was cast as a new ape in the film, re-titled as War for the Planet of the Apes.

== See also ==
- Uplift (science fiction)
