= List of accolades received by Alice in Wonderland (2010 film) =

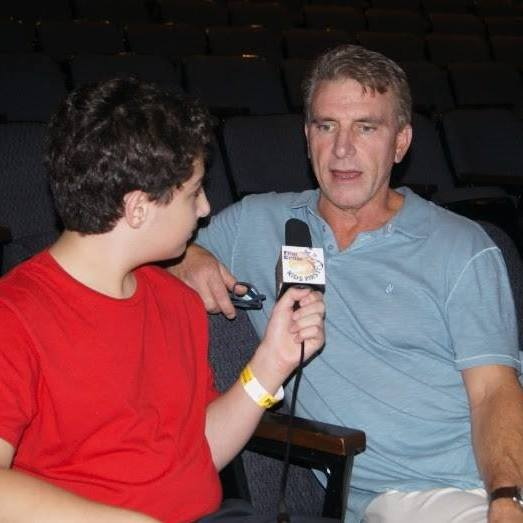
- Production designer Robert Stromberg (right) received numerous accolades including the Academy Award for Best Production Design
Awards and nominations
Award	Wins	Nominations
3D Creative Arts Awards	1	1
Academy Awards	2	3
American Cinema Editors	1	1
Annie Awards	1	1
Art Directors Guild	1	1
Australian Film Institute Award	1	1
BMI Film & TV Awards	1	1
British Academy Film Awards	2	5
Costume Designers Guild Awards	1	1
Critics' Choice Movie Awards	2	4
Empire Awards	0	2
Golden Eagle Award	0	1
Golden Globe Awards	0	3
Grammy Awards	0	1
Hollywood Post Alliance	1	1
International Film Music Critics Association Awards	1	2
Kids' Choice Awards	1	2
London Film Critics' Circle Awards	0	1
Motion Picture Sound Editors	0	1
MTV Movie Awards	0	3
National Movie Awards	0	2
People's Choice Awards	0	2
San Diego Film Critics Society Awards	0	2
Satellite Awards	2	5
Saturn Awards	2	5
Scream Awards	1	8
Taurus World Stunt Awards	0	1
Teen Choice Awards	1	6
Visual Effects Society Awards	0	2
Washington DC Area Film Critics Association Awards	0	1
Women's Image Network Awards	1	1
World Soundtrack Awards	0	1

Totals (Note: Certain award groups do not simply award one winner. They acknowledge several different recipients, have runners-up, and have third place. Since this is a specific recognition and is different from losing an award, runner-up mentions are considered wins in this award tally. For simplification and to avoid errors, each award in this list has been presumed to have had a prior nomination.)
- Wins: 23
- Nominations: 73

Alice in Wonderland is a 2010 American period adventure fantasy film directed by Tim Burton from a screenplay written by Linda Woolverton and produced by Walt Disney Pictures. A live-action adaptation and reimagining of Lewis Carroll's works, the film stars Mia Wasikowska in the title role, with Johnny Depp, Anne Hathaway, Helena Bonham Carter, Crispin Glover, and Matt Lucas, while featuring the voices of Alan Rickman, Stephen Fry, Michael Sheen, and Timothy Spall.

The film premiered in London at the Odeon Leicester Square on February 25, 2010, and was released in the United Kingdom and the United States through the Disney Digital 3D, RealD 3D, and IMAX 3D formats as well as in conventional theaters on March 5, 2010. The film earned $1.025 billion worldwide, finishing its theatrical run as the second-highest-grossing film of 2010. Neverthelss, the review aggregator Rotten Tomatoes surveyed 278 critics' reviews, founding 51% to be positive.

Alice in Wonderland received three nominations at the 83rd Academy Awards, and won Best Art Direction and Best Costume Design. It further received three nominations at the 68th Golden Globe Awards, including Best Motion Picture – Musical or Comedy, and five nominations at the 64th British Academy Film Awards, winning two for Best Costume Design and Best Makeup and Hair. As of 2011, the film has received 23 awards out of 73 nominations.

== Accolades ==
Award	Date of ceremony	Category	Recipient	Result	Ref.
3D Creative Arts Awards	February 9, 2011	Best 2D to 3D Conversion	Alice in Wonderland	Won	
Academy Awards	February 27, 2011	Best Art Direction	Robert Stromberg and Karen O'Hara	Won	
Academy Awards	February 27, 2011	Best Costume Design	Colleen Atwood	Won	
Academy Awards	February 27, 2011	Best Visual Effects	Ken Ralston, David Schaub, Carey Villegas and Sean Phillips	Nominated	
American Cinema Editors Awards	February 19, 2011	Best Edited Feature Film – Comedy or Musical	Chris Lebenzon	Won	
Annie Awards	February 5, 2011	Best Character Animation in a Feature Production	Ryan Page	Won	
Art Directors Guild Awards	February 5, 2011	Excellence in Production Design for a Fantasy Film	Robert Stromberg	Nominated	
Australian Film Institute Awards	December 11, 2010	Best Actress	Mia Wasikowska	Won	
BMI Film & TV Awards	May 20, 2010	Film Music Award	Danny Elfman	Won	
British Academy Film Awards	February 13, 2011	Best Costume Design	Colleen Atwood	Won	
British Academy Film Awards	February 13, 2011	Best Film Music	Danny Elfman	Nominated	
British Academy Film Awards	February 13, 2011	Best Production Design	Robert Stromberg and Karen O'Hara	Nominated	
British Academy Film Awards	February 13, 2011	Best Special Visual Effects	Ken Ralston, David Schaub, Carey Villegas and Sean Phillips	Nominated	
British Academy Film Awards	February 13, 2011	Best Makeup and Hair	Valli O'Reilly and Paul Gooch	Won	
Costume Designers Guild Awards	February 22, 2011	Excellence in Costume Design for a Fantasy Film	Colleen Atwood	Won	
Critics' Choice Movie Awards	January 14, 2011	Best Costume Design	Colleen Atwood	Won	
Critics' Choice Movie Awards	January 14, 2011	Best Makeup	Jaremy Aiello	Won	
Critics' Choice Movie Awards	January 14, 2011	Best Visual Effects	Ken Ralston, Carey Villegas, David Schaub and Tom Peitzman	Nominated	
Critics' Choice Movie Awards	January 14, 2011	Best Art Direction	Robert Stromberg and Karen O'Hara	Nominated	
Empire Awards	March 27, 2011	Best Sci-Fi/Fantasy	Alice in Wonderland	Nominated	
Empire Awards	March 27, 2011	Best Newcomer	Mia Wasikowska	Nominated	
Golden Eagle Award	January 21, 2011	Best Foreign Language Film	Alice in Wonderland	Nominated	
Golden Globe Awards	January 16, 2011	Best Motion Picture – Musical or Comedy	Alice in Wonderland	Nominated	
Golden Globe Awards	January 16, 2011	Best Actor – Motion Picture Musical or Comedy	Johnny Depp	Nominated	
Golden Globe Awards	January 16, 2011	Best Original Score	Danny Elfman	Nominated	
Grammy Awards	February 13, 2011	Best Score Soundtrack Album For Motion Picture, Television Or Other Visual Media	Danny Elfman	Nominated	
Hollywood Post Alliance	November 11, 2010	Outstanding Color Grading – Feature Film	Stefan Sonnenfeld	Won	
International Film Music Critics Association Awards	February 24, 2011	Film Music Composition of the Year	Danny Elfman – ("Alice's Theme")	Won	
International Film Music Critics Association Awards	February 24, 2011	Best Original Score for a Fantasy/Science Fiction/Horror Film	Danny Elfman	Nominated	
Kids' Choice Awards	April 2, 2011	Favorite Movie	Alice in Wonderland	Nominated	
Kids' Choice Awards	April 2, 2011	Favorite Movie Actor	Johnny Depp	Won	
Motion Picture Sound Editors	February 20, 2011	Outstanding Achievement in Sound Editing – Music in a Feature Film	Bill Abbott, Michael Higham (supervising music editors); Denise Okimoto, Curtis Roush, Ryan Rubin (music editors)	Nominated	
MTV Movie Awards	June 5, 2011	Global Superstar	Johnny Depp	Nominated	
MTV Movie Awards	June 5, 2011	Best Movie	Alice in Wonderland	Nominated	
MTV Movie Awards	June 5, 2011	Best Villain	Helena Bonham Carter	Nominated	
National Movie Awards	May 26, 2010	Best Performance	Helena Bonham Carter	Nominated	
National Movie Awards	May 26, 2010	Best Performance	Johnny Depp	Nominated	
National Movie Awards	May 26, 2010	Best Fantasy	Alice in Wonderland	Nominated	
People's Choice Awards	January 5, 2011	Favorite Movie	Alice in Wonderland	Nominated	
People's Choice Awards	January 5, 2011	Favorite Drama Movie	Alice in Wonderland	Nominated	
San Diego Film Critics Society Awards	December 14, 2010	Best Production Design	Robert Stromberg	Nominated	
San Diego Film Critics Society Awards	December 14, 2010	Best Score	Danny Elfman	Nominated	
Satellite Awards	December 19, 2010	Best Visual Effects	Ken Ralston, Carey Villegas, David Schaub and Sean Phillips	Won	
Satellite Awards	December 19, 2010	Best Costume Design	Colleen Atwood	Won	
Satellite Awards	December 19, 2010	Best Art Direction and Production Design	Robert Stromberg and Stefan Dechant	Nominated	
Satellite Awards	December 19, 2010	Best Motion Picture, Animated or Mixed Media	Alice in Wonderland	Nominated	
Satellite Awards	December 19, 2010	Best Original Song	Avril Lavigne	Nominated	
Saturn Awards	June 23, 2011	Best Fantasy Film	Alice in Wonderland	Won	
Saturn Awards	June 23, 2011	Best Costume	Colleen Atwood	Won	
Saturn Awards	June 23, 2011	Best Make-Up	Lindsay MacGowan and Shane Mahan	Nominated	
Saturn Awards	June 23, 2011	Best Production Design	Robert Stromberg	Nominated	
Saturn Awards	June 23, 2011	Best Special Effects	Ken Ralston, Carey Villegas, David Schaub and Tom Peitzman	Nominated	
Scream Awards	October 16, 2010	Ultimate Scream	Alice in Wonderland	Nominated	
Scream Awards	October 16, 2010	Best Fantasy Movie	Alice in Wonderland	Nominated	
Scream Awards	October 16, 2010	Best Director	Tim Burton	Nominated	
Scream Awards	October 16, 2010	Best Fantasy Actress	Mia Wasikowska	Nominated	
Scream Awards	October 16, 2010	Best Breakout Performance – Female	Mia Wasikowska	Nominated	
Scream Awards	October 16, 2010	Best Fantasy Actor	Johnny Depp	Nominated	
Scream Awards	October 16, 2010	Best Supporting Actress	Anne Hathaway	Won	
Scream Awards	October 16, 2010	3-D Top Three	Alice in Wonderland	Nominated	
Taurus World Stunt Awards	May 20, 2011	Best Overall Stunt by a Stunt Woman	Tarah Paige	Nominated	
Teen Choice Awards	August 8, 2010	Choice Movie: Fantasy	Alice in Wonderland	Nominated	
Teen Choice Awards	August 8, 2010	Choice Movie Actor: Fantasy	Johnny Depp	Nominated	
Teen Choice Awards	August 8, 2010	Choice Movie: Female Scene Stealer	Anne Hathaway	Nominated	
Teen Choice Awards	August 8, 2010	Choice Movie Actress: Fantasy	Mia Wasikowska	Nominated	
Teen Choice Awards	August 8, 2010	Choice Movie: Female Breakout Star	Mia Wasikowska	Nominated	
Teen Choice Awards	August 8, 2010	Choice Movie: Fight	Mia Wasikowska vs. The Jabberwock	Won	
Visual Effects Society Awards	February 1, 2011	Outstanding Visual Effects in a Visual Effects-Driven Feature Motion Picture	Ken Ralston, Carey Villegas, David Schaub and Tom Peitzman	Nominated	
Visual Effects Society Awards	February 1, 2011	Outstanding Compositing in a Feature Motion Picture (Stolen Tarts)	Lisa Deaner, Orde Stevanoski, Aaron Kupferman and Ruben Flores	Nominated	
Washington D.C. Area Film Critics Association Awards	December 6, 2010	Best Art Direction	Alice in Wonderland	Nominated	
Women's Image Network Awards	December 7, 2010	Actress Feature Film	Helena Bonham Carter	Won	
World Soundtrack Awards	August 23, 2010	Soundtrack Composer of the Year	Danny Elfman	Nominated	

== See also ==
- 2010 in film
- Films and television programmes based on Alice in Wonderland
