= Satellite Award for Best Visual Effects =

Annual media award

- Awarded for: Best Visual Effects
- Country: United States
- Presented by: International Press Academy
- First award: 1996
- Currently held by: Simone Coco, Neil Corbould, Jeff Sutherland, and Alex Wuttke – Mission: Impossible – Dead Reckoning Part One (2023)

The Satellite Award for Best Visual Effects is one of the annual Satellite Awards given by the International Press Academy.

== Winners and nominees ==
=== 1990s ===
Year	Film	Recipient(s)
1996	Independence Day	Volker Engel and Douglas Smith
1996	Dragonheart	Scott Squires
1996	Mars Attacks!	Jim Mitchell, Michael L. Fink, David Andrews
1996	Star Trek: First Contact	John Knoll
1996	Twister	Stefen Fangmeier
1997	Contact	Ken Ralston
1997	The Fifth Element	Mark Stetson
1997	Men in Black	Richard Baker
1997	Starship Troopers	Phil Tippett, Scott E. Anderson
1997	Titanic	Robert Legato
1998	What Dreams May Come	Ellen Somers
1998	Armageddon	Richard R. Hoover, Pat McClung
1998	Babe: Pig in the City	Rhythm & Hues, Mill Film, Animal Logic Film
1998	Saving Private Ryan	Neil Corbould, Stefen Fangmeier, Roger Guyett
1998	Star Trek: Insurrection	Terry D. Frazee
1999	Stuart Little	Jerome Chen, John Dykstra, Henry F. Anderson III and Eric Allard
1999	The Matrix	Steve Courtley, Brian Cox, John Gaeta
1999	The Mummy	John Andrew Berton Jr., Chris Corbould, Mark Freund, Steve Hamilton
1999	Sleepy Hollow	Jim Mitchell, Joss Williams
1999	Star Wars: Episode I – The Phantom Menace	Peter Hutchinson, John Knox, Judith Weaver, Dennis Muren
1999	Titus	Kyle Cooper

=== 2000s ===
Year	Film	Recipient(s)
2000	Gladiator	John Nelson
2000	Charlie's Angels	Pat McClung
2000	How the Grinch Stole Christmas	Kevin Scott Mack
2000	Mission: Impossible 2	Richard Yuricich
2000	Vertical Limit	Kent Houston
2001	Moulin Rouge!	Chris Godfrey
2001	Harry Potter and the Philosopher's Stone	Robert Legato, Nick Davis, John Richardson, Roger Guyett
2001	Jurassic Park III	Jim Mitchell
2001	The Lord of the Rings: The Fellowship of the Ring	Jim Rygiel, Richard Taylor, Alex Funke, Randall William Cook
2001	Pearl Harbor	Eric Brevig
2002	The Lord of the Rings: The Two Towers	Jim Rygiel, Joe Letteri, Randall William Cook and Alex Funke
2002	Gangs of New York	R. Bruce Steinheimer, Michael Owens, Edward Hirsh, Jon Alexander
2002	Minority Report	Scott Farrar
2002	Road to Perdition	Michael J. McAlister
2002	Spider-Man	John Dykstra
2003	Master and Commander: The Far Side of the World	Stefen Fangmeier, Nathan McGuinness, Robert Stromberg and Dan Sudick
2003	Kill Bill: Volume 1	Howard Berger, Greg Nicotero
2003	The Last Samurai	Jeffrey A. Okun
2003	The Lord of the Rings: The Return of the King	Jim Rygiel, Joe Letteri, Randall William Cook, Alex Funke
2003	Pirates of the Caribbean: The Curse of the Black Pearl	John Knoll
2003	Terminator 3: Rise of the Machines	Pablo Helman, Danny Gordon Taylor, Allen Hall, John Rosengrant
2004	The Aviator	Andy Brown and Kirsty Millar
2004	House of Flying Daggers (Shi mian mai fu)	Robert Legato, Peter G. Travers, Matthew Gratzner and R. Bruce Steinheimer
2004	Collateral	John E. Sullivan
2004	Eternal Sunshine of the Spotless Mind	Michele Ferrone, Louis Morin
2004	Sky Captain and the World of Tomorrow	Stephen Lawes, Scott E. Anderson, Darin Hollings
2004	Spider-Man 2	John Dykstra, Scott Stokdyk, Anthony LaMolinara, John Frazier
2005	Star Wars: Episode III – Revenge of the Sith	John Knoll and Hal Hickel
2005	Kingdom of Heaven	Tom Wood
2005	Kung Fu Hustle (Kung fu)	Frankie Chung
2005	Sin City	Robert Rodriguez
2005	War of the Worlds	Dennis Muren, Pablo Helman, Randal M. Dutra, Daniel Sudick
2006	Pirates of the Caribbean: Dead Man's Chest	John Knoll and Hal Hickel
2006	The Da Vinci Code	Kevin Ahern
2006	Flags of Our Fathers	Michael Owens, Matthew E. Butler, Bryan Grill, Steve Riley
2006	The Fountain	Jeremy Dawson, Dan Schrecker
2006	Pan's Labyrinth (El laberinto del fauno)	Everett Burrell, Edward Irastorza
2006	V for Vendetta	Dan Glass
2006	X-Men: The Last Stand	John Bruno
2007	300	Chris Watts, Grant Freckelton, Derek Wentworth and Daniel Leduc
2007	Beowulf	Rob Engle, Jerome Chen, Sean Phillips, Kenn McDonald, Michael Lantieri
2007	The Bourne Ultimatum	Peter Chiang, Charlie Noble, David Vickery, Mattias Lindahl
2007	Enchanted	Thomas Schelesny, Matt Jacobs, Tom Gibbons
2007	The Golden Compass	Michael L. Fink
2007	Transformers	Scott Farrar
2008	Australia	Chris Godfrey, James E. Price and Diana Giorgiutti
2008	The Dark Knight	Nick Davis, Chris Corbould, Tim Webber, Paul J. Franklin
2008	The Day the Earth Stood Still	Jeffrey A. Okun
2008	Iron Man	John Nelson, Shane Mahan, Ben Snow, Daniel Sudick
2008	Quantum of Solace	Chris Corbould, Kevin Tod Haug
2009	2012	Volker Engel, Marc Weigert and Mike Vézina
2009	District 9	Robert Habros, Charlie Bradbury, Stephen Pepper, Winston Helgason
2009	Fantastic Mr Fox	Tim Ledbury
2009	The Imaginarium of Doctor Parnassus	John Paul Docherty, Richard Bain
2009	Red Cliff (Chi bi)	Craig Hayes
2009	Transformers: Revenge of the Fallen	Scott Farrar, Scott Benza, Wayne Billheimer, John Frazier

=== 2010s ===
Year	Film	Recipient(s)
2010	Alice in Wonderland	Ken Ralston, David Schaub, Carey Villegas and Sean Phillips
2010	127 Hours	Adam Gascoyne, James Winnifrith, Tim Caplan
2010	Inception	Paul J. Franklin, Chris Corbould, Andrew Lockley, Pete Bebb
2010	Iron Man 2	Janek Sirrs, Ben Snow, Ged Wright
2010	Legend of the Guardians: The Owls of Ga'Hoole	Grant Freckelton, Chris Bone, Craig Welsh
2010	Unstoppable	Nathan McGuinness, Paul O'Shea
2011	Hugo	Robert Legato, Ben Grossmann, Alex Henning and Adam Watkins
2011	Harry Potter and the Deathly Hallows – Part 2	David Vickery, Greg Butler, John Richardson, Tim Burke
2011	Rise of the Planet of the Apes	Jeff Capogreco, Joe Letteri, R. Christopher White
2011	Super 8	Dennis Muren, Kim Libreri, Paul Kavanagh, Russell Earl
2011	Transformers: Dark of the Moon	John Frazier, Matthew Butler, Scott Benza, Scott Farrar
2011	War Horse	Ben Morris
2012	Flight	Jim Gibbs, Kevin Baillie, Michael Lantieri and Ryan Tudhope
2012	Cloud Atlas	Dan Glass, Geoffrey Hancock, Stephane Ceretti
2012	The Dark Knight Rises	Chris Corbould, Paul Franklin
2012	Life of Pi	Bill Westenhofer, Guillaume Rocheron
2012	Prometheus	Charley Henley, Martin Hill, Richard Stammers
2012	Skyfall	Andrew Whitehurst, Arundi Asregadoo, Steve Begg
2013	Gravity	Tim Webber, Chris Lawrence, Dave Shirk and Neil Corbould
2013	All Is Lost	Brendon O’Dell, Colin Davies, Robert Munroe
2013	The Croods	Markus Manninen, Matt Baer
2013	Oz the Great and Powerful	James Schwalm, Scott Stokdyk, Troy Saliba
2013	Rush	Antoine Moulineau, Jody Johnson, Mark Hodgkins
2013	World War Z	Andrew R. Jones, Jessica Norman, Matt Johnson, Scott Farrar
2014	Dawn of the Planet of the Apes	Joe Letteri, Dan Lemmon and Matt Kutcher
2014	Guardians of the Galaxy	Stephane Ceretti
2014	Interstellar	Andrew Lockley, Ian Hunter, Paul Franklin, Scott Fisher
2014	Into the Woods	Christian Irles, Matt Johnson, Stefano Pepin
2014	Noah	Ben Snow, Burt Dalton, Dan Schrecker, Marc Chu
2014	Transformers: Age of Extinction	John Frazier, Patrick Tubach, Scott Benza, Scott Farrar
2015	The Walk	Jim Gibbs, Kevin Baillie, Viktor Muller and Sébastien Moreau
2015	Everest	Dadi Einarsson, Matthias Bjarnason, Glen Pratt, Richard Van Den Bergh
2015	Jurassic World	Tim Alexander, Glen McIntosh, Tony Plett, Michael Meinardus
2015	Mad Max: Fury Road	Andrew Jackson, Tom Wood, Dan Oliver, Andy Williams
2015	The Martian	Richard Stammers, Anders Langlands, Chris Lawrence, Steven Warner
2015	Spectre	Steven Begg, Chris Corbould
2016	The Jungle Book	Robert Legato, Dan Lemmon, Andrew R. Jones and Adam Valdez
2016	The BFG	Joe Letteri, Ken McGaugh, Mark Gee, Kevin Andrew Smith
2016	Billy Lynn's Long Halftime Walk	Mark O. Forker, Pavel Hristov, Michael Huber, Robert J. Bruce
2016	Deadpool	Ryan Tudhope, Jonathan Rothbart, Vincent Cirelli
2016	Doctor Strange	Stephane Ceretti, Paul Corbould, Richard Bluff, Vincent Cirelli
2016	Sully	Michael Owens, Mark Curtis, Bryan Litson, Jan Dubberke
2017	Blade Runner 2049	John Nelson, Paul Lambert, Richard R. Hoover and Gerd Nefzer
2017	Alien: Covenant	
2017	Dunkirk	
2017	The Shape of Water	
2017	War for the Planet of the Apes	
2017	Wonder Woman	
2018	Black Panther	Geoffrey Baumann, Jesse James Chisholm, Craig Hammack and Dan Sudick
2018	Avengers: Infinity War	
2018	Fantastic Beasts: The Crimes of Grindelwald	
2018	Jurassic World: Fallen Kingdom	
2018	Rampage	
2018	Ready Player One	
2019	Alita: Battle Angel	Joe Letteri and Eric Saindon
2019	Avengers: Endgame	Matt Aitken, Dan DeLeeuw, Russell Earl, and Dan Sudick
2019	Ford v Ferrari	Mark Byers, Olivier Dumont, and Kathy Siegel
2019	The Irishman	Pablo Helman
2019	Joker	Mathew Giampa, Bryan Godwin, and Edwin Rivera
2019	The Lion King	Andrew R. Jones, Robert Legato, Elliot Newman, and Adam Valdez

=== 2020s ===
Year	Film	Recipient(s)
2020	Tenet	Scott R. Fisher and Andrew Jackson
2020	Birds of Prey	Thrain Shadbolt and Kevin Souls
2020	Greyhound	Peter Bebb and Nathan McGuinness
2020	Mank	Simon Carr, Pablo Helman, James Pastorius, and Wei Zheng
2020	The Midnight Sky	Matt Kasmir and Chris Lawrence
2020	Mulan	Sean Andrew Faden
2021	Dune	Brian Connor, Paul Lambert, Tristan Myles, and Gerd Nefzer
2021	Eternals	Matt Aitken, Daniele Bigi, Stephane Ceretti, and Neil Corbould
2021	Godzilla vs. Kong	John Desjardin, Bryan Hirota, Tamara Watts Kent, and Kevin Smith
2021	Shang-Chi and the Legend of the Ten Rings	Joe Farrell, Dan Oliver, Christopher Townsend, and Sean Noel Walker
2021	The Suicide Squad	Jonathan Fawkner, Kelvin McIlwain, Dan Sudick, and Guy Williams
2021	The Tomorrow War	Carmelo Leggiero, James E. Price, J. D. Schwalm, Randall Starr, and Sheldon Stopsack
2022	Avatar: The Way of Water	Richard Baneham, Daniel Barrett, Joe Letteri, and Eric Saindon
2022	Babylon	Jay Cooper, Ebrahim Jahromi, Kevin Martel, and Elia Popov
2022	The Batman	Russell Earl, Anders Langlands, Dan Lemmon, and Dominic Tuohy
2022	Good Night Oppy	Ivan Busquets, Marko Chulev, Abishek Nair, and Steven Nichols
2022	RRR	V. Srinivas Mohan
2022	Top Gun: Maverick	Scott R. Fisher, Seth Hill, Bryan Litson, and Ryan Tudhope
2023	Mission: Impossible – Dead Reckoning Part One	Simone Coco, Neil Corbould, Jeff Sutherland, and Alex Wuttke
2023	The Creator	Jay Cooper, Ian Comley, Neil Corbould, and Andrew Roberts
2023	Napoleon	Henry Badgett, Simone Coco, Neil Corbould, Charley Henley, and Luc-Ewen Martin-Fenouillet
2023	Oppenheimer	Dave Drzewiecki, Scott R. Fisher, Andrew Jackson, and Giacomo Mineo
2023	Spider-Man: Across the Spider-Verse	Bret St. Clair, Pav Grochola, Alan Hawkins, and Michael Lasker
2023	Transformers: Rise of the Beasts	Matt Aitken, Gary Brozenich, Ilya Churinov, Richard Little, Guillaume Murray, and J. D. Schwalm
