= List of remakes and adaptations of Disney animated films =

Disney produces the films listed here.

This is a list of live-action and/or photorealistic remakes produced by Disney of its animated films. The list also includes the films' sequels and spin-offs within their fictional universe. This list does not include: remakes of live-action/animation hybrid films (such as Pete's Dragon), the made-for-television film Geppetto, the direct-to-video film The Jungle Book: Mowgli's Story, animated films that were produced by another studio and/or later adapted as live-action films by Disney, live-action films made by another studio based on the same story as the Disney films, and/or live-action films based on animated television shows (whether based on Disney shows such as Kim Possible, and/or Chip 'n Dale: Rescue Rangers, and/or on animated shows from third-party studios such as George of the Jungle, Mr. Magoo, Inspector Gadget, and/or Underdog).

== Released ==
Film	Original film	Release date	Director(s)	Writer(s)	Producer(s)	Composer(s)	Co-production with	Ref.
Rudyard Kipling's The Jungle Book	The Jungle Book (1967) (Note: While it was released under the Disney brand, the film was an independent production that Disney acquired the distribution rights to in certain territories. Aside from that, there are included some similarities to Disney's animated film.)	December 25, 1994	Stephen Sommers	Stephen Sommers, Ronald Yanover and Mark Geldman	Edward S. Feldman and Raju Patel	Basil Poledouris	Vegahom Europe, Baloo Productions and Jungle Book Films	
101 Dalmatians	One Hundred and One Dalmatians (1961)	November 27, 1996	Stephen Herek	John Hughes	John Hughes and Ricardo Mestres	Michael Kamen	Great Oaks Entertainment	
102 Dalmatians	One Hundred and One Dalmatians (1961) (Note: 102 Dalmatians is a sequel to 101 Dalmatians (1996).)	November 22, 2000	Kevin Lima	Kristen Buckley, Brian Regan, Bob Tzudiker and Noni White (screenplay) Kristen Buckley and Brian Regan (story)	Edward S. Feldman	David Newman	Cruella Productions and Kanzaman S.A.M. Films	
Alice in Wonderland	Alice in Wonderland (1951) (Note: While the 2010 film incorporates elements from the 1951 animated version, it is an independent reimagining rather than a direct remake. The plot functions as a thematic sequel to Lewis Carroll's original novels, featuring a 19-year-old Alice returning to Wonderland, and establishes its own distinct continuity.)	March 5, 2010	Tim Burton	Linda Woolverton	Richard D. Zanuck, Joe Roth, Suzanne Todd and Jennifer Todd	Danny Elfman	The Zanuck Company, Roth Films and Team Todd	
The Sorcerer's Apprentice	Fantasia (1940) (Note: Segment: The Sorcerer's Apprentice, which was also featured in Fantasia 2000.)	July 16, 2010	Jon Turteltaub	Doug Miro, Carlo Bernard and Matt Lopez (screenplay) Lawrence Konner, Mark Rosenthal and Matt Lopez (story)	Jerry Bruckheimer	Trevor Rabin	Jerry Bruckheimer Films, Saturn Films and Broken Road Productions	
Maleficent	Sleeping Beauty (1959) (Note: Maleficent is a spin-off/reimagining of Sleeping Beauty (1959).)	May 30, 2014	Robert Stromberg	Linda Woolverton	Joe Roth	James Newton Howard	Roth Films	
Cinderella	Cinderella (1950)	March 13, 2015	Kenneth Branagh	Chris Weitz	Simon Kinberg, Allison Shearmur and David Barron	Patrick Doyle (score) Mack David, Al Hoffman and Jerry Livingston^{O} Patrick Doyle, Kenneth Branagh and Tommy Danvers^{N} (songs)	Kinberg Genre, Allison Shearmur Productions and Beagle Pug Films	
The Jungle Book	The Jungle Book (1967)	April 15, 2016	Jon Favreau	Justin Marks	Jon Favreau and Brigham Taylor	John Debney (Note: Original The Jungle Book themes by George Bruns) (score) Richard M. Sherman, Robert B. Sherman and Terry Gilkyson (songs)	Fairview Entertainment	
Alice Through the Looking Glass	Alice in Wonderland (1951) (Note: Alice Through the Looking Glass is a sequel to Alice in Wonderland (2010).)	May 27, 2016	James Bobin	Linda Woolverton	Joe Roth, Suzanne Todd, Jennifer Todd and Tim Burton	Danny Elfman	Roth Films, Team Todd and Tim Burton Productions	
Beauty and the Beast	Beauty and the Beast (1991)	March 17, 2017	Bill Condon	Stephen Chbosky and Evan Spiliotopoulos	David Hoberman and Todd Lieberman	Alan Menken^{R} (score) Alan Menken^{R} Howard Ashman^{O} Tim Rice^{N} (songs)	Mandeville Films	
Christopher Robin	Winnie the Pooh films (Note: Christopher Robin acts as a sequel to the Winnie the Pooh franchise, mainly the Walt Disney Animation Studios-made Winnie the Pooh featurettes and films.)	August 3, 2018	Marc Forster	Alex Ross Perry, Tom McCarthy and Allison Schroeder (screenplay) Greg Brooker and Mark Steven Johnson (story)	Brigham Taylor and Kristin Burr	Jon Brion and Geoff Zanelli (score) Richard M. Sherman (songs)	2DUX²	
Dumbo	Dumbo (1941)	March 29, 2019	Tim Burton	Ehren Kruger	Justin Springer, Ehren Kruger, Derek Frey and Katterli Frauenfelder	Danny Elfman (Note: Original Dumbo themes by Frank Churchill and Oliver Wallace) (score) Frank Churchill, Oliver Wallace and Ned Washington (songs)	Tim Burton Productions, Infinite Detective Productions and Secret Machine Entertainment	
Aladdin	Aladdin (1992)	May 24, 2019	Guy Ritchie	John August and Guy Ritchie	Dan Lin and Jonathan Eirich	Alan Menken^{R} (score) Alan Menken^{R} Howard Ashman and Tim Rice^{O} Benj Pasek and Justin Paul^{N} (songs)	Rideback	
The Lion King (Note: The film, aside from its opening shot, was made with photorealistic computer animation.)	The Lion King (1994)	July 19, 2019	Jon Favreau	Jeff Nathanson	Jon Favreau, Karen Gilchrist and Jeffrey Silver	Hans Zimmer^{R} (score) Elton John^{R} Tim Rice^{O} Beyoncé, Ilya Salmanzadeh and Labrinth^{N} (songs)	Fairview Entertainment	
Maleficent: Mistress of Evil	Sleeping Beauty (1959) (Note: Maleficent: Mistress of Evil is a sequel to Maleficent (2014).)	October 18, 2019	Joachim Rønning	Linda Woolverton, Noah Harpster and Micah Fitzerman-Blue	Joe Roth, Angelina Jolie and Duncan Henderson	Geoff Zanelli	Roth/Kirschenbaum Films	
Lady and the Tramp (Note: Released as a Disney+ original.)	Lady and the Tramp (1955)	November 12, 2019	Charlie Bean	Andrew Bujalski and Kari Granlund	Brigham Taylor	Joseph Trapanese (score) Sonny Burke and Peggy Lee^{O} Nate "Rocket" Wonder, Roman GianArthur and Janelle Monáe^{N} (songs)	Taylor Made	
Mulan (Note: The film was released through Disney+ streaming service with a premium fee due to the effects of COVID-19 restrictions. However, it also had a theatrical release in several countries where theaters were open.)	Mulan (1998)	September 4, 2020	Niki Caro	Elizabeth Martin, Lauren Hynek, Rick Jaffa and Amanda Silver	Chris Bender, Tendo Nagenda, Jason T. Reed and Jake Weiner	Harry Gregson-Williams (Note: Original Mulan themes by Jerry Goldsmith) (score) Matthew Wilder and David Zippel^{O} Harry Gregson-Williams, Billy Crabtree, Rosi Golan and Jamie Hartman^{N} (songs)	Jason T. Reed Productions and Good Fear Productions	
Cruella	One Hundred and One Dalmatians (1961) (Note: Cruella is a prequel and spin-off of One Hundred and One Dalmatians (1961).)	May 28, 2021	Craig Gillespie	Dana Fox and Tony McNamara (screenplay) Aline Brosh McKenna, Kelly Marcel and Steve Zissis (story)	Andrew Gunn, Marc Platt and Kristin Burr	Nicholas Britell	Gunn Films and Marc Platt Productions	
Pinocchio	Pinocchio (1940)	September 8, 2022	Robert Zemeckis	Robert Zemeckis and Chris Weitz	Andrew Milano, Chris Weitz, Robert Zemeckis and Derek Hogue	Alan Silvestri (score) Leigh Harline and Ned Washington^{O} Alan Silvestri and Glen Ballard^{N} (songs)	ImageMovers and Depth of Field Studios	
Peter Pan & Wendy	Peter Pan (1953)	April 28, 2023	David Lowery	David Lowery and Toby Halbrooks	Joe Roth and Jim Whitaker	Daniel Hart	Whitaker Entertainment and Roth/Kirschenbaum Films	
The Little Mermaid	The Little Mermaid (1989)	May 26, 2023	Rob Marshall	David Magee	Rob Marshall, John DeLuca, Lin-Manuel Miranda and Marc Platt	Alan Menken^{R} (score) Alan Menken^{R} Howard Ashman^{O} Lin-Manuel Miranda^{N} (songs)	DeLuca Marshall and Marc Platt Productions	
Mufasa: The Lion King (Note: The film was made with photorealistic computer animation.)	The Lion King (1994) (Note: The film is a sequel/prequel to The Lion King (2019).)	December 20, 2024	Barry Jenkins	Jeff Nathanson	Adele Romanski and Mark Ceryak	Dave Metzger (Note: Original The Lion King themes by Hans Zimmer) (score) Lin-Manuel Miranda (songs)	—N/a	
Snow White	Snow White and the Seven Dwarfs (1937)	March 21, 2025	Marc Webb	Erin Cressida Wilson	Marc Platt and Jared LeBoff	Jeff Morrow (score) Frank Churchill and Larry Morey^{O} Benj Pasek and Justin Paul^{N} (songs)	Marc Platt Productions	
Lilo & Stitch	Lilo & Stitch (2002) (Note: The film is primarily a remake of Lilo & Stitch (2002). However, some elements of the film are also based on the Lilo & Stitch franchise in general.)	May 23, 2025	Dean Fleischer Camp	Chris Kekaniokalani Bright and Mike Van Waes	Dan Lin and Jonathan Eirich	Dan Romer	Rideback and Blue Koala Pictures, Inc.	
Moana	Moana (2016)	July 10, 2026	Thomas Kail	Jared Bush and Dana Ledoux Miller	Dwayne Johnson, Beau Flynn, Dany Garcia, Hiram Garcia and Lin-Manuel Miranda	Mark Mancina^{R} (score) Mark Mancina, Lin-Manuel Miranda and Opetaia Foaʻi^{R} (songs)	Seven Bucks Productions, Flynn Picture Co. and 5000 Broadway Productions	

== Upcoming/In development ==
Film	Original film	Release date	Director(s)	Writer(s)	Producer(s)	Composer(s)	Co-production with	Production status	Ref.
Tangled	Tangled (2010)	March 31, 2028	Michael Gracey	Jennifer Kaytin Robinson and Michael Montemayor	Kristin Burr	TBA	Burr! Productions	Filming	
Lilo & Stitch 2	Lilo & Stitch (2002) (Note: The film will be a sequel to Lilo & Stitch (2025).)	May 26, 2028	Chris Sanders	Chris Sanders	Jonathan Eirich	TBA	Rideback	Filming	
Gaston	Beauty and the Beast (1991)	TBA	TBA	Dave Callaham	Michelle Rejwan	TBA	TBA	In development	
Stepsisters	Cinderella (1950)	TBA	Akiva Schaffer	Akiva Schaffer, Dan Gregor and Doug Mand	Ali Bell	TBA	TBA	In development	
Untitled Princess Tiana film	The Princess and the Frog (2009) (Note: The film serving as a direct spin-off to the animated film.)	TBA	TBA	Colman Domingo and Robert O'Hara	TBA	TBA	TBA	In development	
Untitled Sleeping Beauty film	Sleeping Beauty (1959)	TBA	Dan Trachtenberg	Dan Trachtenberg, Rayna McClendon, Alex Anfanger and Dan Schimpf	Dan Trachtenberg and Ben Rosenblatt	TBA	TBA	In development	

Notes

- An ^{O} indicates the songwriter only wrote songs for its original version that were featured in the remake
- An ^{N} indicates the songwriter only wrote songs for its remake
- An ^{R} indicates the songwriter/composer worked on both the original version and its remake

== Scrapped and stalled projects ==
A live-action prequel to Aladdin titled Genies, written by Mark Swift and Damian Shannon and produced by Tripp Vinson, was announced in July 2015, but there have been no updates about the project since then. A spin-off film of the 2019 remake, focused on Prince Anders, was announced for Disney+ in December 2019, with Billy Magnussen reprising his role. After some time without any news updates, Magnussen stated that the project was still in development in April 2021, which he reconfirmed in the following year. In February 2020, Variety confirmed that a sequel to the remake was in development, with John Gatins and Andrea Berloff set to write the script. Dan Lin and Jonathan Eirich were set to return as producers, and Mena Massoud, Will Smith, and Naomi Scott were expected to reprise their roles. In December 2023, Massoud said that "I don't have any updates" about the sequel and that he was unsure if it would be made.

A sequel to The Jungle Book was reported to be in development in April 2016. Jon Favreau and Justin Marks were in talks to return as director and writer, respectively, while Brigham Taylor was reported to be returning as producer. It would potentially have been released sometime in late 2019, and would have been shot back-to-back with Favreau's remake of The Lion King. By March 2017, the sequel was put on hold so that Favreau could focus on The Lion King. In October 2018, Neel Sethi reported that he would reprise his role as Mowgli. Since 2018, the project was stalled.

A live-action remake of The Sword in the Stone reported development in July 2015, with Bryan Cogman writing the script and Brigham Taylor serving as producer. In January 2018, Juan Carlos Fresnadillo was announced as director. The next month, it was reported that the film would premiere exclusively on Disney+. Enrique Chediak joined to serve as the cinematographer in September, while Eugenio Caballero joined to serve as the production designer in December. However, in March 2024, Fresnadillo revealed that the project was scrapped.

In March 2016, Disney re-acquired the film rights to The Chronicles of Prydain, on which the animated film The Black Cauldron was based, with the intention to adapt the novel series into a live-action film series. The project was in early development at Disney with no director, producer, or screenwriter attached yet. Since then, there has been no news about the project.

In March 2016, Disney reported a new film in development titled Rose Red, the live-action spin-off to Snow White and the Seven Dwarfs, which was to be told from the perspective of Snow White's sister, Rose Red. The film was reported to be produced by Vinson and pitched by Justin Merz, based on the script by Evan Daugherty. An additional live-action movie based on Prince Charming (of Cinderella and other fairy tales), entitled Charming, entered development in November 2017 with Stephen Chbosky as writer and director. Since then, there have been no updates about the projects.

In May 2019, Alan Menken reported that Pocahontas would never have a live-action remake in the future, since remaking Pocahontas would most likely be impossible due to modern sensibilities. In May 2023, Menken reported that a live-action remake of The Hunchback of Notre Dame simply titled Hunchback, which was announced in January 2019 to be written by David Henry Hwang, produced by Josh Gad, David Hoberman, and Todd Lieberman (through Mandeville Films), and based on elements from both the animated film and Victor Hugo's novel, was stalled for similar reasons.

In January 2020, a photorealistic computer-animated remake of Bambi was announced to be in development with a script co-written by Geneva Robertson-Dworet and Lindsey Anderson Beer. Paul Weitz, Chris Weitz, and Andrew Miano would produce the film; a joint-venture production between Disney, Depth of Field Studios, and Known Universe Productions. In June 2023, it was revealed that Sarah Polley was in talks to direct the film, which was said to be a musical that would feature music from six-time Grammy-winning country star Kacey Musgraves. Micah Fitzerman-Blue and Noah Harpster had written the most recent draft of the script. However, in March 2024, Polley was no longer attached as director, with the project being stalled.

A photorealistic computer animated remake of Robin Hood reported development in April 2020, with Kari Granlund writing the screenplay, Justin Springer producing, and Carlos López Estrada as the director. In March 2026, Estrada confirmed that Disney scrapped the project.

In April 2020, it was reported that a live-action remake of Hercules was under development at Walt Disney Pictures, with the producers of the CGI remake of The Lion King (Jeffrey Silver and Karen Gilchrist) set to produce the film. Joe and Anthony Russo were to serve as producers on the film through their AGBO banner, with Dave Callaham as screenwriter. In June 2022, it was announced that Guy Ritchie, who had previously directed Disney's live-action Aladdin remake, had signed on to direct the film. Joe Russo said that the remake would pay homage to the original with a more modern spin on it and revealed that it would also be a modern musical inspired by TikTok. There have been no updates since then.

In June 2021, Disney reported that a sequel to Cruella was in development, with Craig Gillespie and Tony McNamara reported to return as director and writer, respectively. In August 2021, Emma Stone closed a deal to reprise her role in the sequel, but there have been no updates since then.

In January 2022, it was reported that a live-action remake of The Aristocats was in development with Will Gluck producing under his Olive Bridge Entertainment banner and Keith Bunin writing the script with Gluck. Questlove was attached to direct the film in March 2023. In August 2025, Questlove revealed that Disney was no longer moving forward with the film.

== Reception ==
=== Box office performance ===
Many Disney remakes rank along the highest-grossing films upon their release, currently, The Lion King (11th), Beauty and the Beast (25th), Aladdin (46th), and Lilo & Stitch (57th) are on the list. The Lion King is also the highest-grossing musical film of all time. (Note: Disney, which produced The Lion King (2019), considered the film to be live-action despite most of the film (aside from its opening shot) being made with photorealistic computer animation. Others, such as the Hollywood Foreign Press Association (presenter of the Golden Globe Awards), deemed it to be animated based on specified criteria.) It also set the record for the largest opening for an animated film and the musical before The Super Mario Bros. Movie and Frozen II surpassed the records respectively.

Film	U.S. release date	Box office gross			All-time ranking		Budget	Ref.
Film	U.S. release date	U.S. and Canada	Other territories	Worldwide	U.S. and Canada	Worldwide	Budget	Ref.
The Jungle Book	December 25, 1994	$43,229,904	$9,159,498	$52,389,402	1,950	3,098	$30 million	
101 Dalmatians	November 27, 1996	$136,189,294	$184,500,000	$320,689,294	428	422	$75 million	
102 Dalmatians	November 22, 2000	$66,957,026	$116,654,745	$183,611,771	1,186	898	$85 million	
Alice in Wonderland	March 5, 2010	$334,191,110	$691,276,000	$1,025,467,110	65	44	$200 million	
The Sorcerer's Apprentice	July 16, 2010	$63,150,991	$152,132,751	$215,283,742	1,397	783	$150 million	
Maleficent	May 30, 2014	$241,410,378	$517,129,407	$758,539,785	138	93	$180 million	
Cinderella	March 13, 2015	$201,151,353	$342,363,000	$543,514,353	201	179	$95 million	
The Jungle Book	April 15, 2016	$364,001,123	$602,549,477	$966,550,600	48	43	$175 million	
Alice Through the Looking Glass	May 27, 2016	$77,041,381	$222,415,643	$299,457,024	1,011	470	$170 million	
Beauty and the Beast	March 17, 2017	$504,014,165	$759,506,961	$1,263,521,126	14	16	$160 million	
Christopher Robin	August 3, 2018	$99,215,042	$98,529,335	$197,744,377	746	834	$75 million	
Dumbo	March 29, 2019	$114,766,307	$238,518,314	$353,284,621	592	371	$170 million	
Aladdin	May 24, 2019	$355,559,216	$695,134,737	$1,050,693,953	51	34	$183 million	
The Lion King	July 19, 2019	$543,638,043	$1,113,305,351	$1,656,943,394	11	7	$260 million	
Maleficent: Mistress of Evil	October 18, 2019	$113,929,605	$377,800,484	$491,730,089	608	220	$185 million	
Mulan	September 4, 2020	—N/a (Note: Mulan was released through Disney+ streaming service with a premium fee due to the effects of COVID-19 restrictions. However, it also had a theatrical release in several countries where theaters were open.)	$69,965,374	$69,965,374	—N/a	2,429	$200 million	
Cruella	May 28, 2021	$86,103,234	$139,706,829	$233,510,063	993	702	$100 million	
The Little Mermaid	May 26, 2023	$298,172,056	$271,454,233	$569,626,289	105	199	$240.2 million	
Mufasa: The Lion King	December 20, 2024	$254,567,693	$468,018,667	$722,586,360	150	161	$200 million	
Snow White	March 21, 2025	$87,203,963	$118,341,472	$205,545,435	982	922	$270 million	
Lilo & Stitch	May 23, 2025	$423,778,855	$614,248,671	$1,038,027,526	41	51	$100 million	
Moana	July 10, 2026	$126,077,778	$189,295,308	$315,373,086	611	570	$250 million	
Total		$4,534,348,517	$7,992,006,257	$12,526,354,774	—		$3.553 billion	

=== Critical and public response ===
Film	Rotten Tomatoes	Metacritic	CinemaScore
The Jungle Book (1994)	80%	63	A−
101 Dalmatians	39%	50	A
102 Dalmatians	30%	35	B+
Alice in Wonderland	51%	53	A−
The Sorcerer's Apprentice	40%	46	B−
Maleficent	54%	56	A
Cinderella	84%	67	A
The Jungle Book (2016)	94%	77	A
Alice Through the Looking Glass	29%	34	A−
Beauty and the Beast	71%	65	A
Christopher Robin	73%	60	A
Dumbo	46%	51	A−
Aladdin	57%	53	A
The Lion King	52%	55	A
Maleficent: Mistress of Evil	40%	43	A
Lady and the Tramp	67%	48	—N/a
Mulan	71%	66	—N/a
Cruella	75%	59	A
Pinocchio	27%	38	—N/a
Peter Pan & Wendy	63%	61	—N/a
The Little Mermaid	67%	59	A
Mufasa: The Lion King	56%	56	A−
Snow White	39%	50	B+
Lilo & Stitch	72%	53	A
Moana	31%	42	A−

== Academy Award wins and nominations ==
Film	Ceremony	Category	Recipient	Result	Ref.
102 Dalmatians	73rd Academy Awards	Costume Design	Anthony Powell	Nominated	
Alice in Wonderland	83rd Academy Awards	Art Direction	Robert Stromberg and Karen O'Hara	Won	
Alice in Wonderland	83rd Academy Awards	Costume Design	Colleen Atwood	Won	
Alice in Wonderland	83rd Academy Awards	Visual Effects	Ken Ralston, David Schaub, Carey Villegas, and Sean Phillips	Nominated	
Maleficent	87th Academy Awards	Costume Design	Anna B. Sheppard	Nominated	
Cinderella	88th Academy Awards	Costume Design	Sandy Powell	Nominated	
The Jungle Book	89th Academy Awards	Visual Effects	Robert Legato, Dan Lemmon, Andrew R. Jones, and Adam Valdez	Won	
Beauty and the Beast	90th Academy Awards	Costume Design	Jacqueline Durran	Nominated	
Beauty and the Beast	90th Academy Awards	Production Design	Sarah Greenwood and Katie Spencer	Nominated	
Christopher Robin	91st Academy Awards	Visual Effects	Christopher Lawrence, Michael Eames, Theo Jones, and Chris Corbould	Nominated	
The Lion King	92nd Academy Awards	Visual Effects	Robert Legato, Adam Valdez, Andrew R. Jones, and Elliot Newman	Nominated	
Maleficent: Mistress of Evil	92nd Academy Awards	Makeup and Hairstyling	Paul Gooch, Arjen Tuiten, and David White	Nominated	
Mulan	93rd Academy Awards	Costume Design	Bina Daigeler	Nominated	
Mulan	93rd Academy Awards	Visual Effects	Sean Andrew Faden, Anders Langlands, Seth Maury, and Steve Ingram	Nominated	
Cruella	94th Academy Awards	Costume Design	Jenny Beavan	Won	
Cruella	94th Academy Awards	Makeup and Hairstyling	Nadia Stacey, Naomi Donne, and Julia Vernon	Nominated	

== Returning cast and crew ==
In certain cases, the surviving cast and crew who worked on the original films may return for the remake. Of note, Dwayne Johnson did not only reprise his role as Maui in Moana (2016), but also produced the live-action remake under his production company Seven Bucks Productions. Alan Menken returned to the role of composer and songwriter three times. Disney's live-action remakes form part of the long-running effort to revisit its animated film catalogue for new audiences. In some live-action remakes of Disney's animated films, individuals associated with the original productions have returned to participate in new roles and various capacities. For example, in the 2025 live-action remake of Lilo & Stitch, Chris Sanders, who co-wrote and co-directed the original 2002 animated film and voiced Stitch in that version, returned to voice the character in the remake, and original cast member Tia Carrere, who voiced Nani, appears in a new role. Ming-Na Wen and Jodi Benson, who voiced Mulan and Ariel, respectively, in their original animated films, also have cameos in the respective 2020 and 2023 live-action films. Other live-action remakes have similarly drawn on talent associated with earlier versions of the stories. While not all original cast members have returned, these participations illustrate how some remakes maintain connections with their animated predecessors through returning voices or creative contributions.

Cast/crew	Role in original film	Original film	Remake/Adaptation
Alan Menken; Howard Ashman	Original songs and scores	Aladdin	Aladdin
Alan Menken; Howard Ashman	Original songs and scores	Beauty and the Beast	Beauty and the Beast
Alan Menken; Howard Ashman	Original songs and scores	The Little Mermaid	The Little Mermaid
Frank Welker	Voice actor of Abu, Rajah, and the Cave of Wonders	Aladdin	Aladdin
Jim Cummings	Voice actor of Winnie the Pooh and Tigger	The New Adventures of Winnie the Pooh (Note: Cummings took over as Tigger full-time after The Tigger Movie (2000).)	Christopher Robin
Dwayne Johnson	Voice actor of Maui	Moana	Moana
Jemaine Clement	Voice actor of Tamatoa	Moana	Moana
Mark Mancina; Lin-Manuel Miranda; Opetaia Foaʻi	Original songs and scores	Moana	Moana
James Earl Jones	Voice actor of Mufasa	The Lion King	The Lion King
Hans Zimmer; Elton John; Tim Rice	Original songs and scores	The Lion King	The Lion King
Chris Sanders	Voice actor of Stitch	Lilo & Stitch	Lilo & Stitch

== See also ==
- List of Walt Disney Animation Studios films
- List of Disney theatrical animated feature films
- List of Walt Disney Pictures films
- Walt Disney Pictures
- Walt Disney Studios Home Entertainment
- List of Disney feature-length home entertainment releases
- List of film adaptations of Disney attractions
- Belle's Tales of Friendship
- Geppetto
- The Jungle Book: Mowgli's Story
- Once Upon a Time (TV series)
- Descendants (franchise)
