= 64th British Academy Film Awards =

2011 film award ceremony

- Date: 13 February 2011
- Site: Royal Opera House, London
- Hosted by: Jonathan Ross

Highlights
- Best Film: The King's Speech
- Best British Film: The King's Speech
- Best Actor: Colin Firth; The King's Speech
- Best Actress: Natalie Portman; Black Swan
- Most awards: The King's Speech (7)
- Most nominations: The King's Speech (14)

The 64th British Academy Film Awards, more commonly known as the BAFTAs, were held on 13 February 2011 at the Royal Opera House in London, honouring the best national and foreign films of 2010. Presented by the British Academy of Film and Television Arts, accolades are handed out for the best feature-length film and documentaries of any nationality that were screened at British cinemas in 2010.

The nominations were announced on 18 January 2011. The King's Speech earned the most nominations with fourteen and won seven, including Best Film, Outstanding British Film, Best Actor for Colin Firth, Best Supporting Actor for Geoffrey Rush, Best Supporting Actress for Helena Bonham Carter, and Best Original Screenplay for David Seidler. Natalie Portman won Best Actress for Black Swan and David Fincher won Best Director for The Social Network.

== Winners and nominees ==
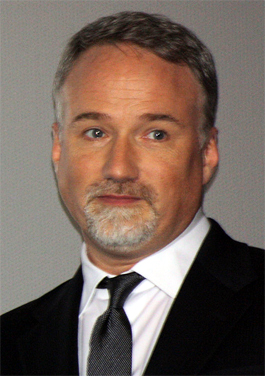
David Fincher, Best Director winner

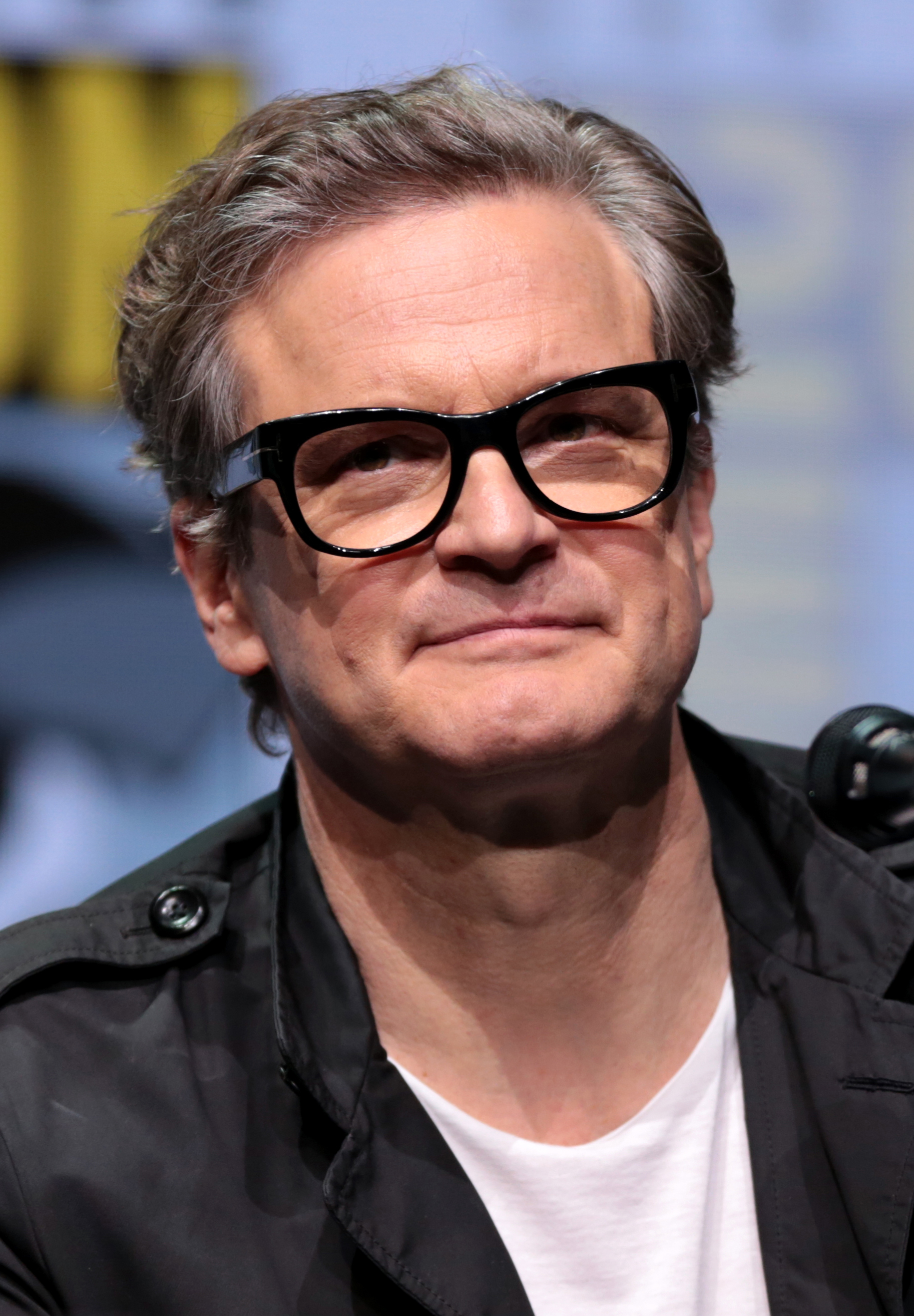
Colin Firth, Best Actor winner

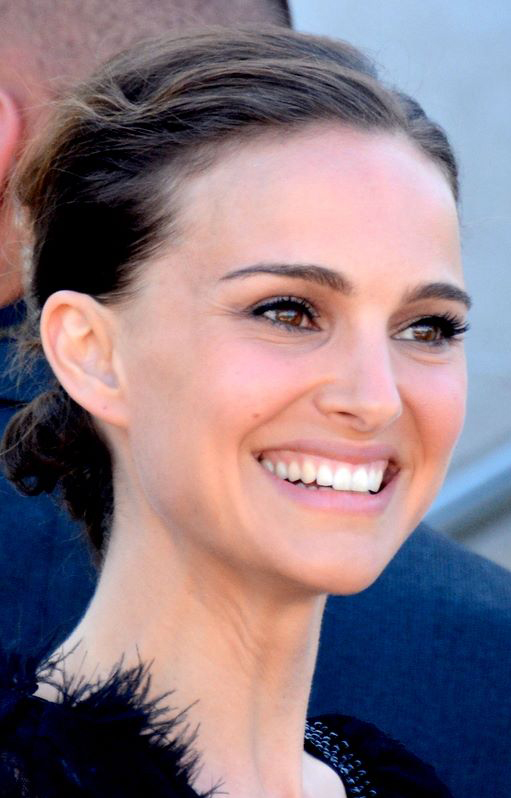
Natalie Portman, Best Actress winner

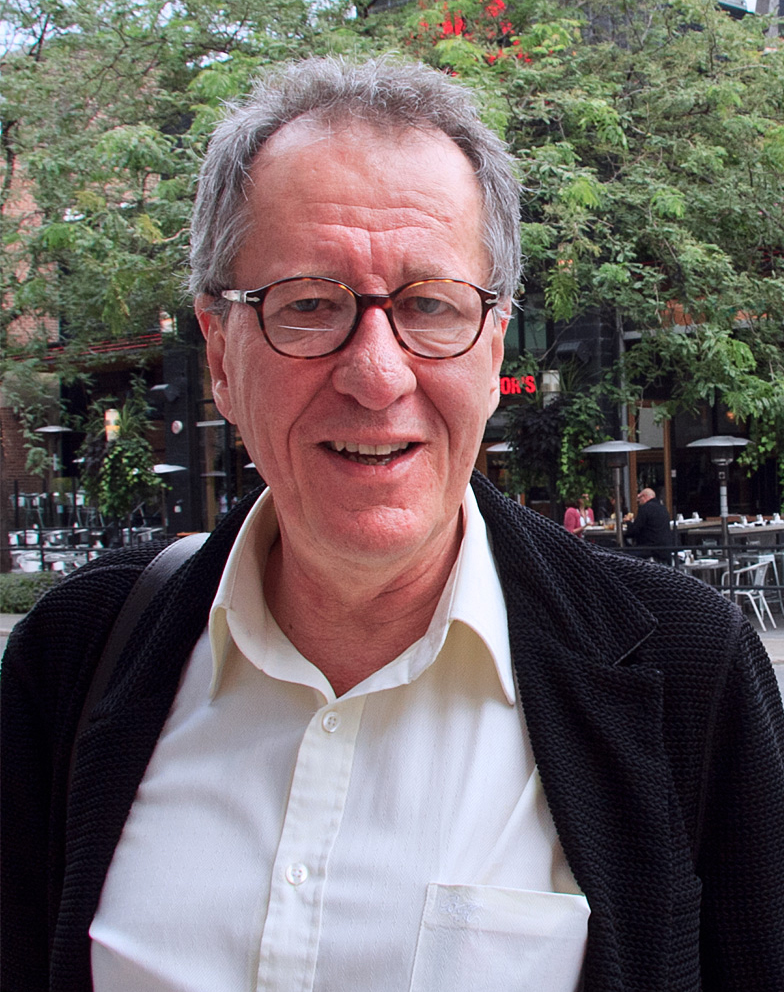
Geoffrey Rush, Best Supporting Actor winner

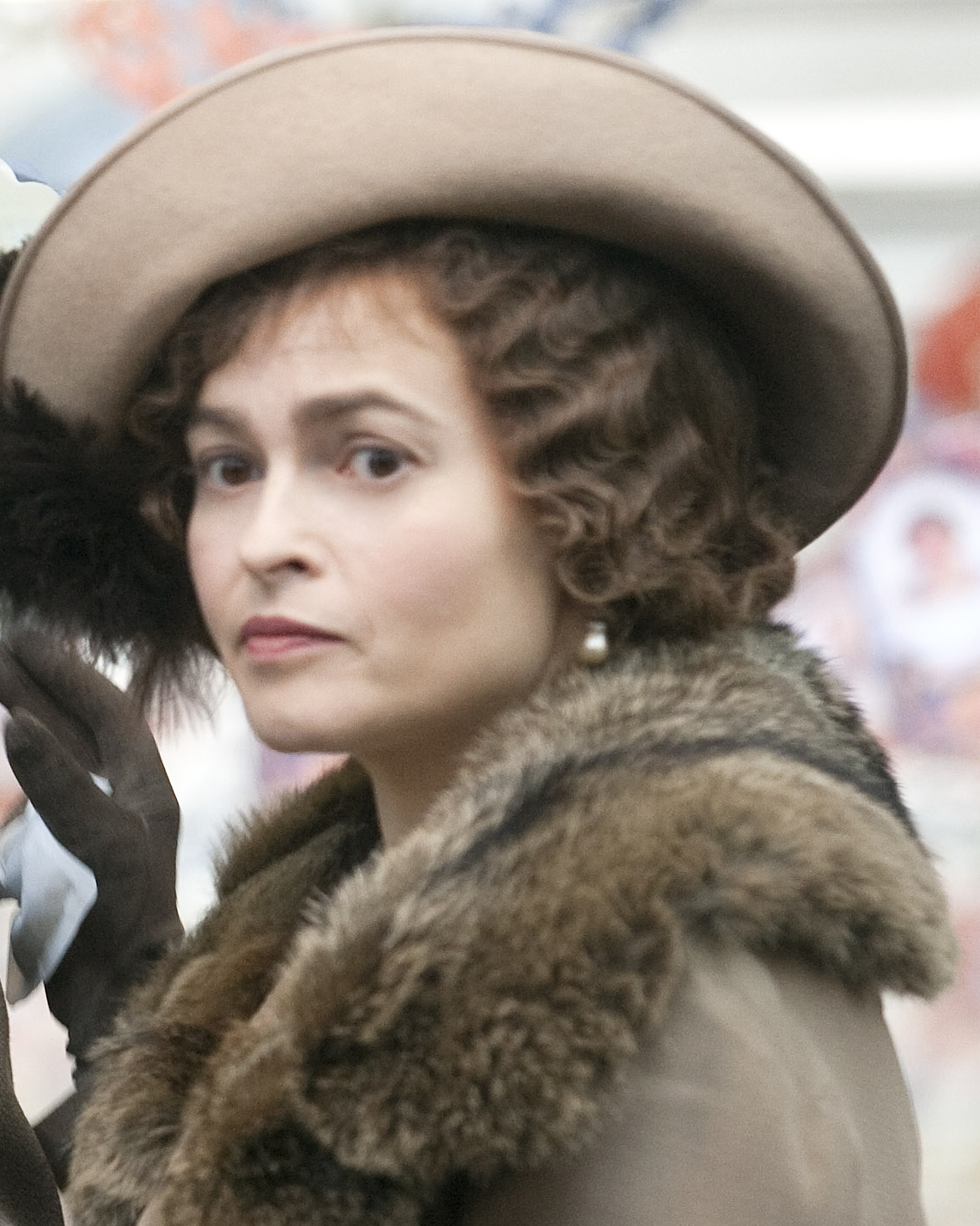
Helena Bonham Carter, Best Supporting Actress winner

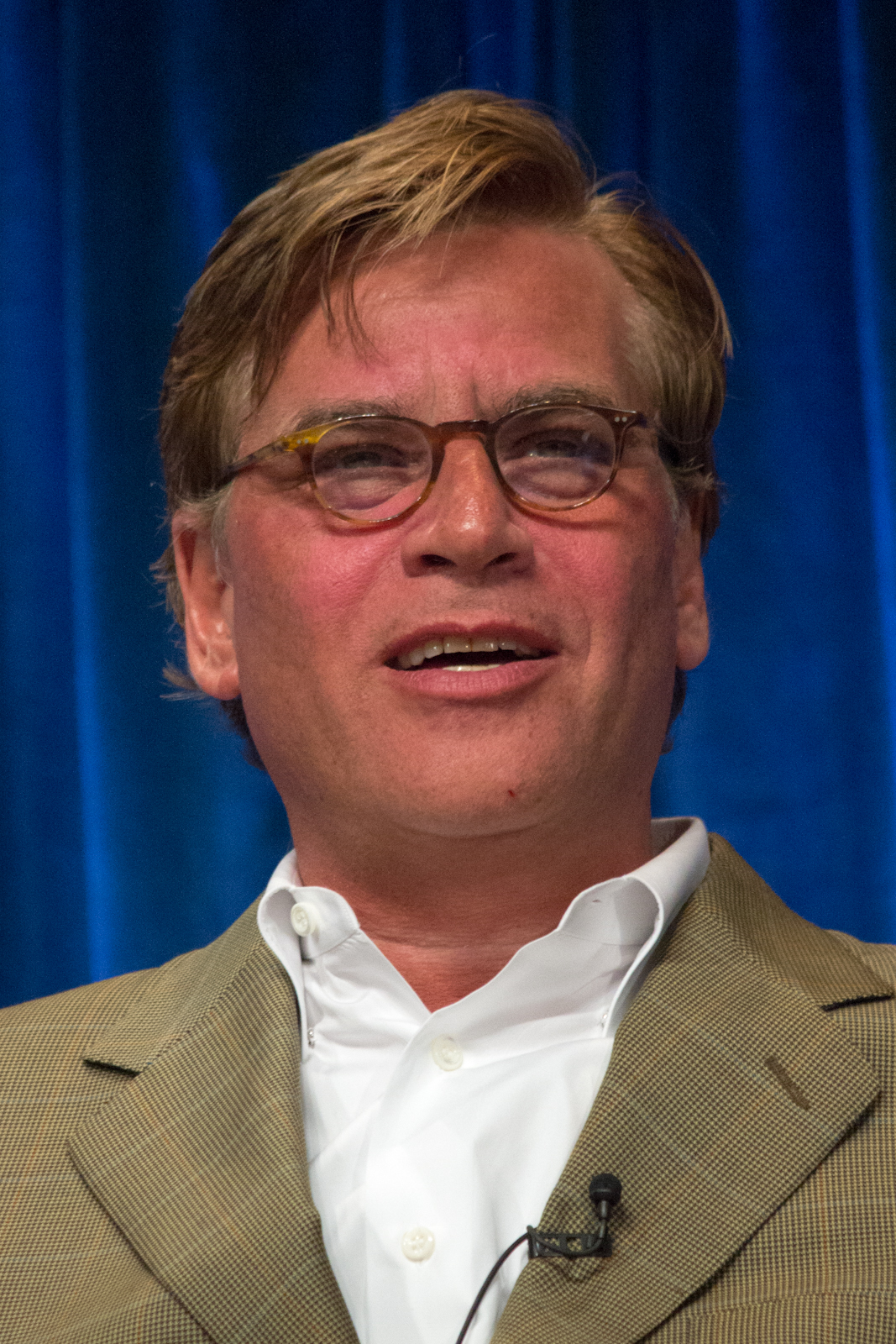
Aaron Sorkin, Best Adapted Screenplay winner

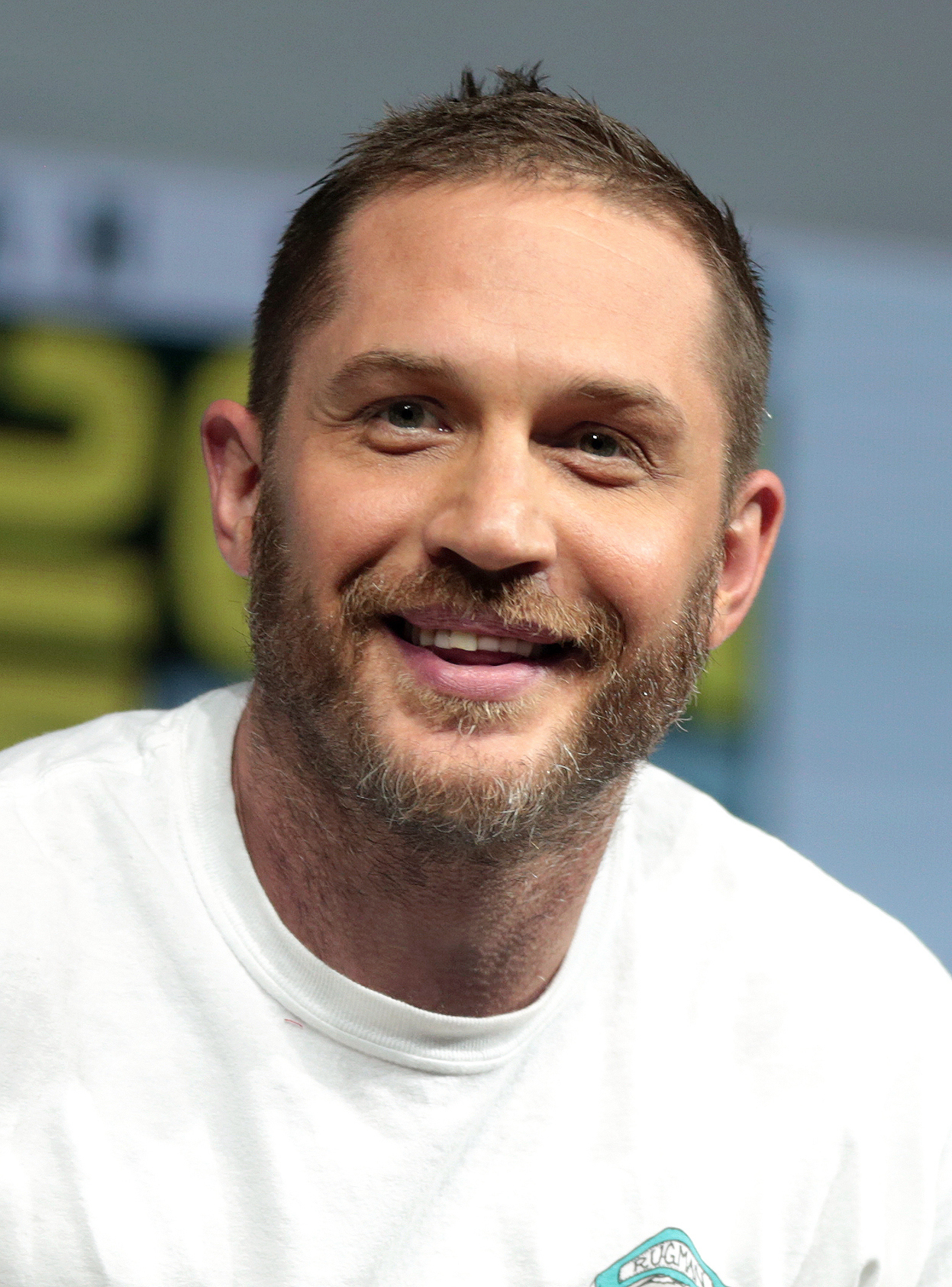
Tom Hardy, EE Orange Rising Star Award winner

=== BAFTA Fellowship ===
- **Sir Christopher Lee**

=== Outstanding British Contribution to Cinema ===
- **Harry Potter film series**

=== Awards ===
Winners are listed first and highlighted in boldface.

**Best Film**: **The King's Speech – Iain Canning, Emile Sherman and Gareth Unwin**; Black Swan – Mike Medavoy, Brian Oliver and Scott Franklin; Inception – Emma Thomas and Christopher Nolan; The Social Network – Scott Rudin, Dana Brunetti, Michael De Luca and Ceán Chaffin; True Grit – Scott Rudin, Ethan Coen and Joel Coen	**Best Direction**: **David Fincher – The Social Network**; Darren Aronofsky – Black Swan; Danny Boyle – 127 Hours; Tom Hooper – The King's Speech; Christopher Nolan – Inception
**Best Actor in a Leading Role**: **Colin Firth – The King's Speech as King George VI**; Javier Bardem – Biutiful as Uxbal; Jeff Bridges – True Grit as Rooster Cogburn; Jesse Eisenberg – The Social Network as Mark Zuckerberg; James Franco – 127 Hours as Aron Ralston	**Best Actress in a Leading Role**: **Natalie Portman – Black Swan as Nina Sayers / The Swan Queen**; Annette Bening – The Kids Are All Right as Dr. Nicole "Nic" Allgood; Julianne Moore – The Kids Are All Right as Jules Allgood; Noomi Rapace – The Girl with the Dragon Tattoo as Lisbeth Salander; Hailee Steinfeld – True Grit as Mattie Ross
**Best Actor in a Supporting Role**: **Geoffrey Rush – The King's Speech as Lionel Logue**; Christian Bale – The Fighter as Dicky Eklund; Andrew Garfield – The Social Network as Eduardo Saverin; Pete Postlethwaite – The Town as Fergus "Fergie" Colm (posthumous); Mark Ruffalo – The Kids Are All Right as Paul Hatfield	**Best Actress in a Supporting Role**: **Helena Bonham Carter – The King's Speech as Queen Elizabeth**; Amy Adams – The Fighter as Charlene Fleming; Barbara Hershey – Black Swan as Erica Sayers / The Queen; Lesley Manville – Another Year as Mary Smith; Miranda Richardson – Made in Dagenham as Barbara Castle
**Best Original Screenplay**: **The King's Speech – David Seidler**; Black Swan – Mark Heyman, Andres Heinz and John McLaughlin; The Fighter – Scott Silver, Paul Tamasy and Eric Johnson; Inception – Christopher Nolan; The Kids Are All Right – Lisa Cholodenko and Stuart Blumberg	**Best Adapted Screenplay**: **The Social Network – Aaron Sorkin**; 127 Hours – Danny Boyle and Simon Beaufoy; The Girl with the Dragon Tattoo – Rasmus Heisterberg and Nikolaj Arcel; Toy Story 3 – Michael Arndt; True Grit – Joel Coen and Ethan Coen
**Best Cinematography**: **True Grit – Roger Deakins**; 127 Hours – Anthony Dod Mantle and Enrique Chediak; Black Swan – Matthew Libatique; Inception – Wally Pfister; The King's Speech – Danny Cohen	**Best Costume Design**: **Alice in Wonderland – Colleen Atwood**; Black Swan – Amy Westcott; The King's Speech – Jenny Beavan; Made in Dagenham – Louise Stjernsward; True Grit – Mary Zophres
**Best Editing**: **The Social Network – Angus Wall and Kirk Baxter**; 127 Hours – Jon Harris; Black Swan – Andrew Weisblum; Inception – Lee Smith; The King's Speech – Tariq Anwar	**Best Makeup and Hair**: **Alice in Wonderland – Valli O'Reilly and Paul Gooch**; Black Swan – Judy Chin and Geordie Sheffer; Harry Potter and the Deathly Hallows – Part 1 – Amanda Knight, Lisa Tomblin and Nick Dudman; The King's Speech – Frances Hannon; Made in Dagenham – Elizabeth Yianni-Georgiou
**Best Original Music**: **The King's Speech – Alexandre Desplat**; 127 Hours – A. R. Rahman; Alice in Wonderland – Danny Elfman; How to Train Your Dragon – John Powell; Inception – Hans Zimmer	**Best Production Design**: **Inception – Guy Hendrix Dyas, Larry Dias and Doug Mowat**; Alice in Wonderland – Robert Stromberg and Karen O'Hara; Black Swan – Thérèse DePrez and Tara Peterson; The King's Speech – Eve Stewart and Judy Farr; True Grit – Jess Gonchor and Nancy Haigh
**Best Sound**: **Inception – Richard King, Lora Hirschberg, Gary Rizzo and Ed Novick**; 127 Hours – Glenn Freemantle, Ian Tapp, Richard Pryke, Steven C. Laneri and Douglas Cameron; Black Swan – Ken Ishii, Craig Henighan and Dominick Tavella; The King's Speech – John Midgley, Lee Walpole, Paul Hamblin and Martin Jensen; True Grit – Skip Lievsay, Craig Berkey, Greg Orloff, Peter Kurland and Douglas Axtell	**Best Special Visual Effects**: **Inception – Chris Corbould, Paul Franklin, Andrew Lockley and Peter Bebb**; Alice in Wonderland – Ken Ralston, David Schaub, Sean Phillips and Carey Villegas; Black Swan – Dan Schrecker, Henrik Fett, Michael Capton and William Kalinoski; Harry Potter and the Deathly Hallows – Part 1 – Tim Burke, John Richardson, Nicolas Aithadi and Christian Manz; Toy Story 3 – Guido Quaroni, Michael Fong and David Ryu
**Outstanding British Film**: **The King's Speech – Tom Hooper, David Seidler, Iain Canning, Emile Sherman and Gareth Unwin**; 127 Hours – Danny Boyle, Simon Beaufoy, Christian Colson and John Smithson; Another Year – Mike Leigh and Georgina Lowe; Four Lions – Chris Morris, Jesse Armstrong, Sam Bain, Mark Herbert and Derrin Schlesinger; Made in Dagenham – Nigel Cole, William Ivory, Elizabeth Karlsen and Stephen Woolley	**Outstanding Debut by a British Writer, Director or Producer**: **Four Lions – Chris Morris**; The Arbor – Clio Barnard and Tracy O'Riordan; Exit Through the Gift Shop – Banksy and Jaimie D'Cruz; Monsters – Gareth Edwards; Skeletons – Nick Whitfield
**Best Short Animation**: **The Eagleman Stag – Michael Please**; Matter Fisher – David Prosser; Thursday – Matthias Hoegg	**Best Short Film**: **Until the River Runs Red – Paul Wright and Poss Kondeatis**; Connect – Samuel Abrahams and Beau Gordon; Lin – Piers Thompson and Simon Hessel; Rite – Michael Pearce, Ross McKenzie and Paul Welsh; Turning – Karni Arieli, Saul Freed, Alison Sterling and Kat Armour-Brown
**Best Animated Film**: **Toy Story 3 – Lee Unkrich**; Despicable Me – Chris Renaud and Pierre Coffin; How to Train Your Dragon – Chris Sanders and Dean DeBlois	**Best Film Not in the English Language**: **The Girl with the Dragon Tattoo – Søren Stærmose and Niels Arden Oplev**; Biutiful – Alejandro González Iñárritu, Jon Kilik and Fernando Bavaira; I Am Love – Luca Guadagnino, Francesco Melzi D'Eril, Marco Morabito and Massimiliano Violante; Of Gods and Men – Xavier Beauvois, Pascal Caucheteux and Étienne Comar; The Secret in Their Eyes – Mariela Besuievsky and Juan José Campanella
**EE Rising Star Award**: **Tom Hardy**; Gemma Arterton; Andrew Garfield; Emma Stone; Aaron Taylor-Johnson

== Statistics ==
Films that received multiple nominations
Nominations	Film
14	The King's Speech
12	Black Swan
9	Inception
8	127 Hours
8	True Grit
6	The Social Network
5	Alice in Wonderland
4	The Kids Are All Right
4	Made in Dagenham
3	The Fighter
3	The Girl with the Dragon Tattoo
3	Toy Story 3
2	Another Year
2	Biutiful
2	Four Lions
2	Harry Potter and the Deathly Hallows – Part 1
2	How to Train Your Dragon

Films that received multiple awards
Awards	Film
7	The King's Speech
3	Inception
3	The Social Network
2	Alice in Wonderland

== In Memoriam ==
- John Barry
- Tony Curtis
- Alan Hume
- Blake Edwards
- Roy Ward Baker
- Arthur Penn
- Dede Allen
- Bernd Eichinger
- Leslie Nielsen
- Maria Schneider
- Clive Donner
- Dennis Hopper
- Sally Menke
- Peter Yates
- Guido Coen
- Ingrid Pitt
- Norman Wisdom
- Tura Satana
- Susannah York
- Carol Marsh
- Ronald Neame
- Dino De Laurentiis
- Patricia Neal
- Corey Haim
- Claude Chabrol
- Pete Postlethwaite

== See also ==
- 83rd Academy Awards
- 36th César Awards
- 16th Critics' Choice Awards
- 63rd Directors Guild of America Awards
- 24th European Film Awards
- 68th Golden Globe Awards
- 31st Golden Raspberry Awards
- 25th Goya Awards
- 26th Independent Spirit Awards
- 16th Lumière Awards
- 1st Magritte Awards
- 22nd Producers Guild of America Awards
- 15th Satellite Awards
- 37th Saturn Awards
- 17th Screen Actors Guild Awards
- 63rd Writers Guild of America Awards
