= Sean Phillips (visual effects artist) =

- Occupation: Visual effects artist
- Years active: 1989–present

Sean Phillips is a special effects artist. He was nominated at the 83rd Academy Awards in the category of Best Visual Effects, for the film Alice in Wonderland, along with Ken Ralston, David Schaub and Carey Villegas.

== Selected filmography ==
- Outbreak (1995)
- Stuart Little 2 (2002)
- Bad Boys II (2003)
- Alice in Wonderland (2010)
