= David Schaub =

- Occupation: CGI Visual effects artist
- Years active: 1996-present

David Schaub is a CGI special effects artist most known for his work on Alice in Wonderland, The Amazing Spider-Man and I am Legend

He was nominated at the 83rd Academy Awards in the category of Best Visual Effects, for the film Alice in Wonderland. His nomination was shared with Sean Phillips, Ken Ralston and Carey Villegas.

== Filmography ==
- The Craft (1996)
- Godzilla (1998)
- Patch Adams (1998)
- The Astronaut's Wife (1999)
- Stuart Little (1999)
- Cast Away (2000)
- Hollow Man (2000)
- Evolution (2001)
- Stuart Little 2 (2002)
- The Polar Express (2004)
- The Chronicles of Narnia: The Lion, the Witch and the Wardrobe (2005)
- I Am Legend (2007)
- Surf's Up (2007)
- Alice in Wonderland (2010)
- The Amazing Spider-Man (2012)
- The Amazing Spider-Man 2 (2014)
- Edge of Tomorrow (2014)
