= Paul Gooch =

American make-up artist

- Occupation: Make-up artist

Paul Gooch is an American make-up artist. He was nominated for an Academy Award in the category Best Makeup and Hairstyling for the film Maleficent: Mistress of Evil.

== Selected filmography ==
- Maleficent: Mistress of Evil (2019; co-nominated with Arjen Tuiten and David White)
