= Carey Villegas =

American visual effects artist

- Born: Carey Grant Villegas
- Other name: Carey G. Villegas
- Occupation: Visual Effects Supervisor
- Years active: 1992–present

Carey Grant Villegas is a visual effects artist who was nominated at the 83rd Academy Awards in the category of Best Visual Effects, for the film Alice in Wonderland. His nomination was shared with Sean Phillips, Ken Ralston and David Schaub. Also for Alice in Wonderland, Carey won the 2010 Golden Satellite Award for Best Visual Effects and was nominated for the British Academy Award (BAFTA), Critics Choice Award, Saturn Award, and the Visual Effects Society Award (VES) for "Outstanding Visual Effects in a Visual Effects Driven Motion Picture".

In 2004, as a Visual Effects Supervisor, Carey was nominated for a Visual Effects Society Award (VES) for "Outstanding Supporting Visual Effects in a Motion Picture" for Bad Boys II. And in 2015, as the Senior Visual Effects Supervisor on Disney's Maleficent, Carey was nominated for another VES Award for "Outstanding Visual Effects in a Visual Effects Driven Motion Picture". He was also nominated for a 2014 Hollywood Post Alliance Award (HPA) for "Outstanding Visual Effects in a Feature Film".

Carey is a member of the Academy of Motion Picture Arts & Sciences (AMPAS), the British Academy of Film and Television Arts (BAFTA), the Visual Effects Society (VES), the International Animated Film Society, and the Society of Motion Picture and Television Engineers (SMPTE).

== Selected filmography ==
- Sgt. Bilko (1996)
- Chain Reaction (1996)
- Michael Collins (1996)
- Titanic (1997)
- Dante's Peak (1997)
- The Fifth Element (1997)
- Armageddon (1998)
- What Dreams May Come (1998)
- Fight Club (1999)
- Supernova (2000)
- Rules of Engagement (2000)
- What Lies Beneath (2000)
- Cast Away (2000)
- America's Sweethearts (2001)
- I Spy (2002)
- Hollywood Homicide (2003)
- Bad Boys II (2003)
- The Forgotten (2004)
- Bewitched (2005)
- Superman Returns (2006)
- Spider-Man 3 (2007)
- The Jane Austen Book Club (2007)
- I Am Legend (2007)
- Eagle Eye (2008)
- Hancock (2008)
- Crazy on the Outside (2010)
- Alice in Wonderland (2010)
- Maleficent (2014)
