= Alice in Wonderland (2010 film) =

2010 film by Tim Burton

- Theatrical release poster
- Directed by: Tim Burton
- Screenplay by: Linda Woolverton
- Based on: Alice's Adventures in Wonderland and Through the Looking-Glass by Lewis Carroll
- Produced by: Richard D. Zanuck; Joe Roth; Suzanne Todd; Jennifer Todd
- Starring: Johnny Depp; Anne Hathaway; Helena Bonham Carter; Crispin Glover; Matt Lucas; Mia Wasikowska; Alan Rickman; Stephen Fry; Michael Sheen; Timothy Spall
- Cinematography: Dariusz Wolski
- Edited by: Chris Lebenzon
- Music by: Danny Elfman
- Production companies: Walt Disney Pictures; Roth Films; The Zanuck Company; Team Todd
- Distributed by: Walt Disney Studios Motion Pictures
- Release dates: February 25, 2010 (Odeon Leicester Square); March 5, 2010 (United States)
- Running time: 108 minutes
- Country: United States
- Language: English
- Budget: $150–$200 million
- Box office: $1.025 billion

Alice in Wonderland is a 2010 American Gothic dark fantasy adventure film directed by Tim Burton from a screenplay written by Linda Woolverton and produced by Walt Disney Pictures. The film stars Mia Wasikowska in the live-action role, Johnny Depp, Anne Hathaway, Matt Lucas, Helena Bonham Carter, and Crispin Glover, and features the voices of Alan Rickman, Stephen Fry, Michael Sheen, Timothy Spall, Christopher Lee, Paul Whitehouse, Barbara Windsor, and Michael Gough. A live-action adaptation and remake of Lewis Carroll's works, the film follows Alice Kingsleigh, a nineteen-year-old who falls down a rabbit hole by going back to Wonderland, and alongside the Mad Hatter helps restore the White Queen to her throne by fighting against the Red Queen and the Jabberwock, a dragon who endangers Wonderland's residents.

Alice in Wonderland began development in December 2007, when Burton was asked to direct two 3D films for Disney, including the remake of Frankenweenie. Production began in September 2008 concluding within three months, and was shot in the United Kingdom and the United States. It was followed by an extensive post-production and visual effects process where filming included live-action and motion-capture sequences. Burton's frequent collaborator, Danny Elfman, composed an original theme for the film, which premiered in London at the Odeon Leicester Square on February 25, 2010. It was released in the United Kingdom and the United States through the Disney Digital 3-D, RealD 3D, and IMAX 3D formats as well as in standard theaters on March 5.

The film generated over $1.025 billion in ticket sales and became the fifth highest-grossing film during its theatrical run, and it is also the second-highest-grossing film of 2010. Amongst Disney's live-action adaptations, the film is tied for third-most-expensive, alongside Mulan and the fourth-highest-grossing readaptation to date. The film was met with mixed reviews from critics. It received three nominations at the 68th Golden Globe Awards including for Best Motion Picture – Musical or Comedy. At the 83rd Academy Awards, it won Best Art Direction and Best Costume Design, and was nominated for Best Visual Effects. The film received numerous other accolades.

While not the first film in its genre, Alice in Wonderland is credited with starting a trend of live-action fairy tale and fantasy films being green-lit, particularly from Walt Disney Studios. A follow-up film, titled Alice Through the Looking Glass, was released on May 27, 2016.

== Plot ==
In 1871 London, 19-year-old Alice Kingsleigh, having mourned the recent loss of her father, is troubled by strange recurring dreams and the stifling expectations of the society in which she lives. After receiving an unwanted marriage proposal from Hamish Ascot at his father's British garden party, Alice spots a familiar white rabbit wearing a waistcoat and carrying a pocket watch. She follows it to a rabbit hole and falls in. She shrinks after drinking from a bottle labeled 'Drink Me' (called a Pishsalver), meaning she cannot reach a key on a table, and then eats a cake labeled 'Eat Me' (called an Upelkuchen), transforming into a giantess. After drinking from the bottle again to fit through a tiny door, she enters the forest of a fantastical world called Underland. There, she is greeted by the White Rabbit, a Dormouse, a Dodo, Talking Flowers, and identical twins Tweedledum and Tweedledee, who all apparently know her.

Alice asserts that she is dreaming, but learns from Absolem the Caterpillar that she is destined to slay the Jabberwocky and end the tyranny of the Red Queen. The group is ambushed by the ravenous Bandersnatch and the Red Queen's knights, led by the Knave of Hearts. All are captured except Alice, who escapes, and the Dormouse, who takes one of the Bandersnatch's eyes. The Knave informs the Red Queen of Alice's return, and is ordered to find her immediately.

The Cheshire Cat guides Alice to the Mad Hatter, March Hare, and Dormouse's tea party. The Red Knights and the Knave of Hearts disrupt the party, but Alice manages to hide in a teapot. The Hatter then takes her to a safe place. He explains that the Red Queen took over Underland, usurping her sister, the White Queen. While in the woods, the Red Knights find the two, but the Hatter gives himself up so that Alice can escape. She is found by the Knave's Bloodhound, named Bayard, who is allied with the resistance. He takes Alice to the Red Queen's castle, where she becomes a giantess again after eating another Upelkuchen.

Infiltrating the palace as a courtier named "Um", Alice learns that the vorpal sword, the only weapon capable of killing the Jabberwocky, is locked inside the Bandersnatch's den. The Knave makes a pass at Alice, which she rebuffs, but the jealous Red Queen orders her beheading. Alice obtains the sword and returns the Bandersnatch's eye. He gratefully helps her escape the castle and delivers her to the White Queen, who gives Alice a potion that returns her to her normal size. The Cheshire Cat uses his shapeshifting powers to free the Mad Hatter, who incites rebellion amongst the Red Queen's subjects. Meanwhile, Absolem, who is turning into a pupa, finally gets Alice to remember that she visited Underland when she was a little girl, and called it "Wonderland". Just before his chrysalis closes, he advises her to fight the Jabberwocky, save Underland, and stop the Red Queen for good.

The Queens gather their armies on a chessboard-like battlefield and send Alice and the Jabberwocky to decide the battle in single combat. The battle ends when Alice beheads the Jabberwocky with the vorpal sword, and the red knights gratefully turn against their ruler. The White Queen banishes her sister and the Knave into exile together, then gives Alice a vial of the Jabberwocky's purple blood, which can fulfill one wish. Alice says farewell to her friends, then wishes to return home.

Alice awakens in the rabbit hole. When she returns to the gazebo at the garden party, she rejects Hamish's proposal and impresses Lord Ascot with her idea of establishing trade routes to Hong Kong, her father's original idea, which inspires him to take her on as his apprentice. As Alice prepares to set off on a trading ship, Absolem, in his new butterfly form, lands on her shoulder.

== Cast ==
- Johnny Depp as Tarrant Hightopp / Mad Hatter: Wasikowska said that the characters "both feel like outsiders and feel alone in their separate worlds, and have a special bond and friendship." Burton explained that Depp "tried to find a grounding to the character… as opposed to just being mad." Burton also said that "[i]n a lot of versions it's a very one-note kind of character and you know [Depp's] goal was to try and bring out a human side to the strangeness of the character." The orange hair is an allusion to the mercury poisoning suffered by hatters who used mercury to cure felt; Depp believes that the character "was poisoned … and it was coming out through his hair, through his fingernails and eyes". Depp and Burton decided that the Hatter's clothes, skin, hair, personality and accent would change throughout the film to reflect his emotions. In an interview with Depp, the character was paralleled to "a mood ring, [as] his emotions are very close to the surface". The Hatter is "made up of different people and their extreme sides", with a gentle voice much like the character's creator Lewis Carroll reflecting the lighter personality and with a Scottish Glaswegian accent (which Depp modeled after Gregor Fisher's Rab C. Nesbitt character) reflecting a darker, more dangerous personality. Illusionary dancer David "Elsewhere" Bernal doubled for Depp during the "Futterwacken" sequence near the end of the film.
- Mia Wasikowska as Alice Kingsleigh: When creating the character, screenwriter Linda Woolverton researched how young women were expected to behave in the Victorian era and then made her the opposite. Wasikowska read Carroll's books as a child and re-read them to prepare for her role. She also watched Jan Švankmajer's Alice. She said, "When we were kids, my mum would pop it in the VCR player. We would be disturbed, and wouldn't really understand it, but we couldn't look away because it was too intriguing. So I had kept that feeling about Alice, a kind of haunting feeling." Although facing pressures to conform to society's expectations, Alice grows into a stronger-willed and empowered heroine who chooses her own path; Independent columnist Liz Hoggard praised Alice as a role model for girls, describing the character as "stubborn, brave, [and] non-girlie". Mairi Ella Challen portrayed Alice as a six-year-old girl.

Helena Bonham Carter as the Red Queen; Bonham Carter's head was digitally increased to three times its original size in the film

- Helena Bonham Carter as Iracebeth / Red Queen: She is an amalgamation of two Carroll characters: the Red Queen and the Queen of Hearts. Her first name is a play on the word irascible because she is easily irritated, obstreperous, impatient, and quick to anger. Bonham Carter's head was digitally increased to three times its original size on-screen. The character hates animals, and chooses to use them as servants and furniture. It is implied that the Red Queen beheaded her former husband, the King. The actress took inspiration from her young daughter Nell, a toddler, saying that, "The Red Queen is just like a toddler, because she's got a big head and she's a tyrant."
- Anne Hathaway as Mirana / White Queen: She was one of few characters that did not require digital manipulation. Hathaway summed up her character with a caption on a magnet of Happy Bunny holding a knife; "Cute but psycho. Things even out." According to Hathaway, "She comes from the same gene pool as the Red Queen. She really likes the dark side, but she's so scared of going too far into it that she's made everything appear very light and happy. But she's living in that place out of fear that she won't be able to control herself." Hathaway described her interpretation of the White Queen as "a punk-rock vegan pacifist", with inspiration drawn from Debbie Harry, Greta Garbo, and the artwork of Dan Flavin. Burton said that the White Queen's appearance was inspired by Nigella Lawson.
- Crispin Glover as Ilosovic Stayne / Knave of Hearts: The Knave of Hearts is arrogant and tricky. While he follows the Red Queen's every order, he is the only one capable of calming her dramatic mood swings. Glover said, "The Red Queen has a fair amount of short-tempered reactions to things that people do, and so [the Knave] has to be quite diplomatic." The Red Queen believes that the Knave of Hearts is her lover, but this proves to be false.
- Matt Lucas as Tweedledum / Tweedledee: Burton commented on the mixture of animation and Lucas, saying that "It's a weird mixture of things which gives his characters the disturbing quality that they so richly deserve." The characters are portrayed through a combination of CGI and live-action, with Lucas's face digitally composited to a full animated body. While performing the character, Lucas had to wear a teardrop-shaped motion capture suit and walk on stilts. To play both characters, Lucas was doubled by Ethan Cohn.
- Frances de la Tour as Imogene: Alice's aunt. She is suffering from severe delusions and is constantly awaiting her fictional fiancé, whom she believes to be a prince.
- Leo Bill as Hamish Ascot: Alice's would-be fiancé.

Marton Csokas makes a cameo appearance as Alice's deceased father in the film's opening scene and Alice's mother is portrayed by Lindsay Duncan. Lord and Lady Ascot are portrayed by Tim Pigott-Smith and Geraldine James. Eleanor Tomlinson and Eleanor Gecks portray the Chattaway sisters, Fiona and Faith, who bear a strong resemblance to Tweedledum and Tweedledee. Jemma Powell appears as Alice's sister Margaret, while Margaret's unfaithful husband Lowell is portrayed by John Hopkins.

=== Voice cast ===
- Michael Sheen as Nivens McTwisp / White Rabbit: Sheen said the character "is such an iconic character that [he] didn't feel like [he] should break the mold too much." Burton said the quality he wanted most in his clock-watching bunny was a twitchiness, also commenting that "[in] any incarnation of the [White Rabbit] through the years, there's that sort of nervousness of a rabbit."
- Alan Rickman as Absolem the Caterpillar: Rickman was originally going to have his face composited onto the animated Caterpillar. He was filmed recording his voice in the studio, but the idea was eventually scrapped. The animators did, however, try to give Absolem's face characteristics similar to Rickman's.
- Stephen Fry as Cheshire Cat: Burton stated that the character had a creepy quality in addition to tapping into his own hatred of cats. The role was intended to be played by Michael Sheen but he changed his role to the White Rabbit due to scheduling conflicts.
- Barbara Windsor as Mallymkun the Dormouse: Burton said that he sought after Windsor for the role because he was a fan of her character in the TV show EastEnders. Her voice sealed the deal for her role as the character.
- Timothy Spall as Bayard Hamar / Bloodhound: Although Bayard does not appear in the book, a similar character named The Puppy is likely the inspiration for the character.
- Paul Whitehouse as Thackery Earwicket / March Hare: Burton stated that because Whitehouse is a great comedic actor, a lot of his lines came from improvisation.
- Michael Gough as Uilleam the Dodo: Burton said that Gough was the first person he thought of for the role of Uilleam because he has "a full life quality to his voice". The character only speaks three lines, that Gough recorded in a day. This would be Gough's final acting role; he died a year after its release, aged 94. Gough had previously portrayed the March Hare in the 1966 TV play of the book.
- Christopher Lee as The Jabberwocky: While it only had two lines, Burton said that he felt Lee to be a good match for the iconic character because he is "an iconic guy". For the character, Lee had originally tried to make his voice "burble" (as described in the poem "Jabberwocky"). However, Burton convinced him to use his actual voice, as he found it more intimidating and aggressive.
- Imelda Staunton as The Talking Flowers: Though many flowers appear around Underland, only one of them speaks and one of them is clearly a caricature of Staunton. Staunton only speaks three lines that are heard very briefly at the beginning of the film.
- Jim Carter as The Executioner: The Executioner only speaks one line and appears extremely briefly, though Carter also voiced several other servants to the Red Queen.

Frank Welker provided additional voices and vocal effects; including roars of the Jabberwocky and Bandersnatch, squawks for the Jubjub bird, and Bayard's barking. Rickman, Windsor, Fry, Gough, Lee, Staunton, and Carter each took only a day to record their dialogue.

== Production ==
=== Development and writing ===
I wrote this at a very dark time in my life. A lot of bad things had happened—death, divorce, moving across the country—so I was kind of down the rabbit hole myself at the time… I got an image of her [Alice] standing at a very crucial moment in her life, looking over and seeing this rabbit leaning against the tree, looking at her, knowing she had to put a pin in this crucial decision and follow this rabbit, because that was her destiny.

— Linda Woolverton on coming up with the idea of Alice in Wonderland

Development on Alice in Wonderland began in 2006, when Joe Roth, Jennifer and Suzanne Todd approached Linda Woolverton for ideas for a large fantasy movie; Woolverton proposed them a concept of grown-up Alice (from Lewis Carroll's 1865 novel Alice's Adventures in Wonderland and its 1871 sequel Through the Looking-Glass) returning to Wonderland, which she had in her head for a while. Roth then pitched the idea to Walt Disney Pictures, which greenlit the project, with Woolverton commissioned to write the script. The first draft, titled Alice, was finished on February 23, 2007, and then it was submitted to Tim Burton, who agreed to helm the project. According to Oren Aviv (then president of production at the Walt Disney Studios), Burton was the only choice as the film's director because of his "unique vision and voice that would really give the project that special look and memorable characters." In April of that year, it was revealed that the film would be a blend of live-action and motion-capture, and by November 2007, Burton was officially on board to direct both Alice in Wonderland and a feature-length remake of his 1984 short film Frankenweenie.

Burton developed the story despite experiencing a "weird" connection to the original book. He explained "the goal is to try to make it an engaging movie where you get some of the psychology and kind of bring a freshness but also keep the classic nature of Alice." On prior versions, Burton said "It was always a girl wandering around from one crazy character to another, and I never really felt any real emotional connection." His goal with the new film is to give the story "some framework of emotional grounding" and "to try and make Alice feel more like a story as opposed to a series of events." Burton focused on the poem "Jabberwocky" as part of his structure, and refers to the described creature by the name of the poem rather than by the name "Jabberwock" used in the poem. Burton also stated that he does not see his version as either a sequel to any existing Alice film nor as a "re-imagining".

=== Casting ===
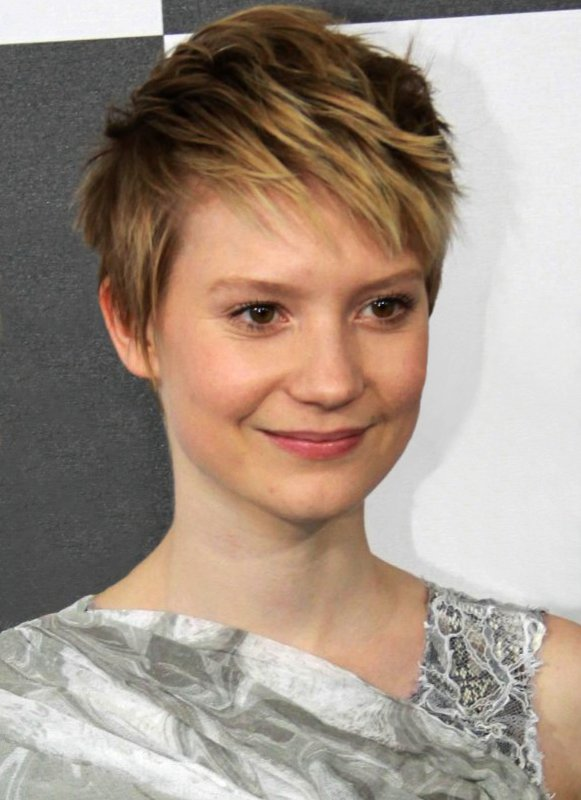
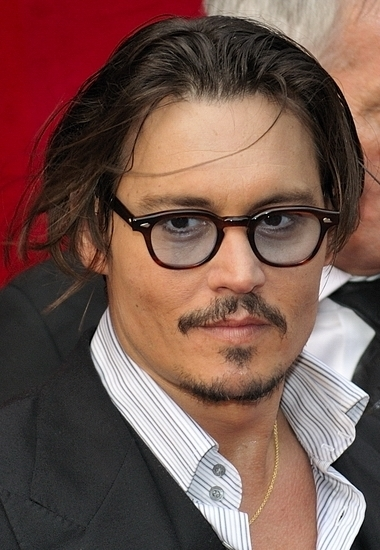
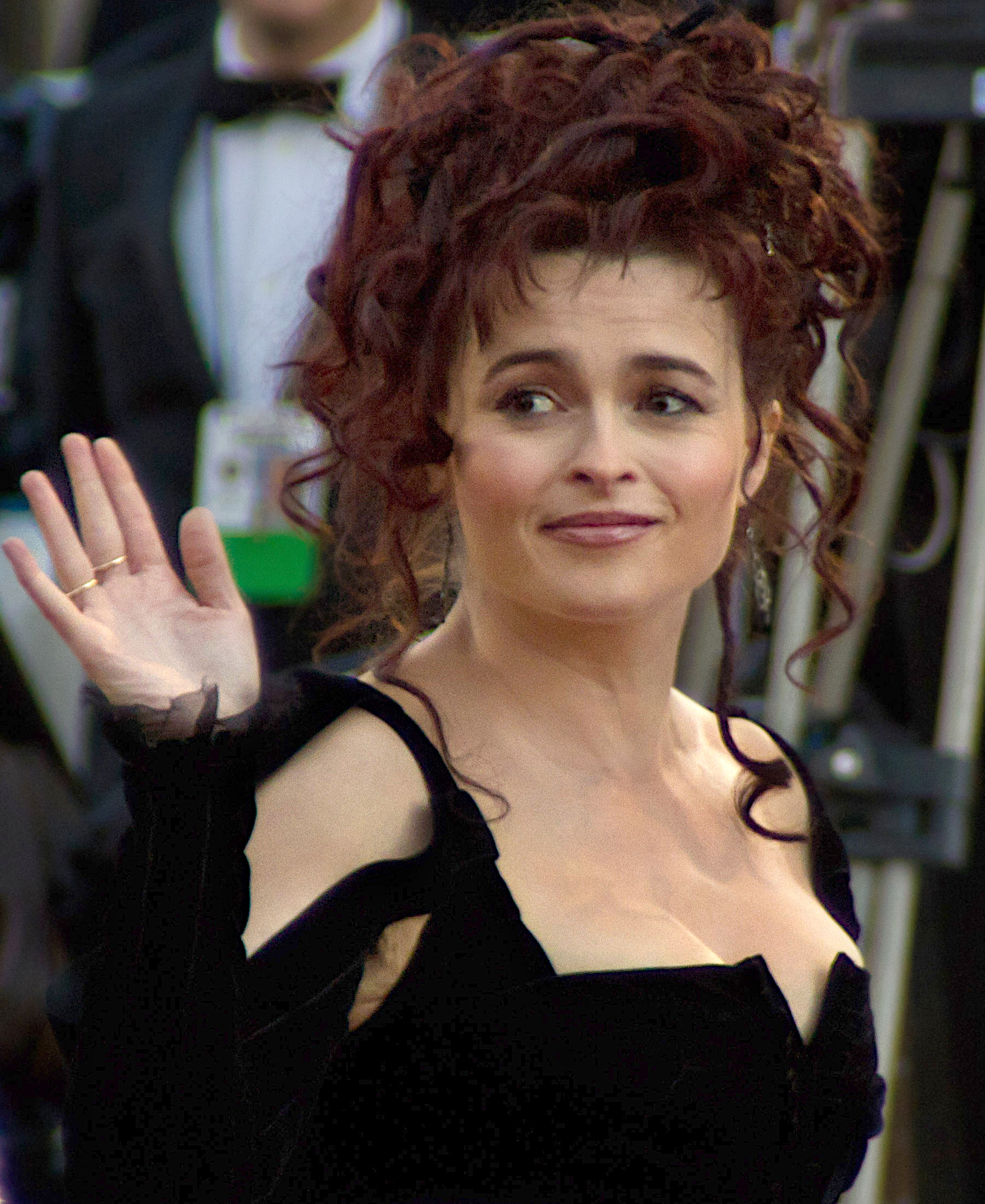
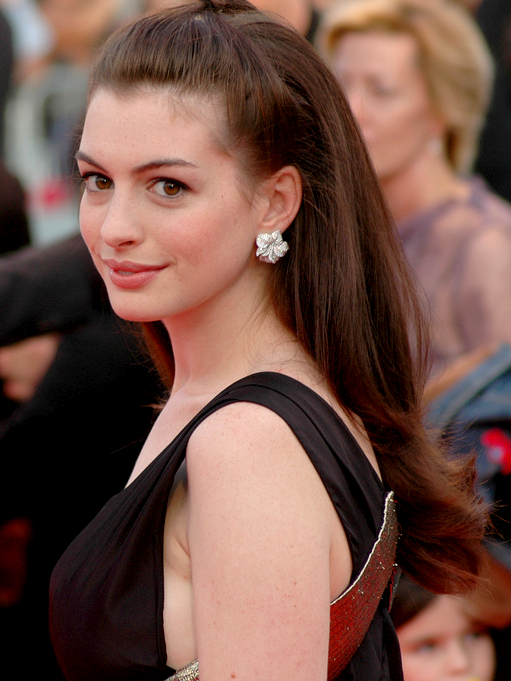
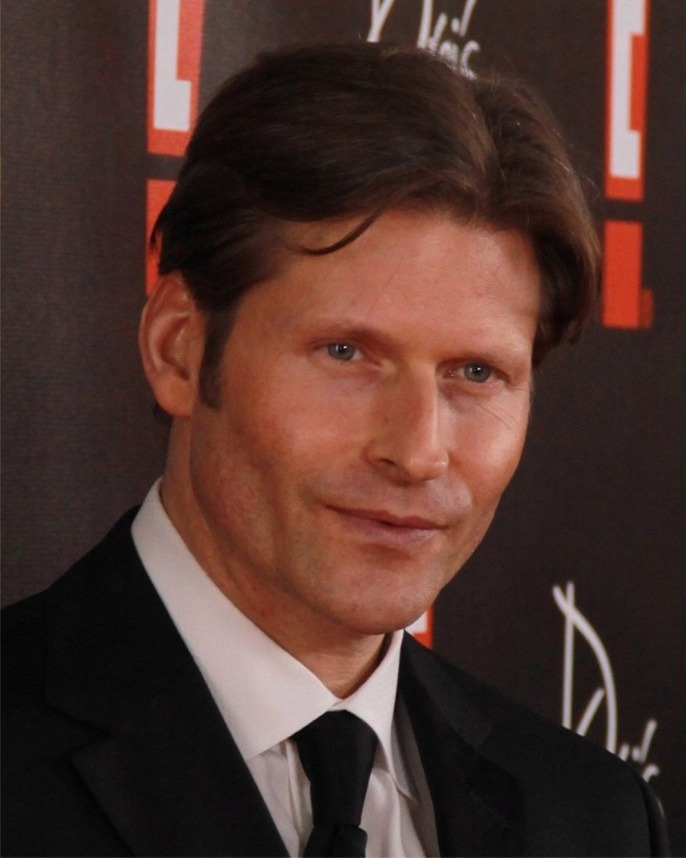
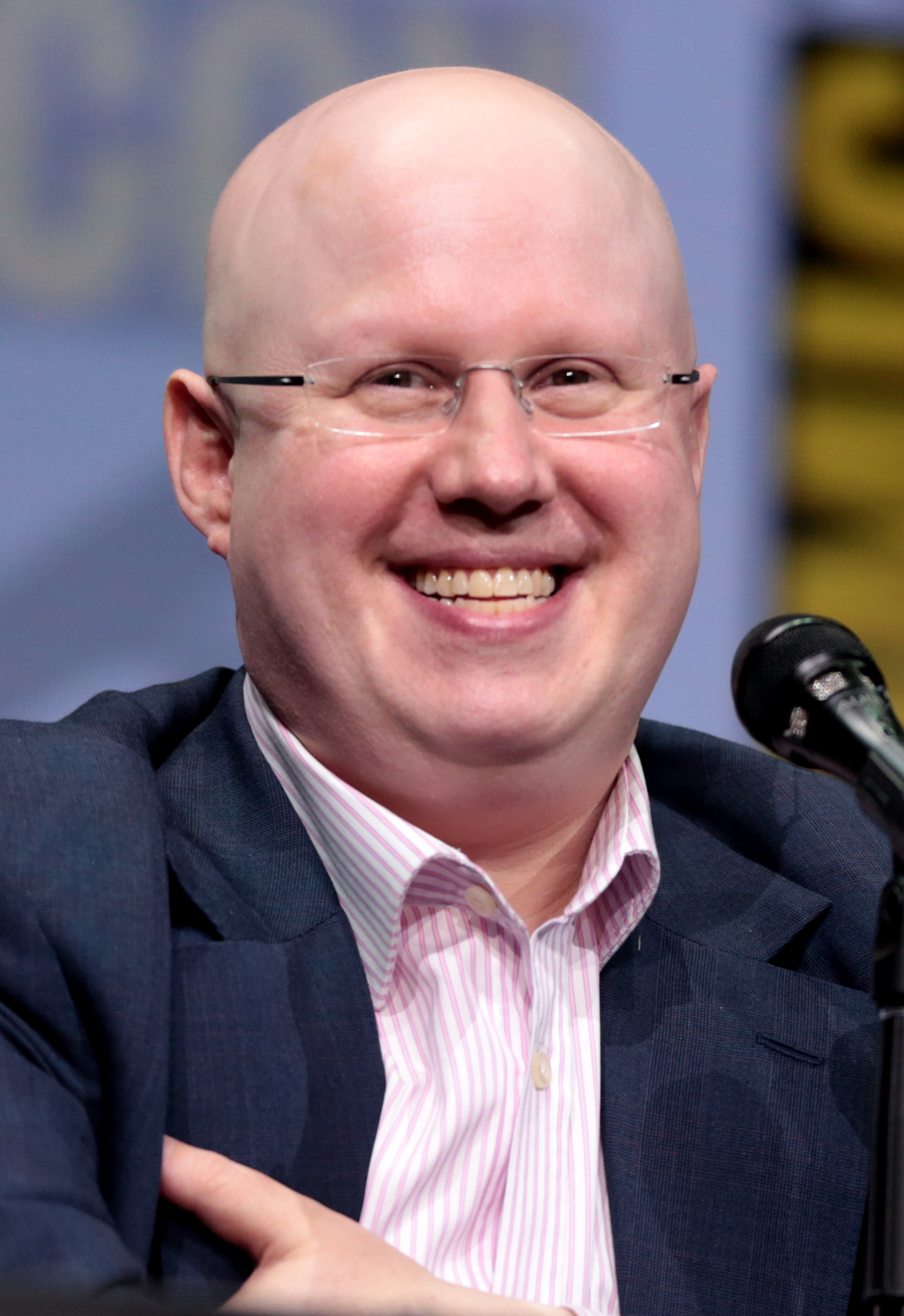
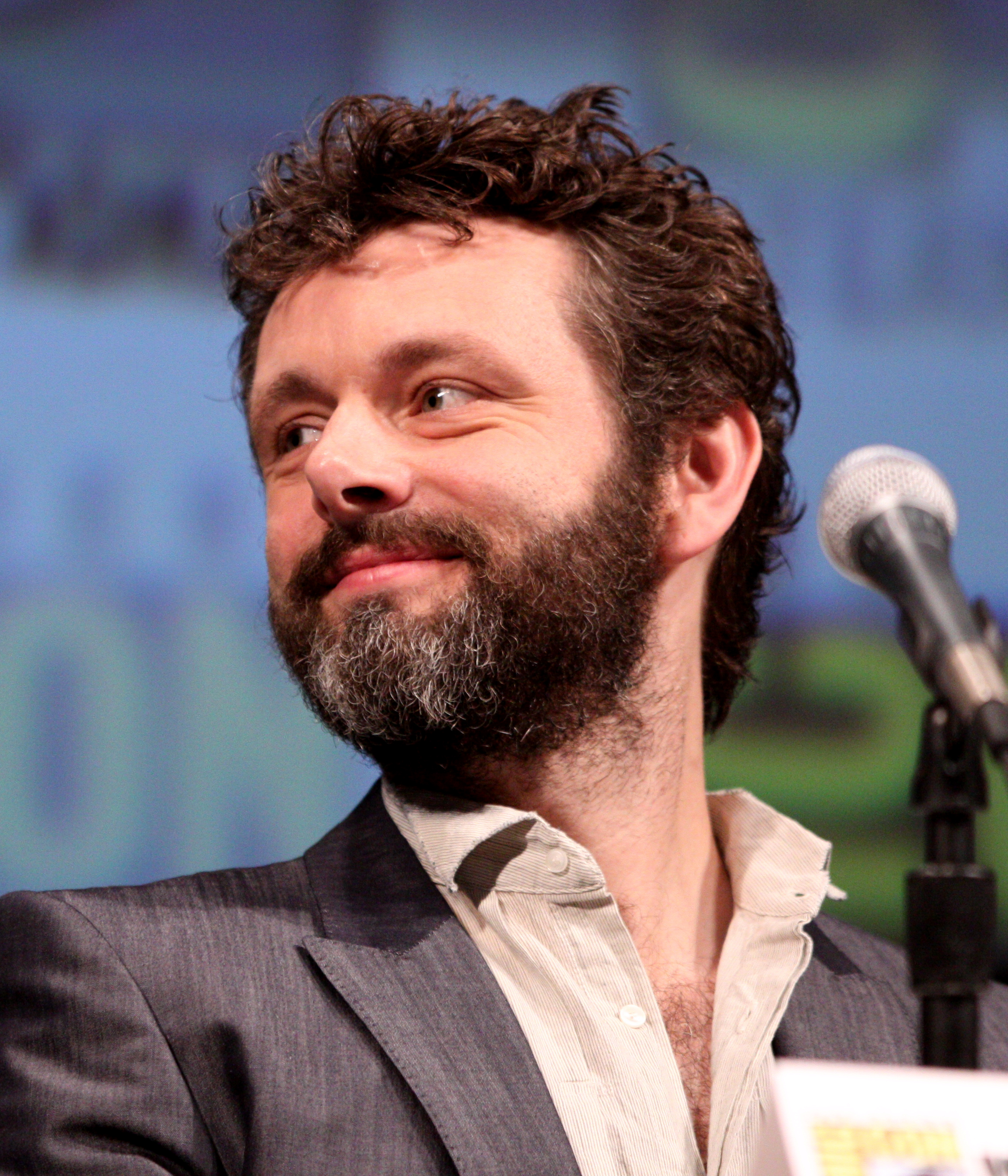
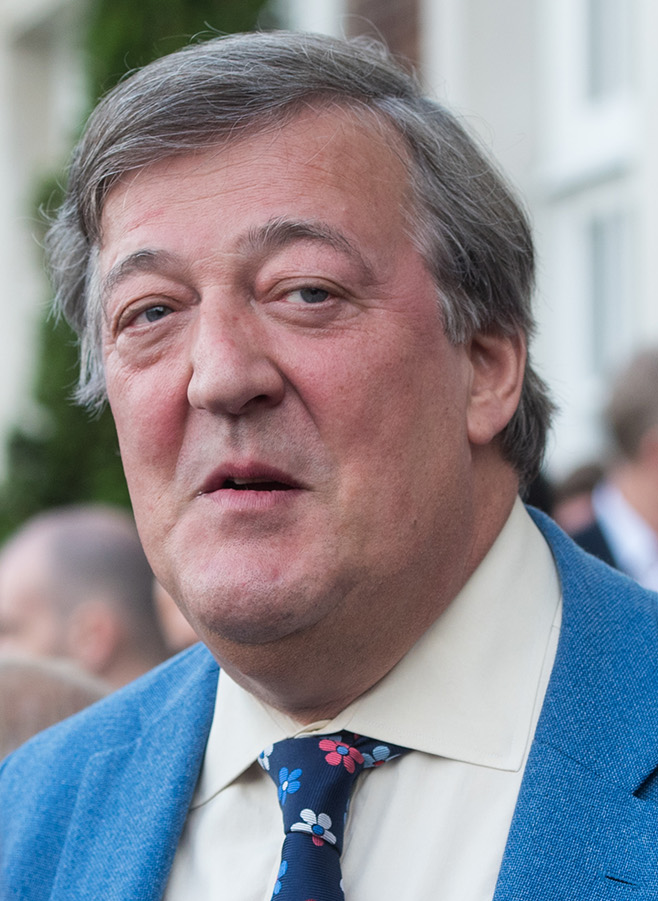
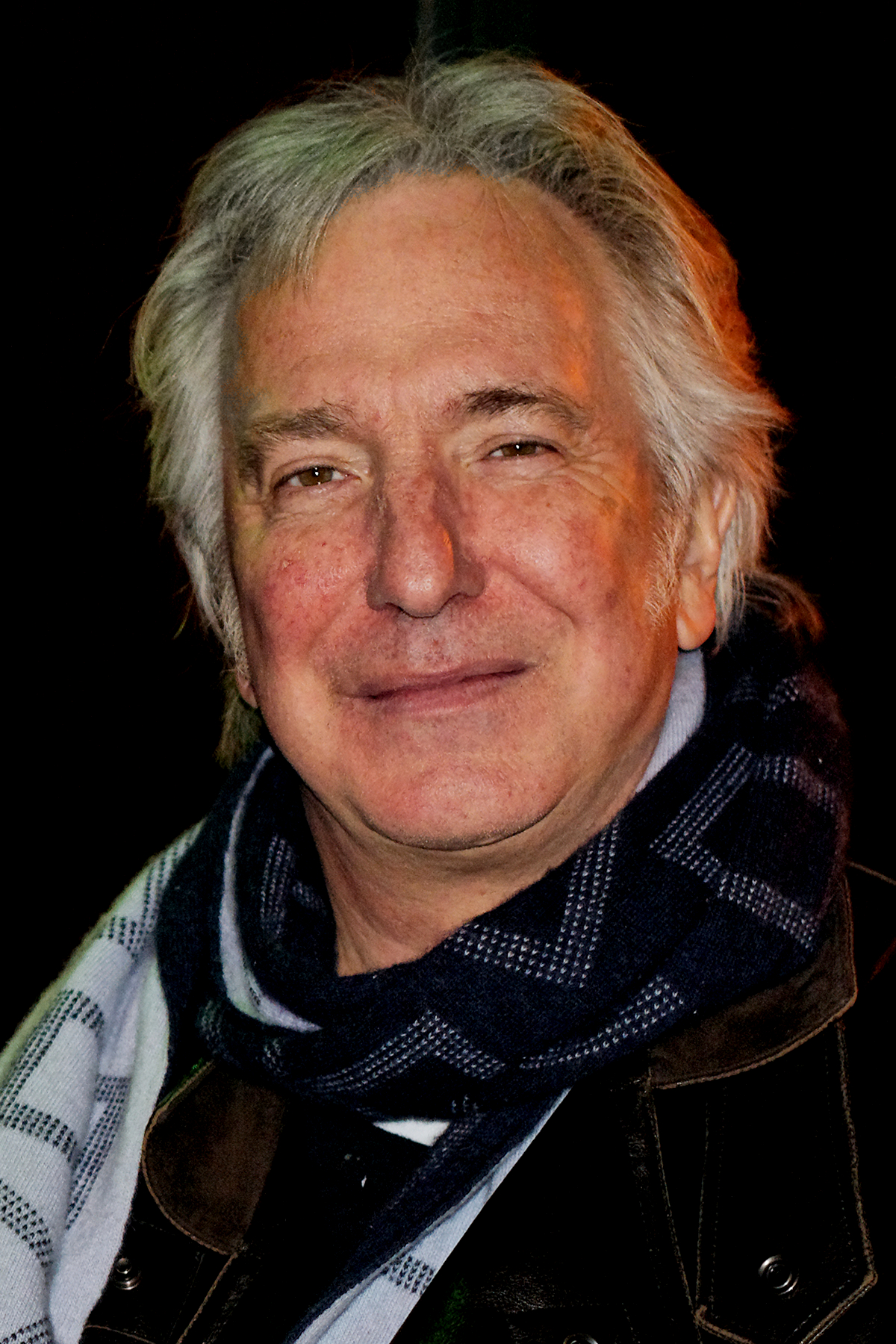
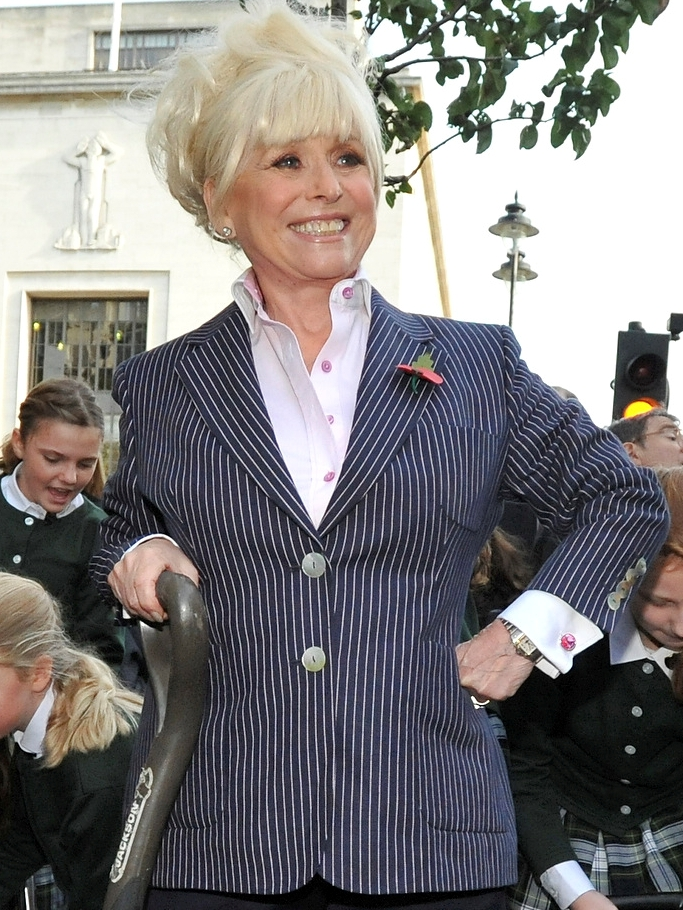
Top row: Mia Wasikowska, Johnny Depp, Helena Bonham Carter, Anne Hathaway, and Crispin Glover portray Alice, the Mad Hatter, the Red Queen, the White Queen, and the Knave of Hearts.
Bottom row: Matt Lucas plays Tweedledee and Tweedledum; Michael Sheen, Stephen Fry, Alan Rickman, and Barbara Windsor voice the White Rabbit, the Cheshire Cat, the Blue Caterpillar, and the Dormouse.

Burton wanted to cast an unknown actress in the role of Alice, which was supported by the Disney studio. According to Burton, he was searching for someone who would have "emotional toughness… standing her ground in a way which makes her kind of an older person but with a younger person’s mentality." He originally planned to offer the role to Frances Bean Cobain, but she turned it down because she wanted to focus on her college studies. In February 2008, Lindsay Lohan expressed interest in playing Alice. Actresses such as Jennifer Lawrence, Cara Delevingne, and Jessica Brown Findlay would later reveal that they also auditioned for the title role, with Brown Findlay being down to the last three. Dakota Blue Richards planned to audition as well, but she was much younger than required for the role. Mia Wasikowska was eventually cast as Alice in July 2008. She sent an audition tape in February of the same year and ended up coming over to the United Kingdom and doing four more auditions with Burton before she was chosen. Burton said that he picked Wasikowska because of "a simple kind of power to her that he really liked. Not flamboyant, not very showy, but just somebody that's got a lot of internal life to her."

A few days after the announcement of Wasikowska's casting, Johnny Depp was reported to be signing up for the role of the Mad Hatter. His casting was officially confirmed in September 2008, marking Alice in Wonderland as Depp's seventh collaboration with Burton since Edward Scissorhands (1990). Later that month, during his appearance on BBC's Friday Night with Jonathan Ross, Matt Lucas announced that he had joined the film as Tweedledee and Tweedledum, and a few days later, Variety reported that Michael Sheen had been cast in an undisclosed role, which was later revealed to be the White Rabbit. Tim Pigott-Smith, Geraldine James, and Frances de la Tour were also confirmed to appear in the film in then-unnamed roles.

By October 2008, Helena Bonham Carter and Anne Hathaway were cast as the Red and White Queens, respectively. Like Depp, Bonham Carter had been Burton's frequent collaborator and had worked on five of his films. She was also Burton's first choice for the Red Queen, with his early sketches of the character made specifically with Bonham Carter in mind. Bonham Carter, who was then Burton's domestic partner, recalled that after he formally asked her to come to a meeting at his office, she thought Burton was going to propose marriage to her until he showed one of his character sketches and offered her the role. Before Burton was attached to the project, Hathaway, who had starred in The Princess Diaries (2001), was approached by Disney to portray Alice, but she refused as she was more interested in playing the White Queen. After Burton came on board, he considered another actress for the role, but she was unavailable due to scheduling conflicts and the studio suggested Hathaway instead. Later that month, Crispin Glover was set to portray the Knave of Hearts, with Alan Rickman and Eleanor Tomlinson announced to play the Blue Caterpillar and Fiona Chattaway, respectively, while Christopher Lee was cast in undisclosed role, which was later revealed to be the Jabberwocky.

=== Filming and visual effects ===
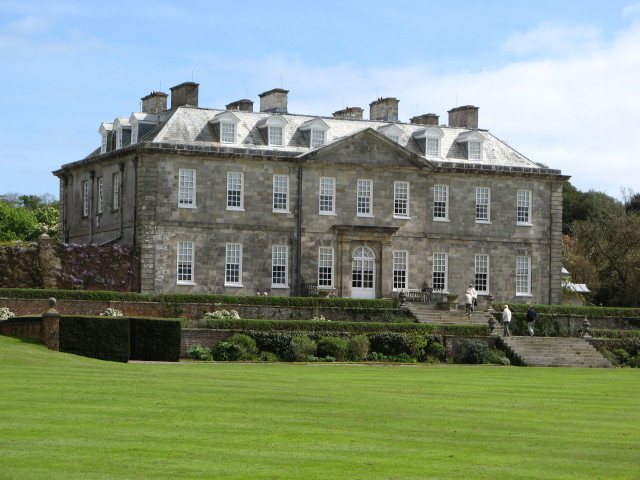
Antony House in south Cornwall, England, which served as Lord Ascot's estate in the film

This film was released on March 5, 2010. Principal photography was scheduled for May 2008, but did not begin until September and concluded in three months. Scenes set in the Victorian era were shot at Torpoint and Plymouth from September 1 to October 14. Two hundred and fifty local extras were chosen in early August. Locations included Antony House in Torpoint, Charlestown, Cornwall and the Barbican; however, no footage from the Barbican was used. Motion-capture filming began in early October at Sony Pictures Studios in Culver City, California, although the footage was later discarded. Filming also took place at Culver Studios also in Culver City. Burton said that he used a combination of live-action and animation, without motion-capture. He noted that this was the first time he had filmed on a green screen. Filming of the green screen portions, comprising 90% of the film, was completed after only 40 days. Many of the cast and crew felt nauseated as a result of the long hours surrounded by greenscreen, and Burton had lavender lenses fitted into his glasses to counteract the effect. Due to the constant need for visual effects to distort the actors' physical appearances, such as the size of the Red Queen's head or Alice's height, visual effects supervisor Ken Ralston cited the film as being exhausting, saying it was "The biggest show I've ever done, [and] the most creatively involved I've ever been."

Sony Pictures Imageworks designed the visual effects sequences. Burton felt 3D was appropriate to the story's environment. Burton and Zanuck chose to film with conventional cameras and convert the footage into 3D during post-production; Zanuck explained 3D cameras were too expensive and "clumsy" to use, and they felt that there was no difference between converted footage and those shot in the format. James Cameron, who released his 3D film Avatar in December 2009, criticized the choice, saying, "It doesn't make any sense to shoot in 2D and convert to 3D."

== Music ==
Danny Elfman composed the musical score for Alice in Wonderland, after scoring Burton's films. Elfman did not want to use period music and instead blended orchestral, classical, and pop music, to highlight the internal score. He had used symphony orchestration for the visual style of Burton, incorporating the same methods by Erich Wolfgang Korngold, Max Steiner, Franz Waxman, and Bernard Hermann. The score album was released by Walt Disney Records on March 2, 2010 and debuted at number 89 on the Billboard Top 200 albums chart.

A concept album titled Almost Alice is a collection of various artists' music inspired by the film. It was released by Walt Disney under the Buena Vista Records imprint, on the same day as the score album's release. The lead single, "Alice" by Avril Lavigne, premiered on January 27, 2010 on Ryan Seacrest's radio program. Other singles include "Follow Me Down" by 3OH!3, "Her Name Is Alice" by the band Shinedown, and "Tea Party" by Kerli.

== Marketing ==
=== Promotions ===
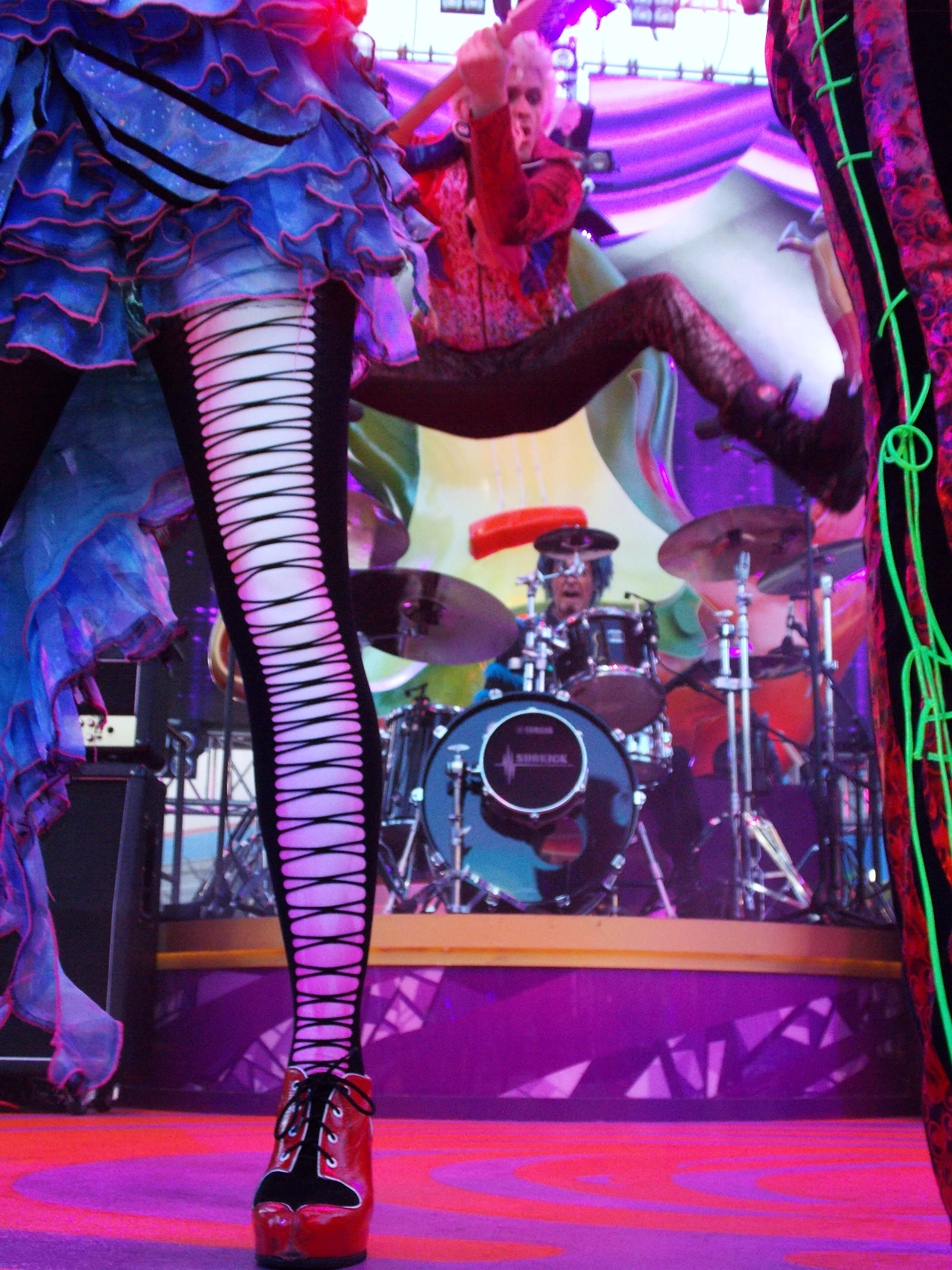
Mad T Party at California Adventure, showing the Dormouse on guitar, Cheshire Cat on drums, and Alice as lead singer

On June 22, 2009, the first pictures of the film were released, showing Wasikowska as Alice, Depp as the Mad Hatter, Hathaway as the White Queen, Bonham Carter as the Red Queen and Lucas as Tweedledum and Tweedledee. In July, new photos emerged of Alice holding a white rabbit, the Mad Hatter with a hare, the Red Queen holding a pig, and the White Queen with a mouse.

On July 22, 2009, a teaser trailer from the Mad Hatter's point of view was released on IGN but was shortly taken down because Disney claimed that the trailer was not supposed to be out yet. The teaser was also planned to premiere along with a trailer of Robert Zemeckis' film adaptation of A Christmas Carol on July 24, 2009, for G-Force. The next day, the teaser trailer premiered at San Diego Comic-Con, but the trailer shown was different from the one which leaked. The Comic-Con version didn't have the Mad Hatter's dialogue. Instead, it featured "Time to Pretend" by MGMT and the clips shown were in a different order than in the leaked version. The leaked version was originally to be shown to one of the three Facebook groups used to promote the film which had the most members. The groups used to promote the film are "The Loyal Subjects of the Red Queen", "The Loyal Subjects of the White Queen", and "The Disloyal Subjects of the Mad Hatter".

Also at Comic-Con, props from the film were displayed in an "Alice in Wonderland" exhibit. Costumes featured in the exhibit included the Red Queen's dress, chair, wig, glasses, and scepter; the White Queen's dress, wig and a small model of her castle; the Mad Hatter's suit, hat, wig, chair and table; Alice's dress and battle armor (to slay the Jabberwocky). Other props were the "DRINK ME" bottles, the keys, an "EAT ME" pastry, and stand-in models of the White Rabbit and March Hare. A nighttime party area at Disney California Adventure theme park was created, called "Mad T Party".

=== Video games ===
On July 23, 2009, Disney Interactive Studios announced that an Alice in Wonderland video game, developed by French game studio Étranges Libellules, would be released in the same week as the film for the Wii, Nintendo DS, and Microsoft Windows. The soundtrack was composed by video games music composer Richard Jacques. The Wii, DS, and PC versions were released on March 2, 2010.

Disney Interactive released the game Alice in Wonderland: A New Champion for iOS in 2013.

== Release ==
=== Theatrical ===
Alice in Wonderland was theatrically released in the UK and the U.S., in Disney Digital 3D, RealD 3D, and IMAX 3D as well as in regular theaters on March 5, 2010. Prior to the release, the film was premiered at the Odeon Leicester Square in London on February 25, 2010, for The Prince's Foundation for Children and The Arts fundraiser where the Prince of Wales and the Duchess of Cornwall attended.

On February 12, 2010, major UK theater chains, Odeon, Vue, and Cineworld had planned to boycott the film because of a reduction of the interval between cinema and DVD release from the usual seventeen-week period to twelve. Disney's pretext for cutting short Alice's theatrical run, is possibly to avoid the release of the DVD clashing with the 2010 FIFA World Cup. However, exhibitors protested that Alice would be less threatened by the World Cup than other titles. A week after the announcement, Cineworld, who has a 24% share of UK box office, chose to play the film on more than 150 screens. Cineworld's chief executive Steve Wiener said, "As leaders in 3D, we did not want the public to miss out on such a visual spectacle. As the success of Avatar has shown, there is currently a huge appetite for the 3D experience." Shortly after, the Vue cinema chain also reached an agreement with Disney, but Odeon had still chosen to boycott in Britain, Ireland, and Italy. On February 25, 2010, Odeon had reached an agreement and decided to show the film on March 5. It also did not affect their plans to show the film in Spain, Germany, Portugal, and Austria.

=== Home media ===
Walt Disney Studios Home Entertainment released a three-disc Blu-ray combo pack (which includes the Blu-ray, DVD, and a digital copy), single-disc Blu-ray and single-disc DVD on June 1, 2010, in North America and July 1, 2010, in Australia. The DVD release includes three short features about the making of the film, focusing on Burton's vision for Wonderland and the characters of Alice and the Mad Hatter. The Blu-ray version has nine additional featurettes centered on additional characters, visual effects and other aspects of the film's production. With some confusion, a small number of copies were put on shelves a week before schedule in smaller stores, but were quickly removed, although a handful of copies were confirmed purchased ahead of schedule.

In its first week of release (June 1–6, 2010), it sold 2,095,878 DVD units (equivalent to $35,441,297) and topped the DVD sales chart for two continuous weeks. By May 22, 2011, it had sold 4,313,680 units ($76,413,043). It failed to crack the 2010 top ten DVDs list in terms of units sold, but reached 10th place on that chart in terms of sales revenue.

== Reception ==
=== Box office ===
Alice in Wonderland grossed $334.1 million in North America and $691.2 million in other territories for a worldwide total of $1.025 billion against a budget of $200 million. Worldwide, it is the second-highest-grossing film of 2010. It is the third-highest-grossing film starring Johnny Depp, the highest-grossing film directed by Tim Burton, and the second-highest-grossing film with Anne Hathaway in the cast. It is also the 50th-highest grossing film ever made (subject to regular change). Additionally, it is the second-highest-grossing children's book adaptation (worldwide, as well as in North America and outside North America separately).

On its first weekend, the film made $220.1 million worldwide, marking the second-largest opening ever for a movie not released during the summer or the holiday period (behind The Hunger Games), the fourth-largest for a Disney-distributed film and the fourth-largest among 2010 films. It dominated for three consecutive weekends at the worldwide box office. On May 26, 2010, its 85th day of release, it became the sixth film ever to surpass the $1 billion mark and the second film that had been released by Walt Disney Studios that did so.

In North America, Alice in Wonderland is the forty-fourth-highest-grossing film out of the top 100 when adjusted for inflation. It is also the second-highest-grossing film of 2010, behind Toy Story 3, the second-highest-grossing film starring Johnny Depp and the highest-grossing film directed by Tim Burton. The film opened on March 5, 2010, on approximately 7,400 screens at 3,728 theaters with $40.8 million during its first day, $3.9 million of which came from midnight showings, ranking number one and setting a new March opening-day record. Alice earned $116.1 million on its opening weekend, breaking the record for the largest opening weekend in March (previously held by 300), the record for the largest opening weekend during springtime (previously held by Fast & Furious), the largest opening weekend for a non-sequel (previously held by Spider-Man) and the highest one for the non-holiday, non-summer period.

All of these records were broken by The Hunger Games ($152.5 million) in March 2012. Alice had the seventeenth-highest-grossing opening weekend ever and the fifth-largest among 3D films. Opening-weekend grosses originating from 3D showings were $81.3 million (70% of total weekend gross). That broke the record for the largest opening-weekend 3D grosses but it was later topped by The Avengers ($108 million). It had the largest weekend per-theater average of 2010 ($31,143 per theater) and the largest for a PG-rated film. It broke the IMAX opening-weekend record by earning $12.2 million on 188 IMAX screens, with an average of $64,197 per site. The record was first overtaken by Deathly Hallows – Part 2 ($15.2 million). Additionally, it had the biggest opening weekend for a film starring Tim Burton, smashing the previous record held by Planet of the Apes. Alice remained in first place for three consecutive weekends at the North American box office. Alice closed in theaters on July 8, 2010, with $334.2 million.

Outside North America, Alice is the thirteenth-highest-grossing film, the highest-grossing 2010 film, the fourth-highest-grossing Disney film, the second-highest-grossing film starring Johnny Depp and the highest-grossing film directed by Tim Burton. It began with an estimated $94 million, on top of the weekend box office, and remained at the summit for four consecutive weekends and five in total. Japan was the film's highest-grossing country after North America, with $133.7 million, followed by the UK, Ireland and Malta ($64.4 million), and France and the Maghreb region ($45.9 million).

=== Critical response ===
On the review aggregator Rotten Tomatoes, 51% of 275 critics have given the film a positive review, with an average rating of 5.9/10. The website's consensus is: "Tim Burton's Alice sacrifices the book's minimal narrative coherence—and much of its heart—but it's an undeniable visual treat." According to Metacritic, which calculated a weighted average score of 53 out of 100 based on 38 reviews, the film received "mixed or average" reviews. Audiences polled by CinemaScore gave the film an average rating of "A−" on an A+ to F scale.

Todd McCarthy of Variety praised it for its "moments of delight, humor and bedazzlement", but continued, "But it also becomes more ordinary as it goes along, building to a generic battle climax similar to any number of others in CGI-heavy movies of the past few years." Michael Rechtshaffen of The Hollywood Reporter said "Burton has delivered a subversively witty, brilliantly cast, whimsically appointed dazzler that also manages to hit all the emotionally satisfying marks", while as well lauding its computer-generated imagery (CGI), saying "Ultimately, it's the visual landscape that makes Alice's newest adventure so wondrous, as technology has finally been able to catch up with Burton's endlessly fertile imagination." Owen Gleiberman of Entertainment Weekly said, "But Burton's Disneyfied 3-D Alice in Wonderland, written by the girl-power specialist Linda Woolverton, is a strange brew indeed: murky, diffuse, and meandering, set not in a Wonderland that pops with demented life but in a world called Underland that's like a joyless, bombed-out version of Wonderland. It looks like a CGI head trip gone post apocalyptic. In the film's rather humdrum 3-D, the place doesn't dazzle—it droops."

Roger Ebert of the Chicago Sun-Times awarded the film three out of four stars and writing, "Alice plays better as an adult hallucination, which is how Burton rather brilliantly interprets it until a pointless third act flies off the rails." Danny Elfman's score received particular praise by critics, with Jonathan Broxton saying "What is even more impressive, however, is the knowledge that Elfman's the composer of intellectual authority is as much in play here as Elfman the enthusiastic newcomer; the vibrancy of the work, the structure of the themes, the cleverness of the orchestrations and harmonies, combined with the flavors of the past, make this score indispensable. Even by his own recent high standards, it's the best Elfman score in many years, and even at this early stage a contender for the best score of 2010." Philip French of The Guardian criticized the film, writing, "this curiously flat film is never particularly funny and rarely demonstrates Burton's gifts as a spellbinding move tale-teller."

Several reviews criticized the decision to turn Alice into a "colonialist entrepreneur" at the end of the film setting sail for China. Given Britain's role in the First and Second Opium Wars during the Victorian era and the foreign domination of China through "unequal treaties", China expert Kevin Slaten writes, "Not only is it troubling imagery, for a female role model in a Disney movie, but it's also a celebration of the exploitation that China suffered for a century."

Game developer American McGee, best known for creating Alice and Alice: Madness Returns, was asked in a 2011 interview about Tim Burton's interpretation of the title character since both versions share a similar dark and twisted tone of Wonderland. McGee praised the film's visuals and audio but criticized the lack of screen time Alice had compared to the other characters. He felt Alice did not have any purpose in the story and that she was merely used as a "tool".

=== Accolades ===
At the 83rd Academy Awards, the film received three nominations: Best Art Direction, Best Costume Design, and Best Visual Effects winning the former two. At the 64th British Academy Film Awards, the film received five nominations and won two awards for Best Costume Design and Best Makeup and Hair. It received three nominations at the 68th Golden Globe Awards including Best Motion Picture – Musical or Comedy and Best Actor – Motion Picture Musical or Comedy for Johnny Depp, but did not win any of those. It further received nominations for five Satellite Awards and Saturn Awards each (winning two of them), four Critics' Choice Movie Awards (winning two), and a Grammy Award nomination.

== Legacy ==
After its release, the film drove about $1.6 billion in retail sales for Disney, including home video and merchandise sales. Since the release and success of the movie, Walt Disney Pictures has announced the development of several live-action adaptations of their Animated Classics series.

Walt Disney Theatrical was in early talks with Burton and screenwriter Linda Woolverton, who had written stage adaptions of The Lion King, Beauty and the Beast, Aida, and Lestat, to develop the property as a Broadway musical set to premiere in London. Rob Ashford was attached to direct and choreograph. As of 2013, no further developments had been made.

== Sequel ==
A sequel, Alice Through the Looking Glass, was released on May 27, 2016, directed by James Bobin. Burton returned to produce it, and Woolverton returned to write a screenplay. Mia Wasikowska, Johnny Depp, and Helena Bonham Carter reprised their roles in the film, with the addition of Rhys Ifans and Sacha Baron Cohen.

== See also ==
- 2010 in film
- List of American films of 2010
- Films and television programs based on Alice in Wonderland
- List of Walt Disney Pictures films
- List of Walt Disney Studios films (2010–2019)
- List of films featuring miniature people

== Bibliography ==
- Casey, Jo; Gilbert, Laura (2010). Alice in Wonderland: The Visual Guide. DK Children. ISBN 978-0-7566-5982-0.
