= Ken Ralston =

American visual effects artist (born 1954)

Ralston in 2007

Kenneth Ralston (born 1954) is an American visual effects artist, currently the Visual Effect Supervisor and Creative Head at Sony Pictures Imageworks. Ralston began his career at the commercial animation and visual effects company, Cascade Pictures in Hollywood, where he worked on over 150 advertising campaigns in the early 1970s. In 1976, he was hired at Industrial Light & Magic by Dennis Muren to help George Lucas create the effects for Star Wars. He remained at ILM for 20 years before joining Sony Pictures Imageworks as president. Ralston is best known for his work in the films of Robert Zemeckis.

Ralston has won five Academy Award for Best Visual Effects, including a Special Achievement Academy Award for the visual effects in Return of the Jedi (1983), and regular awards for his work on Cocoon (1985), Who Framed Roger Rabbit (1988), Death Becomes Her (1992) and Forrest Gump (1994). He was nominated three more times for Dragonslayer (1981), Back to the Future Part II (1989) and Alice in Wonderland (2010).

Ken has contributed to several DVD commentaries:

- King Kong (1933) - with visual effects creator Ray Harryhausen
- Mighty Joe Young (1949) - with visual effects creator Ray Harryhausen and actress Terry Moore
- Who Framed Roger Rabbit (1988) - with director Robert Zemeckis, producer Frank Marshall, associate producer Steve Starkey, screenwriters Jeffrey Price and Peter S. Seaman
- Contact (1997) - with visual effects supervisor Stephen Rosenbaum
- Cast Away (2000) - with cinematographer Don Burgess, visual effects supervisor Carey Villegas, sound designer and supervising sound editor Randy Thom

== Filmography ==
- Star Wars (1977) (assistant cameraman: miniature and optical effects unit)
- The Empire Strikes Back (1980) (visual effects cameraman: miniature and optical effects unit)
- Dragonslayer (1981) (dragon supervisor: ILM)
- Star Trek II: The Wrath of Khan (1982) (visual effects supervisor: ILM)
- Return of the Jedi (1983) (visual effects)
- Star Trek III: The Search for Spock (1984) (visual effects supervisor)
- Cocoon (1985) (visual effects supervisor)
- Back to the Future (1985) (visual effects supervisor)
- Star Trek IV: The Voyage Home (1986) (visual effects supervisor)
- The Golden Child (1986) (visual effects supervisor)
- Who Framed Roger Rabbit (1988) (visual effects supervisor)
- Back to the Future Part II (1989) (visual effects supervisor)
- Dreams (1990) (visual effects supervisor)
- Back to the Future Part III (1990) (visual effects supervisor)
- The Rocketeer (1991) (special visual effects supervisor, second unit director)
- Death Becomes Her (1992) (visual effects supervisor)
- Forrest Gump (1994) (visual effects supervisor)
- The Mask (1994) (visual effects consultant)
- The American President (1995) (visual effects supervisor)
- Jumanji (1995) (visual effects supervisor)
- Phenomenon (1996) (visual effects supervisor: SPI)
- Michael (1996) (visual effects supervisor: SPI)
- Contact (1997) (visual effects supervisor)
- Patch Adams (1998) (visual effects guru)
- Cast Away (2000) (visual effects supervisor)
- America's Sweethearts (2001) (visual effects consultant)
- Men in Black II (2002) (visual effects supervisor: SPI)
- The Forgotten (2004) (visual effects consultant)
- The Polar Express (2004) (visual effects supervisor)
- Beowulf (2007) (visual effects supervisor)
- Alice in Wonderland (2010) (visual effects supervisor)
- Men in Black 3 (2012) (visual effects supervisor)
- Alice Through the Looking Glass (2016) (visual effects supervisor)
