= Diane Thomas =

American screenwriter (1946–1985)

- Thomas in 1979
- Born: Diane Renee Thomas; January 7, 1946; Sault Ste. Marie, Michigan, U.S.
- Died: October 21, 1985 (aged 39); Topanga, California, U.S.
- Education: University of Southern California
- Occupation: Screenwriter
- Years active: 1978–1985
- Notable work: Romancing the Stone; Always

Diane Renee Thomas (January 7, 1946 – October 21, 1985) was an American screenwriter who wrote the 1984 film Romancing the Stone, her only produced screenplay credit. She was also originally hired to write the third Indiana Jones film, completing a first draft set in a haunted house before George Lucas and Steven Spielberg decided on a different approach.

Early promotional materials for the 1989 film Always credited Thomas as the film's co-writer, but the final film credits list Jerry Belson as the sole screenwriter.

== Early life and education ==
Thomas was born January 7, 1946, in Sault Ste. Marie, Michigan. Her family moved to Long Beach, California, when she was 12 years old. She enrolled at the University of Southern California (USC), and graduated with a degree in marketing. She next worked as an advertising copywriter. However, she grew tired of copy writing and later enrolled at the Actors Studio, studying under Sherman Marks and Jack Garfein. There, she wrote short sketches and performed with several improvisational acting groups. Meanwhile, she enrolled in graduate school studying clinical psychology.

== Career ==
=== Romancing the Stone ===
In 1978, while writing Romancing the Stone, Thomas was a cocktail waitress at Coral Beach Cantina on the Pacific Coast Highway. John Hill, a screenwriter and friend of Thomas's, read her script and called his agent, Norman Kurland, praising the spec script. A year later, Kurland presented the script to several major studios, including Columbia Pictures, which purchased the script. Sherry Lansing, a Columbia Pictures executive, suggested he collaborate with Michael Douglas. At the time, Douglas was looking for a different kind of project, separate in tone from One Flew Over the Cuckoo's Nest (1975) and The China Syndrome (1979). However, in 1983, the project fell apart at Columbia, but Douglas revived the project at 20th Century Fox. He phoned Robert Zemeckis wanting him to direct the film, having admired his earlier film Used Cars (1980). Three days later, Douglas and Zemeckis flew out to Mexico to begin location scouting.

According to other accounts, the script was sold as a Cinderella story in itself: Thomas pitched the story directly to Douglas when the actor happened to come into her café as a customer. This account, however, is disputed. Douglas said of the script, "It just had a spontaneity about the writing ... She was not cautious. The script had a wonderful spirit about it. ... There was a total lack of fear to the writing. It worked." The Romancing the Stone screenplay was sold for $250,000.

Despite the script being written years earlier, Richard Corliss and Richard Schickel, in a Time magazine article, derided Romancing the Stone as a Raiders of the Lost Ark ripoff. The film became one of the highest-grossing films of 1984, earning $115 million worldwide. Based on her success, Thomas lectured and spoke at writers conferences.

=== Other works ===
She was personally hired by Steven Spielberg to write screenplays for Amblin Entertainment, writing one script titled Blonde Hurricane, an adaptation of P. Howard's book of the same name. Thomas also wrote a script draft for the film Always (1989). At the time of her death, she had completed the first draft for the third Indiana Jones film, reportedly set in a haunted mansion. George Lucas had initially suggested this approach, but Spielberg resisted the setting feeling it too closely resembled his earlier film Poltergeist (1982), resulting in the realization of Indiana Jones and the Last Crusade (1989) instead.

Thomas's death came six weeks before the sequel to Romancing the Stone, The Jewel of the Nile (1985), was released. At the time, Thomas was unavailable to write The Jewel of the Nile as she was under contract with Spielberg; she nevertheless received a "Based on characters created by" credit. Douglas turned to Mark Rosenthal and Lawrence Konner to write the script, but Kathleen Turner disapproved of the handling of her character. Douglas hired another screenwriting team, Ken Levine and David Isaacs, to rewrite the script, but the opening act need revising. During one weekend, Thomas met with Levine and Issacs to consult on the script, helping to strengthen the first 30 pages. As a gesture of gratitude, Douglas offered to purchase Thomas a new car. Thomas's friend, Los Angeles Times reporter Betty Spence, urged Thomas to select a Mercedes Sedan, thinking it would be more practical, but Thomas instead selected a Porsche Carrera.

== Death ==
On October 21, 1985, Thomas, her boyfriend, and another friend Ian Young attended classes at Pepperdine University and stopped for drinks on the way home. The group was traveling in Thomas's Porsche Carrera when the car, traveling about 80 miles per hour (130 km/h), spun around on the rain-slick Pacific Coast Highway and struck a telephone pole just south of Coastline Drive near Topanga, California. Thomas, a backseat passenger, was killed instantly. Young was taken to UCLA Medical Center, where he died from his injuries two hours later. Thomas's boyfriend was hospitalized with internal injuries. He was arrested under suspicion of "driving under the influence of alcohol," and was subsequently convicted of manslaughter in the deaths of Thomas and Young. He received a sentence of five years' probation.

== Diane Thomas Screenwriting Awards ==
Following her death, in 1987, the UCLA Extension Writers' Program created the Diane Thomas Screenwriting Awards in her honor, only open to UCLA Extension screenwriting students who took three Extension classes the previous year. Original judges included Steven Spielberg, Michael Douglas, James L. Brooks, Norman Kurland, and Kathleen Kennedy. The first recipient of the award was Randi Mayem Singer (A 22¢ Romance), who later wrote Mrs. Doubtfire (1993), other first-place winners of the award include: Carol Heikkinen (Center Stage (2000 film), The Thing Called Love, Empire Records) for her script Alive and Well, Gavin Hood, Stuart Beattie, and Carol Barbee. The UCLA Extension Screenplay Competition replaced the Diane Thomas Screenwriting Award in 2006.
