= Planet of the Apes (2001 film) =

2001 film by Tim Burton

- Theatrical release poster
- Directed by: Tim Burton
- Screenplay by: William Broyles Jr.; Lawrence Konner; Mark Rosenthal
- Based on: Planet of the Apes by Pierre Boulle
- Produced by: Richard D. Zanuck
- Starring: Mark Wahlberg; Tim Roth; Helena Bonham Carter; Michael Clarke Duncan; Kris Kristofferson; Estella Warren; Paul Giamatti
- Cinematography: Philippe Rousselot
- Edited by: Chris Lebenzon
- Music by: Danny Elfman
- Production companies: 20th Century Fox; The Zanuck Company
- Distributed by: 20th Century Fox
- Release date: July 27, 2001
- Running time: 120 minutes
- Country: United States
- Language: English
- Budget: $100 million
- Box office: $362.2 million

Planet of the Apes is a 2001 American science fiction action adventure film directed by Tim Burton from a screenplay by William Broyles Jr., Lawrence Konner, and Mark Rosenthal. The sixth installment in the Planet of the Apes film series, it is loosely based on the 1963 novel of the same name by Pierre Boulle and serves as a remake of the 1968 film version. The film stars Mark Wahlberg, Tim Roth, Helena Bonham Carter, Michael Clarke Duncan, Kris Kristofferson, Estella Warren, and Paul Giamatti. It tells the story of astronaut Leo Davidson (Wahlberg) crash-landing on a planet inhabited by intelligent apes. The apes treat humans as slaves, but with the help of an ape named Ari (Bonham Carter), Leo starts a rebellion as he seeks to return.

Development for a Planet of the Apes remake started as far back as 1988 with Adam Rifkin. His project nearly reached the pre-production stage before being canceled. Terry Hayes's script, titled Return of the Apes, would have starred Arnold Schwarzenegger, under the direction of Phillip Noyce. Oliver Stone, Don Murphy, and Jane Hamsher were set to produce. Creative differences ensued between Hayes and 20th Century Fox. Chris Columbus, Sam Hamm, James Cameron, Peter Jackson, and the Hughes brothers later became involved. With Broyles Jr.'s script, Burton was hired as director, and the film was put into active development. Konner and Rosenthal rewrote the script, and filming took place from November 2000 to April 2001.

Planet of the Apes was released in the United States on July 27, 2001, by 20th Century Fox. The film received mixed reviews from critics, who criticized the screenplay and twist ending, but praised Rick Baker's prosthetic makeup designs, visual aspects, and musical score. It grossed $362.2 million worldwide, becoming the ninth-highest-grossing film of 2001. Despite its financial success, Fox chose to cancel the sequel. Ten years later, the film was rebooted into film series in 2011 with the title, Rise of the Planet of the Apes.

== Plot ==
In 2029, aboard the space station Oberon, Leo Davidson works closely with apes who are trained for space missions. His favorite is a chimpanzee named Pericles. As a deadly electromagnetic storm approaches the station, a small space pod piloted by Pericles probes it. Pericles's pod heads into the storm and disappears. Leo takes a second pod to find Pericles, despite lacking authority to do so. Entering the storm, Leo loses contact with the Oberon and, in 5021 A.D., crashes on a planet called Ashlar. He learns that the world is ruled by intelligent apes who treat humans as slaves.

Leo meets a female chimpanzee named Ari, who protests the mistreatment humans receive. Ari decides to buy Leo and a female slave named Daena to have them serve as servants in her father Senator Sandar's house. Leo escapes his cage and frees other humans. Limbo, an orangutan trader in captured humans, sees them but is taken prisoner to keep him silent. The murderous General Thade and his gorilla junior, Colonel Attar, march ape warriors to pursue the humans.

Leo discovers Calima, the forbidden, holy temple of "Semos", the first ape, whom the apes revere as a god and believe will someday return. Calima turns out to be the remains of the Oberon which had crashed on the planet's surface and now looks ancient. (Note: The name Calima comes from the sign "CAution LIve aniMAls", the relevant letters being the only ones not covered in dust.) According to the computer logs, the station has been there for millennia. Leo realizes that when he entered the vortex, he was pushed forward in time, while the Oberon, searching for him, was not, crashing on the planet long before he did.

The Oberon's log reveals that the apes on board, led by Semos, organized a mutiny and took over the vessel after it crashed. The human and ape survivors of the struggle left the ship, and their descendants are the people Leo has encountered since landing. The apes arrive and attack the humans gathered to see Leo, though he evens the odds by using Oberon's last fuel fragments to fire a final blast at the first wave. The battle stops when a familiar vehicle descends from the sky: the pod piloted by Pericles, also pushed through time and having just reached the planet. (Note: The electromagnetic storm releases people from it in the opposite direction in time to their entrance because they were traveling backward, not forward in time.) When Pericles lands and the undamaged pod opens, the apes interpret him as Semos, and hostilities between humans and apes suddenly cease.

Pericles runs into the wreck of the Oberon and Leo runs after him, followed by Thade. Thade fights Leo and Pericles until he takes Leo's gun and tries to shoot him. Leo sees that Thade is within the pilot's deck and closes the automatic door, trapping him inside. Thade fires the gun repeatedly at the door, but the ricochets create sparks that scare him, and he huddles under a control panel. Deciding to escape Ashlar and return to Earth, Leo gives Pericles to Ari, who promises to look after him. After saying farewell to Ari and Daena, Leo climbs aboard Pericles' pod and travels through the same electromagnetic storm.

Leo crashes in Washington, D.C., on Earth and looks up at what appears to be the Lincoln Memorial, only to find it now memorializing Thade. A swarm of police officers, firefighters, and news reporters descends upon him, but Leo sees that they are apes and realizes that he is on an ape-dominated Earth.

== Cast ==
=== Apes ===
- Tim Roth as General Thade: An ambitious and brutal chimpanzee military commander who wants control over the ape civilization. Thade intends to marry Ari, but she denies him due to his cold soul. Gary Oldman was originally cast in the role, but dropped out for financial reasons. Oldman would later appear in Dawn of the Planet of the Apes as Dreyfus, one of the film's antagonists. Roth declined the role of Severus Snape in Harry Potter and the Philosopher's Stone because of his commitment to Planet of the Apes. Alan Rickman was eventually cast as Snape. Roth rewrote some scenes to give his character a more frightening presence.
- Helena Bonham Carter as Ari: A virtuous chimpanzee who protests the way humans are treated. She helps Leo lead the rebellion. Burton met Bonham Carter while casting for the film, telling her "Don't take this the wrong way, but you were the first person I thought of to play a chimpanzee." They were in a relationship for 13 years and had two children.
- Michael Clarke Duncan as Colonel Attar: A gorilla military officer who was Thade's associate and second in-command. Djimon Hounsou had turned down the role because of scheduling conflicts with The Four Feathers. Ron Perlman was also a potential candidate that Rick Baker vouched for and even did a design on an old life cast. Duncan was hired to portray the role of Attar in October 2000.
- Paul Giamatti as Limbo: An orangutan who works in the trade business of human slaves. Limbo is caught in the conflict between humans and apes and tries his best to survive. Giamatti drew inspiration from W. C. Fields for his performance.
- Cary-Hiroyuki Tagawa as General Krull: A firm but fair gorilla and former military leader whose career had been destroyed by Thade. Krull became a servant of Senator Sandar and assisted the humans in their rebellion.
- David Warner as Senator Sandar, a chimpanzee politician and Ari's father.
- Lisa Marie as Nova, Senator Nado's chimpanzee companion.
- Glenn Shadix as Senator Nado, an orangutan politician in the ape society.

=== Humans ===
- Mark Wahlberg as Captain Leo Davidson
  An astronaut who accidentally enters a portal to another world inhabited by intelligent apes and is captured by them. Leo leads a rebellion of the planet's humans. Wahlberg had backed out of a commitment to Ocean's Eleven to take this role in Planet of the Apes (Matt Damon was eventually cast in the Ocean's Eleven role). Whereas other actors contending for the Leo Davidson role wanted to see the script before signing a contract, Wahlberg signed on after a five-minute meeting with Burton. To avoid evoking associations with his previous work as an underwear model, Wahlberg did not wear a loincloth, even though Heston had worn one in the original film.
- Kris Kristofferson as Karubi, Daena's father. Karubi is killed by Thade while trying to escape. Kristofferson had immediately agreed to be cast. "The director Tim Burton is a hero of mine. I have eight kids and we've seen all of his films from Pee-wee's Big Adventure to Sleepy Hollow many times".
- Estella Warren as Daena
  A female slave and Karubi's daughter, she develops a romantic attraction to Leo.
- Erick Avari as Tival, a member of the human resistance.
- Luke Eberl as Birn, a young human who fights in the rebellion.
- Evan Dexter Parke as Gunnar, a member of the human resistance.

Other roles include Freda Foh Shen as Bon. Chris Ellis as Lieutenant Karl Vasich. Anne Ramsay as Lieutenant Colonel Grace Alexander. Michael Jace as Major Frank Santos. Andrea Grano as Major Maria Cooper. Kam Heskin, Candace Kroslak and Melody Perkins as friends At Leo's party. Jonah & Jacob (both uncredited) as Pericles, the trained chimpanzee who works with Leo on the space station.

There are also cameo appearances by Charlton Heston (uncredited) as Zaius, Thade's Father, and Linda Harrison (The Woman In The Cart). Both participated in the first two films in the original series, Planet of the Apes (1968) and Beneath the Planet of the Apes (1970) as George Taylor and Nova, respectively.

== Development ==
=== Late 1980s ===
20th Century Fox president Craig Baumgarten was impressed with Adam Rifkin's filmmaking with Never on Tuesday. In 1988, Rifkin was brought in the studio to pitch ideas for films. Rifkin, being a fan of the 1968 Planet of the Apes felt it was best to continue the film series. "Having independent film experience, I promised I could write and direct a huge-looking film for a reasonable price and budget, like Aliens." Fox commissioned Rifkin to write what amounted to a sequel, "but not a sequel to the fifth film, an alternate sequel to the first film". He took influences from Spartacus, with the storyline being "the ape empire had reached its Roman era. A descendant of Charlton Heston's character named Duke would eventually lead a human slave revolt against the oppressive Romanesque apes, led by General Izan. A real sword and sandal spectacular, monkey style. Gladiator did the same movie without the ape costumes."

Titled Return to the Planet of the Apes, the project was put on fast track and almost entered pre-production. Rick Baker was hired to design the prosthetic makeup with Danny Elfman composing the film score. Tom Cruise and Charlie Sheen were in contention for the lead role. "I can't accurately describe in words the utter euphoria I felt knowing that I, Adam Rifkin, was going to be resurrecting the Planet of the Apes. It all seemed too good to be true. I soon found out it was." Days before the film was to commence pre-production, new studio executives arrived at Fox, which caused creative differences between Rifkin and the studio. Rifkin was commissioned to rewrite the script through various drafts. The project was abandoned until Peter Jackson and Fran Walsh pitched their own idea, with the apes going through a Renaissance. In the story, the ape government becomes concerned over the new art works, the humans are revolting and the liberal apes shelter a half-human, half-ape from the gorillas. Roddy McDowall was enthusiastic about their proposal and agreed to play the Leonardo da Vinci-type character they had written for him. However, the executive Jackson spoke to was not a fan of the series and seemingly unaware of McDowall's involvement in the series, and Jackson turned his attention back to Heavenly Creatures.

=== Oliver Stone ===
By 1993, Fox hired Don Murphy and Jane Hamsher as producers. Sam Raimi and Oliver Stone were being considered as possible directors, though Stone signed on as executive producer/co-writer with a $1 million salary. On the storyline, Stone explained in December 1993, "It has the discovery of cryogenically frozen Vedic Apes who hold the secret numeric codes to the Bible that foretold the end of civilizations. It deals with past versus the future. My concept is that there's a code inscribed in the Bible that predicts all historical events. The apes were there at the beginning and figured it all out."

Stone brought Terry Hayes to write the screenplay entitled Return of the Apes. Set in the near future, a plague is making humans extinct. Geneticist Will Robinson discovers the plague is a genetic time bomb embedded in the Stone Age. He time travels with a pregnant colleague named Billie Rae Diamond to a time when Palaeolithic humans were at war for the future of the planet with highly evolved apes. The apes' supreme commander is a gorilla named Drak. Robinson and Billie Rae discover a young human girl named Aiv (pronounced Eve) to be the next step in evolution. It is revealed that it was the apes that created the virus to destroy the human race. They protect her from the virus, thus ensuring the survival of the human race 102,000 years later. Billie Rae gives birth to a baby boy named Adam.

Fox president Peter Chernin called Return of the Apes "one of the best scripts I ever read". Chernin was hoping Hayes' script would create a franchise that included sequels, spin-off television shows and merchandise. In March 1994, Arnold Schwarzenegger signed on as Will Robinson with the condition he had approval of director. Chuck Russell was considered as a possible director before Phillip Noyce was hired in January 1995, while pre-production was nearing commencement with a $100 million budget. Stone first approached Rick Baker, who worked on Rifkin's failed remake, to design the prosthetic makeup, but eventually hired Stan Winston.

Fox became frustrated by the distance between their approach and Hayes' interpretation of Stone's ideas. As producer Don Murphy put it, "Terry wrote a Terminator and Fox wanted The Flintstones". Fox studio executive Dylan Sellers felt the script could be improved by comedy. "What if Robinson finds himself in Ape land and the Apes are trying to play baseball? But they're missing one element, like the pitcher or something." Sellers continued. "Robinson knows what they're missing and he shows them, and they all start playing." Sellers refused to give up his baseball scene, and when Hayes turned in the next script, sans baseball, Sellers fired him. Dissatisfied with Sellers' decision to fire Hayes, Noyce left Return of the Apes in February 1995 to work on The Saint.

=== Columbus and Cameron ===
Stone pursued other films of his own, Chernin was replaced by Thomas Rothman, and Sellers ran a stop sign while intoxicated, slamming into a palm tree, killing his friend and Fox colleague Lewis Cherot, ultimately earning jail time. Meanwhile producers Murphy and Hamsher were paid off. "After they got rid of us, they brought on Chris Columbus", Murphy stated. "Then I heard they did tests of apes skiing, which didn't make much sense." Stan Winston was still working on the makeup designs. Columbus brought Sam Hamm, his co-writer on an unproduced Fantastic Four script, to write the screenplay. "We tried to do a story that was simultaneously an homage to the elements we liked from the five films, and would also incorporate a lot of material [from Pierre Boulle's novel] that had been jettisoned from the earlier production," Hamm continued. "The first half of the script bore little resemblance to the book, but a lot of the stuff in the second half comes directly from it, or directly inspired by it."

Hamm's script had an ape astronaut from another planet crash-landing in New York Harbor, launching a virus that will make human beings extinct. Dr. Susan Landis, who works for the Centers for Disease Control and Prevention, and Alexander Troy, an Area 51 scientist, use the ape's spacecraft to return to the virus' planet of origin, hoping to find an antidote. They find an urban environment where apes armed with heavy weapons hunt humans. The main villain was Lord Zaius; in contrast to Dr. Zaius, Lord Zaius was very cruel to the humans. Landis and Troy discover the antidote and return to Earth, only to find in their 74-year absence that apes have taken over the planet. "The Statue of Liberty's once proud porcelain features have been crudely chiseled into the grotesque likeness of a great grinning ape".

Schwarzenegger remained attached, but Fox had mixed emotions with Hamm's script. When Columbus dropped out in late 1995 to work on Jingle All the Way, Fox offered the director's position to Roland Emmerich in January 1996. James Cameron was in talks during the filming of Titanic as writer and producer. Cameron's version would have drawn elements from the original film and its sequel Beneath the Planet of the Apes. Cameron approached Peter Hyams to direct the film, a choice that dissatisfied the studio. Also, following the financial and critical success of Titanic, Cameron dropped out. After learning about his previous involvement, Chernin and Rothman met with Peter Jackson to learn about his original Renaissance idea. Jackson turned down directing the film with Schwarzenegger and Cameron as his producer, recognizing they would probably conflict over the direction. Schwarzenegger left to work on Eraser. Michael Bay then turned down the director's position. Jackson again turned down the project while facing the possible cancellation of The Lord of the Rings in 1998, because he was unenthusiastic following Roddy McDowall's death. In mid-1999, the Hughes brothers were interested in directing but were committed to From Hell.

=== Pre-production ===
In 1999, William Broyles Jr. turned down the chance to write the script, but decided to sign on "when I found out I could have an extensive amount of creative control". Fox projected the release date for July 2001, while Broyles sent the studio an outline and a chronicle of the fictional planet "Aschlar". Entitled The Visitor and billed as "episode one in the Chronicles of Aschlar", Broyles' script caught the attention of director Tim Burton, who signed on to direct the film in February 2000. The film deviated from Burton's usual gothic films. "I wasn't interested in doing a remake or a sequel of the original Planet of the Apes film," Burton said later. "But I was intrigued by the idea of revisiting that world. Like a lot of people, I was affected by the original film. I wanted to do a 're-imagining'." Richard D. Zanuck, who served as the president of the studio around the original film's release, signed on as producer in March. "This is a very emotional film for me. I greenlighted the original Apes when I was the head of Fox in 1967."

Under Burton's direction, Broyles wrote another draft, but his script was projected at a $200 million budget. Fox wanted to cut it to $100 million. In August 2000, two months before principal photography, Fox brought Lawrence Konner and Mark Rosenthal for rewrites. Broyles "had a lot of respect with the work they [Konner and Rosenthal] did. And to think that given what I'd done and given what Tim wanted, they navigated the right course." One of the considered endings had Leo Davidson crash-landing at Yankee Stadium, witnessing apes playing baseball. Various alternatives were considered before the filmmakers decided on the final one. The production of Planet of the Apes was a difficult experience for Burton. This was largely contributed by Fox's adamant release date (July 2001), which meant that everything from pre-production to editing and visual effects work was rushed.

Konner and Rosenthal were rewriting the script even as sets were being constructed. Ari, Helena Bonham Carter's character, was originally a princess. She was changed to "a Senator's daughter with a liberal mentality". One of the drafts had General Thade, Tim Roth's character, as an albino gorilla, but Burton felt chimpanzees were more frightening. Limbo, Paul Giamatti's character "was supposed to turn into a good guy. There was supposed to be this touching personal growth thing at the end," Giamatti reflected. "But Tim [Burton] and I both thought that was kind of lame so we decided to just leave him as a jerk into the end."

=== Filming ===
Burton wanted to begin filming in October 2000, but it was pushed back to November 6, 2000, and ended in April 2001. Filming for Planet of the Apes began at Lake Powell, where parts of the original film were shot. Due to a local drought, production crews had to pump in extra water. The film was mostly shot at Sony Pictures Studios in Culver City, California, while other filming locations included lava plains in Hawaii and Trona Pinnacles at Ridgecrest. To preserve secrecy, the shooting script did not include the ending. Fox considered using computer-generated imagery to create the apes, but Burton insisted on using prosthetic makeup designed by Rick Baker. Baker was previously involved with Adam Rifkin's and Oliver Stone's unproduced remakes. Burton commented, "I have a relationship with both of them (Winston and Baker), so that decision was hard," he says. "Stan worked on Edward Scissorhands and Baker did Martin Landau's makeup [as Béla Lugosi in Ed Wood]".

On his hiring, Baker explained, "[The original 1968 film] was such a landmark makeup picture, and I just had the hardest time turning it down. I'm a big makeup geek and a big ape geek, and I just thought, I really have to do this." Baker previously worked with designing ape makeup on King Kong, Greystoke: The Legend of Tarzan, Lord of the Apes, Gorillas in the Mist, and the 1998 remake of Mighty Joe Young. The makeup took ranged from 2 to 4 & 1/2 hours to apply and an hour to remove. Burton explained, "it's like going to the dentist at two in the morning and having people poke at you for hours. Then you wear an ape costume until nine at night." Burton was adamant that the apes should be substantially "more animal-like; flying through trees, climb walls, swing out of windows, and go ape shit when angry." For a month and a half before shooting started, the actors who portrayed apes attended "ape school" under the choreography of Terry Notary. Industrial Light & Magic (ILM), Rhythm & Hues Studios (R&H) and Animal Logic were commissioned for the visual effects sequences. Rick Heinrichs served as the production designer and Colleen Atwood did costume design. The helmets from Starship Troopers were reused for the gorilla SWAT team in the final scene.

To compose the film score, Burton hired regular collaborator Danny Elfman, who had previously been set as composer when Adam Rifkin was attached to do his own remake of the original back in 1989 before various filmmakers, including but eventually Burton himself, were attempted to do so later on. Elfman noted that his work on Planet of the Apes contained more percussion instruments than usual.

During filming, Roth held a grudge against Heston due to the latter's work with the National Rifle Association: "It was very difficult for me. On one level, there's the man and he's my [character's] dad. But on the other level, the whole NRA thing is what it is now. I'm so against it, very vocally so. But it was inappropriate for the workplace. If I'm going to talk to him, I'll talk to him outside the workplace. So it was just two guys in makeup doing a scene." Roth later claimed he would not have appeared in the film had he known he would be sharing a scene with Heston.

== Reception ==
=== Box office ===
Hasbro released a toy line, while Dark Horse Comics published a comic book adaptation. The original release date for the film was July 4, 2001. Planet of the Apes was released on July 27, 2001, in 3,500 theaters across the United States and Canada, the highest number of locations for a 20th Century Fox film, but ranking behind Mission: Impossible 2 and Shrek as the third-widest release. The film grossed $25 million on its opening day, the highest for a Friday, beating The Mummy Returns. For its opening weekend, it would go on to rank number one above Jurassic Park III and America's Sweethearts, collecting a non-holiday record gross of $68,532,960. This was the second-highest opening weekend of 2001, after Harry Potter and the Sorcerer's Stone. The film also dethroned Star Wars: Episode I – The Phantom Menace to score 20th Century Fox's biggest opening in history. At that point, it had the second-highest opening weekend of any film, behind The Lost World: Jurassic Park. Following The Mummy Returns, it was the second film of the year to cross the $60 million mark during its first three days, a feat that was later achieved by Monsters, Inc. and Rush Hour 2. Along with the latter film, American Pie 2 and Jurassic Park III, Planet of the Apes was among of the first four consecutive films to generate $45 million in their opening weekends. Upon its debut, it beat X-Men's record for having the largest July opening weekend. The film held that record until Austin Powers in Goldmember took it in 2002. It also achieved the record for generating the highest non-sequel July opening weekend, which was held until 2007 when it was overtaken by Transformers. Additionally, the film surpassed Batman Returns and The Perfect Storm for scoring the biggest opening weekend for a Tim Burton film and a Mark Wahlberg film respectively. The Tim Burton record would be maintained for less than a decade until it was surpassed by Alice in Wonderland in 2010. In its second weekend, the film made a total of $28.5 million.

Meanwhile, Planet of the Apes began to expand to Asian countries. While the film was unable to take the top chart spot from Hayao Miyazaki's Spirited Away, its opening was still a strong start to the company's international roll-out in one of the most significant international territories. Plus, it had a record opening in Brazil. It took in $1.5 million from 366 screens, beating the previous record held by Independence Day. In the UK, the film made $7.8 million during its opening weekend, reaching the number one spot above Cats & Dogs. The film had the fourth-highest opening weekend for a 2001 film at the time, only behind The Mummy Returns, Hannibal and Bridget Jones's Diary. In its second weekend, it collected $2.1 million and outgrossed newcomer Heartbreakers. It fell into second place behind A Knight's Tale during its third weekend, earning $1.7 million. In Mexico, Planet of the Apes earned $3.1 million from 547 screens, making it the second-highest opening in the country, after Dinosaur. The film grossed $180,011,740 in the United States and Canada and $182,200,000 elsewhere, for a worldwide total of $362,211,740. Planet of the Apes was the tenth-highest-grossing film in North America, and ninth-highest worldwide, of 2001.

=== Project APE ===
To help promote the release of Planet of the Apes, 20th Century Fox collaborated with Geocaching and released an internet marketing campaign nicknamed "Project APE", that involved people going out into the real world. Geocaching was barely a year old at the time, and was just beginning to become more well known. The promotion's backstory, which actually had no connection to the movie, was that a group of renegade humans were placing artefacts (geocaches) around the globe in an effort to reveal an Alternate Primate Evolution. Over the course of several weeks in 2001, a cache containing props and memorabilia from the movie (prop blindfolds, prop knives, posters, trading cards and more) was released every week. However, the cache's location was not given, but clues were given throughout the week that narrowed down the location until the cache's coordinates were released on a Friday. It was then a race to get to the cache, with the first person arriving at the location getting a pick of the goodies in the cache. The caches were large ammo boxes, with "Project APE" spray painted on the front. Fourteen caches were placed in a series of missions numbered 1–12 (one was "Special Movie" for the movie premiere in New York and there was a Mission 10a & 10b, with 10b being another cache with the London premiere tickets). Evidence points to a potential Mission 13, but no cache page has been found for it. Most of the caches did not last beyond a couple of finds, as most of them were muggled (stolen). Only two caches were active in 2021, with one located outside of Seattle, Washington, and the other in Brazil.

=== Critical response ===
On review aggregation website Rotten Tomatoes, Planet of the Apes has an approval rating of 42% based on 201 reviews, with an average rating of 5.7/10. The site's critical consensus reads, "This remake of Planet of the Apes can't compare to the original in some critics' minds, but the striking visuals and B-movie charms may win you over." On Metacritic the film has an average score of 50 out of 100, based on 34 critics, indicating "mixed or average reviews". Audiences polled by CinemaScore gave the film an average grade of "B−" on an A+ to F scale.

Roger Ebert of the Chicago Sun-Times gave the film 2½ stars. He praised the twist ending, but felt the film lacked a balanced story structure.

The movie is great-looking. Rick Baker's makeup is convincing even in the extreme closeups, and his apes sparkle with personality and presence. The sets and locations give us a proper sense of alien awe. Tim Burton made a film that's respectful to the original, and respectable in itself, but that's not enough. Ten years from now, it will be the 1968 version that people are still renting.

Peter Travers of Rolling Stone gave a negative review. "Call it a letdown, worsened by the forces of shoddy screenwriting. To quote Heston in both films, 'Damn them, damn them all'." Kenneth Turan of the Los Angeles Times believed "the actors in the nonhuman roles are mostly too buried by makeup to make strong impressions. Unfortunately, none of the good work counts as much as you'd think it would," Turan said. "Planet of the Apes shows that taking material too seriously can be as much of a handicap as not taking it seriously at all." Elvis Mitchell of The New York Times gave a more favorable review, feeling the script was balanced and the film served its purpose as "pure entertainment". In a three-and-a-half out of four review, Bruce R. Miller of Sioux City Journal stated that "Burton needed to throw away more than a few conventions to justify a second look. Instead, he settles for Crouching Tiger choreography and sets that recall everything else he has made." Jack Mathews of New York Daily News gave it a two-and-a-half out of five review, explaining that "it's a toy-store attraction, with an impressive line of lifelike primates, and though these hirsute creatures think and talk, they don't think or talk about much of importance." Susan Wloszczyna of USA Today enjoyed Planet of the Apes, feeling most of the credit should go to prosthetic makeup designer Rick Baker.

Much criticism was leveled against the ambiguous ending. Tim Roth, who portrayed General Thade, said "I cannot explain that ending. I have seen it twice and I don't understand anything." Helena Bonham Carter, who played Ari, said, "I thought it made sense, kind of. I don't understand why everyone went, 'Huh?' It's all a time warp thing. He's gone back and he realizes Thade's beat him there." Although the ending was ambiguous, it was closer to the ending of the actual Pierre Boulle book than was the ending of the 1968 Charlton Heston movie version. In the first of two twist endings of the Pierre Boulle book, the astronaut escapes back to planet Earth, only to be greeted by a gorilla in a jeep on the landing strip. Burton claimed the ending was not supposed to make any sense, but it was more of a cliffhanger to be explained in a possible sequel. "It was a reasonable cliffhanger that could be used in case Fox or another filmmaker wanted to do another movie," he explained. In 2011, Mark Wahlberg attributes the "failure" of the film to reboot the franchise to the studio's desire to crank out the movie before it was ready: "They didn't have the script right. They had a release date before he had shot a foot of film. They were pushing him and pushing him in the wrong direction. You have got to let Tim do his thing."

Roth (Supporting Actor), Bonham Carter (Supporting Actress), Colleen Atwood (Costume), and Rick Baker (Make-up) received nominations at the Saturn Awards. Atwood and Baker were nominated at the 55th British Academy Film Awards, while music composer Danny Elfman was nominated for his work at the 43rd Grammy Awards. At the 22nd Golden Raspberry Awards, Planet of the Apes won all three of its awards it was nominated for, Worst Remake, Worst Supporting Actor for Charlton Heston (tied with Cats & Dogs and Town & Country) and Worst Supporting Actress for Estella Warren (tied with Driven). At the 2001 Stinkers Bad Movie Awards, the film received nominations for Worst Director (Burton), Worst Supporting Actress (Warren), and Worst Screenplay for a Film Grossing Over $100M Worldwide Using Hollywood Math, but it failed to win any of those.

== Future ==
=== Cancelled sequel ===
Fox stated that if Planet of the Apes was a financial success, then a sequel would be commissioned. When asked whether he would be interested in working on a follow-up, director Tim Burton replied, "I'd rather jump out a window." Mark Wahlberg and Helena Bonham Carter would have returned if Burton had decided to make another Apes film. Paul Giamatti had been interested in reprising his role. "I think it'd be great to have apes driving cars, smoking cigars," Giamatti said. "Wearing glasses, sitting in a board room, stuff like that." Planet of the Apes was the last film Burton worked on with his then fiancée Lisa Marie. After their break up, Burton started a relationship with Bonham Carter, who portrayed Ari. Planet of the Apes was also Burton's first collaboration with producer Richard D. Zanuck.

=== Reboot ===
Fox returned to the franchise in 2011 with Rise of the Planet of the Apes, a reboot of the series that led to its own sequels.

== Video game ==
In 1998, after 20th Century Fox had greenlit James Cameron's version of the film remake, the company's video game division, Fox Interactive, started planning a video game tie-in. The film project went on hold when Cameron pulled out, but Fox Interactive remained confident a remake would progress eventually and continued with the game. Fox contracted French company Visiware as developer; with the film on hold, the creators developed their own story inspired by Boulle's novel and the original films. The game is an action-adventure in which the player controls astronaut Ulysses after he crashes on the Planet of the Apes. It was developed for PC and PlayStation.

The game experienced serious delays due to setbacks with the film project and Fox Interactive's decision to co-publish with a third party. Despite its long development, it missed the debut of Burton's film. Fox Interactive and co-publisher Ubisoft finally released the PC version on September 20, 2001; the PlayStation version followed on August 22, 2002. The game received mostly negative reviews.

Additionally, Ubisoft and developer Torus Games produced a substantially different Planet of the Apes game for Game Boy Advance and Game Boy Color. It is a side-scroller following the first two films; the player controls astronaut Ben on the Planet of the Apes. The Game Boy versions received average reviews.

== Home media ==
Planet of the Apes was released on DVD and VHS on November 20, 2001. DVD rentals grossed $40.8 million in the United States, as of December 2001. This THX certified two-disc DVD release features rare Nuon technology, which can only be used on Nuon-enhanced DVD players. These Nuon features include viddies and various zoom points during the film. The first disc features audio commentaries with Tim Burton and Danny Elfman, cast and crew profiles and enhanced viewing mode. It also contains a DTS 5.1 audio track and DVD-ROM. On the second disc, there are extended scenes, an HBO special called The Making of Planet of the Apes, behind-the-scenes footage, theatrical trailers, TV spots, previews for Moulin Rouge! and Dr. Dolittle 2, posters and press kit, a music promo, screen tests, galleries, multi-angle featurettes and more.

The film premiered on Blu-ray on February 13, 2007.
