= Romancing the Stone =

1984 film by Robert Zemeckis

- Theatrical release poster by John Solie
- Directed by: Robert Zemeckis
- Written by: Diane Thomas
- Produced by: Michael Douglas
- Starring: Michael Douglas; Kathleen Turner; Danny DeVito; Alfonso Arau; Manuel Ojeda
- Cinematography: Dean Cundey
- Edited by: Donn Cambern; Frank Morriss
- Music by: Alan Silvestri
- Production company: El Corazon Producciones S.A.
- Distributed by: 20th Century Fox
- Release dates: March 30, 1984 (United States); September 14, 1984 (Mexico)
- Running time: 106 minutes
- Countries: Mexico; United States
- Language: English
- Budget: $10 million
- Box office: $115.1 million

Romancing the Stone is a 1984 romantic comedy-adventure film directed by Robert Zemeckis, written by Diane Thomas and produced by Michael Douglas, who also stars in the film alongside Kathleen Turner and Danny DeVito. The film follows a romance novelist who must venture beyond her New York City comfort zone to Colombia to save her widowed sister from criminals who are holding her for ransom.

Thomas wrote the screenplay in 1979. Zemeckis, who at the time was developing Cocoon, liked Thomas's screenplay and offered to direct but 20th Century Fox initially declined, citing the commercial failure of his first two films I Wanna Hold Your Hand and Used Cars. Zemeckis was eventually dismissed from Cocoon after an early screening of Romancing the Stone failed to impress studio executives further. Alan Silvestri, who would collaborate with Zemeckis on his later films, composed the score.

Romancing the Stone was released on March 30, 1984, to positive reviews from critics and earned over $115 million worldwide at the box office. A sequel, The Jewel of the Nile, was released the following year.

== Plot ==
Joan Wilder is a successful but lonely romance novelist living in a New York apartment with her cat, Romeo. As Joan leaves to meet her editor and friend Gloria Horne, her neighbor hands her an envelope containing a map, sent by her recently murdered brother-in-law, Eduardo. While she is gone, a man breaks into her apartment and kills the building's superintendent when caught in the act. Returning to her apartment, Joan finds it ransacked and receives a phone call from her sister Elaine, Eduardo's widow. Elaine has been kidnapped by antiquities smugglers, cousins Ira and Ralph, and instructs Joan to bring the map to the Colombian coastal city of Cartagena; it is Elaine's ransom.

Flying to Colombia, Joan is diverted from the bus to Cartagena by Colonel Zolo, the man who killed Eduardo and ransacked her apartment. Instead of heading to Cartagena, this bus goes deep into the country's interior. Ralph realizes this and begins following Joan. When Joan distracts the bus driver by asking where they are going, the bus crashes into a Land Rover, wrecking both vehicles. As the rest of the passengers walk away, Joan is held at gunpoint by Zolo but is saved by the Land Rover's owner, an American exotic bird smuggler named Jack T. Colton following a shootout between him and Zolo.

Joan promises to pay Jack $375 in traveler's cheques for getting her out of the jungle and to a telephone. The two of them travel the jungle while eluding Zolo and his military police. Reaching a small village, they encounter a drug lord named Juan who is a big fan of Joan's novels and happily helps them escape from Zolo’s soldiers.

After a night of dancing and passion in a nearby town, Jack suggests to Joan that they find the treasure themselves before handing over the map. Zolo's men enter the town, so Jack and Joan steal a car to escape; but it is Ralph's car, and he is sleeping in the back. They follow the clues and retrieve the treasure, an enormous emerald called El Corazón ("The Heart"). Ralph takes the emerald from them at gunpoint, but Zolo's forces appear, distracting Ralph long enough for Jack to steal the jewel back. After being chased into a river and over a waterfall, Jack and Joan are separated on opposite sides of the raging river. Joan has the map, but Jack has the emerald. Jack directs Joan to Cartagena, promising that he will meet her there.

In Cartagena, Joan meets with Ira, who takes the map and lets Elaine go. But Zolo and his men arrive, with a captured Jack and a severely beaten Ralph. As Zolo attempts to torture Joan, Jack tries to kick the emerald into a crocodile pool behind Zolo. Zolo catches the emerald, but then a crocodile jumps up and bites his hand off, swallowing the emerald with it. A brief gunfight ensues between Zolo's soldiers and Ira’s men just as Ira and Ralph run for cover. Joan and Elaine dash for safety, just as the maimed Zolo gives chase, while Jack tries to stop the crocodile from escaping, but begrudgingly releases it to try to save Joan.

A crazed Zolo charges at Joan; she dodges his wild knife slashes, and he falls through a trap door into a crocodile pit to his death. As the authorities arrive, Ira and his men escape, but Ralph is left behind. After a kiss, Jack dives into the water after the crocodile with the emerald, leaving Joan behind with her sister.

Some time later, Joan is back in New York City and has written a new novel based on her adventure. Gloria is moved to tears by the story and tells Joan she has another best-seller on her hands. Returning home, she finds Jack waiting for her in a sailboat named the Angelina, after the heroine of Joan's novels, and wearing boots made from the crocodile's skin. He jokes that the crocodile got "a fatal case of indigestion" from the emerald, which he sold, using the money to buy the boat of his dreams. They go off together, planning to sail around the world.

== Cast ==
- Michael Douglas as Jack T. Colton – A brash, rugged American bird hunter living in Colombia who assists Joan in her adventure. He hopes to save money for a sailboat and leave Colombia to travel the world.
- Kathleen Turner as Joan Wilder – A successful but lonely romance novelist from New York City. She longs to meet and fall in love with a man resembling the heroic male characters from her writing.
- Danny DeVito as Ralph – An antiquities smuggler from Queens who takes Joan's sister hostage and pursues Colton and Wilder through the jungle, hoping to acquire the map.
- Zack Norman as Ira – Ralph's cousin and partner in crime. He has an affinity for crocodiles.
- Alfonso Arau as Juan – "The Bellmaker", a man implied to be a drug smuggler who happens to be a huge fan of Joan's work. He helps Colton and Wilder escape from Zolo's forces.
- Manuel Ojeda as Colonel Zolo – Elaine's husband's killer and heartless Deputy Commander of the secret police. After failing to obtain the map from Joan in New York, he follows her to Colombia in pursuit.
- Holland Taylor as Gloria Horne – Joan's friend and publisher.
- Mary Ellen Trainor as Elaine Wilder – Joan's widowed sister
- Eve Smith as Mrs. Irwin
- Joe Nesnow as Super
- José Chávez as Santos
- Evita Muñoz as Hefty Woman
- Camillo García as Bus Driver
- Rodrigo Puebla as Bad Hombre
- Paco Morayta as Hotel Clerk
- Kymberly Herrin as Angelina
- Bill Burton as Jesse Gerrard
- Ted White as Grogan

== Production ==
=== Screenplay ===
The screenplay was written five years earlier by Malibu waitress Diane Thomas in what would end up being her only screenplay made into a movie. She died in a car crash a year and a half after the film's release. Jack Brodsky and Michael Douglas purchased the rights to her screenplay as their studio Bigstick Productions' first project under a contract with Columbia Pictures in 1979. However, Douglas could not get the film cast before his deal with Columbia expired in 1983. 20th Century Fox agreed to purchase the rights to the film from Columbia after the success of Raiders of the Lost Ark (1981). Robert Zemeckis was hired as director because of his association with that film's director Steven Spielberg.

=== Casting ===
Douglas initially intended only to produce the film, as he had recently appeared in a series of box-office bombs. Burt Reynolds and Clint Eastwood were considered for the role of Jack T. Colton while the film was at Columbia but declined. Other leads considered include Sylvester Stallone, Paul Newman, and Christopher Reeve for the part of Jack Colton before Douglas hired himself and Debra Winger was the studio's top choice for Joan Wilder. Many of the male stars offered the role of Colton had been displeased that the female character Wilder was the protagonist while Colton was a secondary. After Michael Douglas agreed to star in the film, the early producers (Bigstick Productions) transferred the project to his company, El Corazon Productions. Douglas then set up a "negative pick-up" deal with 20th Century Fox, meaning his company would finance the production independently and the studio would buy it once it was finished.

=== Filming ===
Principal photography on the film began on July 11, 1983. It took place in both the United States and Mexico. Filming locations included Veracruz (Fort of San Juan de Ulúa), Huasca de Ocampo, Xalapa, El Arenal, Tonaya, Xico, Barraca Grande, the Valle de Silencio, New York City, and Snow Canyon, Utah. Interior filming was conducted in Mexico City, while the opening scene was filmed in St. George, Utah. The scene where Turner and Douglas get separated on opposite banks on a whitewater river was filmed on the Rio Antigua near the town of Jalcomulco, Veracruz. Production went behind schedule due to the complicated stunts of the film and numerous hazardous storms, although 20th Century Fox pressured the filmmakers to complete the film as soon as possible to avoid competition with Indiana Jones and the Temple of Doom (1984).

Turner later said of the film's production, "I remember terrible arguments [with Robert Zemeckis] doing Romancing. He's a film-school grad, fascinated by cameras and effects. I never felt that he knew what I was having to do to adjust my acting to some of his damn cameras – sometimes he puts you in ridiculous postures. I'd say, 'This is not helping me! This is not the way I like to work, thank you!'" After production completed, Turner sued the filmmakers to pay for plastic surgery for injuries sustained during shooting. Zemeckis would go on to work with Turner again, casting her as the voice of Jessica Rabbit in 1988's Who Framed Roger Rabbit.

== Reception ==
=== Box office ===
Studio insiders expected Romancing the Stone to flop to the point that, after viewing a rough cut of the film, the producers of the then-under-development Cocoon fired Zemeckis as director of that film. However, it became a surprise hit and 20th Century Fox's only big hit of 1984. The film eventually grossed over US$115 million worldwide, becoming the sixth-highest-grossing film of 1984. Zemeckis later stated that the success of Romancing the Stone allowed him to make Back to the Future (1985).

=== Critical response ===
The film received positive reviews upon release. On the review aggregator website Rotten Tomatoes, 86% of 56 critics' reviews are positive, with an average rating of 7.2/10. The website's consensus reads: "Romancing the Stone reaches back to the classic Saturday morning serials of old with an action-filled adventure enlivened by the sparkling chemistry between its well-matched leads." Metacritic, which uses a weighted average, assigned the film a score of 63 out of 100, based on 17 critics, indicating "generally favorable" reviews.

Upon the release of Romancing the Stone, Time magazine called the film "a distaff Raiders rip-off". The Washington Post remarked that "Though fitfully thrilling and amusing, [Joan Wilder's] adventures degenerate into a muddle. Neither screenwriter Diane Thomas nor director Robert Zemeckis, good-humored as they strive to be, maintains a coherent perception of how the plot should be contrived to trump the heroine's overactive fantasy life." They elaborated that the stone makes an uncompelling MacGuffin, Joan's character development is incongruous and ultimately unsatisfying, and Joan and Jack lack romantic chemistry. By contrast, Time Out commented that "The script is sharp and funny, the direction sure-footed on both the comedy and action fronts", and compared the film favorably to its contemporary in the same genre, Indiana Jones and the Temple of Doom (1984). Roger Ebert called it "a silly, high-spirited chase picture", saying he greatly enjoyed the film's imaginative perils, colorful cast of villains, and believable relationship between its two lead characters. He likewise compared it favorably to other Raiders of the Lost Ark clones.

Colin Greenland reviewed Romancing the Stone for Imagine magazine, and stated that "Good-humoured, sparky stuff in the manner of Raiders of the Lost Ark."

Filmsite.org included it as one of the best films of 1984, and Entertainment Weekly included it on its list of films that made 1984 one of the best years for Hollywood films.

Then–U.S. President Ronald Reagan watched the film at Camp David in May 1984.

=== Awards ===
Award wins:

- Golden Globe Award for Best Motion Picture – Musical or Comedy
- Golden Globe Award for Best Actress – Musical or Comedy – Kathleen Turner
- Los Angeles Film Critics Association Award for Best Actress – Kathleen Turner
- Golden Reel Award for Best Sound Editing – ADR
- Stuntman Award for Most Spectacular Stunt – Vince Deadrick Jr., Terry Leonard

Award nominations:

- Academy Award for Best Film Editing – Donn Cambern, Frank Morriss
- American Cinema Editors Award for Best Edited Feature Film – Donn Cambern, Frank Morriss
- Writers Guild of America Award for Best Original Screenplay – Diane Thomas

== In other media ==
=== Books ===
The novelization of Romancing the Stone was written by Catherine Lanigan under "Joan Wilder" as a pen name, along with a novelization of the sequel movie The Jewel of the Nile.

== Sequels ==
The success of Romancing the Stone led to a sequel, The Jewel of the Nile, without Zemeckis directing but with Douglas, Turner, and DeVito all returning. The film was released in December 1985 and was commercially successful, but received weaker reviews than the first.

Since 1985, numerous attempts have been made to produce further sequels to the film. Another sequel, called The Crimson Eagle, would have had Jack and Joan take their two teenage children to Thailand, where they are blackmailed into stealing a priceless statue. Filming was scheduled to begin in 1987, following Michael Douglas's shooting of Wall Street, but the production was delayed and ultimately never made it past the development stage. DeVito reunited Douglas, Turner, and himself in his 1989 film The War of the Roses.

In 2005 and again in 2008, Douglas was developing a second sequel, tentatively titled Racing the Monsoon.

Since 2007, 20th Century Fox has considered producing a remake of Romancing the Stone, with the possibility of a reboot series. The roles of Jack Colton and Joan Wilder would be filled by Taylor Kitsch (or Gerard Butler) and Katherine Heigl, respectively. By 2011, the remake was re-worked as a television series.

== See also ==
- High Risk (1981)
- Green Ice (1981)
- Florida Straits (1986)
- The Lost City (2022)
