= For Love or Money (1993 film) =

1993 film by Barry Sonnenfeld

- Theatrical release poster
- Directed by: Barry Sonnenfeld
- Written by: Mark Rosenthal; Lawrence Konner
- Produced by: Brian Grazer
- Starring: Michael J. Fox; Gabrielle Anwar; Anthony Higgins; Bob Balaban; Michael Tucker
- Cinematography: Oliver Wood
- Edited by: Jim Miller
- Music by: Bruce Broughton
- Production company: Imagine Films Entertainment
- Distributed by: Universal Pictures
- Release date: October 1, 1993
- Running time: 96 minutes
- Country: United States
- Language: English
- Budget: $30 million
- Box office: $11.1 million

For Love or Money (also released as The Concierge) is a 1993 American romantic comedy film directed by Barry Sonnenfeld and starring Michael J. Fox and Gabrielle Anwar.

In the film, a concierge has invested his savings into obtaining his own hotel, but needs additional financing to begin development. He is offered financial assistance by a wealthy guest, in exchange of taking care of the friend's neglected mistress. The concierge was already attracted to the woman before making this deal, and he starts developing genuine feelings from her. Meanwhile, he finds out that his wealthy friend is planning to betray him and to take over the ownership of the hotel.

For Love or Money was released by Universal Pictures on October 1, 1993. The film received mixed reviews from critics and was a box office bomb, grossing $11.1 million against a $30 million budget.

== Plot ==
Doug Ireland is a concierge at the Bradbury, a luxurious hotel in New York City. Doug is very well-connected and is very good at his job, giving personal attention to guests like Gene Salvatore while occasionally pocketing a big tip. He also helps people who don't tip as well, such as Harry Wegman. Doug's dream is to open his own hotel on Roosevelt Island. He has saved every cent and obtained an option on an old hotel. But he only has a few weeks to begin development and needs at least $3 million immediately to start or the development goes back to the city.

Doug's best chance is Christian Hanover, a somewhat unscrupulous billionaire. Christian considers the proposal and asks Doug to "take care" of his mistress, Andy Hart, a perfume saleswoman. Christian has been leading Andy on, making her believe that he was divorcing his wife. Doug had been flirting with Andy before he knew she was seeing Christian, and had asked her out multiple times. However, she always stated that she had a boyfriend. Doug spends time with Andy when Christian neglects her, (as a “favor” for Christian) and he saves Andy and Christian from an embarrassing scene at a party in Christian's house with his wife, Elenor.

Doug learns that Christian is deceiving Andy about getting a divorce, stating, “you don’t divorce your third wife”. But because his hotel proposal is urgent and Andy is old enough to make her own decisions, he doesn't intervene. However, as he and Andy spend time together, he develops feelings for her, going to an elegant restaurant with her after Christian is late due to a date with his wife. He simultaneously helps Wegman with his failing marriage, helping him get his wife to love him again. Afterwards, Andy and Doug get into a heated argument in Christian's hotel suite.

Andy then learns that a document Christian asked Doug to sign, was intended to permit the billionaire to take over the hotel project and force Doug out. Christian reveals that an IRS agent who was tailing Doug about the real estate property he (Doug) bought until he (Christian) and his lawyers took care of it was actually working with Christian to get the property. Christian smugly tells Andy that the project was going to make a fortune and he wasn't going to share it with a mere concierge. Andy abandons him to warn Doug, who is chasing after her to tell her Christian isn't divorcing his wife. After the two reunite at the Queensboro Bridge and reveal to each other about the deception, Doug says he never signed the document due to leaving to warn Andy, so Christian can't take over the property.

In the end, after Doug and Andy marry, he gets a call from Wegman, who despite his frugalness is a successful financier. Wegman has accidentally been sent Doug's business plan by a veteran member of the hotel staff Doug refused to fire, and has decided to put up the $3 million that Doug needs.

== Cast ==
- Michael J. Fox as Doug Ireland
- Gabrielle Anwar as Andy Hart
- Anthony Higgins as Christian Hanover
- Bob Balaban as Ed Drinkwater
- Michael Tucker as Mr. Harry Wegman
- Udo Kier as Mr. Himmelman
- Dan Hedaya as Gene Salvatore
- Patrick Breen as Gary Taubin
- Isaac Mizrahi as Julian Russell
- Fyvush Finkel as Milton Glickman
- Goodfella Mike G. (as Mike G.) as Charlie the Doorman
- Saverio Guerra as Carmen
- Daniel Hagen as Vincent, Bartender
- LaChanze as Nora
- Paula Laurence as Mrs. Jeanette Vigusian
- Donna Mitchell as Eleanor Hanover
- Susan Blommaert as Charlotte
- Debra Monk as Mrs. Wegman
- Harry Bugin as Joey Pickles

== Reception ==
On the review aggregator website Rotten Tomatoes, 41% of 17 critics' reviews are positive, with an average rating of 4.6/10. Metacritic, which uses a weighted average, assigned the film a score of 42 out of 100, based on 20 critics, indicating "mixed or average" reviews.

Roger Ebert of the Chicago Sun-Times awarded the film two out of four stars and described it as "the kind of movie where you walk in, sit down, and start thinking this is where you came in." Gene Siskel of the Chicago Tribune awarded the film two and a half out of four stars and stated that the film was "a solid setup for a good story, but For Love or Money doesn't have one to tell."

It was not a commercial success domestically in North America, earning less than half its production budget before being withdrawn from theaters after just four weeks of release.
