= Shauna Barbosa =

American poet

Shauna Barbosa (born ca. 1988) is the author of the poetry collection Cape Verdean Blues (University of Pittsburgh Press, 2018). She was a finalist for PEN America's 2019 Open Book Award and was a 2018 Disquiet International Luso-American fellow.

== Early life ==
Barbosa was born to an African-American mother and Cape Verdean father, and grew up in Roxbury, Boston, Massachusetts. Her parents met working at Polaroid. She has four siblings.

At age 15, she worked at the Funky Fresh music store in Boston, which fostered her love of music and mixtapes. In high school, she reviewed albums for her school paper. Later, she worked as an intern at Vibe.

== Life and work ==
Barbosa received her MFA from Bennington College in Vermont and currently resides in Los Angeles, California where she teaches Creative Writing in the Writers’ Program at UCLA Extension. Her poems have appeared or are forthcoming in The New Yorker, Ploughshares, AGNI, Iowa Review, Virginia Quarterly Review, Boulevard, Poetry Society of America, PBS NewsHour, Lit Hub, Lenny Letter, and others.

She cites the writers Camonghne Felix, Lucille Clifton, Ariana Reines, Patricia Smith, Dean Young, Anne Sexton, Michael Ondaatje, Jorge Barbosa, and Corsino Fortes as inspiration, as well as the lyrics of Juvenile, Nas, Frank Ocean, Amy Winehouse and Andre 3000.

=== Cape Verdean Blues ===
Barbosa's poetry collection Cape Verdean Blues was published in 2018. In their review, Publishers Weekly said, "In her strong debut, Barbosa delves into how the nuances of identity are formed through intersecting struggles. She characterizes identity as mutable, flexible, and a means to keep the memories that shape a person. Writing of her Cape Verdean upbringing in Boston, Barbosa investigates what it means to be a woman of color and a cultural other."

Kendrick Lamar praised the book, saying, "These words feel like experiences. Some are personal, most are enlightening, but all connect. Connect on a higher level. A spiritual level."

Lit Hub named it one of their favorite books of 2018.

The book is named after the jazz musician Horace Silver's 1966 album The Cape Verdean Blues.

Five poems translated into French were published in Europe in April 2020 ("Broke", "Deniz", "Strology Virgo", "Something African with a K", "And I Know That She Feels Beautiful - Do We Have Cancer").

== Bibliography ==
=== Poetry ===
Collections

- Cape Verdean Blues. University of Pittsburgh Press. 2018.

List of poems

| Title | Year | First published | Reprinted/collected |
|---|---|---|---|
| What is a diagnosis to a demon | 2020 | "What is a diagnosis to a demon". The New Yorker. 95 (44): 36. January 13, 2020. | |
| And I Know That She Feels Beautiful | | "And I Know That She Feels Beautiful". The Bad Penny Review | |
| 33 | | "33". The Bad Penny Review | |
| GPS | | "GPS". The Bad Penny Review | |
| Simone | | "Simone". Sundog Lit | |
| Deniz | 2014 | "Deniz". PANK. 9.6. June 2014 | |
| Your Eyes Blink Five-Minute Miles | | "Your Eyes Blink Five-Minute Miles". The Minnesota Review | |
| re the dentist and his new family | 2015 | "re the dentist and his new family". The Awl. April 30, 2015 | |
| Big Sun Coming Strong Through the Motel Blinds | 2016 | "Big Sun Coming Strong Through the Motel Blinds". No Tokens Journal. August 30, 2016 | |
| Tone's Posture | | "Tone's Posture". Some Mark Made | |
| Flush Past the Ferry | | "Flush Past the Ferry". Some Mark Made | |
| Self on the First Date | | "Self on the First Date". The Atlas Review | City of Notions: An Anthology of Contemporary Boston Poets |
| When I Say I Want a Baby | 2016 | "When I Say I Want a Baby". The Colorado Review | |
| Let | | "Let". Boulevard Magazine | featured in the Mass Poetry Raining Poetry Project as well as displayed at Boston City Hall as part of the Mayor's Office of Arts + Culture Initiative (2016-2017) |
| Broke | | "Broke". Boulevard Magazine | |
| Something African With a K | | "Something African With a K". RHINO Poetry | |
| Liberation | 2017 | "Liberation". Virginia Quarterly Review. Summer 2017 | Poetry Daily in 2018 |
| Strology Taurus | 2017 | "Strology Taurus". Lenny Letter. December 26, 2017 | Cape Verdean Blues |
| Strology Scorpio | 2017 | "Strology Scorpio". Lenny Letter. December 26, 2017 | Cape Verdean Blues |
| Every Year Trying to Get My Body Right | 2017 | "Every Year Trying to Get My Body Right". Lenny Letter. December 26, 2017 | Cape Verdean Blues |
| Strology Aries | | "Strology Aries". Foundry | Cape Verdean Blues |
| To the Brothers of Cesária Évora | 2018 | "To the Brothers of Cesária Évora". Lit Hub. March 12, 2018 | Cape Verdean Blues |
| This Won't Make Sense in English lénsu-marra | 2018 | "This Won’t Make Sense in English lénsu-marra" Lit Hub. March 12, 2018 | Cape Verdean Blues |
| Strology Gemini | 2018 | "Strology Gemini". Lit Hub. March 12, 2018 | Cape Verdean Blues |
| Small Town & Terrifying | 2018 | "Small Town & Terrifying". Lit Hub. March 12, 2018 | Cape Verdean Blues |
| The Genetics of Leaving | 2018 | "The Genetics of Leaving". PBS. March 12, 2018 | Cape Verdean Blues |
| Strology Virgo | | "Strology Virgo". WILDNESS | Cape Verdean Blues |
| Strology Capricorn | | "Strology Capricorn". WILDNESS | Cape Verdean Blues |
| You Will, Indeed, Always Be the Same Person After Vacation | | "You Will, Indeed, Always Be the Same Person After Vacation". Tupelo Quarterly | |
| Taking Over for the '99 and the 2000 | | "Taking Over for the '99 and the 2000". Poetry Society of America | |
| Dancing Makes Me Desperate | | "Dancing Makes Me Desperate". The Southeast Review | |
| Not Crazy Just Afraid to Ask | 2019 | "Not Crazy Just Afraid to Ask". Iowa Review. April 15, 2019 | |
| Blossom | 2019 | "Blossom". Iowa Review. April 15, 2019 | |
| WhatsApp Message Analysis and Response | | "WhatsApp Message Analysis and Response". AGNI | |
| The Internet | | "The Internet". Ploughshares | |
| Aloe | | "Aloe". Redivider | |
| I Look at Everyone Like This | | "I Look at Everyone Like This". Redivider | |
| It's Raining in LA What Else I'm Pose to Do | | "It's Raining in LA What Else I'm Pose to Do". THE COMMON | |
