= The In Crowd (1988 film) =

1988 film by Mark Rosenthal

- VHS cover
- Directed by: Mark Rosenthal
- Written by: Lawrence Konner; Mark Rosenthal
- Produced by: Keith Rubinstein; Lawrence Konner
- Starring: Donovan Leitch; Joe Pantoliano
- Cinematography: Anthony B. Richmond
- Edited by: Jeffrey Wolf
- Music by: Mark Snow
- Distributed by: Orion Pictures
- Release date: February 13, 1988
- Running time: 95 minutes
- Country: United States
- Language: English
- Box office: $124,880 (USA)

The In Crowd is a 1988 American teen drama film directed by Mark Rosenthal and written by Rosenthal and his long-time writing partner Lawrence Konner. The period piece set in the 1960s features music of the era, including "Land of a Thousand Dances" and the instrumental "Cast Your Fate to the Wind" by Vince Guaraldi.

== Plot ==
In the mid 1960s Philadelphia, Perry Parker is a local dance-show host who aspires to rival Dick Clark. Del Green is an honors student who dreams about dancing with Vicky, the show's most popular dancer who attends a parochial school. However Vicky is in love with her dancing partner Dugan.

Del sneaks to the sound stage right on the day when Dugan misses the show. Someone from the ‘In Crowd’, a group of show's featured dancers, needs to step up as Vicky’s partner, but the other boys are hesitating, knowing Dugan's bad temper. Del takes the chance and his first appearance with Vicky is a big hit. His school friends can’t believe that Del is so hip and ‘alive’ while dancing, but Del's next door neighbor and childhood friend Gail, who has a crush on Del, is not happy with his new acquaintances and considers them the 'wrong crowd' for him.

Del is accepted to the ‘In Crowd’ and Perry requires Del to attend their evening outing with Vicky. Del picks up Vicky at her home and her father Tiny, a policeman, is happy to see her with a smart college bound young man, a sharp contrast with Dugan who can barely read. However at the outing Vicky sneaks away with Dugan, and Del is waiting until she returns and takes her home to alleviate Tiny's suspicions. There are several more outings, but each time Vicky runs off with Dugan. Del feels used by Vicky and refuses to be a party to her secret romance. Eventually they make up, and Del learns that Vicky and Dugan plan to run off to Hollywood and become movie stars, and vows to help them.

Perry's show is cancelled and the ‘In Crowd’ give their last wild dance. Del then borrows a Cadillac from Gail's father so he can get Vicky out to meet up and leave with Dugan. Tiny tries to stop the couple and Del crashes into Tiny's police car, helping Vicky escape on Dugan’s motorcycle.

As a consequence, Del is grounded in his room. Gail comes by to play a new kind of music - rock music. She wears a leather headband, mini-skirt and high top suede boots. Del is stunned by her new appearance. She's holding Bob Dylan's "Highway 61 Revisited" album. Gail puts the LP on a turntable and plays the first song on side 1: "Like A Rolling Stone".

== Cast ==
- Donovan Leitch as Del Green
- Joe Pantoliano as Perry Parker
- Peter Boyle as Uncle Pete Boyle
- Scott Plank as Dugan
- Jennifer Runyon as Vicky
- Bruce Kirby as Morris
- Wendy Gazelle as Gail
- Sean Gregory Sullivan as "Popeye"
- Charlotte d'Amboise as Ina
- Page Hannah as Lydia
- Mark Soper as Station Manager
- Freddie Ganno as Orson
- Richard Schave as Tucker
- Matthew Nasatir as Bernstein
- John R. Russell as Ming
- Elliott Alexander as Jack Goron

== Filming ==
The film was shot at various locations around Philadelphia and New Jersey in the summer of 1986. The Perry Parker Dance Show scenes were filmed in the auditorium at Temple University using local Philadelphia high school students as the kids in the audience. The celebratory dinner after the performance of The Mikado took place at Kona Kai, an iconic Philadelphia spot and important location in the history of American tiki culture, that closed permanently later that year. Though several television shows feature the exterior of Kona Kai, this is believed to be the only movie or TV show to have ever captured the interior. The beachside scenes were shot on location in Wildwood, NJ. The train stations featured are on the Chestnut Hill West and East lines of SEPTA (Southeastern Pennsylvania Transit Authority).
