= The Sorcerer's Apprentice (2010 film) =

Film by Jon Turteltaub

- Theatrical release poster
- Directed by: Jon Turteltaub
- Screenplay by: Doug Miro; Carlo Bernard; Matt Lopez
- Story by: Matt Lopez; Lawrence Konner; Mark Rosenthal
- Based on: "The Sorcerer's Apprentice" (Note: "The Sorcerer's Apprentice" segment from Fantasia (1940) is a visual presentation of Paul Dukas's 1897 symphonic poem The Sorcerer's Apprentice, itself an adaptation of Johann Wolfgang von Goethe's 1797 poem "The Sorcerer's Apprentice".) by Disney
- Produced by: Jerry Bruckheimer
- Starring: Nicolas Cage; Jay Baruchel; Alfred Molina; Teresa Palmer; Monica Bellucci
- Cinematography: Bojan Bazelli
- Edited by: William Goldenberg
- Music by: Trevor Rabin
- Production companies: Walt Disney Pictures; Jerry Bruckheimer Films; Saturn Films; Broken Road Productions
- Distributed by: Walt Disney Studios; Motion Pictures
- Release dates: July 8, 2010 (Fantasia); July 14, 2010 (United States)
- Running time: 109 minutes
- Country: United States
- Language: English
- Budget: $150 million
- Box office: $215.3 million

The Sorcerer's Apprentice is a 2010 American fantasy film produced by Walt Disney Pictures and starring Nicolas Cage and Jay Baruchel. Cage plays a sorcerer who recruits a physics student, portrayed by Baruchel, as his apprentice. The film is set primarily in New York City and follows the apprentice's involvement in a conflict between rival sorcerers. It is directed by Jon Turteltaub, from a screenplay by Matt Lopez and the writing team of Doug Miro and Carlo Bernard, and a screen story by Lopez, Lawrence Konner, and Mark Rosenthal. Alfred Molina, Teresa Palmer, and Monica Bellucci star in supporting roles.

Production companies Walt Disney Pictures, Jerry Bruckheimer Films, Saturn Films, and Broken Road Productions created the film. The story is adapted from a segment in the 1940 Disney film Fantasia, entitled "The Sorcerer's Apprentice", featuring Mickey Mouse (with one scene being an extensive reference to it), which in turn is based on the late-1890s symphonic poem by Paul Dukas, itself derived from the 1797 Johann Wolfgang von Goethe ballad.

The Sorcerer's Apprentice made its premiere at the Fantasia International Film Festival on July 8, 2010 and was theatrically released by Walt Disney Studios Motion Pictures in the United States on July 14. The film received mixed reviews from critics, and was a financial disappointment, grossing only $215.3 million against its $150 million budget.

== Plot ==
In 740 AD in England, Merlin has three apprentices: Balthazar Blake, Veronica Gorloisen, and Maxim Horvath. Horvath betrays Merlin by allying with Morgana le Fay, an evil sorceress trying to steal a spell called "The Rising," which will revive dead sorcerers and enslave mankind. Morgana mortally wounds Merlin, but Veronica absorbs Morgana's soul. As Morgana tries to kill Veronica from within, Balthazar stops her by imprisoning both in the "Grimhold", a magical nesting doll. Before dying, Merlin gives Balthazar a dragon figurine to identify the Prime Merlinean, his descendant who can defeat Morgana. Throughout history, Balthazar searches for Merlin's heir and confines Morganians, sorcerers who tried to free Morgana, including Horvath, in the Grimhold.

In 2000, 10-year-old Dave Stutler meets Balthazar in his Manhattan antique store. Balthazar gives him Merlin's dragon figurine, which transforms into a ring, revealing Dave as the Prime Merlinean. When Balthazar retrieves a book on magic, Dave accidentally opens the Grimhold, releasing Horvath. Balthazar and Horvath fight for the Grimhold and are imprisoned in an ancient Chinese urn under a ten-year curse while Dave escapes with the ring.

Ten years later, Dave is a physics student at NYU. The ten-year imprisonment curse of the urn ends, releasing both Horvath and Balthazar. Horvath pursues Dave and the Grimhold. Balthazar rescues Dave, riding an animated steel eagle adapted from a Chrysler Building gargoyle. Dave refuses to help Balthazar, having been under psychiatric care since their first meeting, until Balthazar agrees to leave after finding the Grimhold. They track the Grimhold to Chinatown, where Horvath has released the next Morganian, Sun Lok. Dave defeats Sun Lok, and Balthazar retrieves the Grimhold. Dave changes his mind and agrees to become Balthazar's apprentice. He also becomes romantically involved with his childhood crush, Becky, against Balthazar's wishes and advice.

To get back the Grimhold, Horvath enlists the help of Drake Stone, a celebrity magician who is also a Morganian. They attempt to kill Dave, but Balthazar saves him. Cued by Horvath, Dave demands to know the truth about Balthazar's quest. Balthazar reveals that Morgana is trapped in the Grimhold with Veronica. As the Prime Merlinian, Dave is the only one who can stop her.

Despite Balthazar's disdain for his relationship with Becky, Dave convinces him to allow him to meet her for a date. Dave tries to use magic to clean his lab but loses control of his animated cleaning mops, which forces him to cancel his date with Becky. He is saved because of Balthazar's intervention and gives up on magic until Becky unknowingly changes his mind. He returns to his lab just as Drake and Horvath steal the Grimhold; Horvath betrays Drake by stealing his magic.

Horvath releases the witch Abigail Williams, using her to kidnap Becky at the radio station, and then steals her magic. He threatens to kill Becky, forcing Dave to surrender his ring. Without the ring, Dave has no conduit to use his magic, so Balthazar goes after Horvath in Battery Park. Horvath releases Morgana, still trapped inside Veronica's body, and slowly begins the Rising Spell. As Horvath animates the Charging Bull sculpture and commands it to attack Balthazar, Dave arrives and stuns Horvath with a Tesla coil tied to Balthazar's car while Balthazar's eagle flies away with the bull. Becky disrupts the Rising Spell, stunning Morgana.

Balthazar takes Morgana, body and soul, from Veronica into himself, but Morgana escapes and tries to incinerate them. Dave succeeds in stopping her without his ring. Morgana overwhelms Balthazar and kills him when he intercepts a bolt meant for Veronica. Dave makes another, larger Tesla coil out of the square's lamp posts and power lines to stun her and then fires a plasma barrage, finally destroying her. He revives Balthazar by restarting his heart with plasma shocks, and Balthazar reunites with Veronica. Dave and Becky fly to France for breakfast on Balthazar's eagle.

== Cast ==
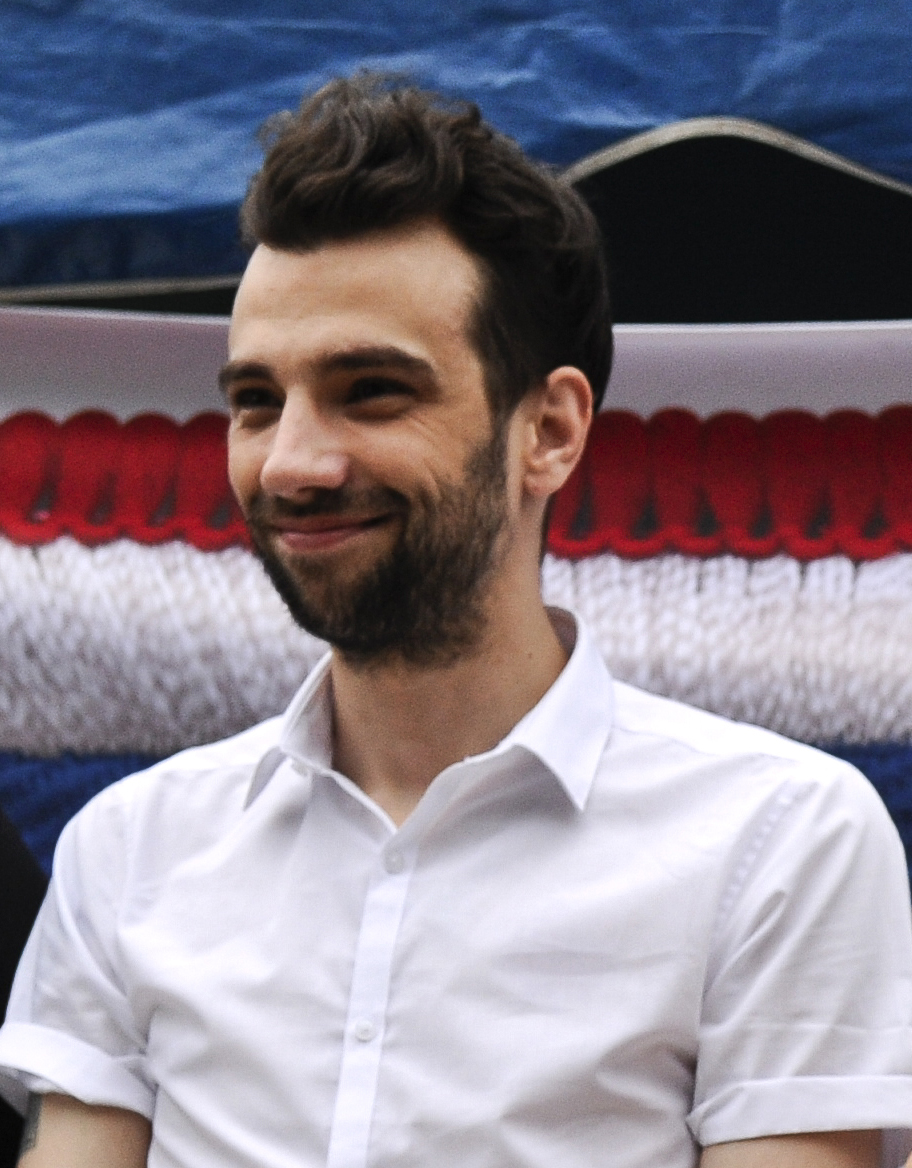
Jay Baruchel

- Nicolas Cage as Balthazar Blake, a millennia-old sorcerer of the 777th degree/rank; based on Yen Sid in Fantasia
- Jay Baruchel as David "Dave" Stutler, a highly intelligent college student who becomes Blake's reluctant apprentice
  - Jake Cherry as Young Dave Stutler
- Alfred Molina as Maxim Horvath, an evil sorcerer and Balthazar's nemesis. Once friends with his fellow apprentices, he became embittered when Veronica chose Balthazar over himself, eventually turning against them and Merlin.
- Teresa Palmer as Rebecca "Becky" Barnes, Dave's love interest
  - Peyton List as Young Rebecca "Becky" Barnes
- Toby Kebbell as Drake Stone, a Morganian who supports himself as a celebrity illusionist and joins forces with Horvath when called
- Omar Benson Miller as Bennet Zurrow, Dave's roommate
- Monica Bellucci as Veronica Gorloisen, a sorceress and Balthazar's love interest
- Alice Krige as Morgana le Fay
- Robert Capron as Oliver, Dave's childhood friend
- Ian McShane as The Narrator. While uncredited, McShane's role was confirmed by producer Jerry Bruckheimer.
- James A. Stephens as Merlin
- Gregory Woo as Sun Lok
- Nicole Ehinger as Abigail Williams
- Ethan Peck as Andre
- Adriane Lenox as Ms. Jessalyn Algar
- Henry Yuk as Chinese Dragon Carrier

== Production ==
The basic idea for the film was mostly Nicolas Cage's, who wanted to explore a mystic world and play a character with magical powers, and following a suggestion by his producer friend Todd Garner, decided to make a feature-length movie based upon the Fantasia segment of the same name. On February 12, 2007, this film was announced by Disney. References to the original animation include the scene where Dave animates mops to clean his laboratory, and having Mickey Mouse's hat in the post-credits scene.

=== Filming ===
The Sorcerer's Apprentice is set in New York City, and most scenes were shot on location, in places such as Washington Square Park and Chinatown's Eldrige Street. Dave's laboratory was filmed in either an abandoned subway station located under the New York City Hall or a studio recreation of it. The Bedford Armory in Crown Heights held several of the movie's sets, including Dave's laboratory, complete with inactive Tesla coil generators, Drake Stone's penthouse apartment and even part of Chinatown.

On May 4, 2009, while being filmed for a chase scene, a Ferrari F430 crashed through the window of a Sbarro restaurant in Times Square; two pedestrians were injured, one of them struck by a falling lamppost. Filming resumed the following night, when another accident occurred. The two accidents were blamed on rain making the roads slick.

To make the magic more believable, it was decided to have an emphasis on practical, on-set effects, such as making real fire, with fluids or flash powder being used for colored flames. To provide a lighting reference for the plasma bolts, the actors wore gloves with LED displays to make them glow before adding the computer-generated shot. For floating objects, they were either thrown with wires or held by stuntmen wearing green chroma key suits.

== Reception ==
=== Critical response ===
On Rotten Tomatoes, the film has an approval rating of 40% based on 171 reviews with an average rating of 5.3/10. The site's critical consensus reads, "It has a likable cast and loads of CGI spectacle, but for all but the least demanding viewers, The Sorcerer's Apprentice will be less than spellbinding." On Metacritic, the film has a score of 46 out of 100 based on 34 critics, indicating "mixed or average reviews". Audiences polled by CinemaScore gave the film an average grade of B+ on an A+ to F scale.

Kirk Honeycutt of The Hollywood Reporter has said that "The Sorcerer's Apprentice is a tired relic of summer-movie cliches, clearly beaten to death by far too many credited writers." Chicago Sun-Times film critic Roger Ebert gave the film two and a half stars out of four and wrote "This is a much better film than The Last Airbender, which is faint praise, but it's becoming clear that every weekend brings another heavily marketed action 'comedy' that pounds tens of millions out of consumers before evaporating."

=== Box office ===
The Sorcerer's Apprentice made an opening gross of $3,873,997 on its first day (Wednesday, July 14, 2010). It finished at #3 on its first weekend with $17,619,622 behind Inception and Despicable Me in the U.S. and Canada and gained another $8,928,219 on its first weekend internationally (in 13 countries) for a worldwide opening of $26,547,841. On October 28, 2010, The Sorcerer's Apprentice closed at the box-office in the United States and Canada with $63,150,991. As of December 12, 2010, it had earned $152,132,612 in other countries totaling $215,283,603 worldwide. Besides the U.S. and Canada, other countries where it grossed more than $10 million were Russia and the CIS ($13,630,194), France and the Maghreb region ($12,930,320) and Japan ($10,632,660). Its largest international weekend was August 13–15, during which it grossed $14,091,169 in 42 countries. As of the end of 2010, it occupied fourth place on the all-time chart of Sword and Sorcery films in the U.S. and Canada, and third place on the same chart worldwide. In July 2010, Parade magazine listed the film #1 on its list of "Worst Box Office Disasters of 2010 (So Far)".

== Home media ==
The Sorcerer's Apprentice was released on Blu-ray and DVD on November 30, 2010. It has sold 1,288,735 DVD units (equivalent to $21,609,680) since its release in DVD.

== Accolades ==
The Sorcerer's Apprentice was nominated for Choice Summer Movie at the 2010 Teen Choice Awards. It placed as one of the Top Box Office Films at the 2011 ASCAP Awards.

== Soundtrack ==
The film's score was composed by Trevor Rabin. It was released on July 6, 2010.

The Sorcerer's Apprentice

Film score by Trevor Rabin
- Released: July 6, 2010
- Genre: Film score
- Length: 43:04
- Label: Walt Disney

All tracks are written by Trevor Rabin.

No.	Title	Length
1.	"Sorcerer's Apprentice"	3:14
2.	"Story of the Prime Merlinian"	4:02
3.	"Note Chase"	0:39
4.	"Dave Revives Balthazar"	2:41
5.	"Classroom"	1:25
6.	"The Urn"	1:39
7.	"The Grimhold"	1:39
8.	"Morgana Fight"	2:59
9.	"The Ring"	1:43
10.	"Walk in the Rain"	0:43
11.	"Merlin Circle"	2:01
12.	"Dave Has Doubts"	0:53
13.	"Becky and Dave on Rooftop"	1:24
14.	"Car Chase"	3:54
15.	"Seeing Veronica"	0:55
16.	"Story of Veronica"	1:44
17.	"Horvath Made Off With the Grimhold"	1:13
18.	"Kiss from Becky"	0:33
19.	"Bull Fight"	2:10
20.	"Balthazar Saves Veronica"	1:13
21.	"Sorcerer’s Apprentice Suite"	2:28
22.	"Fantasia Original Demo"	4:50
Total length:		43:24

The songs "Secrets" by OneRepublic and "The Middle" by Jimmy Eat World are used in the film but do not appear on the album. Dukas' symphonic poem The Sorcerer's Apprentice was used in the scene where Dave brings a broomstick to life.

== See also ==
- List of films about witchcraft
