= The Beverly Hillbillies (film) =

1993 film by Penelope Spheeris

- Theatrical release poster
- Directed by: Penelope Spheeris
- Screenplay by: Lawrence Konner; Mark Rosenthal; Jim Fisher; Jim Staahl
- Story by: Lawrence Konner; Mark Rosenthal
- Based on: The Beverly Hillbillies by Paul Henning
- Produced by: Ian Bryce; Penelope Spheeris
- Starring: Diedrich Bader; Dabney Coleman; Erika Eleniak; Cloris Leachman; Rob Schneider; Lea Thompson; Lily Tomlin; Jim Varney
- Cinematography: Robert Brinkmann
- Edited by: Ross Albert
- Music by: Lalo Schifrin
- Distributed by: 20th Century Fox
- Release date: October 15, 1993
- Running time: 92 minutes
- Country: United States
- Language: English
- Budget: $25 million
- Box office: $57.4 million

The Beverly Hillbillies is a 1993 American comedy film directed by Penelope Spheeris, written by Lawrence Konner and Mark Rosenthal, and starring Jim Varney, Diedrich Bader, Dabney Coleman, Erika Eleniak, Cloris Leachman, Rob Schneider, Lea Thompson and Lily Tomlin.

Based on the television series of the same name (which ran from 1962 to 1971), the film features cameo appearances by Buddy Ebsen (the original Jed Clampett, in his final motion picture appearance, playing his other starring television role, Detective Barnaby Jones), Dolly Parton and Zsa Zsa Gabor. The film grossed $57 million worldwide and was panned by critics. It follows a poor hillbilly named Jed Clampett, who becomes a billionaire after inadvertently finding crude oil on his property while firing his gun.

== Plot ==
Jed Clampett, a hillbilly of humble station from Arkansas, accidentally discovers oil on his land while shooting at a jackrabbit. Ozark Mountain Oil, interested in purchasing his land, offers him $1 billion for the property. Unsure of what to do, Jed consults his sister, Pearl Bodine, during a family dinner. Pearl suggests that a change of scenery for Jed's daughter, Elly May, would be a good thing. Jed and his daughter Elly, his mother-in-law, Daisy Moses (aka "Granny"), and his nephew, Jethro, Pearl's son, load up Jethro's old, dilapidated truck with their possessions and move to Beverly Hills, California, even though Granny is reluctant to come.

Milburn Drysdale, the CEO of the Commerce Bank of Beverly Hills, where Jed has opened an account and banked his money, sends out his secretary/assistant, Jane Hathaway to meet the Clampetts at their new estate that is next door to his. Jane calls the Beverly Hills Police after the Clampetts arrive, mistaking them for burglars. Upon learning of Jane's mistake at the police station, Drysdale briefly fires her. But seeing that Jed insists that he still wants her to watch over his affairs, Drysdale rehires her.

The Clampetts settle into their new surroundings. Drysdale and his wife, Margaret, push their reluctant son, Morgan Drysdale, into befriending Elly May, to whom he eventually develops an attraction. Jane is also smitten by Jethro, who seems ignorant of her affections.

Jed requests Jane's assistance in helping him search for someone who will help turn Elly May into a lady and also wants to get married, so Miss Hathaway has to play matchmaker. Woodrow Tyler, a banker at Drysdale's bank, catches wind of this and contrives a scheme with his con artist girlfriend, Laura Jackson, to steal Jed's money by having her marry Jed. She poses as a French etiquette teacher, Laurette Voleur, and asks for work. 'Laurette' feigns romantic interest in Jed, which eventually leads to him proposing marriage to her.

Shortly before the wedding, Granny hears Laura and Woodrow talking about the scam and sees them kiss. Granny reveals herself to the pair and threatens to expose their scam to Jed, and thus the impending wedding will be off. But before she can do so, they capture her, restrain her, and have her institutionalized at the Los Viejos Nursing Home under the guise of their crazy aunt, so that she cannot contact Jed.

At the wedding, Woodrow prepares to transfer all of Clampett's money in Drysdale's bank to a Swiss account, on his laptop computer, once the couple says 'I do'. Realizing that Granny is missing, Jane goes to the office of private investigator Barnaby Jones and after learning where Granny is and who Laura really is, poses as a nurse and breaks her out. Jane makes a call to Tyler, unaware of his role in the scam, and alerts him about Laurette. Jane soon learns from Granny that Tyler shared a role in the con. Granny and Jane arrive at the wedding and foil Laura and Tyler's plan. Refusing to let their scam go awry, Laura and Tyler plot to send Clampett's billions bouncing through a score of banks but fail when Jane grabs a shotgun and blows the laptop to bits. The police arrest Laura and Woodrow. Jed decides that, since the wedding was off, they should have 'one hellacious shindig'.

== Cast ==
- Jim Varney as Jedidiah D. 'Jed' Clampett, the patriarch of the Clampett family, Granny's son-in-law, Pearl's cousin, Jethro and Jethrine's first cousin once removed (addressed as "Uncle Jed").
- Diedrich Bader as Jethro Bodine, Pearl's son, Jed's first cousin once removed and Elly May's second cousin who accompanies his family to Beverly Hills.
  - Diedrich Bader also portrays Jethrine Bodine, Jethro's twin, Pearl's daughter, Jed's first cousin once removed, and Elly May's second cousin.
- Erika Eleniak as Elly May Clampett, Jed's animal-loving tomboy daughter, Pearl's first cousin once removed, and Jethro and Jethrine's second cousin.
- Cloris Leachman as Daisy May "Granny" Moses, Jed's mother-in-law and Elly May's maternal grandmother.
- Dabney Coleman as Milburn Drysdale, the CEO of the Commerce Bank of Beverly Hills, Margaret's husband, and Morgan's father.
- Lily Tomlin as Jane Hathaway, the secretary of Milburn who falls for Jethro.
- Rob Schneider as Woodrow Tyler, a banker at Commerce Bank who conspires to steal Clampett's fortune.
- Lea Thompson as Laura Jackson, a con artist and girlfriend of Woodrow who poses as a French etiquette teacher named "Laurette Voleur".
- Penny Fuller as Margaret Drysdale, Milburn's wife and Morgan's mother.
- Kevin Connolly as Morgan Drysdale, Milburn and Margaret's son who develops a crush on Elly May.
- Linda Carlson as Pearl Bodine, Jed's cousin, Jethro and Jethrine's mother, and Elly May's first cousin once removed ("Aunt Pearl").
- Buddy Ebsen as Barnaby Jones, a PI Jane enlists to help find Granny and expose Laurette. Ebsen played Jed in the original television series, and was reprising the lead from his subsequent hit show.
- Leann Hunley as Miss. Arlington.
- Carmen Filpi as Frank
- Robert Easton as Mayor Jasper, the Mayor of Beverly Hills.
- David L. Crowley as Danforth
- Dolly Parton as Herself.
- Zsa Zsa Gabor as Herself.

The Dolly Parton 'band' was composed of members of Rhino Bucket (who had contributed a song on the soundtrack of the 1992 movie Wayne's World, also directed by Penelope Spheeris), the Dwight Yoakam Band (Skip Edwards), and Vern Monnett (Randy Meisner, Texas Tornados and Gary Allan). Parton's appearance reunited her with 9 to 5 co-stars Lily Tomlin and Dabney Coleman.

== Release ==
In its first weekend, The Beverly Hillbillies grossed $9,525,375 at the US box office. The film moved up to number one the following week. It grossed $40 million in the United and States and Canada and $57.4 million worldwide.

== Reception ==
On Rotten Tomatoes, the film has an approval rating of 26% based on reviews from 31 critics. The site's consensus states: "Wasting a talented cast and director Penelope Spheeris' deft comedic touch on crude hijinks, this lame adaptation digs for comedic gold and only finds dirt". On Metacritic the film has a score of 37 out of 100 based on reviews from 24 critics, indicating "generally unfavorable reviews". Audiences surveyed by CinemaScore gave the film a grade of 'B+' on scale of A+ to F.

Roger Ebert of the Chicago Sun-Times, gave the film half a star out of a possible 4, arguing that it did not capture the appeal of the original television series nor did it improve the source material:

The Beverly Hillbillies was a major disappointment for Spheeris after her surprising triumph with Wayne's World the year before: 'When directors make a wonderful movie, you look forward to their next one with a special anticipation, thinking maybe they've got the secret. If it turns out they don't, you feel almost betrayed'. That's how I felt after The Beverly Hillbillies, one of the worst movies of this or any year.

Peter Travers of Rolling Stone, wrote:

The Beverly Hillbillies is not, as the saying goes, a critic's picture. Still, you want to root for a movie that wallows without shame in leering, fatuous humor. I did—for about 15 minutes—then the sameness set in like an overdose of Beavis and Butt-Head.

Owen Gleiberman of Entertainment Weekly, gave the film a grade 'D' and wrote: "The plot, which features Lea Thompson as a gold digger scheming to marry Jed, is like something you'd catch on the USA Network at 4 a.m. But enough of beating a dead possum. After sitting through The Beverly Hillbillies, I now realize that the best tribute anyone can make to the pop detritus of our childhood is to let it rest in peace".

== Video game ==
In 1993, Synergistic Software developed and Capstone Software published a game for MS-DOS loosely based on the film. The game is a point-and-click adventure game.
