= Robert Eversz =

American novelist

- Born: Robert LcLeod Eversz; April 22, 1954 (age 72); Great Falls, Montana, U.S.
- Education: University of California, Santa Cruz (BA); UCLA School of Theater, Film and Television (MFA)
- Occupations: Writer; screenwriter; educator

Robert McLeod Eversz (born April 22, 1954) is an American fiction writer, screenwriter, and educator. The author of the Nina Zero novels, he is a co-founder of the Prague Summer Program for writers, a study abroad program for creative writers in the English language.

== Life ==
Robert Eversz was born in Great Falls, Montana. He received his BA at the University of California, Santa Cruz, followed by his MFA at the UCLA School of Theater, Film and Television.

Eversz co-founded the Prague Summer Program, and occupies a seat on the permanent faculty. He served as visiting professor of English at Western Michigan University in 2005 and 2006, and as writer-in-residence in 2007. In 2007, he was the finalists’ judge for the AWP Award Series in the Novel. He also teaches at the UCLA Extension Writers' Program.

== Literary work ==
Eversz is best known as the author of the award-winning series of crime novels featuring the paparazza Nina Zero, set in Southern California. The first novel in the series, Shooting Elvis, was Oslo Aftenposten’s Crime Novel of the Year in 1997, and the Best Humorous Crime Novel of 1996 in The Guardian (awarded by Val McDermid). The next in the series, Killing Paparazzi, was a The Washington Post Book World Rave in 2001. The Washington Post has written favorable reviews for the following titles in the series. His novels have been translated into fifteen languages.

His expatriate novel, Gypsy Hearts, is set in Prague of the 1990s.

== Selected bibliography ==
- Bottom Line is Murder 1988
- False Profit 1990
- Shooting Elvis, Grove/Atlantic, 1996
- Gypsy Hearts, Grove/Atlantic, 1998
- Killing Paparazzi, Macmillan, 2001
- Burning Garbo, Simon & Schuster, 2003
- Digging James Dean, Simon & Schuster, 2004
- Zero to the Bone, Simon & Schuster, 2006
