= UCLA Extension Writers' Program =

Unit in University of California, Los Angeles Extension program

UCLA Extension Writers' Program is a unit within UCLA Extension, the not-for-profit and self-supporting community outreach arm of the University of California, Los Angeles. Located in the Westwood Village area of Los Angeles, the UCLA Extension Writers' Program offers approximately 400 annual open-enrollment screenwriting and creative writing courses for all levels of writers. Courses are available online and on the UCLA campuses in downtown Los Angeles and Woodland Hills. All courses are approved by the UCLA Academic Senate.

== History ==
The Regents of the University of California established University Extension in 1891. A permanent Extension office was opened in Los Angeles in 1917. Extension moved to the UCLA campus in 1948, and subsequently to its location at Gayley and LeConte in 1971. The UCLA Extension Writers' Program was established in 1966.

Dr. Linda Venis served as the Director of the Writers' Program from August 1986 until June 2016, when she retired. In October 2016, Charles Jensen was hired to head up the Program.

== Program ==
The Writers' Program offers approximately 400 annual onsite and online courses including beginning, intermediate, and advanced-level courses in fiction, memoir, personal essay, poetry, playwriting, editing, publishing, and screenwriting. Courses are taught by a roster of more than 200 published or produced writing professionals.

Students may choose from five certificate programs (Fiction, Creative Nonfiction, Feature Film Writing, Television Writing and Film and TV Comprehensive) for a structured course of study, as well as four specializations for a focused approach to a specific topic.

== Books ==
In 2013, Gotham Books published two books that were edited by then-Writers' Program Director Linda Venis and written by Writers' Program instructors. The books are Cut to the Chase: Writing Feature Films with the Pros at UCLA Extension Writers' Program and Inside the Room: Writing Television with the Pros at UCLA Extension Writers' Program.

== Notable instructors ==
Writers' Program instructors are professional writers. Some of the Program's notable instructors have included:

- Shauna Barbosa, poetry
- Francesca Lia Block, fiction and writing for young readers
- Alyx Dellamonica, fiction
- Robert Eversz, fiction
- Kevin Kelton, screenwriting
- Caroline Leavitt, fiction
- Ben Loory, fiction
- Suzanne Lummis, poetry
- Lou Mathews, fiction
- Nancy Nigrosh, screenwriting
- Mark Sarvas, fiction
- Jule Selbo, screenwriting
- Brittany and Brianna Winner, screenwriting and fiction

== Notable alumni ==
Many of UCLA Extension Writers' Program students have published or produced work after leaving the program, including:

- Stuart Beattie, G.I. Joe: The Rise of Cobra; Australia; Pirates of the Caribbean: The Curse of the Black Pearl; 30 Days of Night; Collateral
- Karen E. Bender, author of Refund: Stories
- Michelle Bitting, author of poetry collections Notes to the Beloved; Good Friday Kiss; Blue Laws
- Octavia E. Butler, science fiction author and winner of Hugo and Nebula awards and a MacArthur Fellowship
- Hillary Carlip, author of Queen of the Oddballs; Girl Power: Young Women Speak Out
- Tucker Cawley, Parks and Recreation, Everybody Loves Raymond
- Pauline W. Chen, author of Final Exam
- Zoanne Clack, Grey's Anatomy
- Bryan Cogman, Game of Thrones
- Lindy DeKoven, author of Primetime Princess
- Eric Jerome Dickey, Resurrecting Midnight
- Doug Ellin, Entourage
- Lee Eisenberg, Hello Ladies: The Movie; The Office; Bad Teacher; Year One
- Maria Amparo Escandón, author of Esperanza's Box of Saints; screenwriter of Santitos
- Janet Fitch, White Oleander (Oprah Pick)
- James Franco, author of Palo Alto: Stories
- Christina García, author of Dreaming in Cuban
- Tod Goldberg, author of Gangsterland; Living Dead Girl; Burn Notice
- Al Gough and Miles Millar, screenwriters of Spider-man 2; Shanghai Noon; Smallville; Lethal Weapon 4
- Sue Grafton, author of the Kinsey Millhone series
- Reyna Grande, author of Across a Hundred Mountains; Dancing with Butterflies; The Distance Between Us
- Drew Z. Greenberg, screenwriter/producer, Dexter; Smallville; Buffy the Vampire Slayer; The O.C.
- Gavin Hood, Tsotsi (Academy Award winner, Best Foreign Film)
- Tara Ison, author of Stories; A Child Out of Alcatraz
- James Kirkwood, Pulitzer Prize- and Tony Award-winning playwright, A Chorus Line
- Harley Jane Kozak, author of Dating Dead Men; Dating Is Murder; Dead Ex; A Date You Can't Refuse
- Chad Kultgen, author of The Average American Male; The Lie; Men, Women, and Children
- Laila Lalami, author of The Moor's Account (Pulitzer Prize finalist) and The Other Americans (National Book Award Finalist)
- Rob Reid, author of Year Zero
- Melissa Rosenberg, adaptation of Twilight, Dexter, Boston Public, Jessica Jones
- Randi Mayem Singer, Mrs. Doubtfire
- J. Ryan Stradal, author of Kitchens of the Great Midwest
- Earl W. Wallace, Witness (Academy Award winner for Best Original Screenplay)
- Joseph Wambaugh, The Onion Field
- Kevin Williamson, Scream, Dawson's Creek
- Iris Yamashita, Letters from Iwo Jima (Academy Award nominee for Best Original Screenplay)

== Awards ==
Established in 1987, in memory of Diane Thomas, the Diane Thomas Screenwriting Award was replaced by the UCLA Extension Screenplay Competition, in 2006.

Established in 1991, in memory of James Kirkwood, The James Kirkwood Literary Prize honors the literary achievements of new generations of fiction writers.

In 2014, the Writers' Program established the Allegra Johnson Prize, a merit-based award with a prize of $5,000. The award is given to a promising novelist or memoirist in alternating years, providing both formal recognition of their talent and financial resources to support them as they complete their manuscripts.
