= Nancy Nigrosh =

American talent agent

Nancy Nigrosh is the former head of The Gersh Agency Literary Department and team member of both the Literary and Talent Departments at Innovative Artists. Nigrosh's clients have included Chris Eyre, Academy Award-winner Kathryn Bigelow, Amanda Brown, Stuart Beattie, Leslye Headland and Barry Morrow.

== Early life and education ==
During her time at NYU's Tisch School of the Arts, Nigrosh's mentor Terry Southern offered to co-write a script that she had pitched in class and subsequently after their collaboration, encouraged her to apply to UCLA's School of Theater Film & Television Department where she was accepted into the Masters Screenwriting Program.

== Career ==
Nigrosh first worked as a script supervisor for Martin Scorsese's Mean Streets. Due to her ability to complexly discern levels of writing skills, this led her to work as a freelance reader for a number of production companies, which then launched her career as a literary agent in Hollywood.

Currently, she works as a writers' career consultant, often focusing on professional direction for aspiring people of color and women writers. She also teaches at UCLA Extension Writers' Program and frequently contributes to Indiewire's "Thompson on Hollywood" blog.
