= Mona Lisa Smile =

- Theatrical release poster
- Directed by: Mike Newell
- Written by: Lawrence Konner; Mark Rosenthal
- Produced by: Elaine Goldsmith-Thomas; Deborah Schindler; Paul Schiff
- Starring: Julia Roberts; Kirsten Dunst; Julia Stiles; Maggie Gyllenhaal; Dominic West; Juliet Stevenson; Marcia Gay Harden
- Cinematography: Anastas Michos
- Edited by: Mick Audsley
- Music by: Rachel Portman
- Production companies: Columbia Pictures; Revolution Studios; Red Om Films Productions
- Distributed by: Sony Pictures Releasing
- Release date: December 19, 2003
- Running time: 119 minutes
- Country: United States
- Languages: English; Italian
- Budget: $72.3 million
- Box office: $141.3 million

Mona Lisa Smile is a 2003 American drama film produced by Revolution Studios and Columbia Pictures in association with Red Om Films Productions, directed by Mike Newell, written by Lawrence Konner and Mark Rosenthal, and starring Julia Roberts, Kirsten Dunst, Julia Stiles, and Maggie Gyllenhaal.

The title is a reference to the Mona Lisa, the famous painting by Leonardo da Vinci, and to the song of the same name, originally performed by Nat King Cole, which was covered by Seal for the film. Julia Roberts received a record $25 million for her performance, the highest ever earned by an actress at that time.

Mona Lisa Smile was released by Sony Pictures Releasing on December 19, 2003. The film received mixed to negative reviews from critics and grossed $141.3 million against a $72.3 million budget.

== Plot ==
In 1953, recent UCLA graduate Katherine Ann Watson accepts an Art History teaching position at Wellesley College. She quickly discovers her students have memorized the entire textbook and syllabus, so she introduces modern art and encourages discussion about what art is. Katherine also challenges her students to achieve more in life than marriage.

Outspoken conservative Betty Warren writes editorials for the college paper and insists that a universal standard exists for what is good art. She attacks Katherine for advocating that women seek careers in addition to marriage and exposes campus nurse Amanda Armstrong for supplying contraception to students, resulting in her termination.

Betty is eager to marry her fiancé, Spencer, and expects the traditional married-student exemptions; however, Katherine insists on grading her based on merit and expects her to complete all assignments and tests. When Betty's married life does not go smoothly, she begins taking out her frustrations on the other girls, particularly Connie and Giselle.

Betty often ridicules Connie Baker and insists her cousin, Charlie, is taking Connie to her wedding reception only as a favor. Connie is surprised when he expresses genuine interest in her, and they begin dating. Connie breaks things off after Betty claims Charlie is actually dating Deb, the daughter of the couple Charlie had avoided while they were on holiday. Betty claims Connie is just a casual fling that Charlie was trying to hide.

Weeks later, Connie and Charlie reconnect, with him insisting he had stopped seeing Deb the previous summer and only began dating his current girlfriend after Connie stopped seeing him. Connie tearfully confronts Betty for lying and being hurtful, asking why Betty could not let her be happy. Later, Connie breaks into Charlie's dorm to ask for another chance, and they rekindle their relationship.

Joan Brandwyn considers studying law at Yale Law School, so Katherine encourages her to apply. Although accepted, Joan declines admission to instead elope with Tom Donegal. When Joan tells Katherine that it is what she truly wants, Katherine congratulates her and wishes her happiness.

Giselle Levy is liberal about sex and has had several lovers, including Wellesley Italian professor, Bill Dunbar. She moves on from him when he and Katherine begin dating. Giselle admires Katherine for encouraging students' independence. She earns Betty's enmity as Betty's marriage falls apart.

Katherine's California boyfriend, Paul, unexpectedly visits and proposes, but Katherine declines, and they break up. She begins dating Bill Dunbar, who often recounts stories about his war service in Italy. Bill has had affairs with students, including Giselle, so Katherine insists he stop. Upon learning that Bill never served in Italy and was only stationed at the Army Languages Center on Long Island, Katherine ends the relationship.

Betty's marriage falls apart after Spencer has an affair. Betty leaves him, but her mother demands that she forgive him. She confronts Giselle in her dorm, at first attacking her for being promiscuous, then breaking down. Giselle is the only student who knows about Spencer's infidelity and comforts Betty.

Betty regrets maligning Katherine in her editorials. Eventually, Betty files for divorce, and she and Giselle plan to find an apartment in Greenwich Village. When Betty's mother confronts her at graduation, Betty chastises her and credits Katherine as being the only one who supported her, vowing to live her own life.

Despite disapproving of Katherine's progressive teaching methods, Wellesley administrators invite her to return the following year as her course is extremely popular, but only under strict conditions. Katherine refuses and resigns. Betty dedicates her last editorial to her, admiring her for living by example and challenging them to see the world through new eyes. As Katherine leaves in a taxi, the students follow on their bikes to say goodbye.

== Cast ==
- Julia Roberts as Katherine Ann Watson
- Kirsten Dunst as Elizabeth "Betty" Warren (Jones)
- Julia Stiles as Joan Brandwyn (Donegal)
- Maggie Gyllenhaal as Giselle Levy
- Juliet Stevenson as Amanda Armstrong
- Dominic West as Bill Dunbar
- Ginnifer Goodwin as Constance "Connie" Baker
- Topher Grace as Tommy Donegal
- John Slattery as Paul Moore
- Marcia Gay Harden as Nancy Abbey
- Jordan Bridges as Spencer Jones
- Marian Seldes as President Jocelyn Carr
- Donna Mitchell as Mrs. Warren
- Terence Rigby as Dr. Edward Staunton
- Laura Allen as Susan Delacorte
- Ebon Moss-Bachrach as Charlie Stewart
- Lisa Roberts Gillan as Miss Albini
- Emily Bauer as a student
- Annika Marks as a student
- Lily Rabe as a student
- Krysten Ritter as a student
- Tori Amos as wedding singer

== Soundtrack ==
Mona Lisa Smile: Music from the Motion Picture

Soundtrack album by Various
- Released: December 19, 2003
- Genre: Jazz • easy listening • big band
- Length: 48:27
- Label: Sony Music

No.	Title	Performer	Length
1.	"Mona Lisa"	Seal	3:11
2.	"You Belong to Me"	Tori Amos	3:03
3.	"Bewitched"	Celine Dion	2:45
4.	"The Heart of Every Girl"	Elton John	3:40
5.	"Santa Baby"	Macy Gray	3:29
6.	"Murder, He Says"	Tori Amos	3:22
7.	"Besame Mucho"	Chris Isaak	2:46
8.	"Secret Love"	Mandy Moore	3:40
9.	"What'll I Do"	Alison Krauss	3:12
10.	"Istanbul (Not Constantinople)"	The Trevor Horn Orchestra	2:26
11.	"Sh-Boom (Life Could Be a Dream)"	The Trevor Horn Orchestra	2:49
12.	"I'm Beginning to See the Light"	Kelly Rowland	1:47
13.	"I've Got the World on a String"	Lisa Stansfield	2:20
14.	"Smile"	Barbra Streisand	4:17
15.	"Suite"	Rachel Portman	5:33
Total length:			48:27

== Box office ==
In its first weekend, Mona Lisa Smile opened at number two at the U.S. box office, earning US$11,528,498 behind The Lord of the Rings: The Return of the King. By the end of its run, while the film had grossed a respectable $141,337,989 worldwide, its U.S. domestic gross did not meet its $65 million budget, falling short at $63,860,942.

== Reception ==
Mona Lisa Smile received mixed to negative reviews from film critics. On Rotten Tomatoes, it has a 33% approval rating based on 150 reviews, with an average score of 4.9/10 and a consensus: "Though Mona Lisa Smile espouses the value of breaking barriers, the movie itself is predictable." On Metacritic, the film has a weighted average score of 45 out of 100, based on 40 critics, indicating "mixed or average reviews". Audiences polled by CinemaScore gave the film an average grade of "B" on an A+ to F scale.

In a typical review, Claudia Puig of USA Today wrote, "it's Dead Poets Society as a chick flick, without the compelling drama and inspiration... even Roberts doesn't seem convinced. She gives a rather blah performance as if she's not fully committed to the role... Rather than being a fascinating exploration of a much more constrained time in our social history, the film simply feels anachronistic. The film deserves a solid 'C' for mediocrity and muted appeal." Critic Elizabeth M. Tamny of the Chicago Reader shared this negative assessment, writing "Part of the problem is simply that Mona Lisa Smile is a Hollywood film, and Hollywood isn't good at depicting the life of the mind... And Julia Roberts is no help--you either like her or you don't, but either way it has little to do with talent. She's not so much an actor as a vessel for earnest reactions. The fact is... It's easier to take on an extremely black-and-white version of the most salient question from this film - can women bake their cake and eat it too? - than try to answer it in the present."

David Ansen of Newsweek wrote, "What drew the usually astute Mike Newell ('Four Weddings and a Funeral', 'Donnie Brasco') to this project? There are hints that the script (credited to Mark Rosenthal and Lawrence Konner) may once have had more shadings - a suggestion that Katherine's idealism is a form of power-tripping; that she's afraid of intimacy - but any ambiguity is quickly brushed aside to make way for the Julia lovefest. Newell, no hack, tries not to milk the clichés shamelessly, and that may be the movie's final undoing. Lacking the courage of its own vulgarity, 'Mona Lisa Smile' is as tepid as old bathwater."

=== Accolades ===
Association	Category	Recipient	Results
Critics Choice Movie Award	Best Song	Elton John; Bernie Taupin	Nominated
Golden Globe Award	Best Original Song	Elton John; Bernie Taupin	Nominated
Phoenix Film Critics Society Award	Best Use of Previously Published or Recorded Music	—N/a	Nominated
Satellite Award	Best Original Song	Elton John	Nominated
Teen Choice Award	Choice Movie Actress - Drama/Action-Adventure	Julia Stiles	Nominated
Teen Choice Award	Choice Movie - Sleazebag	Kirsten Dunst	Nominated

== Reaction from Wellesley and Wellesley alumnae ==
The college issued an official statement explaining its decision to allow the film to shoot on campus.

In a message to Wellesley alumnae about the film, Wellesley College president Diana Chapman Walsh expressed regret over some of the reactions it generated, as many alumnae from the 1950s felt the film's portrayal of Wellesley was inaccurate.
