= The Jewel of the Nile =

1985 adventure comedy film by Lewis Teague

- Promotional film poster by Robert Rodriguez
- Directed by: Lewis Teague
- Written by: Lawrence Konner; Mark Rosenthal
- Based on: Characters by Diane Thomas
- Produced by: Michael Douglas
- Starring: Michael Douglas; Kathleen Turner; Danny DeVito
- Cinematography: Jan de Bont
- Edited by: Peter Boita; Michael Ellis
- Music by: Jack Nitzsche
- Production companies: The Stone Group, Ltd.
- Distributed by: 20th Century Fox
- Release date: December 11, 1985
- Running time: 107 minutes
- Country: United States
- Language: English
- Budget: $25 million
- Box office: $96.8 million

The Jewel of the Nile is a 1985 American action-adventure romantic comedy film directed by Lewis Teague and produced by Michael Douglas, who also starred in the lead role, reuniting with co-stars Kathleen Turner and Danny DeVito, reprising their roles from the 1984 action-adventure film Romancing the Stone.

Like Romancing the Stone, the opening scene takes place in one of Joan's novels. This time, instead of Jesse and Angelina in Joan's wild-west scenario, Joan and Jack are about to be married when pirates attack their ship. The Jewel of the Nile sends its characters off on a new adventure in a fictional African desert, in an effort to find the fabled "Jewel of the Nile".

The song performed by Billy Ocean, "When the Going Gets Tough, the Tough Get Going", became a major international hit, reaching #1 in the UK and #2 in the US.

== Plot ==
Six months after the events of Romancing the Stone, Joan Wilder's and Jack Colton's romance has grown stale. While moored at a port in Southern France, Joan, suffering writer's block, wants to return to New York, while Jack prefers sailing the world on his boat. At a book signing engagement, Joan meets Omar Khalifa, a charming Arab ruler who wants Joan to write his biography.

Joan accepts and leaves with Omar over Jack's protests. Jack later runs into Ralph, the swindler from Jack and Joan's previous adventure in Colombia, who demands that Jack turn over the stone Jack and Joan found. Shortly after, an Arab, Tarak, informs Jack about Omar's true intentions and claims that Omar has the "Jewel of the Nile." Just as Tarak finishes his explanations, the boat explodes from a bomb set by one of Omar's men. Ralph and Jack team up to find Joan and the fabled jewel.

Joan soon discovers that Omar is a brutal dictator rather than the enlightened ruler which he claimed would unite the Arab world. In the palace jail, Joan encounters Al-Julhara, a holy man who is, in fact, the "Jewel of the Nile". (Note: From Arabic الجوهرة, al-jawhara, "the jewel.") Al-Julhara tells Joan that Omar plans to declare himself ruler of all of the Arab world at a ceremony in the city of Kadir. Realizing that Al-Julhara is the only one who can stop Omar, Joan escorts him to Kadir. The pair escape and find Jack, and they flee into the desert in Omar's hijacked F-16 fighter jet. Ralph is captured by Tarak's rebel Sufi tribe, sworn to protect the Jewel.

Omar intends to use a smoke-and-mirror special effect in Kadir to convince onlookers that he is the prophet who will unite the Arab world. Jack, Joan, and Al-Julhara arrive to expose Omar but are captured. Omar puts Jack and Joan in a death trap while Al-Julhara is in a stockade. Ralph, along with the Sufi tribe, arrives in time to rescue the three prisoners.

As Omar takes center stage to address the Arab people, Jack and Joan disrupt the ceremony while the Sufi battle Omar's guards. Jack and Joan are separated as a fire breaks out, and Omar corners Joan atop the burning scaffolding. Ralph, using a giant crane, helps Jack reach Joan. He kicks Omar into the flames, killing him. Al-Julhara rises and safely walks through the fire, fulfilling the prophecy that he is the true spiritual leader.

The following day, Jack and Joan are married by Al-Julhara. While Ralph is genuinely happy for Jack and Joan, he laments once again having gained nothing for his efforts, but Tarak acknowledges that he is a true Sufi friend and presents him with a jeweled dagger as Jack and Joan happily sail away down the Nile.

== Cast ==
- Michael Douglas as Jack Colton
- Kathleen Turner as Joan Wilder Colton
- Danny DeVito as Ralph
- Spiros Focás as Omar Khalifa
- Avner Eisenberg as Al-Julhara
- Hamid Fillali as Rachid
- Daniel Peacock as Rock Promoter
- Holland Taylor as Gloria Horne
- Guy Cuevas as Le Vasseur
- Peter DePalma as Missionary (as Peter De Palma)
- Mark Daly Richards as Pirate
- The Flying Karamazov Brothers

- Paul David Magid as Tarak
- Howard Jay Patterson as Barak
- Randall Edwin Nelson as Karak
- Samuel Ross Williams as Arak
- Timothy Daniel Furst as Sarak

== Production ==
With a $21 million budget, principal photography began April 22, 1985, and wrapped on July 25, 1985. Location shooting took place at Villefranche-sur-Mer and the Palais des Festivals et des Congrès, Cannes, France, Ait Benhaddou near Ouarzazate and Meknes, Morocco, among other locations, including Zion National Park, Springdale, Utah.

At the time, both Kathleen Turner and Michael Douglas only made the sequel because they were contractually obligated to do so, although Douglas was much more invested in the film as its producer. At one point during pre-production, Turner tried to back out of the project because she found the script "terrible, formulaic, sentimental", until 20th Century Fox threatened her with a $25 million lawsuit for breach of contract. Douglas intervened on her behalf and ensured that a rewrite was made.

Turner was disappointed that Douglas did not ask Diane Thomas, the writer who had penned the script for Romancing the Stone, to return for the sequel, apparently because he decided her asking price was too high. When Douglas agreed to undertake rewrites to please Turner, Thomas was asked to consult on alterations, but Turner remained disappointed with the script. She elaborated in an interview in 2018:

"... ultimately I read the script on a plane to Morocco, where the film was shooting, and I was furious. It didn’t have what Michael said it’d have. When I got to the hotel in Fez, Michael and I sat down on the floor with three versions of the script. We were trading pages to get a script that was acceptable to both of us. It was, '“I’ll do this if you’ll do that.”' It was frustrating."

Filming in North Africa was dogged with problems from unbearable 120-degree-Fahrenheit heat to problems with the local crew but the most troubling concern was that the director showed that he was not up to the task of helming an action film. After one massive night scene that was hours in setup, and cast and crew in place, it was only then that someone noticed that there was no film in the cameras. As producer, Michael Douglas exploded; the whole scene had to be re-filmed another day, only after the raw film stock was finally located. More problems with local customs cropped up, with film and equipment mysteriously held up by customs until the requisite bribes were paid. In the end, being only three weeks behind schedule was a minor triumph for Douglas.

Approximately two weeks before principal photography began, an aircraft carrying Richard Dawking (production designer) and Bryan Coates (production manager) crashed during location scouting over the countryside of Morocco, killing all on board. The film is dedicated to the memory of Dawking and Coates, as well as screenwriter Diane Thomas, who had died in an automobile accident six weeks before the film's release. During filming in Morocco, Douglas and Turner, flying in an executive jet aircraft, had a near-accident when their aircraft wing struck the runway in a heavy landing.

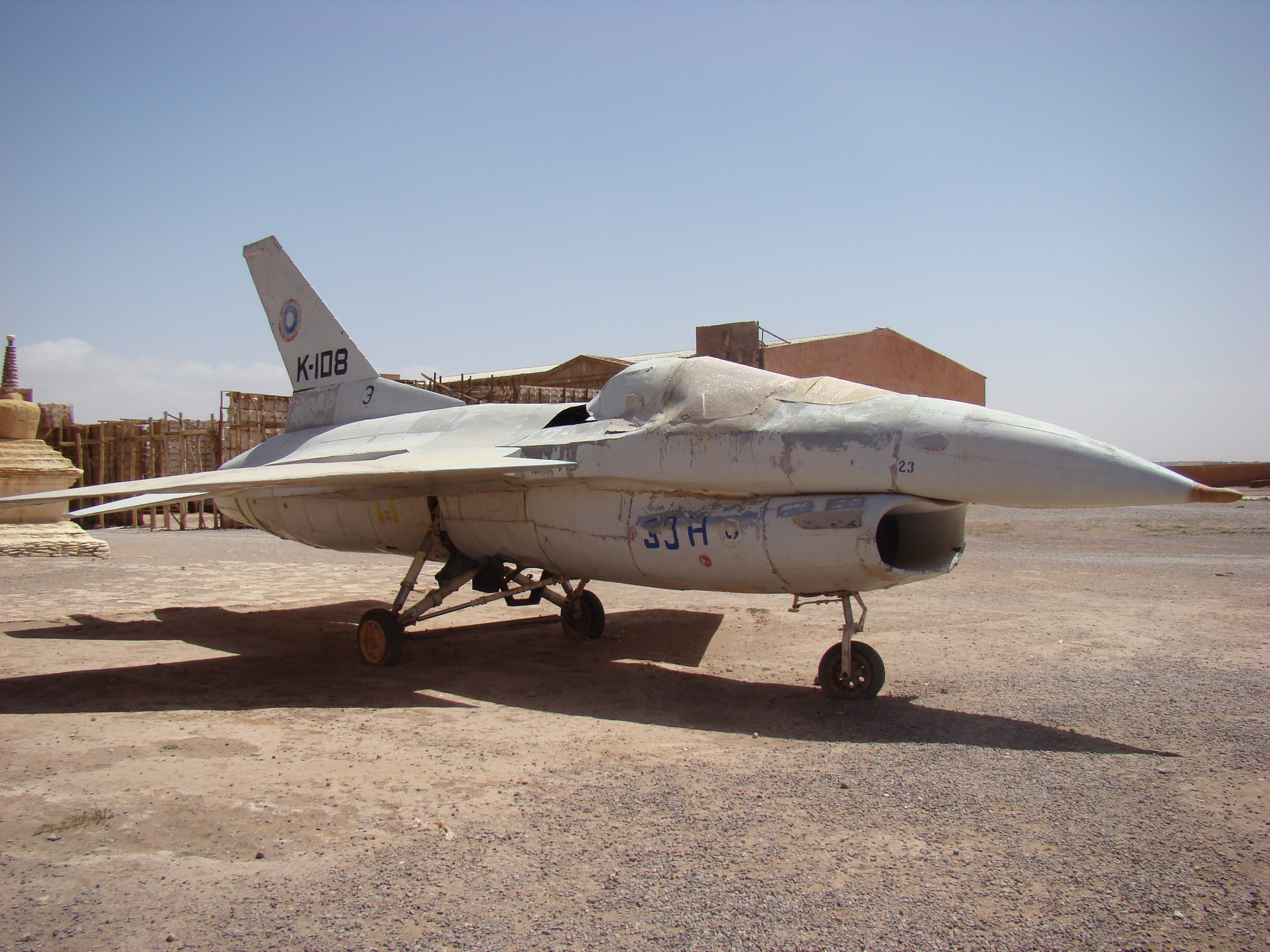
A model of an F-16B two-seat fighter aircraft used in the film The Jewel of the Nile on display at Atlas Film Studios, Ouarzazate in Morocco

The use of a General Dynamics F-16 Fighting Falcon mockup was a key element of the main characters' escaping from a fortified town. The wooden, styrofoam and fibreglass mockup was built on an automobile chassis and powered by a 350ci Chevrolet engine.

As with the first film, the novelization of the sequel was credited to Joan Wilder, the character played by Kathleen Turner; both books were actually ghostwritten by Catherine Lanigan.

The Jewel of the Nile was the final film released on the RCA SelectaVision CED video format. It was also released in other media formats.

== Soundtrack ==
"When the Going Gets Tough, the Tough Get Going", performed by Billy Ocean, and "The Jewel of the Nile", performed by Precious Wilson, play in the end credits and during the film respectively. The film itself makes a tongue-in-cheek reference to the song’s title when Joan quips to Jack aboard their yacht, “When the going gets tough… I don’t know what the tough do.” Douglas, Turner, and DeVito also co-starred with Ocean in the MTV music video of the same name. The soundtrack features 1980s rap group Whodini and their single "Freaks Come Out at Night" as Michael Douglas and company make their way through the desert on camel back as well as "Party (No Sheep Is Safe Tonight)" by The Willesden Dodgers during the campfire party scene.

Arista released a soundtrack album on record, cassette and compact disc.

1. "When the Going Gets Tough, the Tough Get Going" – Billy Ocean (4:09)
2. "I'm in Love" – Ruby Turner (3:30)
3. "African Breeze" – Hugh Masekela and Jonathan Butler (6:00)
4. "Party (No Sheep Is Safe Tonight)" – The Willesden Dodgers (5:10)
5. "Freaks Come Out at Night" – Whodini (4:44)
6. "The Jewel of the Nile" – Precious Wilson (4:18)
7. "Legion (Here I Come)" – Mark Shreeve (4:49)
8. "Nubian Dance" – The Nubians (3:35)
9. "Love Theme" – Jack Nitzsche (2:26)
10. "The Plot Thickens" – Jack Nitzsche (4:15)

=== Charts ===
Chart (1986)	Peak position
Australia (Kent Music Report)	34
Canada Top Albums/CDs (RPM)	70
Dutch Albums (Album Top 100)	58
Swedish Albums (Sverigetopplistan)	36
US Billboard 200	55

== Reception ==
While The Jewel of the Nile grossed almost as much as its predecessor, the film was much less successful critically and effectively killed the franchise.

Critics felt the film was loaded with numerous plot holes and that it lacked the first film's original charm. The New York Times opened its review by writing, "There's nothing in The Jewel of the Nile that wasn't funnier or more fanciful in Romancing the Stone." Roger Ebert agreed that "... it is not quite the equal of Romancing the Stone," but praised the interplay between Douglas and Turner. "It seems clear," he wrote, "that they like each other and are having fun during the parade of ludicrous situations in the movie, and their chemistry is sometimes more entertaining than the contrivances of the plot."

Colin Greenland reviewed The Jewel of the Nile for White Dwarf #77, and stated that "The Jewel of the Nile is the sequel to Romancing the Stone, another adventure fantasy with just the right pinch of preposterousness. Against all odds, this is a sequel as enjoyable and endearing as the original."

The Jewel of the Nile holds a rating of 50% on Rotten Tomatoes based on 28 reviews. The critical consensus reads: "The sense of romantic spark has waned and the prevalence of stereotypes has grown in Jewel of the Nile, although there is still plenty of swooning action for fans of the first adventure." Metacritic, which uses a weighted average, assigned the film a score of 53 out of 100, based on 11 critics, indicating "mixed or average" reviews.

Then-U.S. President Ronald Reagan viewed this film at Camp David in January 1986.

The film opened December 11, 1985 on 1,106 screens in the United States and Canada and grossed $6,645,455 in its opening 3-day weekend, placing second behind Rocky IV with $7.2 million, and $8,024,640 in its first 5 days. It went on to gross $76 million in the United States and Canada and $20 million overseas, for a worldwide total of $96 million.

== Unproduced sequels ==
Talk of a third film, again starring Douglas, Turner and DeVito, never got beyond a draft. In The Crimson Eagle, Jack and Joan take their two teenage kids to Thailand where they are blackmailed into stealing a priceless statue. The project languished until 1997, when Douglas as tentative producer announced he was no longer interested.

In 2005 and again in 2008, Douglas was working on a second sequel, entitled Racing the Monsoon, although there have been no further developments in recent years. Since 2007, Fox considered a remake of Romancing the Stone with the possibility of a "reboot" of a series. The roles of Jack and Joan would be filled by Taylor Kitsch (or Gerard Butler) and Katherine Heigl. By 2011, the remake was re-worked as a television series.

== See also ==
- High Risk (1981)
- Green Ice (1981)
- Miracles (1986)
- Florida Straits (1986)
- The Lost City (2022)

== Sources ==
- Eliot, Marc. Michael Douglas: A Biography. New York: Three Rivers Press, 2013. ISBN 978-0-3079-5237-0.
- Solomon, Aubrey. Twentieth Century-Fox: A Corporate and Financial History (The Scarecrow Filmmakers Series). Lanham, Maryland: Scarecrow Press, 1988. ISBN 978-0-8108-4244-1.
- Turner, Kathleen. Send Yourself Roses: Thoughts on My Life, Love, and Leading Roles. New York: Springboard Press, 2008. ISBN 978-0-4465-8112-7.
