= Lawrence Konner =

American screenwriter (born 1950)

- Born: 1950 (age 75–76); United States
- Occupation: Screenwriter
- Spouse(s): Ronnie Wenker (divorced) Zoe Heller (m. 2006)
- Children: Jennifer and Jeremy and 2 other daughters

Lawrence Konner (born 1950) is an American screenwriter, producer, and film director. Konner has written over 25 feature films, including Mona Lisa Smile, Planet of the Apes, The Legend of Billie Jean, The Jewel of the Nile, and Star Trek VI: The Undiscovered Country. Konner's writing for television spans over 45 years. His works include the HBO series The Sopranos, for which Konner earned an Emmy nomination in 2001, and Boardwalk Empire, for which he received the WGA Award for Best New Series in 2010. He was also nominated for an Emmy for his work as writer and executive producer on the 2016 miniseries Roots. Other television credits include Family and Little House on the Prairie.

In 1995, Konner produced and directed a documentary short, One Thing I Know, which premiered at the Sundance Film Festival, screened at the Cannes Film Festival, and won the Special Jury Prize at the USA Film Festival. In 2003, through his independent company, The Documentary Campaign, Konner produced Persons of Interest, a feature-length documentary about the illegal detentions of thousands of Muslims in the aftermath of the September 11 attacks, which premiered in competition at the Sundance Film Festival and won the Amnesty International Humanitarian Award. In 2005, Konner produced the film Zizek!, a documentary that follows the philosopher Slavoj Žižek on a worldwide speaking tour.

Konner has taught screenwriting at Princeton University, Columbia University and Vassar College.

== Biography ==
=== Screenwriter ===
Konner was raised in a Jewish family. He began his career as a writer for television of the shows Little House on the Prairie, Family and Remington Steele.

He wrote a number of episodes of the HBO series The Sopranos, one of which was nominated for an Emmy Award for Outstanding Achievement in Dramatic Writing. He was a writer and co-executive producer for the HBO series Boardwalk Empire. Konner was a writer and co-executive producer of the series Magic City, which premiered in January 2012 on the Starz channel.

In collaboration with Konner's movie-writing partner Mark Rosenthal, the two men first worked together on the motion picture The Legend of Billie Jean. This was followed by the films The Jewel of the Nile, Superman IV: The Quest for Peace, and Star Trek VI: The Undiscovered Country, as well as the rebooted versions of The Beverly Hillbillies, Mighty Joe Young and Planet of the Apes. Other screenplays include Mona Lisa Smile, Flicka, and Mercury Rising.

=== Board of Directors of the Writers Guild of America ===
Konner was a member of the Board of Directors of The Writers Guild of America, and a former Creative Director at the Sundance Institute. He is a member of The Academy of Motion Picture Arts and Sciences.

== Personal life ==
His first wife was Ronnie Wenker; they had Jennifer and Jeremy before divorcing. In 2006, he married journalist and novelist Zoë Heller in a "minimally" Jewish ceremony; the couple had two daughters and separated in 2010.

== Filmography ==
- Family (1976) (TV)
- Little House on the Prairie (1977) (TV)
- Cagney and Lacey (1983) (TV)
- Remington Steele (1984) (TV)
- The Legend of Billie Jean (with Mark Rosenthal) (1985)
- The Jewel of the Nile (1985) (with Mark Rosenthal) (1985)
- Superman IV: The Quest for Peace (1987) (with Mark Rosenthal)
- The In Crowd (1988) (with Mark Rosenthal)
- Almost Grown (1988) (TV) (creator with David Chase)
- Working Girl (1990) (TV)
- Desperate Hours (1990) (with Mark Rosenthal)
- Sometimes They Come Back (1991) (TV) (with Mark Rosenthal)
- Star Trek VI: The Undiscovered Country (1991) (with Mark Rosenthal)
- For Love or Money (1993) (with Mark Rosenthal)
- The Beverly Hillbillies (1993) (with Mark Rosenthal)
- One Thing I Know (1995)
- Mercury Rising (1998) (with Mark Rosenthal)
- Mighty Joe Young (1998) (with Mark Rosenthal)
- Planet of the Apes (2001) (with Mark Rosenthal)
- The Sopranos (2001–2002) (TV)
- Person of Interest (2003) (producer only)
- Mona Lisa Smile (2003) (with Mark Rosenthal)
- Zizek! (2005) (producer only)
- Flicka (2006) (with Mark Rosenthal)
- The Sorcerer's Apprentice (2010) (with Mark Rosenthal)
- Boardwalk Empire (2010)
- The Many Saints of Newark (2021) (with David Chase)
