= Mighty Joe Young (1998 film) =

1998 American adventure film by Ron Underwood

- Theatrical release poster
- Directed by: Ron Underwood
- Screenplay by: Mark Rosenthal; Lawrence Konner
- Based on: Mighty Joe Young; 1949 film by Merian C. Cooper; Ruth Rose
- Produced by: Ted Hartley; Tom Jacobson
- Starring: Bill Paxton; Charlize Theron; Rade Šerbedžija; Naveen Andrews; Regina King; David Paymer
- Cinematography: Donald Peterman; Oliver Wood
- Edited by: Paul Hirsch
- Music by: James Horner
- Production companies: Walt Disney Pictures; RKO Pictures; The Jacobson Company
- Distributed by: Buena Vista Pictures Distribution
- Release date: December 25, 1998
- Running time: 114 minutes
- Country: United States
- Language: English
- Budget: $90 million
- Box office: $50.6 million (US)

Mighty Joe Young is a 1998 American epic adventure film and remake of the 1949 film of the same title about a giant mountain gorilla brought to a wildlife preserve by a young woman who raised him and a zoologist to protect him from the threat of poachers until one decides to seek his revenge and capture and kill Joe. It was directed by Ron Underwood and starred Bill Paxton, Charlize Theron, Rade Šerbedžija, Naveen Andrews, Peter Firth, Regina King and David Paymer. Creature-suit actor John Alexander played the title character, who in this version, is much larger than the original. The film was released by Buena Vista Pictures Distribution on December 25, 1998, received mixed reviews and was a box-office bomb, grossing only $50.6 million in the United States against a $90 million production budget.

== Plot ==
As a child, Jill Young and her primatologist mother Ruth, study mountain gorillas in the Virunga Mountains in Uganda. Jill befriends an infant gorilla and names him "Joe". Andrei Strasser and a group of poachers storm the mountains to capture the gorillas for illegal profit. Ruth's friend Kweli alerts her about the men as she is putting Jill to bed. Ruth heads into the mountains to protect the gorillas, while Jill follows. Strasser kills Joe’s mother and mortally wounds Ruth. Joe retaliates by biting off Strasser's trigger finger and thumb, causing Strasser to swear revenge. As Ruth dies, she makes Jill promise to protect Joe.

12 years later, Joe has grown to be 15 feet tall and weight 2000 pounds due to gigantism. He is viewed as an outsider by the gorillas, who will not accept him in their troop. Gregg O'Hara, a wildlife refuge director at a Los Angeles animal conservatory, convinces Jill it would be safer to relocate Joe there due to his vulnerability to poachers.

Joe is taken to the conservatory, where the refuge staff put Jill in charge of Joe. Strasser now runs a fraudulent animal preserve in Botswana, while secretly selling animal organs on the black market. He is eager for revenge after seeing Joe on a news report. Jill does not recognize Strasser while he attempts to convince her that Joe would be better off in his own wildlife preserve in Africa. During a night party, Strasser's henchman Garth sneaks into Joe's enclosure, and uses a poacher's noisemaker to provoke Joe into a frenzy. Joe trashes the party and is imprisoned in a concrete bunker.

Joe is declared an uncontrollable public safety hazard, and ordered to be euthanized. In order to save Joe's life, Jill accepts Strasser's offer. She and the refuge staff secretly smuggle Joe out into a truck. Gregg kisses her goodbye. After Jill leaves, the poacher's noisemaker is discovered. Gregg realizes Jill and Joe are in danger and pursues the truck. On the way to the airport, Jill notices Strasser's missing fingers and recognizes him as the poacher in her childhood. She escapes by jumping off the truck onto Hollywood Boulevard. Joe tilts the truck onto its side and flees. Being on the loose, Joe is pursed by several helicopters, as he makes his way to an amusement park at the Santa Monica Pier, attracted by the lights.

Gregg finds Jill, and they track Joe to the amusement park where he is playfully wreaking havoc. Strasser arrives and attempts to shoot Jill. Horrified by Strasser's eagerness to kill an innocent young woman, Garth intervened by pushing the rifle barrel away, causing the shot to miss and hit an electrical box, igniting the ferris wheel. In response to this defiance, Strasser knocks Garth unconscious. While Jill and Gregg help evacuate the riders, a young boy is stranded at the top. Strasser attempts to kill Jill for the second time, but Joe grabs and throws him onto a power line. Strasser falls onto a transformer and is electrocuted to death.

Joe notices the young boy up on the ferris wheel, and climbs to rescue him. Jill convinces the police not to shoot Joe as he is trying to save the child. Joe grabs the young boy and falls off the collapsing ferris wheel. Joe and the boy survives. Jill tells everyone that they need to raise money to open a reserve for Joe. The boy thanks Joe for saving him, and then donates to Jill, prompting others to contribute.

Joe is returned to the Pangani Mountains where Jill and Gregg open the "Joe Young Reserve". Joe runs into the jungle, embracing his freedom.

== Cast ==
- Bill Paxton as Professor Gregg O'Hara, is a zoologist who finds Joe in the wild and develops a relationship with Jill.
- Charlize Theron as Jill Young, is a young woman who is Joe's best friend and protector after they were both orphaned by the same poacher.
  - Mika Boorem as Young Jill Young
- Rade Serbedzija as Andrei Strasser, is a ruthless Romanian poacher, who is seeking retribution on Joe after he bit off his thumb and index finger when he was an infant. He is also the poacher who murdered both Jill and Joe's mothers.
- Regina King as Cecily Banks, is a zoologist and Gregg's friend working at the wildlife preserve, who immediately befriends Jill and Joe.
- Peter Firth as Garth, is Strasser's South African lieutenant who is not as ruthless as Strasser.
- Naveen Andrews as Pindi, is a local guide and employee of Strasser's.
- David Paymer as Harry Ruben, is the supervisor at the wildlife preserve to which Joe is relieved.
- Robert Wisdom as Kweli, is a local African man, who was a friend of Ruth's and a surrogate father figure to Jill.
- Christian Clemenson as Jack
- Geoffrey Blake as Vern
- Lawrence Pressman as Doctor Elliot Baker
- John Alexander as Mighty Joe Young, is a mountain gorilla that due to a rare form of gigantism is 15 feet (4.6 m) tall and weighs 2,000 pounds (910 kg) and is the sacred guardian of the mountain. He is Jill's best friend since they were orphaned by the same poacher. Joe was designed and created by special makeup-effects legend Rick Baker.
  - Verne Troyer as Baby Joe Young
  - Mighty Joe Young puppeteers: Mark Setrakian, Mike Elizalde, Jurgen Heimann, Steven Sherman
- Linda Purl as Doctor Ruth Young, Jill's primatologist mother, who was killed along with Joe's mother by Strasser.
- Cory Buck as Jason, is a young boy who gets caught on the burning Ferris wheel.
- Liz Georges as Jason's mother
- Richard Riehle as Commander Gorman
- Ray Harryhausen as Gentleman at Party
- Terry Moore as Elegant Woman at Party
- Judson Mills as Impatient Driver
- Tony Genaro as Boxer Shorts Man
- Marguerite Moreau as Lisa
- Tracey Walter as Conservancy Guard
- Larry Brandenburg as Animal Control Duty Officer
- Damien Leake as Cop
- Richard McGonagle as Panda Owner
- Reno Wilson as Poacher
- Dina Merrill as Society Woman
- Lily Mariye as Hiroko
- Debbie Lee Carrington as Other Gorilla
- Scarlett Pomers as Charlotte

== Production ==
The project was set up in March 1995 by studio chairman Joe Roth and Walt Disney Pictures president David Vogel. Preproduction started with Rick Baker designing the gorilla and Dream Quest Images in charge of computer-generated imagery (CGI). Theron was cast as Jill in April 1997.

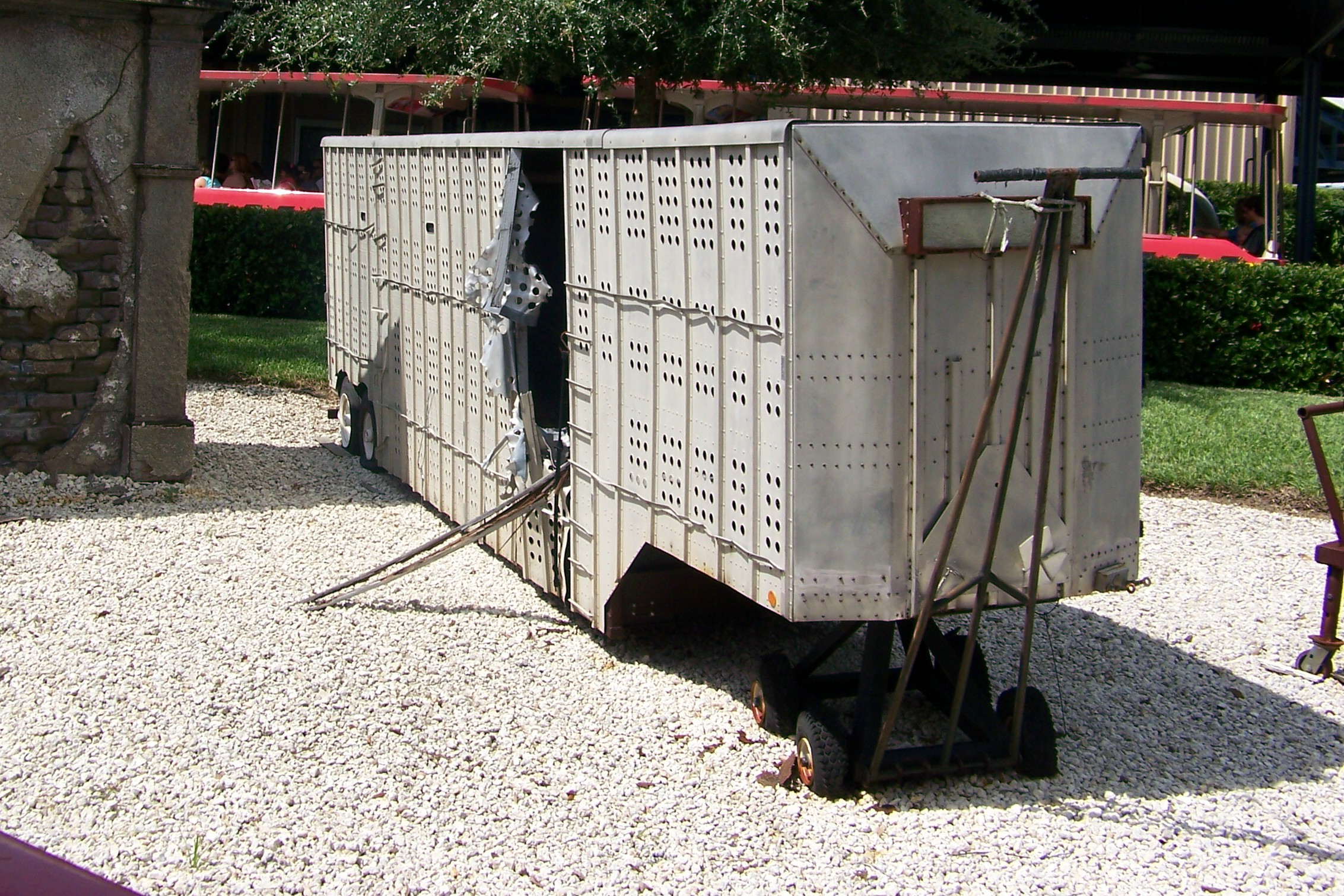
A model of the trailer used in a scene from the film, as seen at a former attraction at Disney's Hollywood Studios in Orlando, Florida

Cinematographer Donald Peterman suffered head injuries, a broken leg, and broken ribs in a crane accident on the film set in 1997, when his camera platform plummeted 18 feet (5.5 m) to the ground when the crane snapped. Ray de la Motte, the camera operator who was sitting next to Peterman on the crane, was also injured in the accident.

In most of the film, Joe was portrayed by creature-suit performer John Alexander, who wore a radio-controlled animatronic gorilla mask and full body suit created by special makeup-effects artist Rick Baker and his crew at Cinovation Studios. To achieve those scenes, Alexander often acted on miniature sets surrounded by blue screen; special-effects house DreamQuest Images then composited him into footage shot earlier. Joe as an infant was performed by Verne Troyer. For certain scenes, the filmmakers used three full-sized animatronics (one in quadruped, one sitting down, and one in a dead position) also created by Baker's crew. For the digital Joe, special-effects houses DreamQuest Images and Industrial Light and Magic worked on different scenes, using the same model provided by Baker. Many of these performances were achieved by key-frame animation, but to portray the digital Joe running and jumping, motion-capture data from an infant chimpanzee were used.

== Music ==
The music for the film was composed by James Horner. The soundtrack was released on December 8, 1998.

Mighty Joe Young: Original Score

Soundtrack album by James Horner
- Released: December 8, 1998
- Recorded: 1998
- Length: 73:01
- Label: Hollywood

James Horner chronology
Back to Titanic (1998)	Mighty Joe Young: Original Score (1998)	Bicentennial Man (1999)

Professional ratings
Review scores
Source	Rating
SoundtrackNet	2.5/5 stars

== Release and reception ==
The film grossed a paltry $50 million against a $90 million production budget and holds a rating of 54% from Rotten Tomatoes based on 54 reviews, with an average rating of 5.9/10. The site's critical consensus is: "Beguiling effects transcend a predictable plot." Metacritic assigned a weighted average rating of 51 out of 100, based on 20 critics, indicating "mixed or average reviews". Audiences polled by CinemaScore gave the film an average grade of "B+" on an A+ to F scale. Roger Ebert of the Chicago Sun-Times gave the film 3 stars out of 4, saying, "Mighty Joe Young is an energetic, robust adventure tale: not too cynical, violent or fragmented for kids, not too tame for adults. After all the calculation behind 'Godzilla' or 'Armageddon,' it has a kind of innocence. It's not about a monster but about a very big, well-meaning gorilla that just wants to be left in peace." Despite giving the film positive reviews, he also pointed out that the romance scenes and villains were only average and by no means exceptional.

Common Sense Media gave the film 4 stars, finding that the "environmentally friendly" film provides "serious food for thought [and] plenty of comic relief," as opposed to the original 1949 RKO film. The reviewer praised the effects and acting that went into Joe's rendition, saying that children will sympathize with the character, as well as with Theron and Paxton's romantic pairing. James Berardinelli also gave the film 3 stars out of 4 and generally positive reviews: "Although Joe's size makes him a monster, his disposition makes him cuddly. Despite not being daring in style or story, Mighty Joe Young is nevertheless a charming and enjoyable adventure, and a rare remake that's better than the original. It may not have the box-office punch to exceed the $100 million mark, but it's good enough to entertain an audience." Colin Fraser of eFilm Critic gave it 3 stars, saying, "Strictly for ten-year-olds, Mighty Joe Young has its ample heart in exactly the right place. After an opening sequence that will have kiddies reaching for Kleenex, the action soon picks up with many a thrill on the way. This is not Jurassic Park however and doesn't really deserve its Academy nomination for effects."

Those who criticized the film included Maitland McDonagh of TV Guide, who gave the film 2.5 stars out of 4, believing it would be too shallow for adult viewers and too serious for children, adding, "Joe himself is an amazing creation—less personable, to be sure—than the original lovelorn King Kong, but a far more fully realized character than any of the flesh-and-blood humans by whom he's surrounded." Paul Clinton of CNN gave it negative reviews, saying, "Great scenery, cartoonish villains, huge leaps of suspended belief, and mouthwatering shots of Charlize Theron are in plentiful supply in Mighty Joe Young. And baby, can this boy travel. He goes from Africa to L.A. in just one dissolve. Then when he escapes, he goes from Hollywood Boulevard to the Los Angeles river to the Pacific Palisades in seconds. If you're not familiar with L.A... trust me... couldn't happen." and "The gorilla is pretty impressive and expressive, but overall it's much ado about—not much. I have a feeling this film will be fairly low on the food chain of 'must see' holiday films."

Stephen Holden of The New York Times gave the film generally unfavorable reviews, saying, "Mighty Joe Young, directed by Ron Underwood from a screenplay by Mark Rosenthal and Lawrence Konner, is saddled with dialogue so wooden that Mr. Paxton and Ms. Theron almost seem animatronic, themselves. Little children won't notice. In Joe, they can identify with the biggest, cuddliest simian toy a six-year-old could ever hope to own." Dustin Putman gave it 2 stars out of 4 and a negative review, saying, "Mighty Joe Young is an agreeable time-waster for older kids (it's much too violent for the youngest viewers) and perhaps some adults, but in a season when children could also choose to see the marvelous The Prince of Egypt and adults could pick any number of far superior films, Mighty Joe Young simply pales in comparison. Although you could certainly do much worse, there is only one really distinctive quality about the film, and that is Charlize Theron's charismatic performance as Jill Young."

Mighty Joe Young also received an Academy Award nomination for Best Visual Effects, losing to What Dreams May Come. Later, director Ron Underwood said: "That experience was a really positive one for me, although it was lengthy; it was a three-year project for me. And I enjoyed all the visual-effects work on Mighty Joe Young and it ended up getting an Academy Award nomination for that."

== See also ==
- List of American films of 1998
- List of fictional primates
- King Kong, 2005 film
