= Mark Rosenthal (filmmaker) =

American screenwriter and film director

Mark David Rosenthal is an American screenwriter and film director. He is also the long-time writing partner of Lawrence Konner. The writing team work together on the films The Legend of Billie Jean, The Jewel of the Nile, Superman IV: The Quest for Peace, and Star Trek VI: The Undiscovered Country, as well as the screenplays for Mona Lisa Smile, Flicka, and Mercury Rising.

== Early life and education ==
Rosenthal was born to a Jewish family in Philadelphia. He holds a Doctor of Arts degree from the University of the Pacific.

== Screenwriting career ==
Rosenthal sold the first screenplay he wrote, which came out theatrically as The Legend of Billie Jean. This was followed by such films as The Jewel of the Nile, The Beverly Hillbillies, Tim Burton's Planet of the Apes, Mona Lisa Smile, Mighty Joe Young and The Sorcerer's Apprentice. He also did uncredited work on I, Robot and Eragon. Rosenthal co-wrote (with Konner) and directed The In Crowd for Orion Pictures.

== Other appearances ==
Rosenthal is a voting member of the Academy of Motion Pictures Arts & Sciences. and was featured in the documentaries Tales From The Script: 50 Hollywood Screenwriters Share Their Stories and Electric Boogaloo: The Wild, Untold Story of Cannon Films, where he details his experiences working on Superman IV: The Quest for Peace.

== Superman IV: The Quest for Peace ==
Rosenthal recorded a DVD commentary for Superman IV: The Quest for Peace for the Deluxe Edition of the film in 2006. He discussed the film's original intentions and deleted scenes. Rosenthal has also described the final film as production company Cannon Films stabbing star Christopher Reeve in the back. According to Rosenthal, Reeve and director Sidney J. Furie begged Cannon Films to film a sequence in New York City, in front of the real United Nations Building, because filmgoers were very familiar with that location, but the Milton Keynes setting looked more like a municipal auditorium. However, Cannon refused because they were "pinching pennies at every step". Rosenthal also revealed that he and writer Lawrence Konner wanted Reeve to play Nuclear Man as well as his dual roles of Superman and Clark Kent in the film. They imagined the villain being a darker version of the hero in the cloning process. The effect would have been costly to achieve and the idea had already been explored in Superman III. Therefore, Cannon hired actor Mark Pillow for the part of Nuclear Man. Also according to Rosenthal, there are approximately 45 minutes of the film that have not been seen by the public after they were deleted, following a failed Southern California test screening.

== Filmography ==
- The Legend of Billie Jean (1985)
- The Jewel of the Nile (1985)
- Superman IV: The Quest for Peace (1987)
- The In Crowd (1988)
- Desperate Hours (1990)
- Sometimes They Come Back (TV Movie) (1991)
- Star Trek VI: The Undiscovered Country (Story by) (1991)
- For Love or Money (1993)
- The Beverley Hillbillies (1993)
- Mercury Rising (1998)
- Mighty Joe Young (1998)
- Planet of the Apes (2001)
- Mona Lisa Smile (2003)
- Flicka (2006)
- The Sorcerer’s Apprentice (Story by) (2010)
- Roots (TV Series) (Writer) ( Executive Producer) (2016)

== See also ==
- Lawrence Konner
