= 44th Saturn Awards =

2018 science fiction awards ceremony

- Date: June 27, 2018
- Site: Burbank, California, U.S.
- Hosted by: Jonah Ray

Highlights
- Most awards: Film: Black Panther (5); Television: Better Call Saul (3); Twin Peaks: The Return (3)
- Most nominations: Film: Black Panther (14); Television: The Walking Dead (7)

The 44th Saturn Awards, presented by the Academy of Science Fiction, Fantasy and Horror Films and honoring the best in science fiction, fantasy, horror, and other genres belonging to genre fiction in film, television, home entertainment and local stage production from February 2017 to February 2018, were held on June 27, 2018, in Burbank, California, and hosted by comedian Jonah Ray. Nominations were announced on March 15, 2018.

Black Panther led the nominations for film with fourteen, becoming the second most nominated film in the awards' history behind Star Wars: The Force Awakens (2015) with fifteen, as the former scored nominations in every category for eligibility (2019's Avengers: Endgame would also receive fourteen nominations the following ceremony, sharing Black Panther's nomination record as the second/third most nominated film in the awards' history). It was followed by Star Wars: The Last Jedi with thirteen nominations, and Blade Runner 2049 and The Shape of Water with nine nominations each.

The Walking Dead led the nominations for television for the fourth year in a row with seven, followed by streaming newcomer Star Trek: Discovery and the limited series Twin Peaks: The Return with five each. Seven individuals earned two nominations each, including double writing nominations for Michael Green (for his work on Blade Runner 2049 and Logan, sharing the nods with other writers), and two acting nominations for both film and television for Danai Gurira (for her performances in Black Panther and The Walking Dead, winning for the former).

For film, Black Panther won the most awards with five, including Best Comic-to-Motion Picture Release and Best Film Director (Ryan Coogler), followed by Star Wars: The Last Jedi with three and Coco with two. For television, Better Call Saul and Twin Peaks: The Return won the most awards with three each (ending The Walking Dead's four-year long streak as the top-winning series), followed by Star Trek: Discovery and The Walking Dead with two each. However, Rian Johnson's win for Best Writing for Star Wars: The Last Jedi caused some backlash from fans, who expressed their disdain with the decision on social media.

Other notable wins include Mark Hamill's record-tying third Best Actor in a Film win for Star Wars: The Last Jedi (thirty-four years after his second win for 1983's Return of the Jedi), making him the first person to have won three Saturn Awards for the same role in film (Robert Downey Jr. would tie this record the following year for 2019's Avengers: Endgame), and Tom Holland's second consecutive win for Best Performance by a Younger Actor in a Film for Spider-Man: Homecoming (2017), making him the first performer to win the category twice for the same role or to win it in two consecutive years; Holland won a third the following year for 2019's Spider-Man: Far From Home, surpassing his own record.

== Winners and nominees ==
=== Film ===
Best Comic-to-Motion Picture Release	Best Science Fiction Film Release
Black Panther; Guardians of the Galaxy Vol. 2; Logan; Spider-Man: Homecoming; Thor: Ragnarok; Wonder Woman	Blade Runner 2049; Alien: Covenant; Life; Star Wars: The Last Jedi; Valerian and the City of a Thousand Planets; War for the Planet of the Apes
Best Fantasy Film Release	Best Horror Film Release
The Shape of Water; Beauty and the Beast; Downsizing; Jumanji: Welcome to the Jungle; Kong: Skull Island; Paddington 2	Get Out; 47 Meters Down; Annabelle: Creation; Better Watch Out; It; Mother!
Best Action / Adventure Film Release	Best Thriller Film Release
The Greatest Showman; Baby Driver; Dunkirk; The Fate of the Furious; Hostiles; Kingsman: The Golden Circle	Three Billboards Outside Ebbing, Missouri; Brawl in Cell Block 99; Murder on the Orient Express; The Post; Suburbicon; Wind River
Best Animated Film Release	Best International Film Release
Coco; The Boss Baby; Cars 3; Despicable Me 3; Your Name	Baahubali 2: The Conclusion; Brimstone; The Lodgers; The Man Who Invented Christmas; The Square; Wolf Warrior 2
Best Film Director	Best Film Writing
Ryan Coogler – Black Panther; Guillermo del Toro – The Shape of Water; Patty Jenkins – Wonder Woman; Rian Johnson – Star Wars: The Last Jedi; Jordan Peele – Get Out; Matt Reeves – War for the Planet of the Apes; Denis Villeneuve – Blade Runner 2049	Star Wars: The Last Jedi – Rian Johnson; Black Panther – Ryan Coogler and Joe Robert Cole; Blade Runner 2049 – Michael Green and Hampton Fancher; Get Out – Jordan Peele; Logan – Scott Frank, Michael Green, and James Mangold; The Shape of Water – Guillermo del Toro and Vanessa Taylor; Wonder Woman – Jason Fuchs, Allan Heinberg, and Zack Snyder
Best Actor in a Film	Best Actress in a Film
Mark Hamill – Star Wars: The Last Jedi as Luke Skywalker; Chadwick Boseman – Black Panther as T'Challa / Black Panther; Ryan Gosling – Blade Runner 2049 as K; Hugh Jackman – Logan as Logan / X-24; Daniel Kaluuya – Get Out as Chris Washington; Andy Serkis – War for the Planet of the Apes as Caesar; Vince Vaughn – Brawl in Cell Block 99 as Bradley Thomas	Gal Gadot – Wonder Woman as Diana Prince / Wonder Woman; Sally Hawkins – The Shape of Water as Elisa Esposito; Frances McDormand – Three Billboards Outside Ebbing, Missouri as Mildred Hayes; Lupita Nyong'o – Black Panther as Nakia; Rosamund Pike – Hostiles as Rosalee Quaid; Daisy Ridley – Star Wars: The Last Jedi as Rey; Emma Watson – Beauty and the Beast as Belle
Best Supporting Actor in a Film	Best Supporting Actress in a Film
Patrick Stewart – Logan as Charles Xavier / Professor X; Harrison Ford – Blade Runner 2049 as Rick Deckard; Michael B. Jordan – Black Panther as N'Jadaka / Erik "Killmonger" Stevens; Michael Keaton – Spider-Man: Homecoming as Adrian Toomes / Vulture; Chris Pine – Wonder Woman as Steve Trevor; Michael Rooker – Guardians of the Galaxy Vol. 2 as Yondu; Bill Skarsgård – It as It / Pennywise the Dancing Clown	Danai Gurira – Black Panther as Okoye; Ana de Armas – Blade Runner 2049 as Joi; Carrie Fisher – Star Wars: The Last Jedi as General Leia Organa (posthumous); Lois Smith – Marjorie Prime as Marjorie; Octavia Spencer – The Shape of Water as Zelda Delilah Fuller; Tessa Thompson – Thor: Ragnarok as Valkyrie; Kelly Marie Tran – Star Wars: The Last Jedi as Rose Tico
Best Performance by a Younger Actor in a Film	Best Film Editing
Tom Holland – Spider-Man: Homecoming as Peter Parker / Spider-Man; Dafne Keen – Logan as Laura Kinney / X-23; Sophia Lillis – It as Beverly Marsh; Millicent Simmonds – Wonderstruck as Rose; Jacob Tremblay – Wonder as August "Auggie" Pullman; Letitia Wright – Black Panther as Shuri; Zendaya – Spider-Man: Homecoming as Michelle	Star Wars: The Last Jedi – Bob Ducsay; Black Panther – Debbie Berman and Michael P. Shawver; The Fate of the Furious – Paul Rubell and Christian Wagner; Get Out – Gregory Plotkin; Logan – Michael McCusker and Dirk Westervelt; The Shape of Water – Sidney Wolinsky
Best Film Music	Best Film Production Design
Coco – Michael Giacchino; Black Panther – Ludwig Göransson; The Greatest Showman – John Debney and Joseph Trapanese; The Shape of Water – Alexandre Desplat; Star Wars: The Last Jedi – John Williams; Wonderstruck – Carter Burwell	Black Panther – Hannah Beachler; Beauty and the Beast – Sarah Greenwood; Blade Runner 2049 – Dennis Gassner; The Shape of Water – Paul Denham Austerberry; Star Wars: The Last Jedi – Rick Heinrichs; Valerian and the City of a Thousand Planets – Hugues Tissandier
Best Film Costume Design	Best Film Make-up
Beauty and the Beast – Jacqueline Durran; Black Panther – Ruth E. Carter; The Greatest Showman – Ellen Mirojnick; Star Wars: The Last Jedi – Michael Kaplan; Valerian and the City of a Thousand Planets – Olivier Bériot; Wonder Woman – Lindy Hemming	Black Panther – Ken Diaz and Joel Harlow; Blade Runner 2049 – Donald Mowat; Guardians of the Galaxy Vol. 2 – John Blake and Brian Sipe; It – Alec Gillis, Sean Sansom, Tom Woodruff Jr., and Shane Zander; The Shape of Water – Mike Hill and Shane Mahan; Star Wars: The Last Jedi – Peter Swords King and Neal Scanlan; Wonder – Arjen Tuiten
Best Film Special / Visual Effects	Best Independent Film Release
Guardians of the Galaxy Vol. 2 – Jonathan Fawkner, Dan Sudick, Christopher Townsend, and Guy Williams; Black Panther – Geoffrey Baumann, Craig Hammack, and Dan Sudick; Blade Runner 2049 – Richard R. Hoover, Paul Lambert, Gerd Nefzer, and John Nelson; Kong: Skull Island – Scott Benza, Mike Meinardus, Stephen Rosenbaum, and Jeff White; Star Wars: The Last Jedi – Chris Corbould, Ben Morris, Mike Mulholland, and Neal Scanlan; War for the Planet of the Apes – Daniel Barrett, Dan Lemmon, Joe Letteri, and Joel Whist	Wonder; I, Tonya; LBJ; Lucky; Professor Marston and the Wonder Women; Super Dark Times; Wonderstruck

=== Television ===
==== Programs ====
Best Superhero Television Series	Best Science Fiction Television Series
The Flash (The CW); Agents of S.H.I.E.L.D. (ABC); Arrow (The CW); Black Lightning (The CW); Gotham (Fox); Legends of Tomorrow (The CW); Supergirl (The CW)	The Orville (Fox); The 100 (The CW); Colony (USA Network); Doctor Who (BBC America); The Expanse (Syfy); Salvation (CBS); The X-Files (Fox)
Best Fantasy Television Series	Best Horror Television Series
Outlander (Starz); American Gods (Starz); Game of Thrones (HBO); The Good Place (NBC); Knightfall (History); The Librarians (TNT); The Magicians (Syfy)	The Walking Dead (AMC); American Horror Story: Cult (FX); Ash vs Evil Dead (Starz); Fear the Walking Dead (AMC); Preacher (AMC); The Strain (FX); Teen Wolf (MTV)
Best Action / Thriller Television Series	Best Television Presentation
Better Call Saul (AMC); The Alienist (TNT); Animal Kingdom (TNT); Fargo (FX); Into the Badlands (AMC); Mr. Mercedes (Audience); Riverdale (The CW)	Twin Peaks: The Return (Showtime); Channel Zero (Syfy); Descendants 2 (Disney Channel); Doctor Who: Twice Upon a Time (BBC America); Mystery Science Theater 3000: The Return (Netflix); Okja (Netflix); The Sinner (USA Network)
Best Animated Series or Film on Television	Best New Media Television Series
Star Wars Rebels (Disney XD); Archer (FX); BoJack Horseman (Netflix); Cloudy with a Chance of Meatballs (Cartoon Network); Family Guy (Fox); Rick and Morty (Adult Swim); The Simpsons (Fox)	Star Trek: Discovery (CBS All Access); Altered Carbon (Netflix); Black Mirror (Netflix); Electric Dreams (Prime Video); The Handmaid's Tale (Hulu); Mindhunter (Netflix); Stranger Things (Netflix)
Best New Media Superhero Series
The Punisher (Netflix); The Defenders (Netflix); Future Man (Hulu); Iron Fist (Netflix); Runaways (Hulu); The Tick (Prime Video)

==== Acting ====
Best Actor on a Television Series	Best Actress on a Television Series
Kyle MacLachlan as FBI Special Agent Dale Cooper on Twin Peaks: The Return (Showtime); Jon Bernthal as Frank Castle / Punisher on The Punisher (Netflix); Bruce Campbell as Ash Williams on Ash vs Evil Dead (Starz); Sam Heughan as Jamie Fraser on Outlander (Starz); Jason Isaacs as Captain Gabriel Lorca on Star Trek: Discovery (CBS All Access); Andrew Lincoln as Rick Grimes on The Walking Dead (AMC); Seth MacFarlane as Captain Ed Mercer on The Orville (Fox); Ricky Whittle as Shadow Moon on American Gods (Starz)	Sonequa Martin-Green as Michael Burnham on Star Trek: Discovery (CBS All Access); Gillian Anderson as FBI Special Agent Dana Scully on The X-Files (Fox); Caitríona Balfe as Claire Fraser on Outlander (Starz); Melissa Benoist as Kara Danvers / Supergirl on Supergirl (The CW); Lena Headey as Cersei Lannister on Game of Thrones (HBO); Adrianne Palicki as Commander Kelly Grayson on The Orville (Fox); Sarah Paulson as Susan Atkins / Ally Mayfair-Richards on American Horror Story: Cult (FX); Mary Elizabeth Winstead as Nikki Swango on Fargo (FX)
Best Supporting Actor on a Television Series	Best Supporting Actress on a Television Series
Michael McKean as Chuck McGill on Better Call Saul (AMC); Nikolaj Coster-Waldau as Jaime Lannister on Game of Thrones (HBO); Miguel Ferrer as Albert Rosenfield on Twin Peaks: The Return (Showtime) (posthumous); Kit Harington as Jon Snow on Game of Thrones (HBO); Doug Jones as Saru on Star Trek: Discovery (CBS All Access); Christian Kane as Jacob Stone on The Librarians (TNT); Khary Payton as King Ezekiel on The Walking Dead (AMC); Evan Peters as Kai Anderson, Marshall Applewhite, Jesus, Jim Jones, David Koresh, Charles Manson, and Andy Warhol on American Horror Story: Cult (FX)	Rhea Seehorn as Kim Wexler on Better Call Saul (AMC); Odette Annable as Samantha Arias / Reign on Supergirl (The CW); Dakota Fanning as Sara Howard on The Alienist (TNT); Danai Gurira as Michonne on The Walking Dead (AMC); Melissa McBride as Carol Peletier on The Walking Dead (AMC); Candice Patton as Iris West-Allen on The Flash (The CW); Adina Porter as Beverly Hope on American Horror Story: Cult (FX); Krysten Ritter as Jessica Jones on The Defenders (Netflix)
Best Performance by a Younger Actor on a Television Series	Best Guest Starring Performance on a Television Series
Chandler Riggs as Carl Grimes on The Walking Dead (AMC); KJ Apa as Archie Andrews on Riverdale (The CW); Millie Bobby Brown as Eleven on Stranger Things (Netflix); Max Charles as Zach Goodweather on The Strain (FX); Alycia Debnam-Carey as Alicia Clark on Fear the Walking Dead (AMC); David Mazouz as Bruce Wayne on Gotham (Fox); Lili Reinhart as Betty Cooper on Riverdale (The CW); Cole Sprouse as Jughead Jones on Riverdale (The CW)	David Lynch as FBI Deputy Director Gordon Cole on Twin Peaks: The Return (Showtime); Bryan Cranston as Silas Herrick on Electric Dreams (Prime Video); Michael Greyeyes as Qaletaqa Walker on Fear the Walking Dead (AMC); Jeffrey Dean Morgan as Negan on The Walking Dead (AMC); Rachel Nichols as Nicole Noone on The Librarians (TNT); Jesse Plemons as Robert Daly on Black Mirror (Netflix); Hartley Sawyer as Ralph Dibny / Elongated Man on The Flash (The CW); Michelle Yeoh as Captain Philippa Georgiou on Star Trek: Discovery (CBS All Access)

=== Home Entertainment ===
Best DVD or Blu-ray Release	Best DVD or Blu-ray Classic Film Release
Dave Made a Maze; 2:22; Colossal; Cult of Chucky; Devil's Whisper; The Man from Earth: Holocene	Lifeboat; Caltiki – The Immortal Monster; Deluge; The Mephisto Waltz; The Old Dark House; Tobor the Great
Best DVD or Blu-ray Special Edition Release	Best DVD or Blu-ray Television Series Release
Night of the Living Dead (The Criterion Collection); Lost Horizon (80th Anniversary); The Lost World (Deluxe Edition); Re-Animator (Special Edition); Speed Racer (Collector's Edition); Suspiria (40th Anniversary Edition)	American Gods (Season One); Grimm (The Complete Collection); The Rockford Files (The Complete Series); Twin Peaks: A Limited Event Series; The Vampire Diaries (The Complete Series); Westworld (Season One: The Maze)
Best DVD or Blu-ray Collection Release
Dracula: Complete Legacy Collection (Dracula, Dracula's Daughter, Son of Dracula, House of Frankenstein, House of Dracula, and Abbott and Costello Meet Frankenstein); Abbott and Costello Rarities; Adventures of Captain Marvel: 12 Chapter Serial; Christopher Nolan 4K Collection (Batman Begins, The Prestige, The Dark Knight, Inception, The Dark Knight Rises, Interstellar, and Dunkirk); Fritz Lang: The Silent Films (The Plague of Florence, The Spiders, Harakiri, Four Around a Woman, Destiny, Dr. Mabuse the Gambler, Die Nibelungen, Metropolis, Spione, and Woman in the Moon); The Mummy: Complete Legacy Collection (The Mummy, The Mummy's Hand, The Mummy's Tomb, The Mummy's Curse, The Mummy's Ghost, and Abbott and Costello Meet the Mummy); OSS 117: Five Film Collection (OSS 117 Is Unleashed, Shadow of Evil, OSS 117 Mission for a Killer, Atout cœur à Tokyo pour OSS 117, and OSS 117 – Double Agent)

=== Local Stage Production ===
Best Local Stage Production
- Something Rotten! (Segerstrom Center for the Arts)
  - Finding Neverland (Segerstrom Center for the Arts)
  - Miracle on 34th Street (Pasadena Playhouse)
  - Oklahoma! (3-D Theatricals)
  - Spamalot (3-D Theatricals)
  - Zoot Suit (Mark Taper Forum)

=== Special Achievement Awards ===
- Special Achievement Award – Don Mancini
- Producer's Showcase Award – Jason Blum
- Dan Curtis Legacy Award – Sarah Schechter
- Filmmaker's Showcase Award – Jake Kasdan
- President's Memorial Award – Guillermo del Toro

== Multiple wins and nominations ==
=== Multiple wins ===
==== Film ====
The following films won multiple awards:

- 5 wins: Black Panther
- 3 wins: Star Wars: The Last Jedi
- 2 wins: Coco

==== Television ====
The following television series won multiple awards:

- 3 wins: Better Call Saul, Twin Peaks: The Return
- 2 wins: Star Trek: Discovery, The Walking Dead

=== Multiple nominations ===
==== Film ====
The following films received multiple nominations:

- 14 nominations: Black Panther
- 13 nominations: Star Wars: The Last Jedi
- 9 nominations: Blade Runner 2049, The Shape of Water
- 6 nominations: Logan, Wonder Woman
- 5 nominations: Get Out
- 4 nominations: Beauty and the Beast, Guardians of the Galaxy Vol. 2, It, Spider-Man: Homecoming, War for the Planet of the Apes
- 3 nominations: The Greatest Showman, Valerian and the City of a Thousand Planets, Wonder, Wonderstruck
- 2 nominations: Brawl in Cell Block 99, Coco, Dunkirk, The Fate of the Furious, Hostiles, Kong: Skull Island, Thor: Ragnarok, Three Billboards Outside Ebbing, Missouri

==== Television ====
The following television series received multiple nominations:

- 7 nominations: The Walking Dead
- 5 nominations: Star Trek: Discovery, Twin Peaks: The Return
- 4 nominations: American Horror Story: Cult, Game of Thrones, Riverdale
- 3 nominations: American Gods, Better Call Saul, The Flash, The Librarians, The Orville, Outlander, Supergirl
- 2 nominations: The Alienist, Ash vs Evil Dead, Black Mirror, The Defenders, Doctor Who, Electric Dreams, Fargo, Fear the Walking Dead, Gotham, The Punisher, The Strain, Stranger Things, The X-Files
