= Arjen Tuiten =

Dutch make-up artist

- Born: September 23, 1980 (age 45); Joure, Friesland, Netherlands
- Occupation: Special make-up effects artist
- Years active: 1995–present

Arjen Tuiten is a Netherlands-born American Special effects make-up artist. Tuiten started his career under the supervision of Stan Winston, Rick Baker, and Dick Smith. He worked on films Terminator 3: Rise of the Machines (2003), Pan's Labyrinth (2006), Terminator Salvation (2009), Iron Man 2, The Twilight Saga: Breaking Dawn – Part 1 (2011), Maleficent (2014), Wonder (2017) and Welcome to Marwen (2018). For his work on Wonder, he received an Academy Award for Best Makeup and Hairstyling nomination at the 90th Academy Awards.
