= 28th Saturn Awards =

US film and television award ceremony

- Date: June 10, 2002
- Site: Century City, Los Angeles, California, U.S.

Highlights
- Most awards: A.I. Artificial Intelligence (5)
- Most nominations: Harry Potter and the Sorcerer's Stone (9)

The 28th Saturn Awards, honoring the best in science fiction, fantasy and horror film and television in 2001, were held on June 10, 2002 at the St. Regis Hotel in Century City, Los Angeles. This year introduced categories that honored DVD releases onward. The nominations were announced on March 13, 2002.

Below is a complete list of nominees and winners. Winners are highlighted in bold.

== Winners and nominees ==
=== Film ===
Best Actor	Best Actress
**Tom Cruise – Vanilla Sky as David Aames**; Johnny Depp – From Hell as Inspector Frederick Abberline; Anthony Hopkins – Hannibal as Dr. Hannibal Lecter; Guy Pearce – Memento Leonard Shelby; Kevin Spacey – K-PAX as Prot / Robert Porter; Billy Bob Thornton – The Man Who Wasn't There as Ed Crane	**Nicole Kidman – The Others as Grace Stewart**; Kate Beckinsale – Serendipity as Sara Thomas; Angelina Jolie – Lara Croft: Tomb Raider as Lara Croft; Julianne Moore – Hannibal as Clarice Starling; Frances O'Connor – A.I. Artificial Intelligence as Monica Swinton; Naomi Watts – Mulholland Drive as Betty Elms / Diane Selwyn
Best Supporting Actor	Best Supporting Actress
**Ian McKellen – The Lord of the Rings: The Fellowship of the Ring as Gandalf the Grey**; Robbie Coltrane – Harry Potter and the Sorcerer's Stone as Rubeus Hagrid; Mark Dacascos – Brotherhood of the Wolf as Mani; Eddie Murphy – Shrek as Donkey; Jeremy Piven – Serendipity as Dean Kansky; Tim Roth – Planet of the Apes as General Thade	**Fionnula Flanagan – The Others as Mrs. Mills**; Monica Bellucci – Brotherhood of the Wolf as Sylvia; Helena Bonham Carter – Planet of the Apes as Ari; Cameron Diaz – Vanilla Sky as Julianna "Julie" Gianni; Frances McDormand – The Man Who Wasn't There as Doris Crane; Maggie Smith – Harry Potter and the Sorcerer's Stone as Professor Minerva McGonagall
Best Director	Best Writing
**Peter Jackson – The Lord of the Rings: The Fellowship of the Ring**; Alejandro Amenábar – The Others; Chris Columbus – Harry Potter and the Sorcerer's Stone; Christophe Gans – Brotherhood of the Wolf; David Lynch – Mulholland Drive; Steven Spielberg – A.I. Artificial Intelligence	**Steven Spielberg – A.I. Artificial Intelligence**; Alejandro Amenábar – The Others; Stéphane Cabel and Christophe Gans – Brotherhood of the Wolf; Ted Elliott, Terry Rossio, Joe Stillman, and Roger S. H. Schulman – Shrek; Peter Jackson, Fran Walsh, and Philippa Boyens – The Lord of the Rings: The Fellowship of the Ring; Andrew Stanton and Dan Gerson – Monsters, Inc.
Best Costumes	Best Make-up
**Judianna Makovsky – Harry Potter and the Sorcerer's Stone**; Colleen Atwood – Planet of the Apes; Kym Barrett – From Hell; Dominique Borg – Brotherhood of the Wolf; Catherine Martin and Angus Strathie – Moulin Rouge!; Richard Taylor and Ngila Dickson – The Lord of the Rings: The Fellowship of the Ring	**Greg Cannom and Wesley Wofford – Hannibal**; Rick Baker and John Blake – Planet of the Apes; Michèle Burke and Camille Calvet – Vanilla Sky; Nick Dudman, Mark Coulier, and John Lambert – Harry Potter and the Sorcerer's Stone; Peter Owen and Richard Taylor – The Lord of the Rings: The Fellowship of the Ring; Aileen Seaton, Nick Dudman, and Jane Walker – The Mummy Returns
Best Music	Best Fantasy Film
**John Williams – A.I. Artificial Intelligence**; Angelo Badalamenti – Mulholland Drive; Harry Gregson-Williams and John Powell – Shrek; Joseph LoDuca – Brotherhood of the Wolf; Howard Shore – The Lord of the Rings: The Fellowship of the Ring; Nancy Wilson – Vanilla Sky	**The Lord of the Rings: The Fellowship of the Ring**; Harry Potter and the Sorcerer's Stone; Monsters, Inc.; The Mummy Returns; Shrek; Spy Kids
Best Horror Film	Best Science Fiction Film
**The Others**; The Devil's Backbone; From Hell; Hannibal; Jeepers Creepers; Thirteen Ghosts	**A.I. Artificial Intelligence**; Jurassic Park III; Lara Croft: Tomb Raider; The One; Planet of the Apes; Vanilla Sky
Best Action/Adventure/Thriller Film	Best Performance by a Younger Actor
**Memento**; Black Hawk Down; Brotherhood of the Wolf; Joy Ride; The Man Who Wasn't There; Mulholland Drive	**Haley Joel Osment – A.I. Artificial Intelligence as David**; Freddie Boath – The Mummy Returns as Alex O'Conell; Justin Long – Jeepers Creepers as Darius "Darry" Jenner; Alakina Mann – The Others as Anne Stewart; Daniel Radcliffe – Harry Potter and the Sorcerer's Stone as Harry Potter; Emma Watson – Harry Potter and the Sorcerer's Stone as Hermione Granger
Best Special Effects
**Dennis Muren, Scott Farrar, Stan Winston, and Michael Lantieri – A.I. Artificial Intelligence**; John Andrew Berton Jr., Daniel Jeannette, Neil Corbould, and Thomas Rosseter – The Mummy Returns; Robert Legato, Nick Davis, Roger Guyett, and John Richardson – Harry Potter and the Sorcerer's Stone; Jim Mitchell, Danny Gordon Taylor, Donald Elliot, and John Rosengrant – Jurassic Park III; Jim Rygiel, Randall William Cook, Richard Taylor, and Mark Stetson – The Lord of the Rings: The Fellowship of the Ring; Arthur Windus, Val Wardlaw, Hal Bertram, Nick Drew, and Seb Caudron – Brotherhood of the Wolf

=== Television ===
==== Programs ====
Best Network Television Series	Best Syndicated/Cable Television Series
**Buffy the Vampire Slayer (The WB)**; Angel (The WB); Dark Angel (Fox); Enterprise (UPN); Smallville (The WB); The X-Files (Fox)	**Farscape (Sci Fi)**; Andromeda (Syndicated); The Chronicle (Sci Fi); The Invisible Man (Sci Fi); Stargate SG-1 (Showtime); Witchblade (TNT)
Best Single Television Presentation
**Jack and the Beanstalk: The Real Story (CBS)**; Earth vs. the Spider (Cinemax); The Lost Empire (NBC); The Mists of Avalon (TNT); She Creature (Cinemax); Teenage Caveman (Cinemax)

==== Acting ====
Best Television Actor	Best Television Actress
**Ben Browder – Farscape (Sci Fi) as John Crichton**; Richard Dean Anderson – Stargate SG-1 (Showtime) as Jack O'Neill; Scott Bakula – Enterprise (UPN) as Jonathan Archer; David Boreanaz – Angel (The WB) as Angel; Robert Patrick – The X-Files (Fox) as John Doggett; Tom Welling – Smallville (The WB) as Clark Kent	**Yancy Butler – Witchblade (TNT) as Det. Sara "Pez" Pezzini**; Jessica Alba – Dark Angel (Fox) as Max Guevara; Gillian Anderson – The X-Files (Fox) as Dana Scully; Claudia Black – Farscape (Sci Fi) as Aeryn Sun; Sarah Michelle Gellar – Buffy the Vampire Slayer (The WB) as Buffy Summers; Kristin Kreuk – Smallville (The WB) as Lana Lang
Best Supporting Television Actor	Best Supporting Television Actress
**Michael Rosenbaum – Smallville (The WB) as Lex Luthor**; Christopher Judge – Stargate SG-1 (Showtime) as Teal'c; James Marsters – Buffy the Vampire Slayer (The WB) as Spike; Anthony Simcoe – Farscape (Sci Fi) as Ka D'Argo; Connor Trinneer – Enterprise (UPN) as Trip Tucker; Michael Weatherly – Dark Angel (Fox) as Logan Cale	**Jolene Blalock – Enterprise (UPN) as T'Pol**; Gigi Edgley – Farscape (Sci Fi) as Chiana; Annabeth Gish – The X-Files (Fox) as Monica Reyes; Alyson Hannigan – Buffy the Vampire Slayer (The WB) as Willow Rosenberg; Amanda Tapping – Stargate SG-1 (Showtime) as Samantha Carter; Michelle Trachtenberg – Buffy the Vampire Slayer (The WB) as Dawn Summers

=== DVD ===
Best DVD Release	Best DVD Classic Film Release
**Ginger Snaps**; Bruiser; Harry, He's Here to Help; Lady and the Tramp II: Scamp's Adventure; Panic; Rat	**Snow White and the Seven Dwarfs (Platinum Edition)**; Close Encounters of the Third Kind (The Collector's Edition); Star Trek: The Motion Picture (The Director's Edition); Star Wars: Episode I – The Phantom Menace; Superman: The Movie; Suspiria
Best DVD Special Edition Release
**Shrek**; Final Fantasy: The Spirits Within; How the Grinch Stole Christmas; Lara Croft: Tomb Raider; Moulin Rouge!; Planet of the Apes

== Special awards ==
=== Cinescape Genre Face of the Future Award ===
Female	Male
**Jolene Blalock – Enterprise**; Amy Acker – Angel; Thora Birch – Dungeons & Dragons and Ghost World; Lexa Doig – Andromeda and Jason X; Kristin Kreuk – Smallville	**James Marsters – Buffy the Vampire Slayer**; Orlando Bloom – The Lord of the Rings: The Fellowship of the Ring; Hayden Christensen – Star Wars: Episode II – Attack of the Clones; Luke Goss – Blade II; Michael Rosenbaum – Smallville

=== The Young Filmmaker's Showcase Award ===
- Richard Kelly – Donnie Darko

=== The George Pal Memorial Award ===
- Samuel Z. Arkoff (posthumous)

=== The Special Achievement Award ===
- Anchor Bay Entertainment

=== The Dr. Donald A. Reed Award ===
- Sherry Lansing

=== The Life Career Award ===
- Stan Lee
- Drew Struzan
