= Saturn Award for Best DVD or Blu-ray Special Edition Release =

Annual US film award

Saturn Award for Best DVD or Blu-ray Special Edition Release (formerly known as Saturn Award for Best DVD Special Edition Release) was an award given by the Academy of Science Fiction, Fantasy and Horror Films to every alternative edition of a film. The following is a list of the winners of this award:

Year	Film	Ref.
2001 (28th)	Shrek (2-Disc Special Edition)	
2001 (28th)	Final Fantasy: The Spirits Within (Special Edition)	
2001 (28th)	How the Grinch Stole Christmas (Collector's Edition)	
2001 (28th)	Lara Croft: Tomb Raider (Special Collector's Edition)	
2001 (28th)	Moulin Rouge!	
2001 (28th)	Planet of the Apes (2-Disc Special Edition)	
2002 (29th)	The Lord of the Rings: The Fellowship of the Ring (Special Extended DVD Edition)	
2002 (29th)	A.I. Artificial Intelligence (2-Disc Special Edition)	
2002 (29th)	Memento	
2002 (29th)	Minority Report	
2002 (29th)	Monsters, Inc. (2-Disc Collector's Edition)	
2002 (29th)	Star Wars: Episode II − Attack of the Clones	
2003 (30th)	The Lord of the Rings: The Two Towers (Special Extended DVD Edition)	
2003 (30th)	Black Hawk Down (3-Disc Deluxe Edition)	
2003 (30th)	Finding Nemo (2-Disc Collector's Edition)	
2003 (30th)	Harry Potter and the Chamber of Secrets	
2003 (30th)	Identity (Special Edition)	
2003 (30th)	Pirates of the Caribbean: The Curse of the Black Pearl (2-Disc Collector's Edition)	
2004 (31st)	The Lord of the Rings: The Return of the King (Special Extended DVD Edition)	
2004 (31st)	The Chronicles of Riddick (Unrated Director's Cut)	
2004 (31st)	Hellboy (Director's Cut)	
2004 (31st)	King Arthur (Extended Unrated Version)	
2004 (31st)	Shrek 2	
2004 (31st)	Spider-Man 2 (Special Edition)	
2005 (32nd)	Sin City: Recut, Extended, Unrated	
2005 (32nd)	Donnie Darko: The Director's Cut	
2005 (32nd)	Eternal Sunshine of the Spotless Mind	
2005 (32nd)	The Incredibles (2-Disc Collector's Edition)	
2005 (32nd)	Lemony Snicket's A Series of Unfortunate Events	
2005 (32nd)	Saw (Unrated Special Edition)	
2006 (33rd)	Superman II: The Richard Donner Cut	
2006 (33rd)	The Chronicles of Narnia: The Lion, the Witch and the Wardrobe (Extended Edition)	
2006 (33rd)	Final Destination 3 (2-Disc Thrill Ride Edition)	
2006 (33rd)	King Kong (Deluxe Extended Edition)	
2006 (33rd)	Oldboy (Collector's Edition)	
2006 (33rd)	Saw II (Unrated Special Edition)	
2007 (34th)	Blade Runner (5-Disc Ultimate Collector's Edition)	
2007 (34th)	Big (Extended Edition)	
2007 (34th)	Close Encounters of the Third Kind (30th Anniversary Ultimate Edition)	
2007 (34th)	Death Proof: Extended and Unrated	
2007 (34th)	Pan's Labyrinth (New Line 2-Disc Platinum Series)	
2007 (34th)	Troy: Director's Cut (Ultimate Collector's Edition)	
2008 (35th)	Stephen King's The Mist (2-Disc Special Edition)	
2008 (35th)	Brotherhood of the Wolf (Director's Cut)	
2008 (35th)	Dark City (Director's Cut)	
2008 (35th)	The Dark Knight (2-Disc Special Edition)	
2008 (35th)	L.A. Confidential (2-Disc Special Edition)	
2008 (35th)	Zodiac (Director's Cut)	
2009 (36th)	Watchmen: The Ultimate Cut	
2009 (36th)	300: The Complete Experience	
2009 (36th)	District 9 (2-Disc Edition)	
2009 (36th)	Snow White and the Seven Dwarfs (Diamond Edition)	
2009 (36th)	Terminator 2: Judgment Day (Skynet Edition)	
2009 (36th)	X-Men Origins: Wolverine (2-Disc Special Edition)	
2010 (37th)	Avatar (Extended Collector's Edition)	
2010 (37th)	Monsters (2-Disc Special Edition)	
2010 (37th)	Red Cliff (Original International Version)	
2010 (37th)	Robin Hood (Unrated Director's Cut)	
2010 (37th)	Salt (Deluxe Unrated Edition)	
2010 (37th)	The Wolfman (Unrated Director's Cut)	
2011 (38th)	Giorgio Moroder Presents Metropolis	
2011 (38th)	Citizen Kane (70th Anniversary Ultimate Collector's Edition)	
2011 (38th)	Mimic: The Director's Cut	
2011 (38th)	The Phantom of the Opera (Blu-ray Disc version)	
2011 (38th)	The Rocketeer (20th Anniversary Edition)	
2011 (38th)	Willy Wonka & the Chocolate Factory (40th Anniversary Ultimate Collector's Edition)	
2012 (39th)	Little Shop of Horrors: The Director's Cut	
2012 (39th)	Jaws (Universal 100th Anniversary Edition)	
2012 (39th)	Lawrence of Arabia (50th Anniversary Collector's Edition)	
2012 (39th)	Les Vampires (Classics Edition)	
2012 (39th)	Stanley Kubrick's Fear and Desire	
2014 (41st)	Nightbreed: The Director's Cut	
2014 (41st)	Alexander: The Ultimate Cut	
2014 (41st)	The Hobbit: The Desolation of Smaug (Extended Edition)	
2014 (41st)	Once Upon a Time in America (Extended Director's Cut)	
2014 (41st)	Sorcerer	
2014 (41st)	The Texas Chain Saw Massacre (40th Anniversary Collector's Edition)	
2015 (42nd)	X-Men: Days of Future Past: The Rogue Cut	
2015 (42nd)	Furious 7 (Extended Edition)	
2015 (42nd)	The Hobbit: The Battle of the Five Armies (Extended Edition)	
2015 (42nd)	Society (Limited Edition)	
2015 (42nd)	Vanilla Sky (with Alternate Ending)	
2016 (43rd)	Phantasm: Remastered	
2016 (43rd)	Batman v Superman: Dawn of Justice (Ultimate Edition)	
2016 (43rd)	The Hills Have Eyes (Limited Edition)	
2016 (43rd)	The Iron Giant (Signature Edition)	
2016 (43rd)	Mad Max: Fury Road (Black & Chrome Edition)	
2016 (43rd)	Raising Cain (Collector's Edition)	
2017 (44th)	Night of the Living Dead (The Criterion Collection)	
2017 (44th)	Lost Horizon (80th Anniversary)	
2017 (44th)	The Lost World (Deluxe Edition)	
2017 (44th)	Re-Animator (Special Edition)	
2017 (44th)	Speed Racer (Collector's Edition)	
2017 (44th)	Suspiria (40th Anniversary Edition)	
2018/2019 (45th)	Waterworld (Limited Edition)	
2018/2019 (45th)	12 Monkeys (Special Edition)	
2018/2019 (45th)	The Changeling (Limited Edition)	
2018/2019 (45th)	Crimson Peak (Limited Edition)	
2018/2019 (45th)	A Fistful of Dollars (Special Edition)	
2018/2019 (45th)	Horror Express (Special Edition)	
