= Prosthetic makeup =

Techniques to create special cosmetic effects

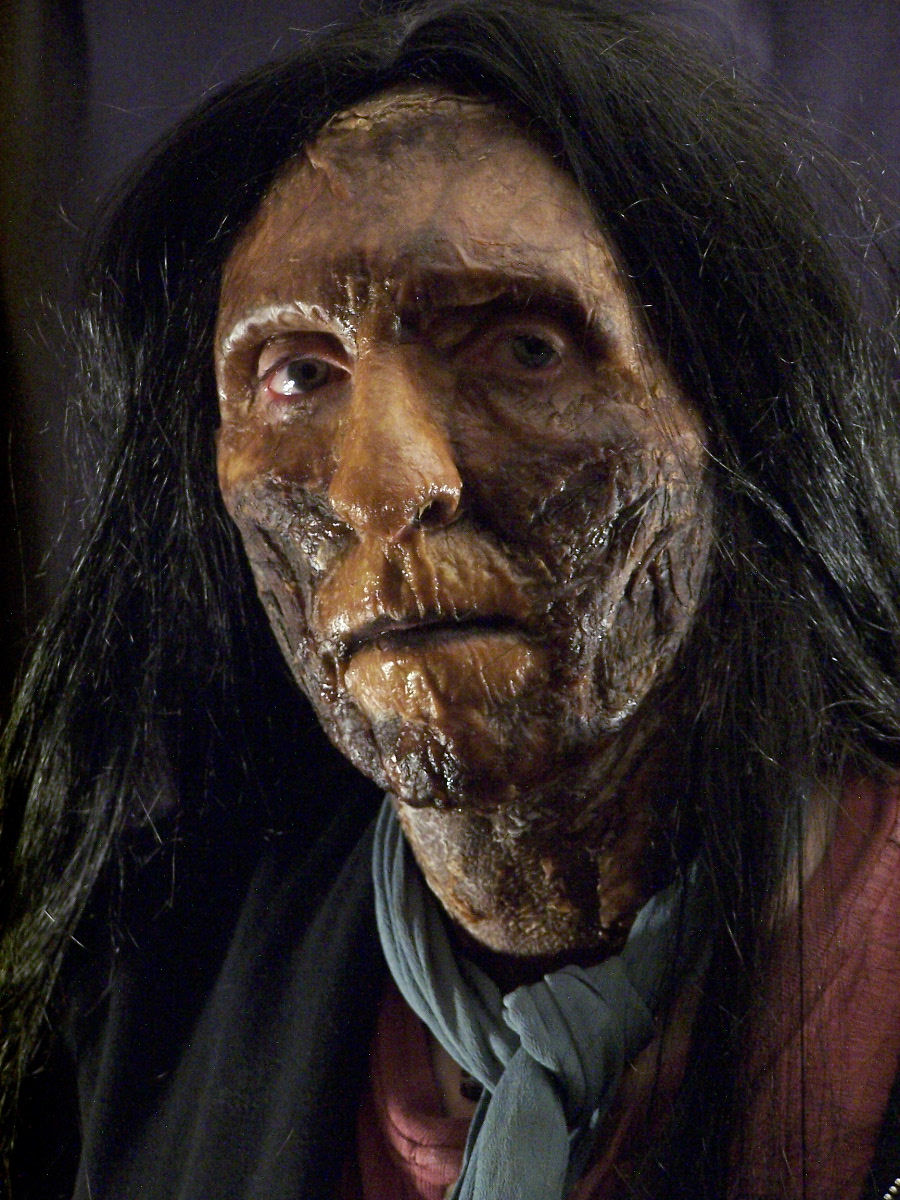
A portrayal of Frankenstein's monster using prosthetic makeup

Prosthetic makeup, also known as special makeup effects or FX prosthesis, is the process of using prosthetic sculpting, molding and casting techniques to create advanced cosmetic effects. Prosthetics are used on stage and screen to create fantasy creatures, simulated injuries, or likenesses of other people.

Prosthetic makeup draws a straight lineage from the stagecraft of theater and can be observed at the birth of science fiction cinema with Le Voyage dans La Lune, a 1902 French adventure short film directed by pioneer of special effects Georges Méliès.

The work of makeup artist Jack Pierce furthered pioneered early Hollywood prosthetic work and is best remembered for creating the iconic makeup worn by Boris Karloff in Frankenstein, his makeup for Lon Chaney Jr. in The Wolfman.

Modern prosthetic makeup was revolutionized by Christopher Tucker whose work on The Elephant Man was considered so ground breaking that when it failed to win any recognition at the 53rd Academy Awards, letters of protests argued for it to receive an honorary award – this was ignored but did lead to the creation of the Academy Award for Best Makeup the following year.

== History ==
Before sculpted prosthetic appliances became standard, special effects makeup artists would have to build up forms on the actor's face before shooting began, which often took several hours and would have to be done from scratch at the start of each day. The Frankenstein makeup by Jack Pierce consisted of spirit gum, cotton, collodion, and wax, taking around 3 hours to apply in the morning, and another 1-2 hours to remove at the end of the day.

Rubber began to be used to make appliances in the late 30s, with Pierce making rubber head forms and broken neck appliances for Boris Karloff and Bela Lugosi respectively. A rubber snout was made for Lon Chaney Jr. to wear in The Wolfman, though application of the hair for the titular character could take up to 16 hours.

Foam latex was first used by makeup artist Jack Dawn for The Wizard of Oz in 1939 to create the makeup for the Cowardly Lion and Scarecrow. It wasn't until John Chambers's work on Planet of the Apes in 1968 that prosthetics transitioned from full face appliances to smaller, overlapping pieces which afforded the actors more expression and movement.

In 1965, William Tuttle won an Academy Honorary Award for his makeup work on 7 Faces of Dr. Lao at the 37th Academy Awards, making him the first artist to win an award for makeup before the Best Makeup category was introduced in 1981.

== Technique ==
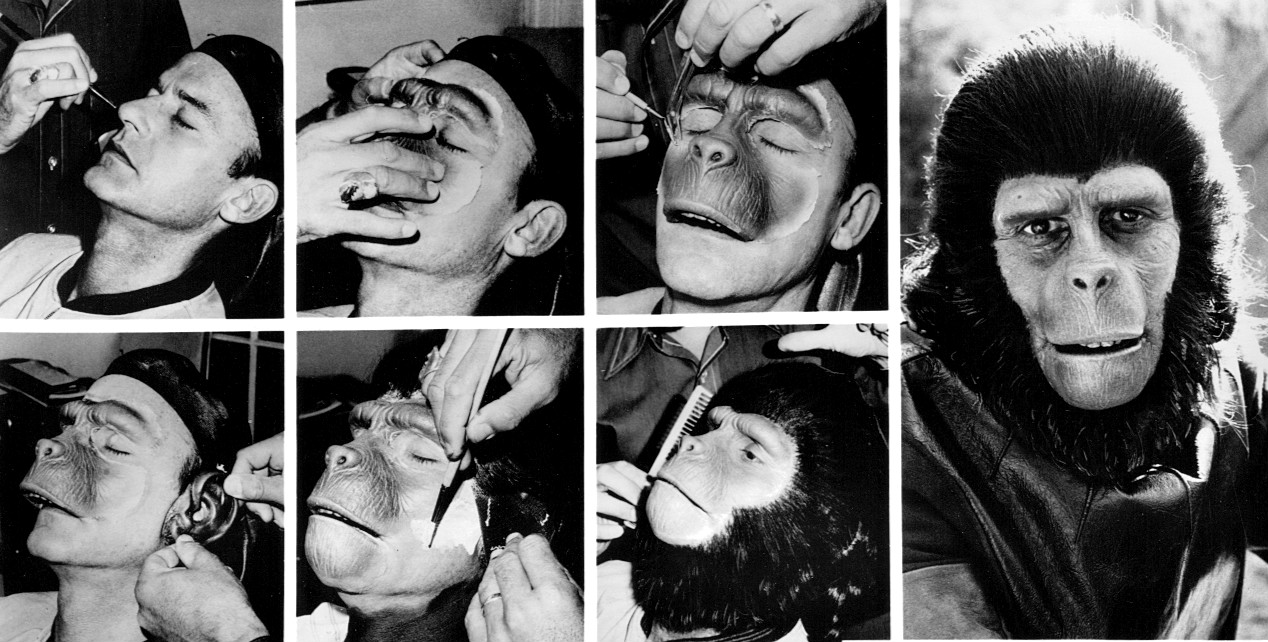
Prosthetics being applied to actor Roddy McDowall for the 1968 film Planet of the Apes

The process of creating a makeup prosthetic appliance typically begins with concept art, created by the artist or production. Once the actor has been chosen, the effects artist will prepare the actor for the process of taking a mold of the actor's face, head or body part. This process is called lifecasting. Lifecast molds are made from prosthetic alginate or more recently, from skin-safe platinum silicone rubber. This initial mold can be relatively weak but flexible. A hard mother mold, also known as a jacket or matrix, is typically made of plaster bandage which is created over the outside of the initial flexible mold to provide support. This mold is used to cast a copy of that part of the actor, in a hard resin or plaster type material to eventually use as a base for sculpting the prosthetic. This is considered a "positive" or life-cast.

Before sculpting the clay prosthetic over the positive, The positive must be prepared by adding "keys" or mold points along the edges of it, which are often added using clay or more plaster or carved into the life-cast, to make sure that the two pieces of the mold will fit together correctly. Often the life-cast will be given an additional border in clay or plaster in order to have an area free of detail and undercuts to add these keys. The entire life-cast with borders and keys included is then molded. This ensures a stable area with built in keys to sculpt the prosthetic over. This also provides the artist an easily duplicated copy, if needed. Multiple copies are typically used to make variations or stages of prosthetics or different prosthetics for the same actor.

Life-casts of full bodies and body parts are also used and reused as the basis for making fake body parts, severed limbs, and various "gore" type effects used in horror films or films where body parts are required.

The prosthetic required will be sculpted over the life-cast of that body part to become the design intended. For example, if the desired look is a pig nosed person, then the artist would sculpt the pig nose over the actor's real nose on the life-cast or positive copy. The edges of the clay should be made as thin as possible, for the clay is a stand-in for what will eventually be the prosthetic piece. Once sculpted, the new addition of the clay sculpted prosthetic part must be molded. Since the positive has been prepared with the additional border and keys, it actually becomes part of the prosthetic mold itself. Once molded, and clay removed, new mold cleaned out, the positive is one part of the mold and the new mold is the other side which has the negative of the newly sculpted prosthetic. This gives two or more pieces of a mold - a positive of the face or body part, and one (or more for complex molds) "negative" mold pieces with prosthetic sculpted in.

To make the new prosthetic, material is cast into the mold cavity (where the clay used to be). The prosthetic material can be foam latex, gelatin, silicone or other similar materials. The prosthetic is cured within the two-part mold, and then carefully removed and prepared for painting and or application to the actor.

== Conflict with CGI ==
As the film/television industry continues to grow, so do the capabilities of the technologies behind it. Since the debut of newer technologies, many have feared that CGI (Computer-Generated Imagery) will put practical SFX makeup out of business. CGI can be used to accomplish effects that simply aren't possible when working in practical effects.

Tom Woodruff Jr. and Alec Gillis, two experienced SFX artists from Amalgamated Dynamics near L.A., share what they see as the middle ground on the subject. In an interview, they explain that most movies use (out of necessity) a combination of practical effects and CGI. They see CGI as a tool that can be utilized in a positive or negative way, just like practical effects. Tom Savini (an SFX artist known for his work in Dawn of the Dead and Creepshow) states: "They still use the make-up guys to design the creatures and that’s what they work from. I don’t think you’ll see make-up effects guys hanging out on corners with signs that say: WILL DO EFFECTS FOR FOOD."

In the 2000s, CGI and practical effects began being used in tandem, with CGI often used to enhance prosthetic makeup in a way that would have been impossible to do practically such as erasing body parts or creating hollow points in the face. For Hugo Weaving's role as Red Skull in Captain America: The First Avenger, Weaving wore a full head silicone prosthetic makeup, which was covered in CGI tracking markers for his nose to be erased by VFX.

== Real-world use ==
Moulage is a process in which makeup is used to simulate different wounds and trauma in order to prepare medical, emergency, and military personnel for what they could experience in the field and lessen psychological trauma.

Craniofacial prosthetics are used in medical fields for cosmetic purposes to disguise deformations of the face, either those caused by trauma or birth defects as an alternative to reconstructive surgery. They can be used for smaller applications such as ears or noses, or full face masks. These prosthetics can provide both medical benefits such as improved speech and hearing as well as psychological benefits to the wearer.

== Notable artists ==
- Lon Chaney (The Hunchback of Notre Dame, The Phantom of the Opera, London After Midnight)
- Jack Pierce (Frankenstein (1931), The Mummy (1932), The Wolf Man (1941)
- John Chambers (Planet of the Apes original film series)
- Christopher Tucker (The Elephant Man)
- Dick Smith (Little Big Man, The Godfather, The Exorcist)
- Rick Baker (An American Werewolf in London, The Nutty Professor, Men in Black, How the Grinch Stole Christmas, The Wolfman (2010)
- Tom Savini (Friday the 13th, Dawn of the Dead, Creepshow)
- Rob Bottin (The Howling, The Thing, Total Recall)
- Stan Winston (The Terminator, Predator, Jurassic Park)
- Ve Neill (Beetlejuice, Mrs. Doubtfire, Ed Wood, Edward Scissorhands, Pirates of the Caribbean, The Hunger Games)
- Michael Westmore (Star Trek: The Next Generation, Star Trek: Deep Space Nine, Star Trek: Voyager, Star Trek: Enterprise, Raging Bull, Rocky, The Munsters)
- Gregory Nicotero (The Walking Dead)
- Howard Berger (The Chronicles of Narnia film series)
- Matthew W. Mungle (Albert Nobbs, The Butler, CSI: Crime Scene Investigation, Edward Scissorhands, Bram Stoker’s Dracula)

== See also ==
- Make-up artist
- Special effect
- Animatronics
- Facial prosthetic
- Craniofacial prosthesis
- Rubber mask
- Academy Award for Best Makeup and Hairstyling

== Bibliography ==
- "Prosthetic Makeup". How It's Made. Discovery Channel.
- "Disguise". The Most Extreme. Animal Planet.
- "Truffle Forager and Food Make-Up Artist". Will Work for Food. Food Network.
