= Long Dong Silver =

British retired porn star (born 1960)

- Born: Daniel Arthur Mead; 20 April 1960 (age 66); London, United Kingdom

Daniel Arthur Mead (born 20 April 1960), known professionally as Long Dong Silver, is a British retired porn star known for his large penis. His stage name is a reference to the fictional Treasure Island character Long John Silver.

== Career ==
Famed for the apparent size of his penis, reputedly 18 inches (46 cm), he appeared in several pornographic movies in the UK and US during the late 1970s and early 1980s. Photographer Jay Myrdal said that although Silver "was immensely endowed ... a good nine or ten inches", the penis featured in his porn shoots was faked. After at first using "complicated multi-exposure techniques" to enhance it in still photography, Myrdal later persuaded Christopher Tucker, the makeup artist for the 1980 film The Elephant Man, to create a prosthetic. Myrdal described it as "very light, a very delicate foam latex sleeve that fit on over the cock, carefully glued down underneath by the pubes and then made up".

Silver's debut film was the low-budget Sex Freaks, released in 1979, in which he co-starred with Vicki Scott. In 1982, he appeared with the actress Seka in Beauty and the Beast, shot in the US. Silver reached a new audience in the wake of allegations of sexual harassment during the Clarence Thomas Supreme Court nomination in the US Senate in 1991, as Anita Hill alleged that Thomas had mentioned to her that he was a viewer of Silver's films.

== See also ==
- Milton Berle
- John Dillinger
- Jonah Falcon
- List of British pornographic actors
