= Saturn Award for Best Classic Film DVD Release =

Annual US media award

The Saturn Award for Best Classic Film Release is an award given by the Academy of Science Fiction, Fantasy and Horror Films to a film considered to be "classic", at least through the present time that each film is nominated for this award. The following is a list of winners of this award:

== Winners and nominees ==
Year	Film	Ref.
2001 (28th)	Snow White and the Seven Dwarfs (Platinum Edition)	
2001 (28th)	Close Encounters of the Third Kind (The Collector's Edition)	
2001 (28th)	Star Trek: The Motion Picture (The Director's Edition)	
2001 (28th)	Star Wars: Episode I − The Phantom Menace	
2001 (28th)	Superman: The Movie	
2001 (28th)	Suspiria (Limited Edition)	
2002 (29th)	E.T. the Extra-Terrestrial (Ultimate Gift Set)	
2002 (29th)	Back to the Future: The Complete Trilogy	
2002 (29th)	Beauty and the Beast (Platinum Edition)	
2002 (29th)	The Great Race	
2002 (29th)	Near Dark	
2002 (29th)	Star Trek II: The Wrath of Khan (The Director's Edition)	
2003 (30th)	The Adventures of Robin Hood (2-Disc Special Edition)	
2003 (30th)	20,000 Leagues Under the Sea (Special Edition)	
2003 (30th)	Dead of Night	
2003 (30th)	The Lion King (Platinum Edition)	
2003 (30th)	Once Upon a Time in the West (Special Collector's Edition)	
2003 (30th)	Roadgames	
2004 (31st)	Dawn of the Dead (Ultimate Edition)	
2004 (31st)	Aladdin (Platinum Edition)	
2004 (31st)	Duel (Collector's Edition)	
2004 (31st)	The Fearless Vampire Killers	
2004 (31st)	Freaks	
2004 (31st)	THX 1138: The George Lucas Director's Cut	
2005 (32nd)	The Wizard of Oz (3-Disc Collector's Edition)	
2005 (32nd)	Ben-Hur (4-Disc Collector's Edition)	
2005 (32nd)	The Fly (Collector's Edition)	
2005 (32nd)	Gladiator (Extended Edition)	
2005 (32nd)	King Kong (2-Disc Special Edition)	
2005 (32nd)	Titanic (3-Disc Special Collector's Edition)	
2006 (33rd)	Godzilla (Gojira)	
2006 (33rd)	Forbidden Planet (50th Anniversary 2-Disc Special Edition)	
2006 (33rd)	Free Enterprise (Five Year Mission Extended Edition 2-Disc Set)	
2006 (33rd)	A Nightmare on Elm Street	
2006 (33rd)	The Searchers (50th Anniversary 2-Disc Special Edition)	
2006 (33rd)	She	
2006 (33rd)	This Island Earth	
2007 (34th)	The Monster Squad (2-Disc 20th Anniversary Edition)	
2007 (34th)	Alligator	
2007 (34th)	The Dark Crystal (25th Anniversary Edition)	
2007 (34th)	Face/Off (2-Disc Special Collector's Edition)	
2007 (34th)	Flash Gordon (Saviour of the Universe Edition)	
2007 (34th)	Witchfinder General	
2008 (35th)	Psycho (Universal Legacy Series)	
2008 (35th)	Casablanca (Ultimate Collector's Edition)	
2008 (35th)	Heathers (20th High School Reunion Edition)	
2008 (35th)	The Nightmare Before Christmas (Collector's Edition)	
2008 (35th)	The Picture of Dorian Gray	
2008 (35th)	Sleeping Beauty (Platinum Edition)	
2010 (37th)	The Complete Metropolis	
2010 (37th)	Cronos (The Criterion Collection)	
2010 (37th)	The Exorcist (Extended Director's Cut)	
2010 (37th)	King Kong	
2010 (37th)	Pandora and the Flying Dutchman (Deluxe Edition)	
2010 (37th)	Psycho (50th Anniversary Edition)	
2013 (40th)	Halloween (35th Anniversary Edition)	
2013 (40th)	Fantastic Voyage	
2013 (40th)	The Haunting	
2013 (40th)	House of Wax	
2013 (40th)	Nosferatu (2-Disc Deluxe Remastered Edition)	
2013 (40th)	The Wicker Man: The Final Cut	
2015 (42nd)	Miracle Mile	
2015 (42nd)	Burnt Offerings	
2015 (42nd)	Cemetery Without Crosses	
2015 (42nd)	Ladyhawke	
2015 (42nd)	The Monster That Challenged the World	
2015 (42nd)	Tales of Terror	
2015 (42nd)	X: The Man with the X-Ray Eyes	
2016 (43rd)	Time After Time	
2016 (43rd)	Destiny	
2016 (43rd)	Donovan's Brain	
2016 (43rd)	Gog 3D	
2016 (43rd)	It Came from Outer Space	
2016 (43rd)	The Little Girl Who Lives Down the Lane	
2017 (44th)	Lifeboat	
2017 (44th)	Caltiki − The Immortal Monster	
2017 (44th)	Deluge	
2017 (44th)	The Maphisto Waltz	
2017 (44th)	The Old Dark House	
2017 (44th)	Tobor the Great	
2018/2019 (45th)	2001: A Space Odyssey (4K UHD)	
2018/2019 (45th)	Deep Rising (20th Anniversary Edition)	
2018/2019 (45th)	Jack the Giant Killer	
2018/2019 (45th)	Maximum Overdrive	
2018/2019 (45th)	The Reincarnation of Peter Proud (Special Edition)	
2018/2019 (45th)	The Spiral Staircase	
2019/2020 (46th)	Dr. Cyclops (Special Edition)	
2019/2020 (46th)	4D Man (Special Edition)	
2019/2020 (46th)	The Day the Earth Caught Fire (Special Edition)	
2019/2020 (46th)	Hercules in the Haunted World (Special 2-Disc Edition)	
2019/2020 (46th)	The Magic Sword (Special Edition)	
2019/2020 (46th)	RoboCop (Director's Cut)	
2019/2020 (46th)	The War of the Worlds (The Criterion Collection)	
2021/2022 (50th)	Theatre of Blood (Special Edition)	
2021/2022 (50th)	The Incredible Shrinking Man (The Criterion Collection)	
2021/2022 (50th)	Master of the World (Special Edition)	
2021/2022 (50th)	The Secret of the Blue Room	
2021/2022 (50th)	Village of the Giants	
2021/2022 (50th)	The Wonderful World of the Brothers Grimm (Deluxe 2-Disc Special Edition)	
2022/2023 (51st)	Invaders from Mars (4K UHD)	
2022/2023 (51st)	Attack of the 50 Foot Woman	
2022/2023 (51st)	It Came from Outer Space (4K UHD)	
2022/2023 (51st)	It! The Terror from Beyond Space (Special Edition)	
2022/2023 (51st)	The Manchurian Candidate (4K UHD)	
2022/2023 (51st)	The Night of the Hunter (4K UHD)	
2022/2023 (51st)	Secret of the Incas (Special Edition)	
2023/2024 (52nd)	Invasion of the Body Snatchers (4K UHD)	
2023/2024 (52nd)	I Walked with a Zombie / The Seventh Victim (The Criterion Collection)	
2023/2024 (52nd)	The Ladykillers (4K UHD)	
2023/2024 (52nd)	A Nightmare on Elm Street (4K UHD)	
2023/2024 (52nd)	Repo Man (The Criterion Collection)	
2023/2024 (52nd)	Reptilicus (4K UHD)	
2024/2025 (53rd)	Frailty (4K UHD)	
2024/2025 (53rd)	Dead of Night	
2024/2025 (53rd)	Kingdom of Heaven: Director's Cut	
2024/2025 (53rd)	Night of the Juggler (4K UHD)	
2024/2025 (53rd)	Night of the Living Dead (4K UHD)	
2024/2025 (53rd)	Re-Animator (40th Anniversary)	
2024/2025 (53rd)	Tombstone (4K UHD)	
