= The Wolfman (film) =

2010 film by Joe Johnston

- Theatrical release poster
- Directed by: Joe Johnston
- Screenplay by: Andrew Kevin Walker; David Self
- Based on: The Wolf Man by Curt Siodmak
- Produced by: Scott Stuber; Benicio del Toro; Rick Yorn; Sean Daniel; Ankel Bitri
- Starring: Benicio del Toro; Anthony Hopkins; Emily Blunt; Hugo Weaving
- Cinematography: Shelly Johnson
- Edited by: Dennis Virkler; Walter Murch
- Music by: Danny Elfman
- Production companies: Universal Pictures; Relativity Media; Stuber Pictures
- Distributed by: Universal Pictures
- Release dates: January 27, 2010 (Arclight Hollywood); February 12, 2010 (United States)
- Running time: 103 minutes
- Country: United States
- Language: English
- Budget: $150 million
- Box office: $142.6 million

The Wolfman is a 2010 American Gothic horror film directed by Joe Johnston, from a screenplay by Andrew Kevin Walker and David Self. A remake of the 1941 film The Wolf Man, it stars Benicio del Toro (who also produced), Anthony Hopkins, Emily Blunt and Hugo Weaving. The film's story follows an actor who, after his brother's brutal murder, returns to his ancestral homeland in England, where he gets bitten by a werewolf and is cursed to become one.

Mark Romanek was originally attached to direct the film but left weeks before filming due to creative differences and budgetary issues. Johnston was hired four weeks before principal photography, under the impression he could shoot the film in 80 days as Universal intended. However, reshoots extended production, inflated the budget, and delayed the film's release several times. The film underwent numerous alternative versions during post-production. Danny Elfman was briefly replaced by Paul Haslinger as the film's composer; however, the studio changed back to Elfman's previously completed score a month before the film's release after finding Haslinger's electronic-based score unsuitable.

The Wolfman was theatrically released on February 12, 2010, by Universal Pictures, and received mixed reviews, although the makeup and del Toro's performance received praise. The film was a financial failure, grossing $142.6 million against a production budget of $150 million. For their work on the film, Rick Baker and makeup effects supervisor Dave Elsey won the Academy Award for Best Makeup and Hairstyling at the 83rd Academy Awards.

== Plot ==
In 1891, a man named Ben Talbot is killed by a humanoid wolf in the woods of Blackmoor. His mutilated body is found in a slaughterhouse. After learning of what happened, his brother Lawrence returns home, and reunites with his estranged father Sir John.

Some locals believe the killer to be a wild animal; many others blame the Romani camped outside Blackmoor. Another local claims that there was a similar murder twenty-five years earlier; a werewolf was the suspected killer. Lawrence tours his family's house. He recalls his childhood memory of seeing his mother Solana seemingly die by suicide, with Sir John standing over her corpse. He consequently suffered from delusions connected to the event and was sent to Lambeth Hospital in London for a year.

Lawrence visits the Romani during a full moon. The townspeople, led by Constable Nye, raid the camp to confiscate a dancing bear which they believe is the killer. The werewolf attacks the camp, kills Nye and some of the Romani and townspeople, bites Lawrence and escapes. Maleva, a Romani woman, sutures Lawrence's wounds. Another Romani insists that the now-cursed Lawrence should be killed before he kills others. Maleva says that only a loved one can release him.

After a night of feverish dreams, Lawrence recovers with unnatural speed and develops great vitality and heightened senses. Inspector Francis Aberline arrives to investigate, suspecting that Lawrence is responsible based on his mental history. Terrified of harming Gwen Conliffe, Ben's fiancée who is staying with the Talbots, Lawrence sends her to London. He later follows Sir John to Solana's crypt. There, Sir John locks himself in a room and gives Lawrence a cryptic warning. Lawrence turns into a werewolf before running off into the woods and killing hunters.

The next morning, Aberline and the police arrest Lawrence. Taken back to Lambeth, Lawrence is subjected to hellish treatments, both mental and physical, overseen by Dr. Hoenneger. Sir John visits Lawrence, explaining that twenty-five years before, during a hunting expedition in the Hindu Kush in India, he was bitten by a boy infected with lycanthropy. Sir John was the werewolf who bit Lawrence and is responsible for the recent murders, including Solana and Ben. He made Singh lock him up every full moon night and contemplated suicide for years. Now insane, Sir John has come to embrace his curse and has decided to let himself loose during his transformations. Knowing that the moon will be full, he leaves a razor in case Lawrence contemplates suicide.

By nightfall, Hoenneger conducts a lecture with Lawrence as a case study. Lawrence attempts to warn the attendees of the impending danger, but to no avail. Transforming once more, Lawrence kills Hoenegger and some orderlies before escaping and going on a rampage. The next day, Lawrence visits Gwen's antique shop for help. They admit their love for each other and kiss. Aberline waits outside Talbot Hall, arming himself and accompanying policemen with silver bullets. Gwen searches for Maleva hoping to cure Lawrence. However, Maleva says that there is no cure and that she must kill Lawrence herself.

Lawrence arrives at Talbot Hall, where Sir John has killed Singh and one of Aberline's men. He loads a gun with Singh's silver bullets and attempts to shoot Sir John. However, he realizes too late that Sir John had sabotaged the cartridges. As the two struggle, the full moon arises and the Talbots transform into werewolves. During their fight, they set Talbot Hall on fire. Lawrence eventually decapitates Sir John. Gwen and Aberline then arrive, and Lawrence attacks Aberline, biting him. Gwen picks up Aberline's pistol and flees into the nearby woods.

Still in his werewolf form, Lawrence pursues Gwen and corners her above a gorge. She pleads with Lawrence, and he spares her life. The hunting party approaches, distracting Lawrence long enough for Gwen to grant him mercy and end his life with shot in his heart from Aberline's gun. Lawrence reverts to human form, thanking Gwen for setting him free, and dies on her lap. Meanwhile, a wounded and horrified Aberline watches the full moon come into view. As Talbot Hall burns in the distance, the werewolf's howl is heard one last time, implying that Aberline has turned into a werewolf.

== Cast ==
- Benicio del Toro as Lawrence Talbot / The Wolfman
  - Mario Marin-Borquez as Young Lawrence Talbot
- Anthony Hopkins as Sir John Talbot / Wolfman
- Emily Blunt as Gwen Conliffe
- Hugo Weaving as Inspector Francis Aberline (loosely based on Frederick Abberline)
- Geraldine Chaplin as Maleva
- Art Malik as Singh
- Antony Sher as Dr. Hoenneger
- David Schofield as Constable Nye
- David Sterne as Kirk
- Simon Merrells as Ben Talbot
  - Asa Butterfield as Young Ben Talbot
- Cristina Contes as Solana Talbot
- Michael Cronin as Dr. Lloyd
- Nicholas Day as Colonel Montford
- Clive Russell as MacQueen
- Roger Frost as Reverend Fisk

Max von Sydow appears as an elderly man who gives Lawrence the wolf-head cane; his part was cut from the theatrical film but is restored in the unrated director's cut. Makeup effects creator Rick Baker makes a cameo appearance as the Romani man who is the first killed. The Wolfman's howl incorporated elements from rock singers Gene Simmons and David Lee Roth, as well as opera singers and animal impersonators.

== Production ==
=== Development ===
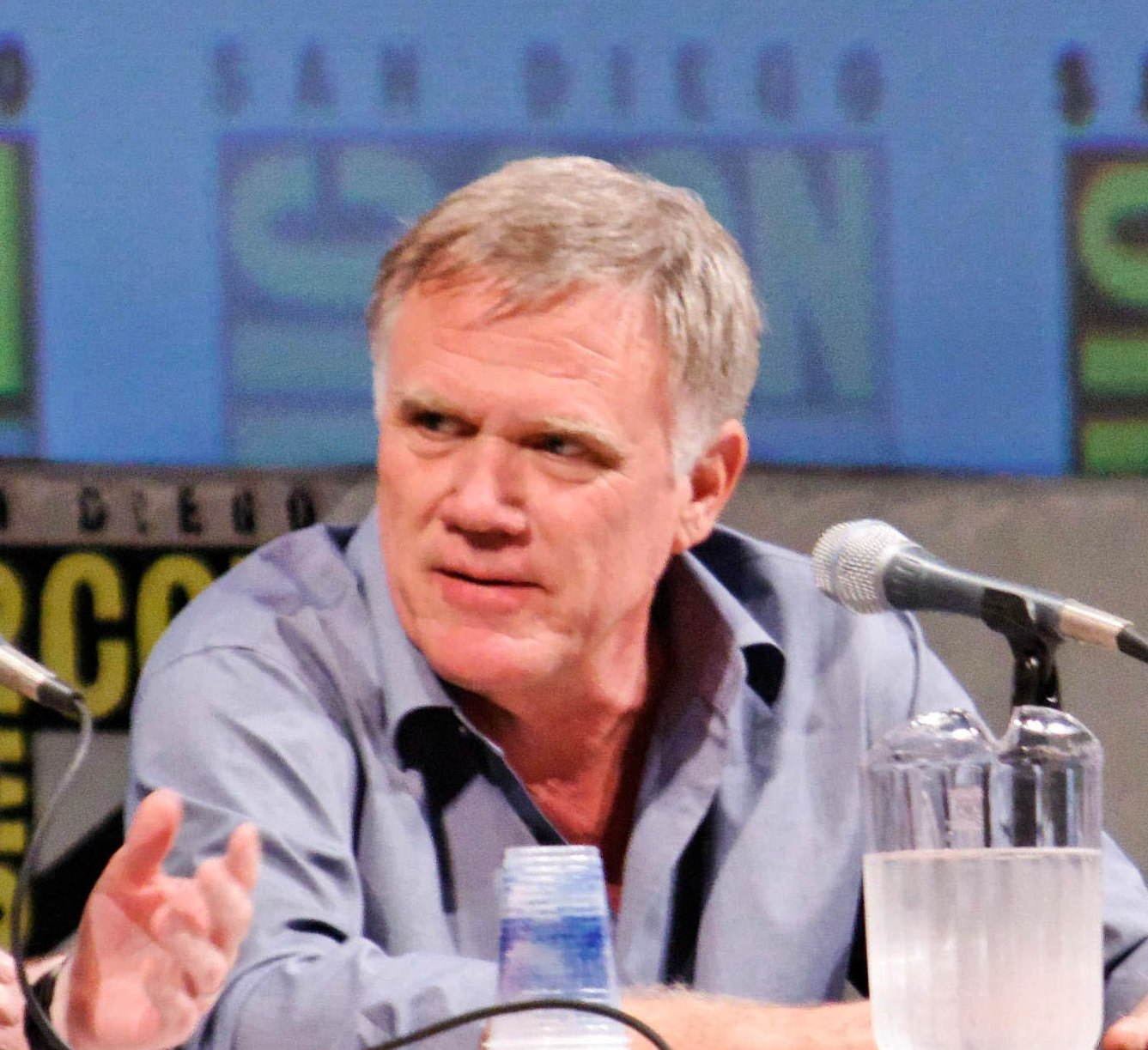
Joe Johnston was hired as director in February 2008, replacing Mark Romanek, who exited the film due to creative differences.

In March 2006, Universal Pictures announced the remake of The Wolf Man with actor Benicio del Toro, a huge fan of the original and collector of Wolf Man memorabilia, in the lead role. Screenwriter Andrew Kevin Walker was attached to the screenplay, developing the original film's story to include additional characters as well as plot points that would take advantage of modern visual effects. Del Toro also looked towards Werewolf of London and The Curse of the Werewolf for inspiration.

In February 2007, director Mark Romanek was attached to helm The Wolfman. Romanek's original vision was to "infuse a balance of cinema in a popcorn movie scenario", stating, "When there’s a certain amount of money involved, these things make studios and producers a little nervous. They don’t necessarily understand it or they feel that the balance will swing too far to something esoteric, and we could never come to an agreement on the right balance for that type of thing. Ultimately it made more sense for them to find a director that was gonna fulfill their idea of the film that they wanted, and we just sort of parted ways."

In January 2008, Romanek left the project because of creative differences. Brett Ratner emerged as a frontrunner to replace Romanek, but the studio also met with Frank Darabont, James Mangold and Joe Johnston. They were also interested in Bill Condon, and Martin Campbell was interested. Johnston was hired to direct on 3 February 2008, and the film's shooting schedule and budget remained as intended. Johnston hired David Self to rewrite the script.

=== Filming ===
Shooting took place from 3 March to 23 June 2008, in Britain. At that time, the film was budgeted at US$85 million. They shot at Pinewood Studios in Buckinghamshire, Chatsworth in Derbyshire and Castle Combe in Wiltshire. They transformed Chatsworth House by adding weeds, dead grass and ivy. They also shot in Lacock in Wiltshire, a village conserved by the National Trust for Places of Historic Interest or Natural Beauty, for a day (the butcher's barn and external shots). Universal donated £5,000 to the village, in return for filming in the tithe barn for a scene involving frozen corpses. A funeral scene was also shot beside the Temple of Ancient Virtue at Stowe House, with the temple coated in false ivy and copious amounts of smoke/mist floating over the setting. There were also scenes filmed on Dartmoor, Devon at Foggintor Quarry. Pick-ups at Pinewood were conducted in May 2009.

The cast and crew were back on location, reshooting the film in the grounds of the Old Royal Naval College and park in Greenwich over the weekends of 22–25 and 30–31 May 2009. The purpose of the reshoots was to change the way one werewolf looked in the film. Previously, it stood on two legs, but now, it stands on four. Also, an action scene was added between "the Wolf Man and the Werewolf" according to second unit director Vic Armstrong.

=== Visual effects ===
Rick Baker chose to keep his version faithful to the original Jack Pierce design, getting as close as possible.

Rick Baker created the makeup for The Wolfman. When he heard Universal was remaking the film, he eagerly pursued it, as both The Wolf Man and Frankenstein inspired him to become a makeup artist as a child. He acknowledged transforming del Toro was not difficult because he is a hairy man: "Going from Benicio to Benicio as the Wolf Man isn't a really extreme difference. Like when I did An American Werewolf in London, we went from this naked man to a four-legged hound from Hell, and we had a lot of room to go from the transformation and do a lot of really extreme things. Here we have Benicio del Toro, who's practically the Wolf Man already, to Benicio del Toro with more hair and bigger teeth."

Baker and del Toro were adamant about the design resembling the makeup created by Jack Pierce for the 1941 film, but Romanek went through thousands of concept art renderings. When Johnston signed on, Baker returned to his second design, which is the finished result. The makeup took three hours to apply, and one hour to remove. New pieces of latex prosthetic makeup and loose hair was applied to del Toro's face each day, while several dentures and wigs were created in case some were damaged. Baker said the transformation would likely be computer-generated, which disappointed him as he would not be involved and felt it would look unrealistic (as the animators did not have his knowledge of the design). Director Joe Johnston explained that joining the film three weeks before photography placed limitations on his ability to film without using CGI effects. He has stated, “I recognised that there were things that I was going to be able to do from the beginning to the end, and things that I had to rely on post-production for." In reference to filming Benicio del Toro's actual transformation into the Wolfman, Johnston further explained, "I decided to basically shoot just Benicio, in the sequence where he transforms and decide in post-production what I wanted the transformation to be. That was really my main reason for using CGI; it gave me so much more flexibility." In February 2009, ZBrush art of the transformation by Baker leaked online. In addition to the film, at the 2009 Halloween Horror Nights, Universal Studios Florida added The Wolfman to the event.

== Music ==
Danny Elfman was initially reported to have written a dark, melodic, and moody score for The Wolfman, which was rejected by the studio as it did not fit the film well after being edited over half an hour in length. Due to Elfman being unable to return for scoring the film, as he was contractually obligated to work on Tim Burton's Alice in Wonderland (2010), Paul Haslinger replaced him and subsequently wrote a contemporary electronic score, which the studio felt inappropriate for the late 19th-century Gothic setting. Elfman's previously recorded original score is, as a result, the one that is used in the final film. His version of The Wolfman score was officially released on 23 February.

== Release ==
=== Merchandising ===
Several companies were involved in the merchandising of the film. Rubies Costumes produced both child and adult costumes. Because such costumes are sold to retailers months in advance, the Halloween costumes came out in 2009 since the film being pushed back to 2010 happened after the costumes had been shipped to retailers. Mezco Toyz produced 7 inch and 12 inch tall Wolfman action figures. They also produced replicas of the medallion from the film. In early January 2010, Mezco Toyz donated the prototypes of the toys to the Museum of the Moving Image in New York. A novelization by Jonathan Maberry was released on February 2, 2010, to coincide with the DVD re-release of the 1941 film, which went on the win the 2011 Scribe Award for best adapted novelisation.

=== Theatrical ===
The film was delayed several times during production and was previously scheduled to be released on November 14, 2008, February 13, 2009, April 3, 2009, and November 6, 2009. The film's first trailer was attached to Inglourious Basterds, released on August 21, 2009. The film was released on some European markets on February 10 and 11, 2010.

=== Home media ===
The film was released on DVD and Blu-ray on June 1, 2010. Both editions include the theatrical cut and an extended cut, restoring 17 minutes into the film. The Blu-ray Disc's special features include featurettes on the making of the film, including two alternate endings. The only special features included on the standard DVD are deleted and extended scenes. Best Buy released an exclusive 2-disc DVD set that includes a bonus disc featuring most of the BD special features. Upon the Blu-ray's release, viewers had the opportunity to stream the original 1941 film.

A 4K restoration of the theatrical and extended versions was released on Ultra HD Blu-ray on October 22, 2024, via Shout! Factory.

In the United States and Canada, the DVD grossed $21.8 million and the Blu-ray grossed $5.9 million, totaling $27.8 million in domestic video sales.

==== Extended cut ====
The DVD/Blu-ray releases include an "unrated director's cut", featuring an additional 17 minutes of footage and the inclusion of the classic '40s era Universal logo at the beginning of the film. Johnston said the reason for deleting the 17 minutes from the theatrical cut was "to push the story along so that audiences would get to the first Wolfman transformation sooner". The extra footage contains the origin of the silver cane-sword and also the uncredited and completely removed part played by Max von Sydow, who was the original owner of the cane. The character indicates that he obtained it in Gévaudan, a French province where, in the 18th century, villagers were attacked by an unknown beast known as the Beast of Gévaudan. Though Max von Sydow's credit is absent from the theatrical cut, there is still a credit for "Assistant to Mr. von Sydow".

== Reception ==
=== Box office ===
The film grossed $9.9 million on its first day, and $31.5 million in its opening weekend, coming in second at the box office after the film Valentine's Day. The Wolfman grossed $62.2 million domestically and $80.5 million internationally, grossing $142.6 million worldwide. In 2014, the Los Angeles Times added the film to their list of "costliest box office flops of all time".

=== Critical response ===
On Rotten Tomatoes, the film has an approval rating of 32% based on 220 reviews, with an average rating of 4.80/10. The site's critics consensus reads: "Suitably grand and special effects-laden, The Wolfman suffers from a suspense-deficient script and a surprising lack of genuine chills." On Metacritic, the film has a score of 43 out of 100 based on 36 critic reviews, indicating "mixed or average reviews". Audiences polled by CinemaScore gave the film an average grade of "C+" on an A+ to F scale.

Film critic Roger Ebert gave the film two and a half stars out of four, praising the atmospheric locations and melodramatic scope but lamenting CGI effects that he regarded as detrimental. Peter Travers of Rolling Stone assigned the film one and a half stars out of four, concluding that "The Wolfman bites, but not — I think — in the way the filmmakers intended." Owen Gleiberman of Entertainment Weekly praised Del Toro's performance as Lawrence Talbot, comparing it favourably to Lon Chaney Jr.'s, in the 1941 film.

At the 2011 Savannah Film Festival, Ronald Meyer, then-president of Universal Studios, regarded the film as "crappy" and considered it to be "One of the worst movies we ever made."

=== Awards ===
In 2010, The Wolfman won at the 37th Saturn Awards for best make-up. In 2011, makeup effects creator Rick Baker and supervisor Dave Elsey, received an Academy Award for Best Makeup at the 83rd Academy Awards.

== Reboots ==
Universal's 2012 film Werewolf: The Beast Among Us was originally planned as a spin-off from the film but was ultimately unrelated. Unlike The Wolfman, Werewolf was released direct-to-video.

Universal announced that it would reboot their Universal Monsters properties as part of a shared cinematic universe, with Alex Kurtzman and Chris Morgan attached to develop the structure of the shared universe, to be known as the Dark Universe. In November 2014, Universal hired Aaron Guzikowski to write the shared universe's reboot of The Wolf Man. In June 2016, Deadline reported that Dwayne Johnson may star as the character. In October 2016, it was reported that David Callaham was brought on board to rewrite the script. The first film in the Dark Universe, however, 2017's The Mummy, flopped at the box office, ending plans for any more such films. In May 2020, following the success of The Invisible Man, it was confirmed that a new Wolf Man film had entered development at Universal with Ryan Gosling set to star in the titular role. In October 2021, Deadline reported that Derek Cianfrance will direct the reboot. On December 12, 2023, it was confirmed that Leigh Whannell was back as a director, taking Cianfrance's place, and that Christopher Abbott was cast as the main character, replacing Gosling who will remain as the executive producer. The film was released on January 17, 2025.
