= Christopher Tucker =

British make-up artist for theatre and film (1941–2022)

- Born: 23 March 1941; Hertford, Hertfordshire, England
- Died: 14 December 2022 (aged 81)
- Occupations: Film and television make-up artist

Christopher Tucker (23 March 1941 – 14 December 2022) was a British make-up artist for theatre and film. He specialized in the creation of prosthetic make-up for horror films. Among his notable works were the make-up effects for The Elephant Man, The Company of Wolves, and the stage musical The Phantom of the Opera.

== Career ==
Tucker was born on 23 March 1941 in Hertford to Leslie and Leila (née Ison) Tucker. He trained as an opera singer at the Guildhall School of Music and Drama in London, and began experimenting with artificial noses when he was asked to perform in the opera Rigoletto. The results were well received, and in 1974 he abandoned a career in opera and became a full-time make-up artist. He worked from an 18th-century manor house in Berkshire, and was assisted by his wife Sinikka Ikaheimo.

Tucker's earliest credited work is the make-up for the 1970 film Julius Caesar, starring Charlton Heston and John Gielgud. He was also responsible for aging the characters in the BBC series I, Claudius. During 1975–76, he was part of the team that created the make-up and prosthetics for the iconic Mos Eisley Cantina scene in Star Wars.

In 1980, Tucker was hired to create the prosthetics that would transform John Hurt into the hideously deformed Joseph Merrick in David Lynch's film The Elephant Man. According to his website, the head "had 15 different sections, some of them overlapping never done before [sic], made in foam and silicone rubber. It took seven hours to apply." An appreciation of the work involved led to the creation of the Best Make-up category at the Academy Awards run by the Academy of Motion Picture Arts and Sciences, which was first awarded in 1981.

In the early 1980s, at the prompting of photographer Jay Myrdal, he fashioned a prosthetic that considerably enhanced the natural endowments of porn star Daniel Arthur Mead, who later gained notoriety under the pseudonym Long Dong Silver. Myrdal commented that Tucker "normally wouldn't have taken the job, but he was amused by the idea of making a cock". In 1983, he transformed Terry Jones into the fantastically obese Mr Creosote in Monty Python's The Meaning of Life. In 1984, he developed original forms of werewolf transformation in The Company of Wolves, in which a man is seen to tear his own skin off, after which his features elongate as he becomes a wolf, and in which a wolf emerges from another man's throat. Tucker attempted to create sequences in which men turned into wolves, rather than turning into creatures which were wolf-like, and the skin-tearing sequence was achieved by the actor initially removing a latex prosthesis from his own face, and as the transformation progressed, using three dummy figures, called Bert 1, 2 and 3. In 1986, he created the prosthetics for Michael Crawford in the musical adaptation of The Phantom of the Opera by Andrew Lloyd Webber.

In 2005, Tucker created the prosthetics for Amitabh Bachchan's character in the Indian film Black.

== Personal life ==
His first marriage to Marian Flint in 1971 ended in divorce. In 2013, he married Sinikka Ikaheimo, after more than 30 years together.

Tucker died from a streptococcus infection on 14 December 2022, at the age of 81.

== Awards ==
Tucker won the BAFTA award for Best Make-Up Artist in 1983 for his work on the film Quest for Fire. In 1985, he was nominated for BAFTA awards in the categories Best Make-Up Artist and Best Special Visual Effects for his work on The Company of Wolves.

Tucker was also the subject for a television documentary called Skintricks made in 1986 for Amsterdam TV. The documentary was made at the time that The Company of Wolves was being produced, and featured behind the scenes footage of the make-up process. It included interviews with the actors Ronald Pickup and John Hurt, talking about his make-up for The Elephant Man, and Terry Jones talking about the make-up for Mr. Creosote in the Monty Python film.
