= Dick Smith (make-up artist) =

American prosthetic makeup artist (1922–2014)

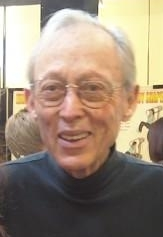
- Smith in 2009
- Born: Richard Emerson Smith; June 26, 1922; Larchmont, New York, U.S.
- Died: July 30, 2014 (aged 92); Los Angeles, California, U.S.
- Occupation: Special make-up effects artist
- Years active: 1945–1999
- Spouse: Jocelyn De Rosa (m. January 10, 1944)
- Children: 2

Richard Emerson Smith (June 26, 1922 – July 30, 2014) was an American special make-up effects artist and author, (nicknamed "The Godfather of Make-Up") known for his work on such films as Little Big Man (1970), The Godfather (1972), The Exorcist (1973), Taxi Driver (1976), Scanners (1981) and Death Becomes Her (1992). He won a 1985 Academy Award for Best Makeup for his work on Amadeus and received a 2012 Academy Honorary Award for his career's work.

== Early life ==
Smith was born in Larchmont, New York, the son of Coral (née Brown) and Richard Roy Smith. He attended the Wooster School in Danbury, Connecticut and Yale University, where he studied pre-med, with the intention of entering dentistry, although he majored in zoology. After reading a book on theatrical make-up techniques titled Paint, powder and make-up; the art of theater make-up from the amateur and class room viewpoint (Strauss, Ivard), he began applying make-up for the Yale drama group. After graduation, Smith served in the U.S. Army during World War II.

== Early career in television ==
Smith entered the field full-time after the war, and was entirely self-taught. He sent photographs of his work to the film industry, but his work was rejected until his father suggested he might try the emerging new medium of television. He was appointed as the first make-up director of WNBC (NBC's station in New York City), working there for fourteen years, often under producer David Susskind. Smith pioneered the development of prosthetic makeup, now better known as special make-up effects, from the basement of his home in Larchmont, New York, a district in which he lived through most of his life. His colleagues though, he commented in a 2008 interview, "tended to be secretive. There was not at all that much make-up work in New York – and Hollywood might as well have been on another planet. They weren’t eager to share anything; and the union did its best to discourage whatever inclination there might have been."

Prosthetic face masks were then normally made in one piece, but Smith made them in three foam latex pieces. Smith's technique allowed the actor to use their full range of facial expressions. Despite initial criticism from many professional make-up artists at the time, Smith's make-up techniques proved to be superior. The now standard methods of applying prosthetics to faces are those that Smith invented, according to Smith's protégé Rick Baker in a 2007 interview.

For a television adaptation of The Moon and Sixpence (1959), Smith was required to turn Laurence Olivier into a leprosy victim: "When I finished the make-up, he looked in the mirror and said, 'Dick, it does the acting for me.' I've never forgotten his words." Other early work by Smith was seen on Way Out (1961), a short-lived supernatural syndicated clone of Twilight Zone, produced by Susskind in New York City, and hosted by Roald Dahl. Most memorable was a make-up of a man (Barry Morse) who had half of his face suddenly erased by a spilled vial of photo retouching fluid that affected real people when merely applied to their photos. In another Way Out episode, a Hunchback of Notre-Dame make-up created by Smith becomes permanently affixed to an evil actor who then became his character and could never remove his make-up. Smith contributed to all 14 Way Out episodes, and other 1960s television shows as well.

In 1965, Smith published an instructional book, titled Dick Smith's Do-It-Yourself Monster Make-up Handbook, a special edition of Forrest J Ackerman's Famous Monsters of Filmland magazine series.

In 1967, Smith provided special make-up for two episodes of the supernatural soap opera Dark Shadows; in the storyline, vampire Barnabas Collins (played by Jonathan Frid) was undergoing medical treatment to change him into a living human being. The experiment goes drastically wrong, and Barnabas ages rapidly, to the appearance of a man over 175 years old. Smith said that designing the make-up appliances for Dark Shadows "turned out to be valuable preparation for Little Big Man."

== Film work (late 1960s–1975) ==
In the film Little Big Man (1970), the 30-something Dustin Hoffman played a man in extreme old age at several points in the film — similar, and with a very similar makeup design, to Smith's work making the 40-something actor Jonathan Frid look 175 years old in the film House of Dark Shadows (MGM, also 1970). (Note: Smith had worked previously with Hoffman developing his Ratso Rizzo character's make-up for Midnight Cowboy, 1969.) "In the original book of Little Big Man, Dustin's character is 110," Smith observed, "but the director Arthur Penn just said out of the blue one day: 'Let's make him 121 instead'. I worked six weeks on the old age make-up, using photographic references for every wrinkle." Smith also consulted Australian make-up artist Roy Ashton, having seen his work on the British horror film The Man Who Could Cheat Death (1959), in which Anton Diffring was made to appear of extreme old age.

Smith had to use other methods, as an alternative to prosthetics, to create an aged Don Corleone in The Godfather (1972) because Marlon Brando was unwilling to have such appliances applied because of time considerations. Instead, Smith used stipple effects moving across the face from the actor's eyes. A dental device called a "plumper" caused Brando's jowls to droop. To depict the bleeding of characters after they had been shot, Smith said he "created the first ever bleeding special effects in this movie by creating bladders that were hidden under a foam latex forehead, with a squib that detonated the bladder, allowing blood to pour through a pre-arranged hole in the middle of the forehead."

Smith was also one of the early pioneers of combining make-up with on-set "practical" special effects, beginning with The Exorcist (1973). Smith's expertise gained prominence and acclaim through the variety and ingenuity of his many effects for The Exorcist. "The Exorcist was really a turning point for make-up special effects," Rick Baker told The Washington Post in 2007. "Dick showed that makeup wasn't just about making people look scary or old, but had many applications. He figured out a way to make the welts swell up on Linda [Blair]'s stomach, to make her head spin around, and he created the vomit scenes." For the head spinning effect, Smith created a mechanical dummy.

== Film work (1975–1989) ==
Smith also created the make-up for Robert De Niro's Travis Bickle character in Taxi Driver (1976), as well as creating the effects for the blood-drenched finale.

Smith and Paul LeBlanc won the Academy Award for Best Makeup for their work on Amadeus (1984). Once again, he had to age a leading actor in the film. For the film he transformed the 44-year-old F. Murray Abraham, as Antonio Salieri, into an elderly man. "Once I looked into a mirror, at my face, I felt like it was completely convincing," Abraham once commented. "Actors have to feel like they are the person they are portraying. I think my work has helped many to achieve that," Smith once said.

Smith received a second Academy Award nomination for his work on Dad (1989), for which he was required to age Jack Lemmon, then in his mid-60s, into an octogenarian.

== Later life (1990–2014) ==
He later worked on films such as Death Becomes Her (1992), Forever Young (1992) and House on Haunted Hill (1999), his last credit. In later life, Smith concentrated on teaching his methods to up-and-coming make-up artists. Smith was awarded an Academy Honorary Award for his life's work in November 2011, the first ever make-up artist to be so honored.

Smith died in Los Angeles on July 30, 2014, at the age of 92, survived by two sons.

== Partial filmography ==
- House of Dark Shadows (1970), directed by Dan Curtis
- Little Big Man (1970), directed by Arthur Penn
- Who Is Harry Kellerman and Why Is He Saying Those Terrible Things About Me? (1971), directed by Ulu Grosbard
- The Godfather (1972), directed by Francis Ford Coppola
- The Exorcist (1973), directed by William Friedkin
- The Godfather Part II (1974), directed by Francis Ford Coppola
- The Sunshine Boys (1975), directed by Herbert Ross
- Taxi Driver (1976), directed by Martin Scorsese
- Marathon Man (1976), directed by John Schlesinger
- The Sentinel (1977), directed by Michael Winner
- Exorcist II: The Heretic (1977), directed by John Boorman
- The Deer Hunter (1978), directed by Michael Cimino
- Scanners (1981), directed by David Cronenberg
- The Fan (1981), directed by Edward Bianchi
- Nighthawks (1981), directed by Bruce Malmuth
- Ghost Story (1981), directed by John Irvin
- The Hunger (1983), directed by Tony Scott
- Spasms (1983), directed by William Fruet
- Starman (1984), directed by John Carpenter
- Amadeus (1984), directed by Miloš Forman
- Poltergeist III (1988), directed by Gary Sherman
- Sweet Home (1989), directed by Kiyoshi Kurosawa
- Tales from the Darkside: The Movie (1990), directed by John Harrison
- Death Becomes Her (1992), directed by Robert Zemeckis
- House on Haunted Hill (1999), directed by William Malone
