= Geoffrey Baumann =

American visual effects artist

- Occupation: Visual effects artist
- Years active: 2002–present

Geoffrey Baumann is an American visual effects artist. He was nominated for an Academy Award in the category Best Visual Effects for the film Black Panther: Wakanda Forever.

At the 72nd British Academy Film Awards, he won a BAFTA Award for Best Special Visual Effects for the film Black Panther. His win was shared with Jesse James Chisholm, Craig Hammack and Dan Sudick.

== Selected filmography ==
- The Time Machine (2002)
- xXx (2002)
- The Italian Job (2003)
- The Day After Tomorrow (2004)
- Stealth (2005)
- Flags of Our Fathers (2006)
- Letters from Iwo Jima (2006)
- Pirates of the Caribbean: At World's End (2007)
- Transformers (2007)
- Speed Racer (2008)
- The Mummy: Tomb of the Dragon Emperor (2008)
- G.I. Joe: The Rise of Cobra (2009)
- 2012 (2009)
- Percy Jackson & the Olympians: The Lightning Thief (2010)
- The A-Team (2010)
- Real Steel (2011)
- Goats (2012)
- The Avengers (2012)
- Jack the Giant Slayer (2013)
- G.I. Joe: Retaliation (2013)
- Oblivion (2013)
- Iron Man 3 (2013)
- Captain America: The Winter Soldier (2014)
- Avengers: Age of Ultron (2015)
- In the Heart of the Sea (2015)
- Captain America: Civil War (2016)
- Doctor Strange (2016)
- Black Panther (2018)
- Dark Phoenix (2019)
- Black Widow (2021)
- Black Panther: Wakanda Forever (2022)
- Ghostbusters: Frozen Empire (2024)
