= Donald Mowat =

Canadian-British makeup artist

Donald Mowat C.M.
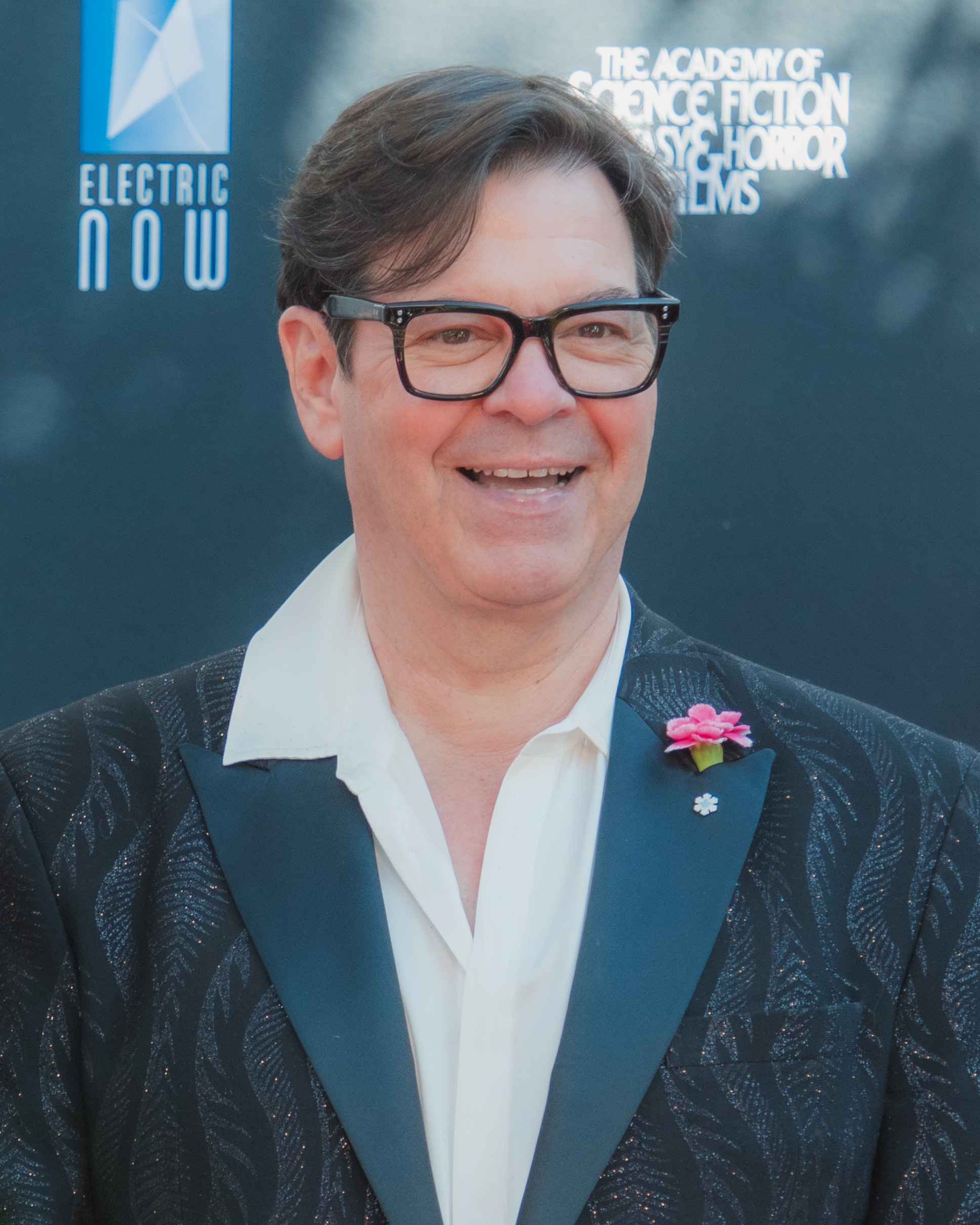
- Mowat in 2026
- Born: December 1963 (age 62); Montreal, Quebec, Canada
- Occupation: Makeup artist
- Years active: 1985–present
- Awards

Donald James Mowat, C.M., is a Canadian-British (naturalized American) makeup artist based in Los Angeles. He is best known for his work on 8 Mile, The Fighter, Prisoners, Skyfall, Nightcrawler, Sicario, Nocturnal Animals, Blade Runner 2049, First Man, and Dune. Originally from Montreal.

Donald was nominated for an Academy Award in the category Best Makeup and Hairstyling for the film Dune. He was appointed a member of the Order of Canada in 2022.

== Life and career ==
Donald was born and raised in Montreal, Quebec, Canada to British parents. He was invited to become a member of Academy of Motion Picture Arts and Sciences in 1999. He served on the board of directors for the Actors' Fund of Canada (2008–2014) and Board member representing the Art Department Branch of the Academy of Canadian Cinema & Television (2007–2011). He is an active member of the education and membership committee member for BAFTA Los Angeles and BAFTA UK. He served twelve years as an executive makeup artists branch member at AMPAS. He is also a member of IATSE, BECTU, and the European Film Academy. He is represented by United Talent Agency in Beverly Hills, California.

Donald was awarded a Queen Elizabeth II Diamond Jubilee Medal in 2012 and the Sovereign's Medal for Volunteers by The Governor General for Canada in 2018 for his volunteer work with high school students for BAFTA LA education outreach.

At the 2024 Hollywood Beauty Awards, Donald was honored with the Outstanding Achievement in Make-Up Award, presented by Dune star Dave Bautista. Additionally, he has served on juries for the Denver Film Festival and Middleburg Film Festival, and has been featured in numerous industry publications and podcasts, including The Team Deakins Podcast. He is an active volunteer for the annual Student Academy Awards and the Nicholl Fellowships in Screenwriting.

== Selected filmography ==
- Margaret's Museum (1995)
- Love! Valour! Compassion! (1997)
- Three Kings (1999)
- The Yards (2000)
- The Perfect Storm (2000)
- Rock Star (2001)
- 8 Mile (2002)
- The Fighter (2010)
- Skyfall (2012)
- Prisoners (2013)
- Nightcrawler (2014)
- Sicario (2015)
- Spectre (2015)
- Nocturnal Animals (2016)
- Stronger (2017)
- Blade Runner 2049 (2017)
- First Man (2018)
- The Little Things (2021)
- Dune (2021)
- The Guilty (2021)
- Moon Knight (2022)
- The Covenant (2023)
- Dune: Part Two (2024)
- Presumed Innocent (2024)

== Awards and nominations ==
Year	Result	Award	Category	Work	Ref.
1992	Won	Primetime Emmy Awards	Outstanding Makeup for a Miniseries or a Special	Mark Twain and Me	
1993	Won	CableACE Award	Best Make-Up	Mark Twain and Me	
1998	Won	Gemini Awards	Outstanding achievement in makeup	The Sleep Room	
2000	Nominated	Make-Up Artists and Hair Stylists Guild	Best Contemporary Makeup	Three Kings	
2003	Nominated	Make-Up Artists and Hair Stylists Guild	Best Contemporary Makeup	8 Mile	
2004	Nominated	Make-Up Artists and Hair Stylists Guild	Best Contemporary Makeup	The Human Stain	
2006	Won	Gemini Awards	Best Achievement in Make-Up	Prairie Giant	
2014	Won	Saturn Awards	Best Make-Up	Prisoners	
2014	Won	Make-Up Artists and Hair Stylists Guild	Best Contemporary Makeup	Prisoners	
2015	Nominated	Make-Up Artists and Hair Stylists Guild	Best Contemporary Makeup	Nightcrawler	
2016	Nominated	Make-Up Artists and Hair Stylists Guild	Best Contemporary Makeup	Sicario	
2017	Won	Make-Up Artists and Hair Stylists Guild	Best Contemporary Makeup	Nocturnal Animals	
2017	Nominated	BAFTA Film Awards	Best Make Up/Hair	Nocturnal Animals	
2018	Nominated	BAFTA Film Awards	Best Make Up/Hair	Blade Runner 2049	
2018	Nominated	Make-Up Artists and Hair Stylists Guild	Best Period and/or Character Makeup	Blade Runner 2049	
2022	Nominated	Academy Awards	Best Makeup and Hairstyling	Dune	
2022	Nominated	BAFTA Film Awards	Best Makeup and Hair	Dune	
2022	Nominated	Gold Derby	Makeup/Hair	Dune	
2022	Nominated	Hollywood Critics Association	Best Hair and Makeup	Dune	
2022	Nominated	Make-Up Artists and Hair Stylists Guild	Best Period and/or Character Makeup	Dune	
2022	Won	Saturn Awards	Best Make-up	Dune	
2024	Won	Saturn Awards	Best Make-up	The Covenant	
2024	Won	Satellite Awards	Special achievement awards : Make-Up		
2025	Nominated	Make-Up Artists & Hair Stylists Guild Awards	Best Make-Up	Daphne Guinness & David LaChapelle: "Time"	
2025	Nominated	Saturn Awards	Best Make-up	Dune: Part Two	
