= An American Werewolf in London =

1981 film by John Landis

- Theatrical release poster
- Directed by: John Landis
- Written by: John Landis
- Produced by: George Folsey Jr.
- Starring: David Naughton; Jenny Agutter; Griffin Dunne; John Woodvine
- Cinematography: Robert Paynter
- Edited by: Malcolm Campbell
- Music by: Elmer Bernstein
- Production companies: PolyGram Pictures; Lycanthrope Films, Ltd.; American Werewolf Inc.
- Distributed by: Universal Pictures (U.S.); Barber International Films (U.K.)
- Release dates: August 21, 1981 (U.S./Canada); November 12, 1981 (U.K.)
- Running time: 97 minutes
- Countries: United States; United Kingdom
- Language: English
- Budget: $5.8 million
- Box office: $62 million

An American Werewolf in London is a 1981 supernatural comedy horror film written and directed by John Landis. An international co-production of the United States and the United Kingdom, the film stars David Naughton, Jenny Agutter, Griffin Dunne, and John Woodvine. The title is a cross between An American in Paris and Werewolf of London. The film's plot follows two American backpackers, David Kessler and Jack Goodman, who are attacked by a werewolf while travelling in England, causing David to become a werewolf under the next full moon.

Landis wrote the first draft of the screenplay for the film in 1969 and shelved it for over a decade. Prospective financiers believed that Landis's script was too frightening to be a comedy film and too humorous to be a horror film. After achieving success in Hollywood with the comedies The Kentucky Fried Movie, National Lampoon's Animal House and The Blues Brothers, Landis was able to secure financing from PolyGram Pictures to produce An American Werewolf in London.

An American Werewolf in London was released in the US by Universal Pictures on August 21, 1981. It was a critical and commercial success, winning the 1981 Saturn Award for Best Horror Film and makeup artist Rick Baker winning the inaugural Academy Award for Best Makeup. Since its release, it has become a cult classic. A sequel, An American Werewolf in Paris, was released by Hollywood Pictures in 1997.

== Plot ==
The film's trailer

Two American graduate students from New York City, David Kessler and Jack Goodman, are trekking across the North York Moors. As night falls, they stop at the Slaughtered Lamb, a local pub. Jack notices a five-pointed star on the pub's wall. When he asks about it, the pub-goers grow hostile, prompting him and David to leave. The pub-goers warn the pair to stay on the road, stay clear of the moors, and beware the full moon. David and Jack wander off the road and onto the moors, where a vicious creature attacks them. Jack is mauled to death, and David is severely injured. The beast is shot and killed by some concerned pub-goers who followed the pair. Instead of an animal carcass, David sees a naked dead man lying next to him before passing out.

David wakes up three weeks later in a London hospital. Inspector Villiers interviews David and informs him that the locals reported that an escaped lunatic attacked him and Jack. David insists a rabid dog or wolf attacked them. An undead Jack later appears to David and explains that they were attacked by a werewolf; since David was bitten, he is now a werewolf too. Jack is cursed to walk the earth in limbo, neither dead nor alive, until the wolf's bloodline is severed. Jack urges David to kill himself before the next full moon so he does not harm anyone.

Dr. J. S. Hirsch visits the Slaughtered Lamb to investigate, suspecting that David might have been influenced by local superstitions. When asked about the incident, the pub-goers deny knowing anything about David, Jack, or the attack. However, one distraught pub-goer privately tells Dr. Hirsch that David will endanger other people when he transforms.

Upon being released from the hospital, David stays with Alex Price, the nurse who cared for him. Alex tells David that she is concerned about his mental health, as he has been having hyperrealistic dreams and nightmares. Jack, now even more decayed, appears and warns David that he will become a werewolf the following night and again advises him to commit suicide. David refuses to believe him, but when the full moon rises, he painfully transforms into a werewolf inside Alex's flat. He prowls the streets and the London Underground, killing six people. He wakes up the next morning naked on the floor of a wolf enclosure at the London Zoo with no recollection of what happened and returns to Alex's flat.

After learning of the previous night's murders and realizing that he is responsible, David unsuccessfully attempts to get himself arrested in Trafalgar Square. He calls his family to say he loves them, then loses the courage to slit his wrists with a pocket knife. David spots Jack, whose skeleton is now showing, outside an adult cinema. Inside, Jack introduces David to his previous night's victims, some of whom are furious with David and suggest different suicide methods to free them from their undead state.

David transforms into a werewolf while still in the theatre. He decapitates Inspector Villiers and wreaks havoc in the streets, killing several motorists and bystanders. The police surround and trap David in an alleyway. Alex arrives, runs down the alley, and tries to calm David by professing her love. Although David's consciousness briefly emerges to recognize Alex, the beast takes over and lunges towards her, forcing the police to shoot him dead. David's body reverts to human form in front of Alex as she mourns him.

== Cast ==
- David Naughton as David Kessler
- Jenny Agutter as Alex Price
- Griffin Dunne as Jack Goodman
- John Woodvine as Dr J. S. Hirsch
- Brian Glover as Chess Player
- Lila Kaye as The Barmaid
- David Scofield as The Darts Player
- Paul Kember as Sergeant McManus
- Frank Oz as Mr Collins
- Don McKillop as Inspector Villiers
- Rik Mayall as 2nd Chess Player
- Albert Moses as Hospital Porter
- Kermit the Frog as Himself (TV archival footage)
- Miss Piggy as Herself (TV archival footage)
- Paula Jacobs as Mrs Kessler
- Gordon Sterne as Mr Kessler
- Nina Carter as Nina "Naughty Nina"
- Geoffrey Burridge as Harry Berman
- Sydney Bromley as Alf
- Frank Singuineau as Ted
- Michael Carter as Gerald Bringsley
- Alan Ford as the Taxi Driver
- Linzi Drew as Brenda Bristols, "See You Next Wednesday" Cast

== Production ==
=== Development ===
John Landis came up with the story while he worked in Yugoslavia as a production assistant on the film Kelly's Heroes (1970). According to Landis, he and a Yugoslav member of the crew were driving in the back of a car on location when they came across a group of Romani people. The Romani people appeared to be performing rituals on a man being buried so that he would not "rise from the grave."

Landis wrote the first draft of An American Werewolf in London in 1969 and shelved it for over a decade. Two years later, Landis wrote, directed and starred in his debut film Schlock, which developed a cult following. Landis developed box-office status in Hollywood through the successful comedies, The Kentucky Fried Movie, Animal House and The Blues Brothers before securing $10 million financing from PolyGram Pictures for his werewolf film. Financiers believed that Landis' script was too frightening to be a comedy and too funny to be a horror film. Universal Studios execs were pressuring the director to cast Dan Aykroyd and John Belushi as David Kessler and Jack Goodman but Landis went with unknown actors instead.

=== Filming ===
Filming took place between February and March 1981 because director John Landis wanted the film to take place during poor weather. The moors were filmed around the Black Mountains in Wales and East Proctor is in reality the tiny village of Crickadarn, about six miles (9.7 km) southeast of Builth Wells off the A470. The Angel of Death statue was a prop added for the film, but the red phone box is real, though the Welsh road signs were covered by a fake tree. The pub shown in the film known as the Slaughtered Lamb was actually a cottage located in Crickadarn, and the interior scenes were filmed in the Black Swan, Old Lane, Martyrs Green in Surrey.

An American Werewolf in London was the first film allowed to shoot in Piccadilly Circus in 15 years. Landis accomplished this by inviting 300 members of Greater London's Metropolitan Police Service to a screening of his new film The Blues Brothers. The police were so impressed by his work that they granted the production a two-night filming permit between 1 and 4 a.m. Traffic was stopped only three times for two-minute increments to film the automobile stunts involving the double-decker bus. Other filming locations included Putney General Hospital, Chiswick Maternity Hospital, Redcliffe Square in Earl's Court, the area around Tower Bridge, South Kensington Underground station, Tottenham Court Road Underground station, London Zoo, Putney High Street, Belgravia, Hampstead and Southwark. Filming also took place at Twickenham Film Studios in Richmond Upon Thames.

=== Music ===
The film's upbeat soundtrack consists of songs which refer to the moon. Bobby Vinton's slow, soothing version of "Blue Moon" plays during the opening credits, Van Morrison's "Moondance" plays as David (David Naughton) and Alex Price (Jenny Agutter) make love for the first time, Creedence Clearwater Revival's "Bad Moon Rising" plays as David nears the moment of changing to the werewolf, a soft, bittersweet ballad version of "Blue Moon" by Sam Cooke plays during the agonizing wolf transformation and the Marcels' doo-wop version of "Blue Moon" plays over the end credits.

The score was composed and conducted by Elmer Bernstein and recorded at Olympic Studios in London, engineered by Keith Grant. Bernstein's score can be heard during David's nightmares, when Dr J. S. Hirsch (John Woodvine) drives through the moors to East Proctor and when Alex confronts David in the alley. Though Bernstein wrote and recorded music to accompany the transformation scene, the director chose not to use it. The three-minute passage was eventually released by Bernstein under the title "Metamorphosis".

While an official soundtrack album was never released, Meco produced Impressions of An American Werewolf in London which was released by Casablanca Records. The album was produced and arranged by Meco, featuring covers of Bernstein's score and three songs from the movie, and four original songs.

== Home media ==
The film was first released in 1981 on VHS and Betamax under the MCA Videocassette Inc. label and on LaserDisc and CED under the MCA Videodisc label. In 1984, MCA Home Video released it on LaserDisc. This would be the last time Universal would release the movie on home video for 17 years. The following year, Vestron Video acquired the video rights from MCA/Universal and released it on VHS, Betamax and LaserDisc in 1985. It was released again on LaserDisc in 1989 (under Image Entertainment through Vestron) and 1995 (under LIVE Entertainment), and again on VHS in 1990 under the Video Treasures label and 1991 and 1994 from Vestron Video (through LIVE Home Video).

The film was first released on DVD in December 1997 by LIVE Entertainment. It was presented in a non-anamorphic widescreen transfer and contained the film's theatrical teaser trailer. Universal eventually got the video rights back and released a 20th-anniversary "Collector's Edition" DVD on September 18, 2001, making it the first time Universal released the film on home video since 1984. It included an audio commentary with actors David Naughton and Griffin Dunne, interviews with John Landis and Rick Baker, a 1981 promotional featurette, silent outtakes, storyboards and production photographs. A coinciding VHS was released on the same day. The high-definition version of the film was first released on HD DVD by Universal on November 28, 2006. A high-definition Blu-ray Disc and 2-disc standard-definition Region 1 DVD release of the film titled An American Werewolf in London – Full Moon Edition was released by Universal on September 15, 2009. The Region 2 DVDs and Blu-ray were released on September 28 and are known as An American Werewolf in London – Special Edition.

In 2016, Universal re-released the film on Blu-ray as a restored edition to commemorate the 35th anniversary of the film's release. On October 29, 2019, Arrow Video released a 4K restoration as part of a Blu-ray box set that contains all previously released extra material; the documentary Mark of The Beast: The Legacy of the Universal Werewolf; the 2009 making-of documentary Beware the Moon; filmmaker Jon Spira's video essay "I Think He's a Jew: The Werewolf's Secret;" a new interview with Landis; lobby cards and a booklet.

== Reception ==
=== Box office ===
An American Werewolf in London was released August 21, 1981, and grossed $30 million at the box office in the United States and Canada It was felt that the performance suffered due to being released after The Howling in March and Wolfen in July. In Australia, it was the highest-grossing film of the year and performed very well in the United Kingdom. It grossed $62 million worldwide against the budget of under $6 million.

=== Critical response ===
At the time of its release, Roger Ebert reviewed the film unfavorably, giving it two out of four stars and writing, "An American Werewolf in London seems curiously unfinished, as if director John Landis spent all his energy on spectacular set pieces and then didn't want to bother with things like transitions, character development or an ending."

In retrospective reviews, critics have extolled the film as a cult classic. Halliwell's Film Guide described it as a "curious but oddly endearing mixture of horror film and spoof, of comedy and shock, with everything grist to its mill including tourist Britain and the wedding of Prince Charles. The special effects are notable and signaled new developments in this field." Entertainment Weekly listed it in their 1996 "Greatest Movies Ever Made", saying that the transformation effects by Rick Baker changed the face of horror makeup in the 1980s. In his book Comedy-Horror Films: A Chronological History, 1914-2008, Bruce G. Hallenbeck lambasted the film's inconsistent tone, juvenile humor, poor direction and emphasis on shock value to the detriment of continuity and plot. He cited Rick Baker's makeup effects and Jenny Agutter's performance as genuinely powerful, but concluded that "thanks to the director's insincerity, slapdash approach and what appears to be a thinly veiled contempt for the material, [An American Werewolf in London] succeeds neither as comedy nor as horror."

On the review aggregator website Rotten Tomatoes, 81% of 154 critics' reviews are positive, with an average rating of 7.8/10. The website's consensus reads: "A remarkable blend of horror and comedy, An American Werewolf in London goes for the jugular with frenetic direction, macabre wit, and astounding creature effects from Rick Baker." On Metacritic, the film has a score of 55 out of 100 based on reviews from 15 critics, indicating "mixed or average" reviews. Kim Newman of Empire magazine gave the film a rating of four out of five stars, writing that "carnivorous lunar activities rarely come any more entertaining than this". Tom Huddleston of Time Out also gave the film a positive review, calling it "not just gory but actually frightening, not just funny but clever".

=== Awards and accolades ===
At the 54th Academy Awards, Rick Baker won the first-ever Academy Award for Best Makeup. During the 9th Saturn Awards, the film won Best Horror Film and Best Makeup and was nominated for Best Actress (Jenny Agutter) and Best Writing (John Landis).

A 2008 Empire magazine poll of critics and readers named An American Werewolf in London as the 107th-greatest film of all time.

== Legacy ==
=== Media recognition ===
An American Werewolf in London is chiefly appreciated as a milestone in the comedy-horror genre and for its innovative makeup effects. The Daily Telegraph stated that it was "the first mainstream hit which managed to make its gross-out effects simultaneously shocking and hilarious" and called the signature werewolf transformation scene "stunningly ingenious, without a computer effect in sight, but also suffused with squirm-inducing agony". The Telegraph also cited the slew of 1980s genre films which came after An American Werewolf in London and followed the film's example of blending visceral horror effects with comedy, such as Beetlejuice, Gremlins and Evil Dead 2. Director Edgar Wright (Shaun of the Dead) cited the film as a major inspiration for his own film-making and a milestone in the genre. The low budget independent film The Snarling (2018) was heavily inspired by Landis's film and contains various motifs and references including a cameo by Albert Moses paying direct tribute to his role in the film.

Pat Reid of Empire, reviewing the film in 2000, thought that the blending of comedic and horror elements "don't always sit well side-by-side," but called the transformation scene "undoubtedly a classic" because of its "good old-fashioned makeup and trickery making the incredible seem real."

Rolling Stone's Joshua Rothkopf, writing on the 35th anniversary of the film's release, called An American Werewolf in London an "allegory of exoticized Jewishness". This is embodied by the character of David and his growing awareness of his "otherness" as a werewolf alongside his own outsider status as a Jewish American in England. "Hiding a secret deep within one's body, strange urges, xenophobic glances, accusatory feelings of guilt: David's condition already has a name, and this won't be the first film in which Jewish otherness is made monstrous." The article also celebrated the film as an innovative mix of humor and horror, "a landmark in startling makeup effects", and "a riotous piece of fish-out-of-water college humor."

Michael Jackson, who was a fan of the film, chose John Landis to direct and Rick Baker to direct makeup effects for his 1983 "Thriller" music video based on the strength of their work in An American Werewolf in London. It went on to become one of the most lauded music videos of all time.

=== Director's regrets ===
Director John Landis has expressed regret over changing or cutting certain scenes to secure an R-rating in the United States. The sex scene between Alex and David was edited to be less explicit and an extended scene showing the homeless men along the Thames being attacked by the werewolf was eliminated after a test audience reacted negatively to it. Another showed the undead Jack (Dunne) eating a piece of toast which falls out of his torn throat. Landis also concluded that the werewolf transformation scene should have been shorter; he was so fascinated by the quality of Rick Baker's effects that he spent more time on the scene than he otherwise would have.

=== Radio adaptation ===
A radio adaptation of the film was broadcast on BBC Radio 1 in 1997, produced by Dirk Maggs and featuring Jenny Agutter, Brian Glover and John Woodvine reprising the roles of Alex Price, the chess player (now named George Hackett and with a more significant role as East Proctor's special constable), and Dr. Hirsch, respectively. The roles of David and Jack were played by Eric Meyers and William Dufris.

=== Sequel ===
The film was followed by a sequel, An American Werewolf in Paris, released in 1997. The sequel features a completely different cast and crew, with Isabelle Constantini as Alex, and was distributed by Disney's Hollywood Pictures in North America and France's Metropolitan Filmexport, Benelux's Columbia TriStar Film Distributors International, and J&M Entertainment in other territories. It was poorly received by critics and flopped at the box office.

=== Retrospective documentary ===
In 2009, a retrospective documentary film, Beware the Moon: Remembering An American Werewolf in London, was released. An accompanying book by the documentary's director, Paul Davis, was published in 2016.

=== Proposed remake ===
In June 2009, it was announced that Dimension Films was working with producers Sean and Bryan Furst on a remake of the film. This has since been delayed due to other commitments. In August 2016, several reports suggested that Max Landis (son of director John Landis) was considering remaking the film. In November 2016, Deadline Hollywood reported that Max Landis would write and direct a remake. In December 2017, Max Landis confirmed on Twitter that he had completed the first draft of the script. But beginning in late 2017, accusations by a number of women that Landis had abused them emotionally or sexually began to emerge publicly. In the wake of those allegations, it remains unknown if Landis will be replaced or if the project will be put on indefinite hold.

In November 2019, Variety reported that Robert Kirkman, creator of The Walking Dead comic book series, was in consideration as a producer for a reboot of An American Werewolf in London.

== See also ==
- "Deer Woman", a 2005 episode of Masters of Horror directed by Landis that references events in An American Werewolf in London as though they are actually happening
- Frostbiten, a 2006 Swedish vampire film influenced in part by An American Werewolf in London
- Junoon, a 1992 Bollywood film with a similar plot to An American Werewolf in London
- List of cult films
