= John Blake (make-up artist) =

American make-up artist

- Occupation: make-up artist
- Years active: 1985 to present

John Blake is an American make-up artist. He has been nominated for one Academy Award, for the film Hoffa. He shared the nomination with Ve Neill and Greg Cannom. He has worked on films for directors like Oliver Stone and the Coen brothers as key make-up artist on Nixon, U Turn, and Fargo. In more recent years, he has worked on The Avengers, the Iron Man trilogy, There Will Be Blood, Tropic Thunder, and many other films over a 30-year career.

== Awards ==
=== Phoenix Film Critics Society Awards ===
- Planet of the Apes (2001 film)
