= Rick Baker =

American former special make-up effects creator and actor (born 1950)

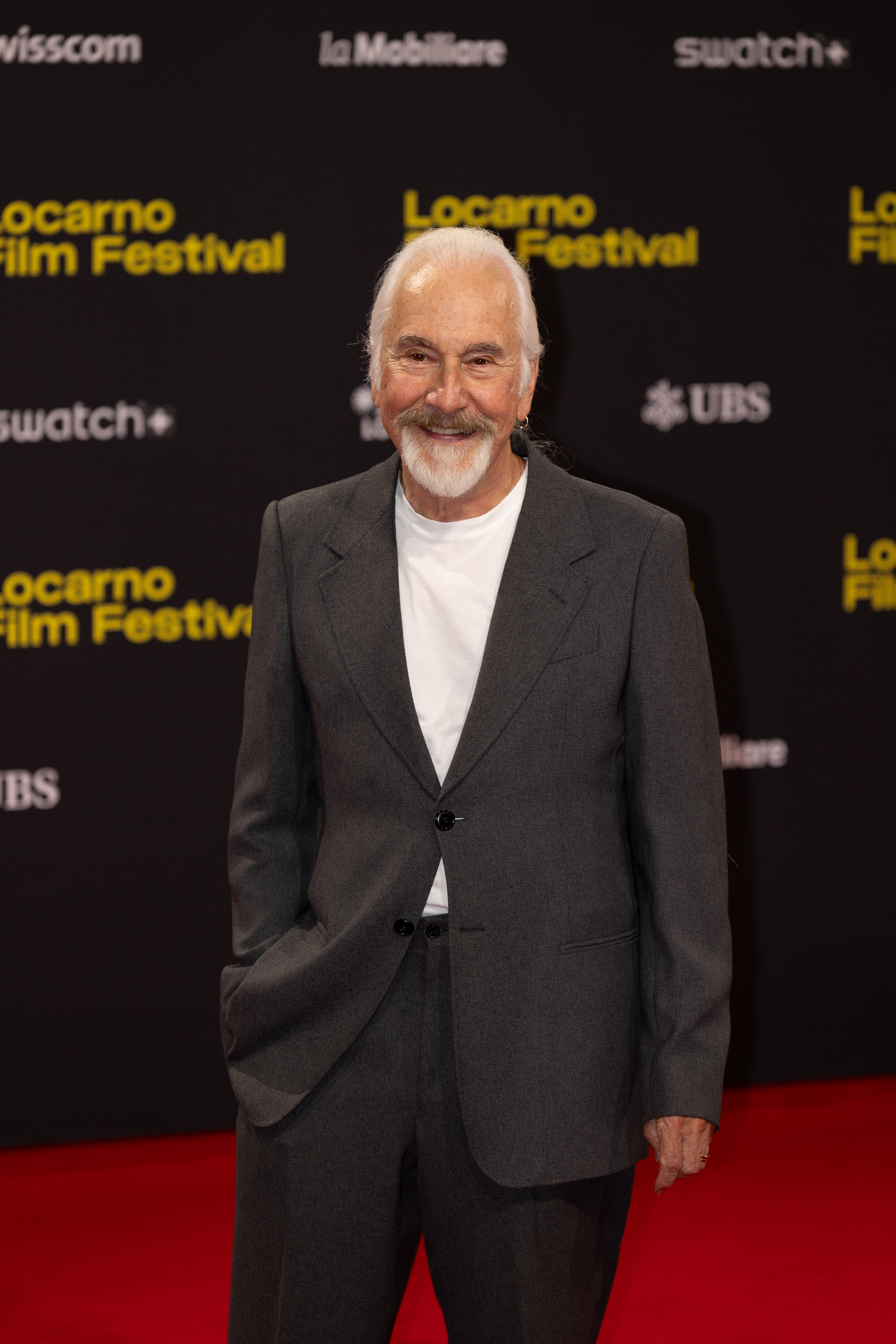
- Baker in 2026
- Born: Richard Alan Baker; December 8, 1950 (age 75); Binghamton, New York, U.S.
- Education: Academy of Art University (BA)
- Occupations: Special make-up effects; artist; actor
- Years active: 1967–present
- Spouses: Elaine Baker (m. 1974; div. 1984) Silvia Abascal (m. 1987)
- Children: 2

Richard Alan Baker (born December 8, 1950) is an American actor and retired special make-up effects creator. He is mostly known for his creature designs and effects. Baker has won the Academy Award for Best Makeup a record seven times from a record eleven nominations, beginning with his win in the first year of the category's existence, for the 1981 horror comedy An American Werewolf in London.

== Early life ==
Baker was born on December 8, 1950, in Binghamton, New York, to Doris (née Hamlin), a bank teller, and Ralph B. Baker, a professional artist. He and his family moved to Covina, California when he was less than one year old.

== Career ==
As a teenager, Baker began creating artificial body parts in his own kitchen. He also appeared briefly in the fan production The Night Turkey, a one-hour, black-and-white video parody of The Night Stalker (1972), directed by William Malone. Among Baker's first professional jobs was assisting prosthetic makeup effects veteran Dick Smith on the 1973 film The Exorcist. While working on The Exorcist, Baker was hired by director Larry Cohen to design and create a mutant infant for Cohen's 1974 film It's Alive.

At the 54th Academy Awards, Baker received the inaugural Academy Award for Best Makeup for his work on An American Werewolf in London (1981). Subsequently, he has been nominated for Best Makeup ten more times, winning on seven occasions, both records in his field. His other Oscars came from Harry and the Hendersons, Ed Wood, The Nutty Professor, Men In Black, How The Grinch Stole Christmas and The Wolfman. Baker was also brought in by An American Werewolf in London John Landis to the music video Thriller (1983), where Baker created the werecat creature Michael Jackson transforms into and multiple zombies that dance alongside Jackson.

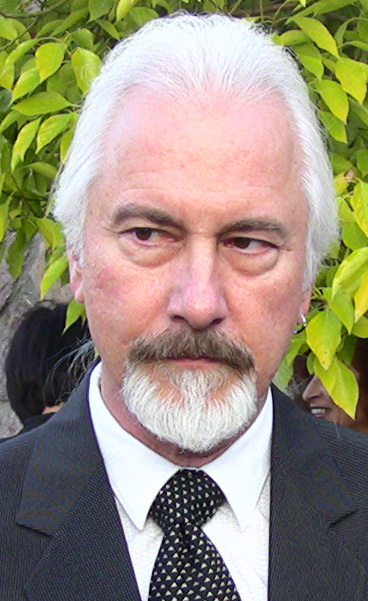
Baker at the 37th Saturn Awards in 2011

In 2008, he was awarded a Doctorate of Humane Letters from the Academy of Art University in San Francisco. Baker also contributes commentaries to the web series Trailers from Hell for trailers about horror and science fiction films. Baker claims that his work on Harry and the Hendersons (1987) is one of his proudest achievements, for which he won his second Oscar. On October 3, 2009, he received the Jack Pierce Lifetime Achievement Award at the Chiller-Eyegore Awards.

On November 30, 2012, Baker received the 2485th star of the Hollywood Walk of Fame. The star is located in front of the Guinness World Records Museum.

On May 28, 2015, Baker announced his retirement, saying: "First of all, the CG stuff definitely took away the animatronics part of what I do. It's also starting to take away the makeup part. The time is right, I am 64 years old, and the business is crazy right now. I like to do things right, and they wanted cheap and fast. That is not what I want to do, so I just decided it is basically time to get out. I would consider designing and consulting on something, but I don't think I will have a huge working studio anymore."

In 2018, when Baker's daughter Veronica was working at DC Comics, he was approached by DC to design a collectible display bust. He agreed on the condition of total creative freedom; working with his long-time mold maker Rob Freitas, he created a bust of The Joker.

== Acting roles ==
Baker played the title role in the 1976 remake of King Kong. He had initially only been hired to create an ape suit that would fill in for scenes where it was not practical to use a life-sized mechanical version of Kong that had been designed by Carlo Rambaldi, but problems with Rambaldi's creation resulted in Baker playing Kong on-screen for almost all of the film. In the 2005 remake, he had a cameo as the pilot and gunner (with director Peter Jackson) who shot down Kong. He has also made cameo appearances in: Michael Jackson's music video Thriller (1983) as "Zombie Opening the Crypt"; Into the Night (1985) as a drug dealer with a business card; Men in Black II (2002) as "MIB Passport Control Agent", an MIB agent helping provide aliens with disguises; Men in Black 3 (2012) as "Brain Alien"; The Wolfman (2010) as "Gypsy Man / First Killed"; The Strain as a convenience store customer (2014, Episode 8, uncredited) and Rings (2017) as a flea market vendor.

== Personal life ==
Baker is married; he was previously married to Elaine Melba Parkyn for ten years. He met his second wife, hairstylist Silvia Abascal, while they were both working on Into the Night (1985). Baker and Abascal had their first daughter 1989 and their second in 1993.

== Selected filmography ==
- Octaman (1971) (Octaman costume; co-created with Doug Beswick)
- The Thing with Two Heads (1972) (special effects - uncredited)
- Schlock (1973) (makeup artist / actor)
- Live and Let Die (1973) (makeup artist - inflated Kananga, dummy Samedi, Mr Big - uncredited)
- The Exorcist (1973) (special effects assistant - uncredited)
- It's Alive (1974) (makeup artist / special makeup effects artist - uncredited)
- The Autobiography of Miss Jane Pittman (1974) (makeup creator: Miss Tyson)
- King Kong (1976) (makeup effects - uncredited / special contributions: Kong / actor)
- Track of the Moon Beast (1976) (makeup artist)
- Squirm (1976) (makeup designer)
- The Incredible Melting Man (1977) (special makeup effects / actor)
- Star Wars (1977) (makeup: second unit)
- The Fury (1978) (special makeup effects)
- The Empire Strikes Back (1980) (makeup artist - uncredited)
- The Incredible Shrinking Woman (1981) (creator and designer: Sidney / makeup effects / actor)
- The Howling (1981) (special makeup effects consultant)
- The Funhouse (1981) (special makeup design)
- An American Werewolf in London (1981) (special makeup effects designer and creator)
- Videodrome (1983) (special makeup effects designer)
- Thriller (1983) (special makeup effects designer and creator / actor)
- Greystoke: The Legend of Tarzan, Lord of the Apes (1984) (special makeup effects)
- Starman (1984) (Starman transformation)
- Into the Night (1985) (actor)
- My Science Project (1985) (special makeup effects artist - uncredited)
- Captain EO (1986) (special makeup effects)
- Ratboy (1986) (designer: Ratboy)
- Harry and the Hendersons (1987) (creature designer: Harry / puppeteer / makeup artist)
- Beauty and the Beast (1987–89) (designer and creator)
- Werewolf (1987–88) (werewolf characters designer)
- Coming to America (1988) (special makeup effects)
- Gorillas in the Mist (1988) (special makeup effects / associate producer)
- Missing Link (1988) (special makeup effects)
- Gremlins 2: The New Batch (1990) (special effects supervisor / co-producer)
- The Rocketeer (1991) (makeup creator: Lothar)
- Wolf (1994) (special makeup effects)
- Ed Wood (1994) (makeup creator: Bela Lugosi / makeup designer: Bela Lugosi)
- Batman Forever (1995) (special makeup designer and creator)
- The Nutty Professor (1996) (special makeup effects)
- The Frighteners (1996) (special makeup artist: The Judge)
- Escape from L.A. (1996) (special makeup effects)
- Ghosts (1997) (special makeup effects artist)
- Men in Black (1997) (alien makeup effects / special makeup effects artist)
- Critical Care (1997) (special makeup effects: Mr. Brooks)
- Mighty Joe Young (1998) (special makeup effects / creature designer and producer: Mighty Joe Young)
- Psycho (1998) (special makeup effects artist)
- Life (1999) (special makeup effects)
- Wild Wild West (1999) (special makeup effects)
- How the Grinch Stole Christmas (2000) (special makeup effects / actor)
- Nutty Professor II: The Klumps (2000) (special makeup effects)
- Planet of the Apes (2001) (makeup artist / special makeup effects designer and creator / actor)
- Men in Black II (2002) (alien makeup effects / special makeup effects artist - uncredited / actor)
- The Ring (2002) (special makeup effects artist)
- The Haunted Mansion (2003) (special makeup effects designer and creator)
- Hellboy (2004) (makeup consultant: Hellboy / special effects director)
- The Ring Two (2005) (special makeup effects artist)
- King Kong (2005) (actor)
- Cursed (2005) (special makeup effects artist / special makeup effects creator / special makeup effects designer)
- X-Men: The Last Stand (2006) (special makeup effects consultant)
- Click (2006) (special age makeup artist - uncredited / special makeup effects)
- Enchanted (2007) (special makeup effects artist)
- Norbit (2007) (special makeup effects artist)
- Tropic Thunder (2008) (makeup designer: Mr. Downey Jr.)
- The Wolfman (2010) (special makeup effects / actor)
- Tron: Legacy (2010) (special makeup effects artist)
- Men in Black 3 (2012) (alien makeup effects / actor)
- Maleficent (2014) (makeup designer: Maleficent)
- Rings (2017) (actor)
- V/H/S/Halloween (2025) (actor / segment: "Home Haunt")

== Awards and nominations ==
=== Academy Awards ===
Year	Nominated work	Category	Result
1982	An American Werewolf in London	Best Makeup	Won
1985	Greystoke: The Legend of Tarzan, Lord of the Apes	Best Makeup	Nominated
1988	Harry and the Hendersons	Best Makeup	Won
1989	Coming to America	Best Makeup	Nominated
1995	Ed Wood	Best Makeup	Won
1997	The Nutty Professor	Best Makeup	Won
1998	Men in Black	Best Makeup	Won
2000	Life	Best Makeup	Nominated
2001	How the Grinch Stole Christmas	Best Makeup	Won
2008	Norbit	Best Makeup	Nominated
2011	The Wolfman	Best Makeup	Won

=== BAFTA Awards ===
Year	Nominated work	Category	Result
1985	Greystoke: The Legend of Tarzan, Lord of the Apes	Best Make Up/Hair	Won
1996	Ed Wood	Best Make Up/Hair	Nominated
1997	The Nutty Professor	Best Make Up/Hair	Won
1998	Men in Black	Best Special Effects	Nominated
2001	How the Grinch Stole Christmas	Best Make Up/Hair	Won
2002	Planet of the Apes	Best Make Up/Hair	Nominated

=== Saturn Awards ===
Year	Nominated work	Category	Result
1978	Star Wars	Best Make-up	Won
1979	The Fury	Best Make-up	Won
1981	The Howling	Best Make-up	Nominated
1982	An American Werewolf in London	Best Make-up	Won
1988	Harry and the Hendersons	Best Make-up	Nominated
1991	Gremlins 2: The New Batch	Best Special Effects	Nominated
1995	Ed Wood	Best Make-up	Won
1995	Wolf	Best Make-up	Nominated
1996	Batman Forever	Best Make-up	Nominated
1997	The Nutty Professor	Best Make-up	Won
1997	The Frighteners	Best Make-up	Nominated
1998	Men in Black	Best Special Effects	Nominated
1998	Men in Black	Best Make-up	Nominated
1999	Mighty Joe Young	Best Special Effects	Nominated
2001	How the Grinch Stole Christmas	Best Make-up	Won
2001	Nutty Professor II: The Klumps	Best Make-up	Nominated
2002	Planet of the Apes	Best Make-up	Nominated
2003	The Ring	Best Make-up	Nominated
2004	The Haunted Mansion	Best Make-up	Nominated
2011	The Wolfman	Best Make-up	Won

=== Other awards ===
- 2485th star on the Hollywood Walk of Fame
- Vincent Price Award at the 2025 Hollywood Horrorfest
- Time Machine Award at the 2015 Sitges Film Festival
- Doctorate of Humane Letters from the Academy of Art University
- Jack Pierce Lifetime Achievement Award at the Chiller-Eyegore Awards
- Inducted in the Monster Kid Hall of Fame at the Rondo Hatton Classic Horror Awards
- Primetime Emmy Award for Outstanding Achievement in Makeup for The Autobiography of Miss Jane Pittman (1974)

== See also ==
- Prosthetic makeup
- Special effect
