= Satellite Award for Outstanding Platform Action/Adventure Game =

Retired annual media award

The Satellite Award for Outstanding Platform Action/Adventure Game is an annual award given by the International Press Academy as one of its Satellite Awards.

== Winners and nominees ==
Year	Winners and nominees	Developer	Publisher
2004 (winner unknown)	Grand Theft Auto: San Andreas	Rockstar North	Rockstar Games
2004 (winner unknown)	Call of Duty: Finest Hour	Spark Unlimited, Exakt Entertainment	Activision, Capcom
2004 (winner unknown)	Halo 2	Bungie	Microsoft Game Studios
2004 (winner unknown)	Mortal Kombat: Deception	Midway Games	Midway Games
2004 (winner unknown)	Metroid Prime 2: Echoes	Retro Studios, Nintendo	Nintendo
2004 (winner unknown)	Doom 3	id Software	Activision
2005	Mortal Kombat: Shaolin Monks	Midway Games	Midway Games
2005	Area 51	Midway Studios Austin	Midway Games
2005	Battlefield 2: Modern Combat	Electronic Arts	Electronic Arts
2005	Call of Duty 2	Infinity Ward	Activision, Konami
2005	Death by Degrees	Namco	Namco Bandai Games
2005	Oddworld: Stranger's Wrath	Oddworld Inhabitants, Just Add Water	Electronic Arts
2005	Psychonauts	Double Fine Productions	Majesco
2005	Tak: The Great Juju Challenge	Avalanche Software, Altron, WayForward Technologies	THQ
2006	New Super Mario Bros.	Nintendo	Nintendo
2006	F.E.A.R.	Monolith Productions	Sierra Entertainment
2006	Ghost Recon Advanced Warfighter	Ubisoft, Red Storm Entertainment, Darkworks, Grin	Ubisoft
2006	Metroid Prime Hunters	Nintendo	Nintendo
2006	Ōkami	Clover Studio	Capcom
2007	God of War II	Santa Monica Studio	Sony Computer Entertainment
2007	BioShock	2K Boston, 2K Australia	2K Games, Feral Interactive
2007	Gears of War	Epic Games, People Can Fly	Microsoft Studios
2007	Metal Gear Solid: Portable Ops	Kojima Productions	Konami
2007	Zelda Twilight Princess	Nintendo	Nintendo
2008	Metal Gear Solid 4: Guns of the Patriots	Kojima Productions	Konami
2008	Dead Space	IronMonkey Studios	Electronic Arts
2008	LittleBigPlanet	Media Molecule	Sony Computer Entertainment
2008	Super Mario Galaxy	Nintendo	Nintendo
2008	Super Smash Bros. Brawl	Nintendo	Nintendo
2011	Batman: Arkham City	Rocksteady Studios	Warner Bros. Interactive Entertainment
2011	Legend of Zelda: Skyward Sword	Nintendo	Nintendo
2011	Limbo	Playdead, Double Eleven	Microsoft Studios, Playdead
2011	Portal 2	Valve	Valve
2012	Dishonored	Arkane Studios	Bethesda
2012	Assassin's Creed III	Ubisoft	Ubisoft
2012	Binary Domain	Yakuza Team, Devil's Details	Sega
2012	Minecraft: Xbox 360 Edition	Mojang	Mojang, Microsoft Studios, Sony Computer Entertainment
2012	The Walking Dead Episode 5	Telltale Games	Telltale Games, Square Enix
2013	Battlefield 4	Electronic Arts	Electronic Arts
2013	Beyond: Two Souls	Quantic Dream	Sony Computer Entertainment
2013	BioShock Infinite	Irrational Games	2K Games
2013	Crysis 3	Crytek	Electronic Arts
2013	Grand Theft Auto V	Rockstar North	Rockstar Games
2014	Forza Horizon 2	Playground Games	Microsoft Studios
2014	Assassin's Creed Unity	Ubisoft	Ubisoft
2014	Borderlands: The Pre-sequel	Gearbox Software	2K Games
2014	Dark Souls II	FromSoftware	Bandai Namco Entertainment
2014	Mario Kart 8	Nintendo	Nintendo
2014	Titanfall	Respawn Entertainment	Electronic Arts
2015	Rise of the Tomb Raider	Crystal Dynamics	Microsoft Studios, Square Enix
2015	Call of Duty: Black Ops III	Treyarch	Activision
2015	Fallout 4	Bethesda	Bethesda
2015	Halo 5: Guardians	343 Industries	Microsoft Studios
2015	The Room Three	Fireproof Games	Fireproof Games
2015	Star Wars Battlefront	Electronic Arts	Electronic Arts
2015	The Witcher 3: Wild Hunt	CD Projekt Red	CD Projekt
2016	Dark Souls III	FromSoftware	Bandai Namco Entertainment
2016	Battlefield 1	Electronic Arts	Electronic Arts
2016	Dishonored 2	Arkane Studios	Bethesda
2016	Overwatch	Blizzard Entertainment	Blizzard Entertainment
2016	Titanfall 2	Respawn Entertainment	Electronic Arts
