= 17th Satellite Awards =

US awards ceremony for film and television

- Date: December 16, 2012

Highlights
- Best film: Silver Linings Playbook
- Best television drama: Homeland
- Best television musical/comedy: The Big Bang Theory
- Best director: David O. Russell for Silver Linings Playbook

The 17th Satellite Awards is an award ceremony honoring the year's outstanding performers, films, television shows, home videos and interactive media, presented by the International Press Academy at the Hyatt Regency Century Plaza in Century City, Los Angeles.

The nominations were announced on December 3, 2012. The winners were announced on December 16, 2012.

The film Silver Linings Playbook won the most film awards with five, including Best Film and Best Director (David O. Russell). On the television side, The Big Bang Theory and Homeland won the most awards, with each winning three.

== Special achievement awards ==
- Auteur Award (for singular vision and unique artistic control over the elements of production) – Paul Williams
- Humanitarian Award (for making a difference in the lives of those in the artistic community and beyond) – Benh Zeitlin (Beasts of the Southern Wild)
- Mary Pickford Award (for outstanding contribution to the entertainment industry) – Terence Stamp
- Nikola Tesla Award (for visionary achievement in filmmaking technology) – Walter Murch
- Honorary Satellite Award – Bruce Davison and Brian Edwards
- Newcomer Award – Quvenzhané Wallis (Beasts of the Southern Wild)

== Motion picture winners and nominees ==
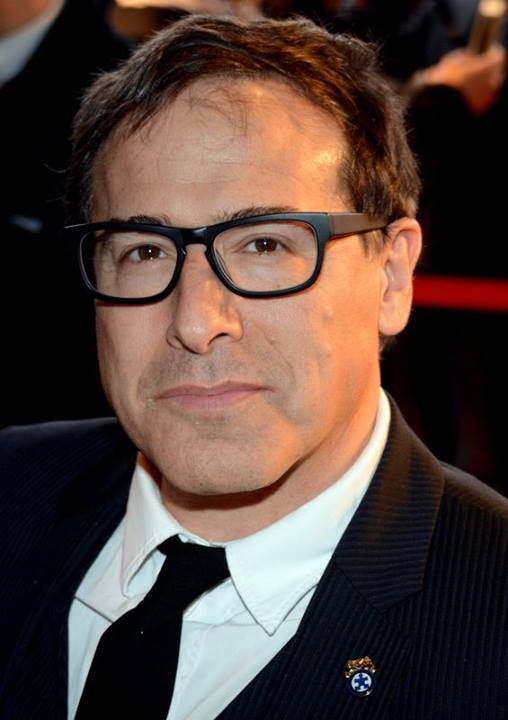
David O. Russell, Best Director winner

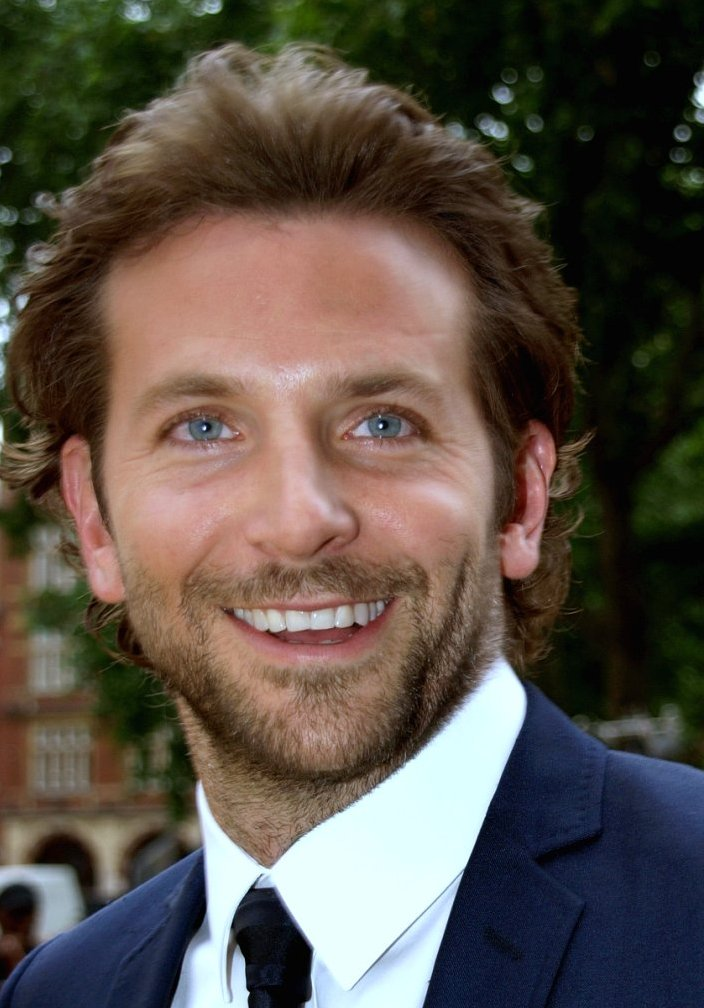
Bradley Cooper, Best Actor in a Motion Picture winner

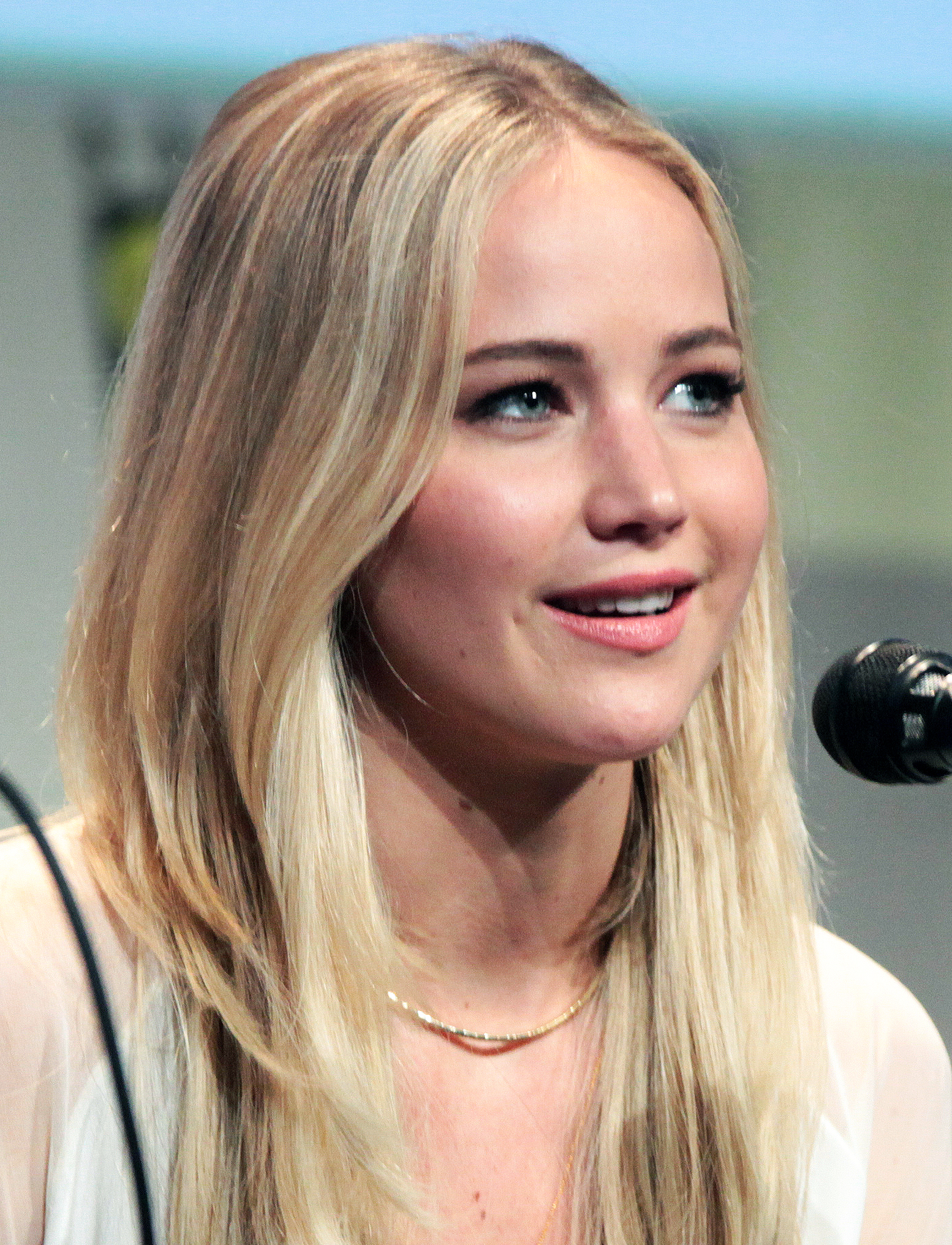
Jennifer Lawrence, Best Actress in a Motion Picture winner

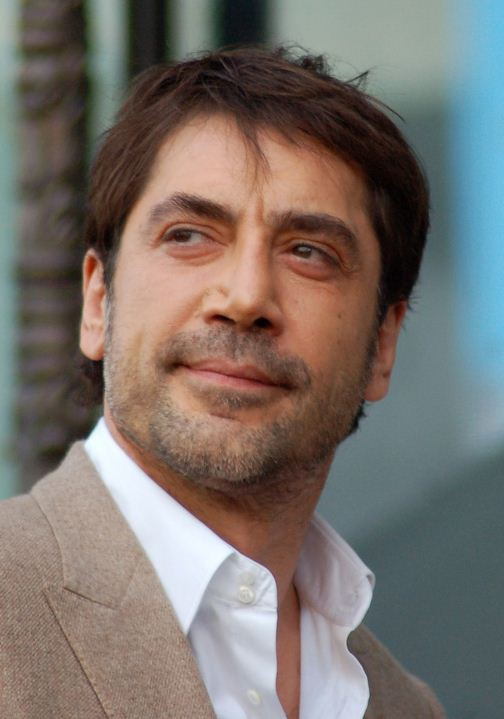
Javier Bardem, Best Supporting Actor in a Motion Picture winner

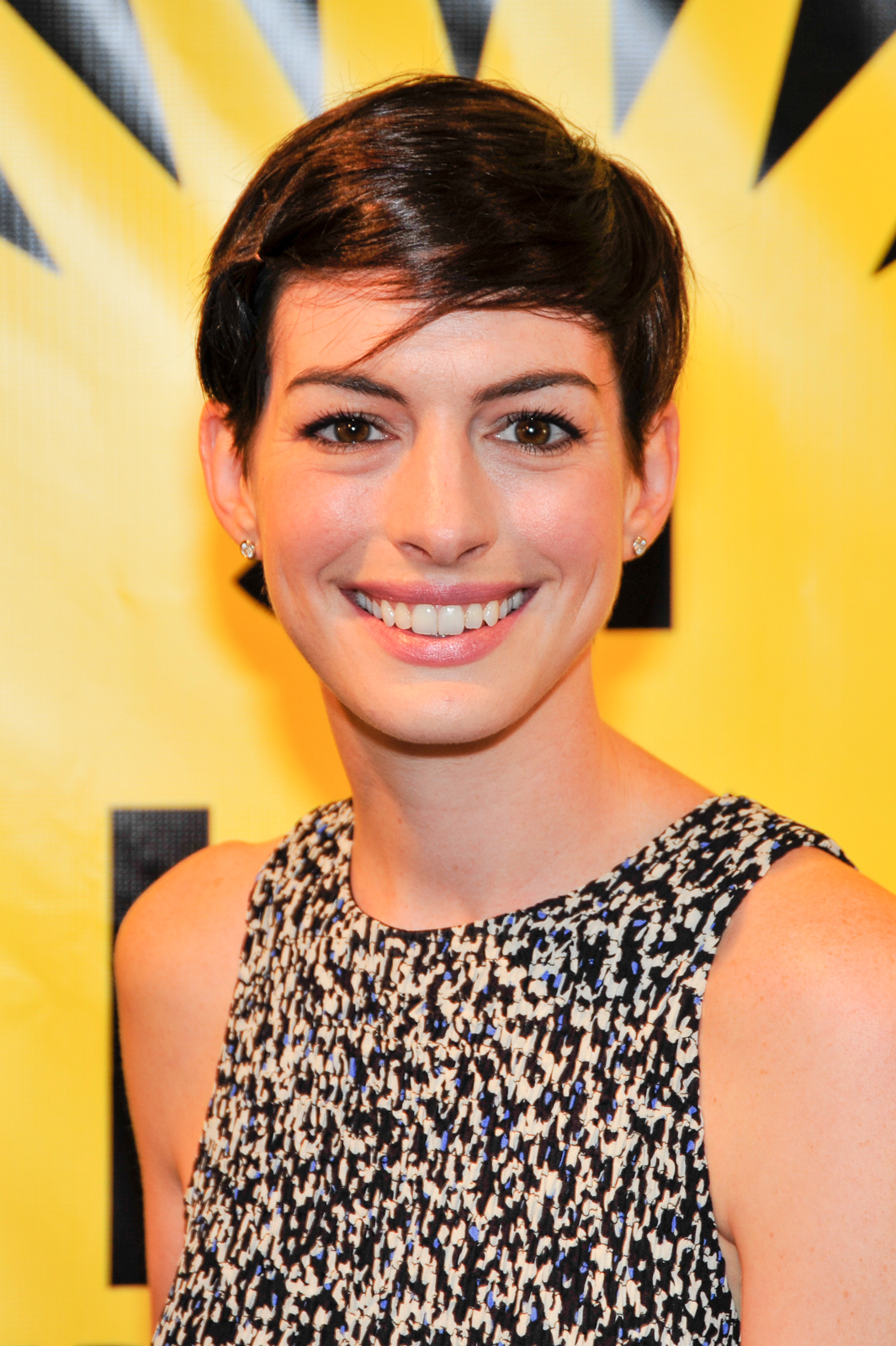
Anne Hathaway, Best Supporting Actress in a Motion Picture winner

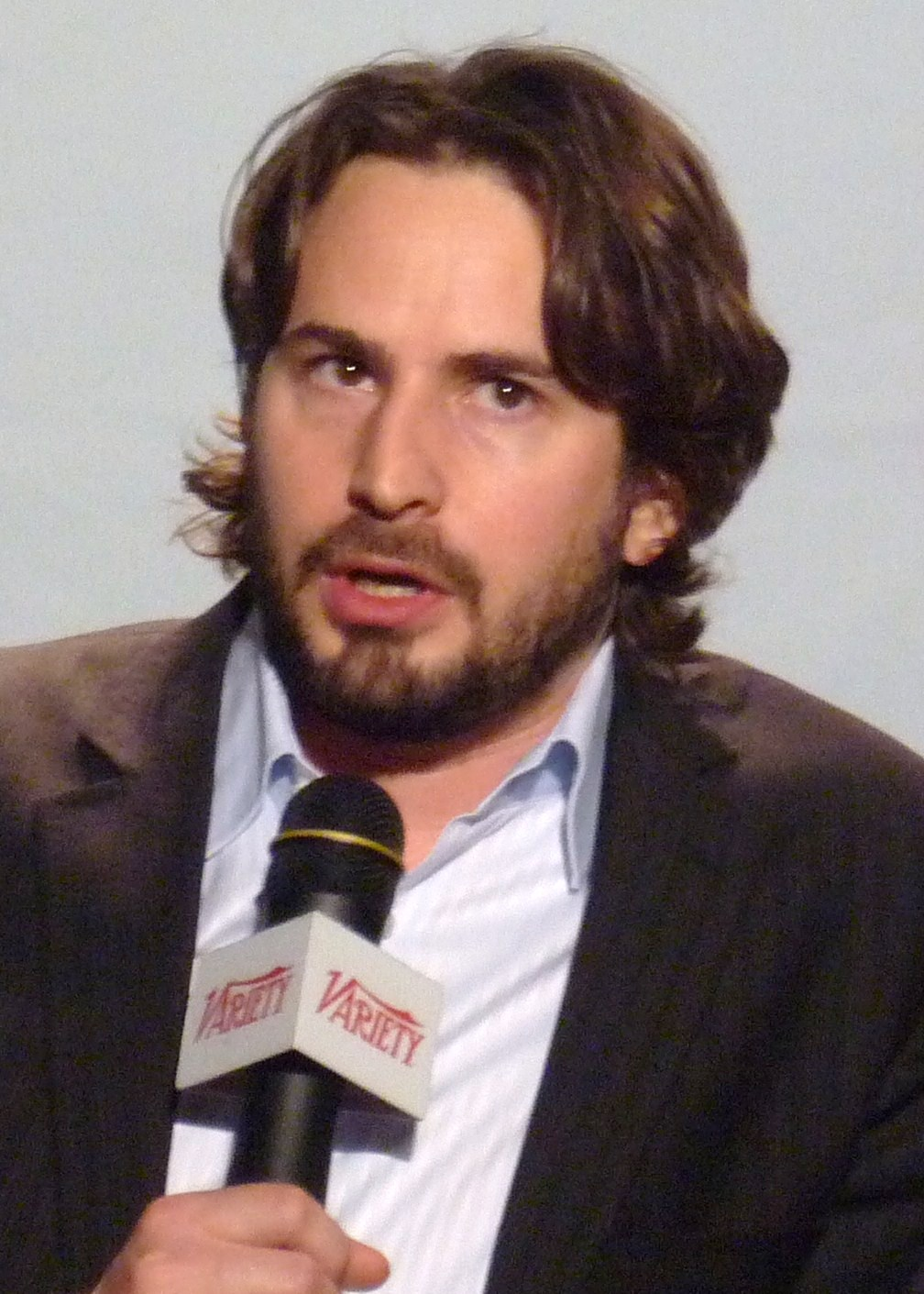
Mark Boal, Best Original Screenplay winner

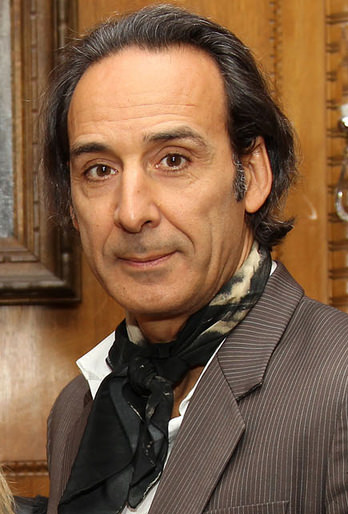
Alexandre Desplat, Best Original Score winner

Winners are listed first and highlighted in bold.

Best Film	Best Director
**Silver Linings Playbook**; Argo; Beasts of the Southern Wild; Les Misérables; Life of Pi; Lincoln; Moonrise Kingdom; The Sessions; Skyfall; Zero Dark Thirty	**David O. Russell – Silver Linings Playbook**; Ben Affleck – Argo; Kathryn Bigelow – Zero Dark Thirty; Kim Ki-duk – Pietà; Ben Lewin – The Sessions; Steven Spielberg – Lincoln
Best Actor	Best Actress
**Bradley Cooper – Silver Linings Playbook as Patrizio "Pat" Solitano Jr.**; Daniel Day-Lewis – Lincoln as President Abraham Lincoln; John Hawkes – The Sessions as Mark O'Brien; Hugh Jackman – Les Misérables as Jean Valjean; Joaquin Phoenix – The Master as Freddie Quell; Omar Sy – The Intouchables as Bakary "Driss" Bassari; Denzel Washington – Flight as Captain Whip Whitaker	**Jennifer Lawrence – Silver Linings Playbook as Tiffany Maxwell**; Laura Birn – Purge as Aliide Truu; Jessica Chastain – Zero Dark Thirty as Maya Harris; Émilie Dequenne – Our Children as Murielle; Keira Knightley – Anna Karenina as Anna Arkadievna Karenina; Laura Linney – Hyde Park on Hudson as Margaret "Daisy" Suckley; Emmanuelle Riva – Amour as Anne Laurent
Best Supporting Actor	Best Supporting Actress
**Javier Bardem – Skyfall as Raoul Silva**; Robert De Niro – Silver Linings Playbook as Patrizio "Pat" Solitano Sr.; John Goodman – Flight as Harling Mays; Philip Seymour Hoffman – The Master as Lancaster Dodd; Tommy Lee Jones – Lincoln as Congressman Thaddeus Stevens; Eddie Redmayne – Les Misérables as Marius Pontmercy	**Anne Hathaway – Les Misérables as Fantine**; Amy Adams – The Master as Peggy Dodd; Samantha Barks – Les Misérables as Éponine; Judi Dench – Skyfall as M; Hélène Florent – Café de Flore as Carole; Helen Hunt – The Sessions as Cheryl Cohen-Greene
Best Original Screenplay	Best Adapted Screenplay
**Zero Dark Thirty – Mark Boal**; Flight – John Gatins; The Intouchables – Éric Toledano and Olivier Nakache; The Master – Paul Thomas Anderson; Moonrise Kingdom – Wes Anderson and Roman Coppola; Pietà – Kim Ki-duk	**Life of Pi – David Magee**; Anna Karenina – Tom Stoppard; Argo – Chris Terrio; Lincoln – Tony Kushner; The Sessions – Ben Lewin; Silver Linings Playbook – David O. Russell
Best Animated or Mixed Media Film	Best Documentary Film
**Rise of the Guardians**; Brave; Frankenweenie; Ice Age: Continental Drift; Madagascar 3: Europe's Most Wanted; ParaNorman; Wreck-It Ralph	**Chasing Ice**; Ai Weiwei: Never Sorry; The Central Park Five; The Gatekeepers; Marina Abramović: The Artist Is Present; The Pruitt-Igoe Myth; Searching for Sugar Man; West of Memphis
Best Foreign Language Film	Best Art Direction and Production Design
**The Intouchables (France) (TIE)**; **Pietà (South Korea) (TIE)**; Amour (Austria); Beyond the Hills (Romania); Caesar Must Die (Italy); Kon-Tiki (Norway); Our Children (Belgium); A Royal Affair (Denmark); War Witch (Canada)	**Lincoln – Curt Beech, Rick Carter, David Crank, and Leslie McDonald**; Anna Karenina; The Dark Knight Rises; Les Misérables; The Master; A Royal Affair
Best Cinematography	Best Costume Design
**Life of Pi – Claudio Miranda**; Anna Karenina – Seamus McGarvey; Beasts of the Southern Wild – Ben Richardson; Lincoln – Janusz Kamiński; The Master – Mihai Mălaimare Jr.; Skyfall – Roger Deakins	**A Royal Affair – Manon Rasmussen**; Anna Karenina; Cloud Atlas; Farewell, My Queen; Les Misérables; Snow White and the Huntsman
Best Original Score	Best Original Song
**Argo – Alexandre Desplat**; Anna Karenina – Dario Marianelli; Beasts of the Southern Wild – Dan Romer and Benh Zeitlin; Lincoln – John Williams; The Master – Jonny Greenwood; Skyfall – Thomas Newman	**"Suddenly" – Les Misérables**; "Fire in the Blood/Snake Song" – Lawless; "Learn Me Right" – Brave; "Love Always Comes As a Surprise" – Madagascar 3: Europe's Most Wanted; "Skyfall" – Skyfall; "Still Alive" – Paul Williams Still Alive
Best Film Editing	Best Sound (Editing and Mixing)
**Silver Linings Playbook – Jay Cassidy and Crispin Struthers**; Cloud Atlas; Flight; Les Misérables; The Sessions; Zero Dark Thirty	**Les Misérables – Simon Hayes, Andy Nelson, Lee Walpole, and John Warhurst**; Flight; Kon-Tiki; Life of Pi; Prometheus; Snow White and the Huntsman
Best Visual Effects	Best Ensemble – Motion Picture
**Flight – Kevin Baillie, Jim Gibbs, Michael Lantieri, and Ryan Tudhope**; Cloud Atlas; The Dark Knight Rises; Life of Pi; Prometheus; Skyfall	**Les Miserábles – Samantha Barks, Sacha Baron Cohen, Helena Bonham Carter,** **Russell Crowe, Anne Hathaway, Hugh Jackman, Eddie Redmayne, and Amanda Seyfried**

== Television winners and nominees ==
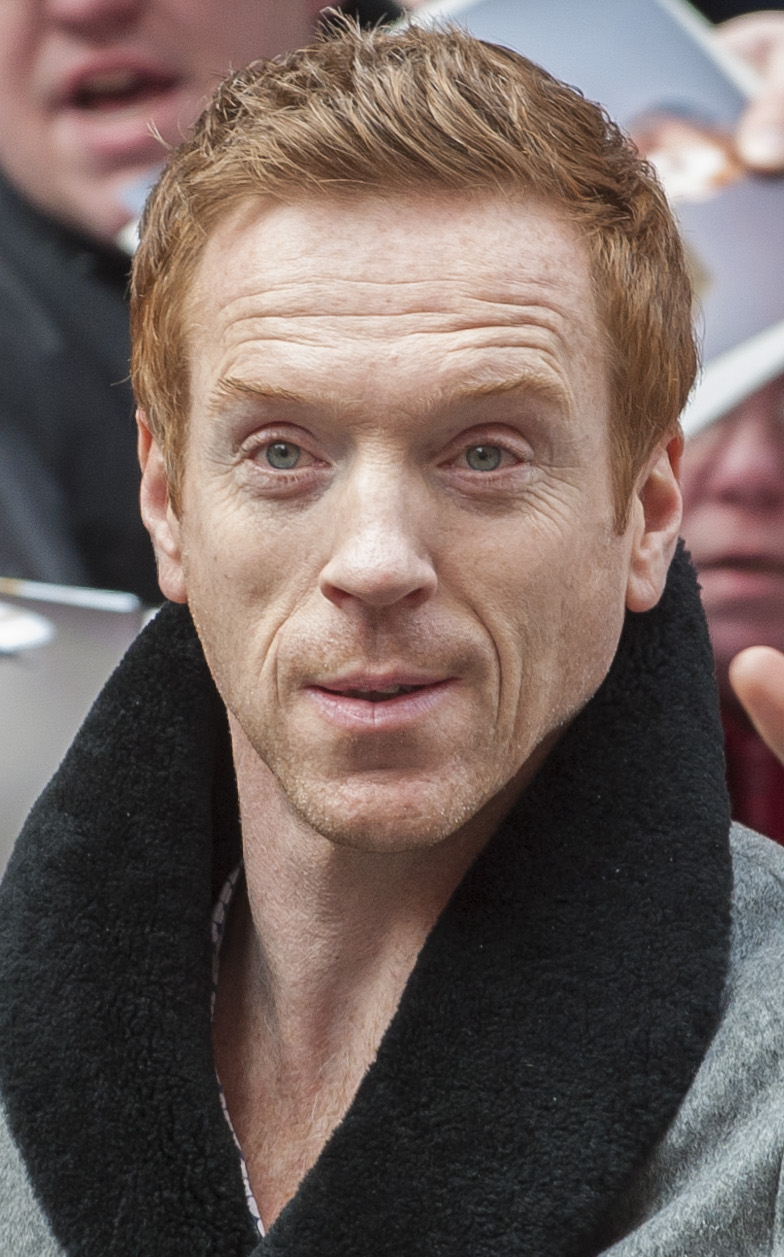
Damian Lewis, Best Actor in a Drama Series winner

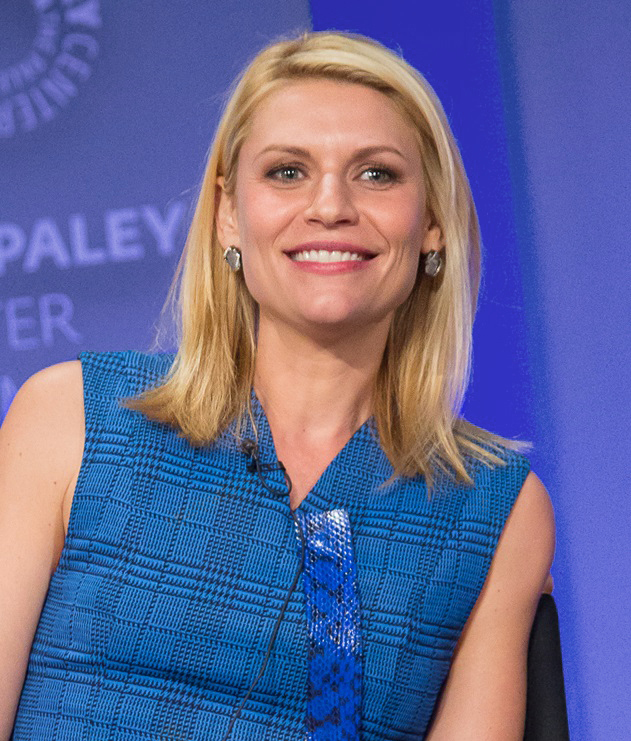
Claire Danes, Best Actress in a Drama Series winner

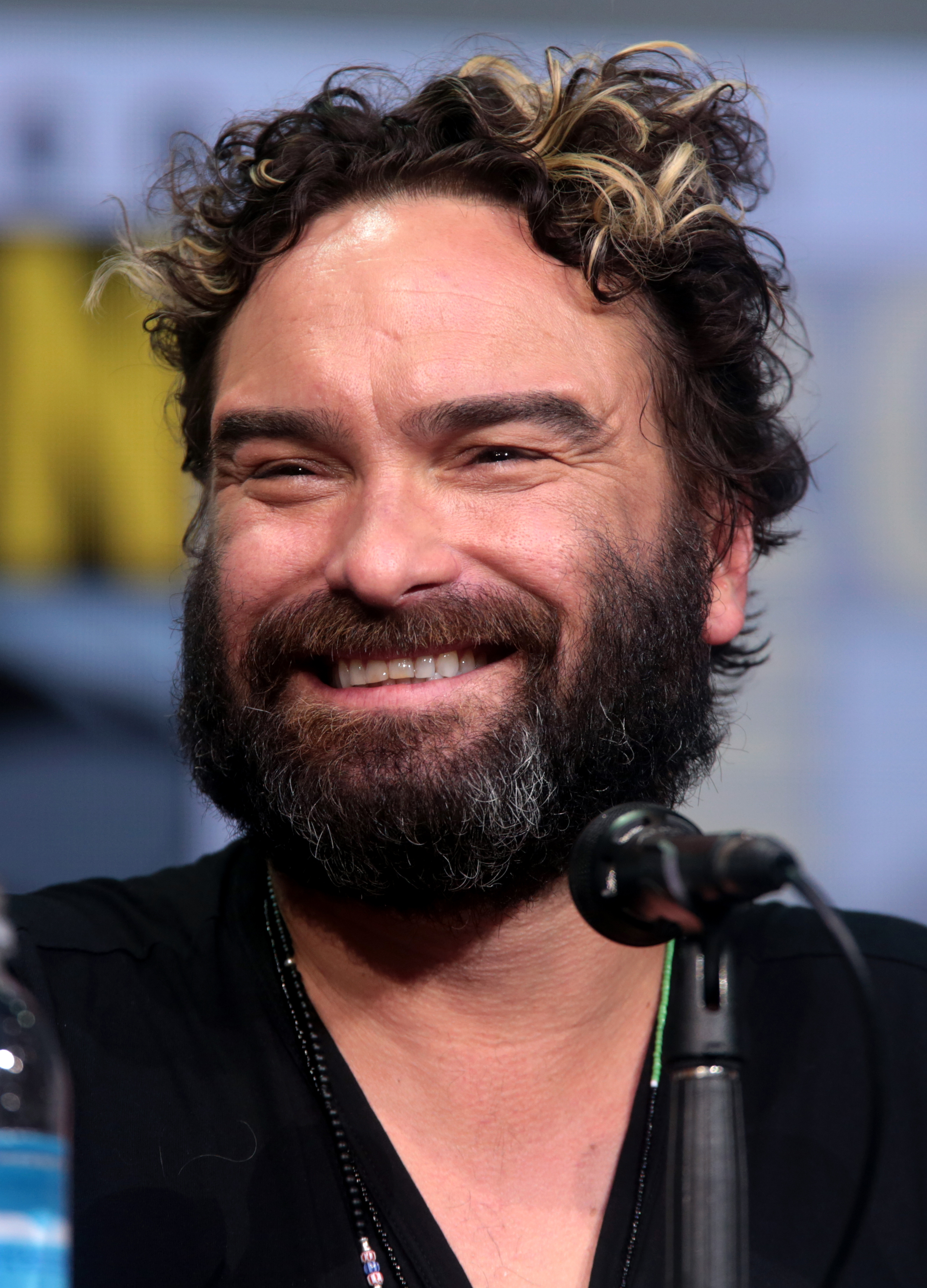
Johnny Galecki, Best Actor in a Comedy or Musical Series winner

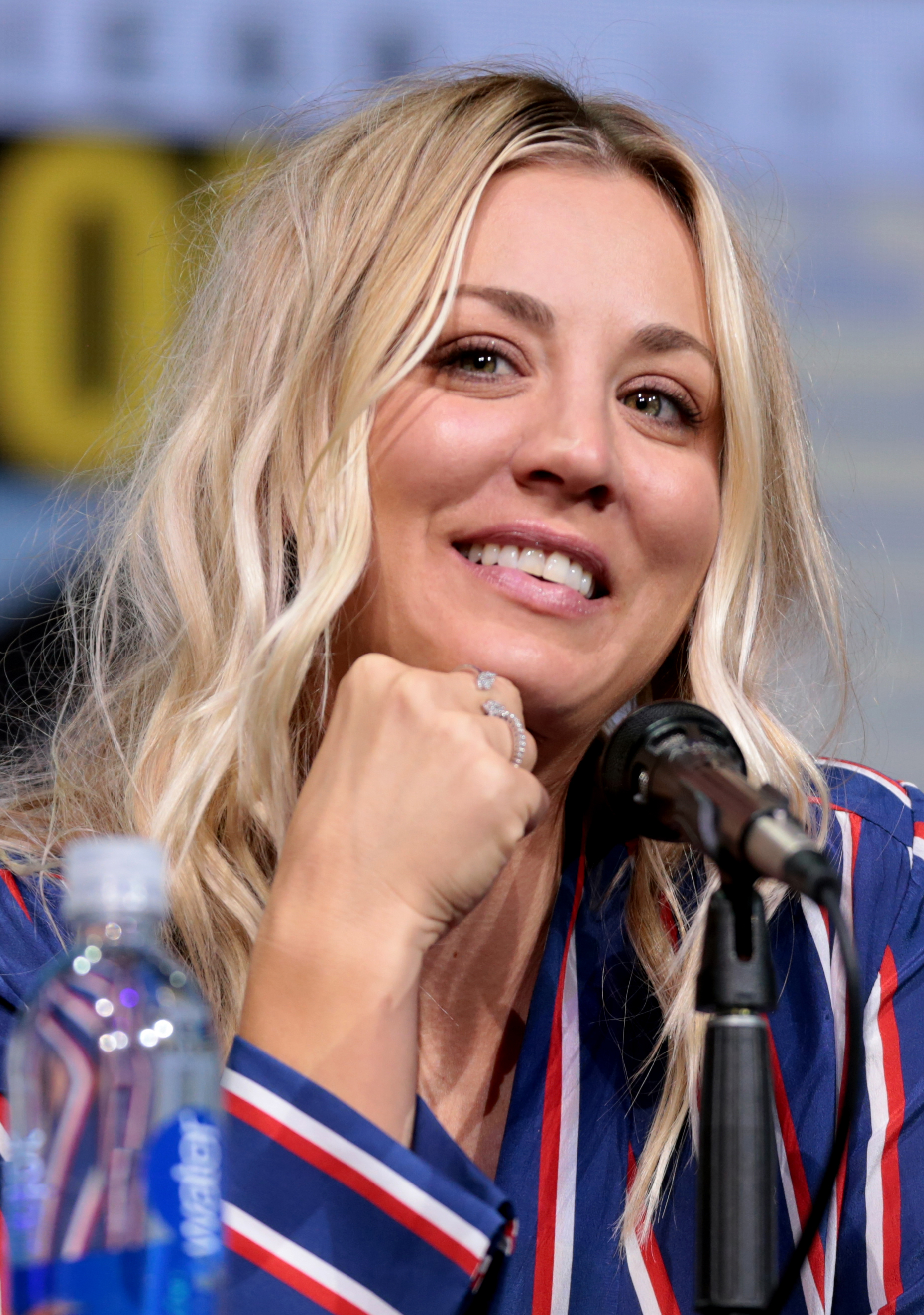
Kaley Cuoco, Best Actress in a Comedy or Musical Series winner

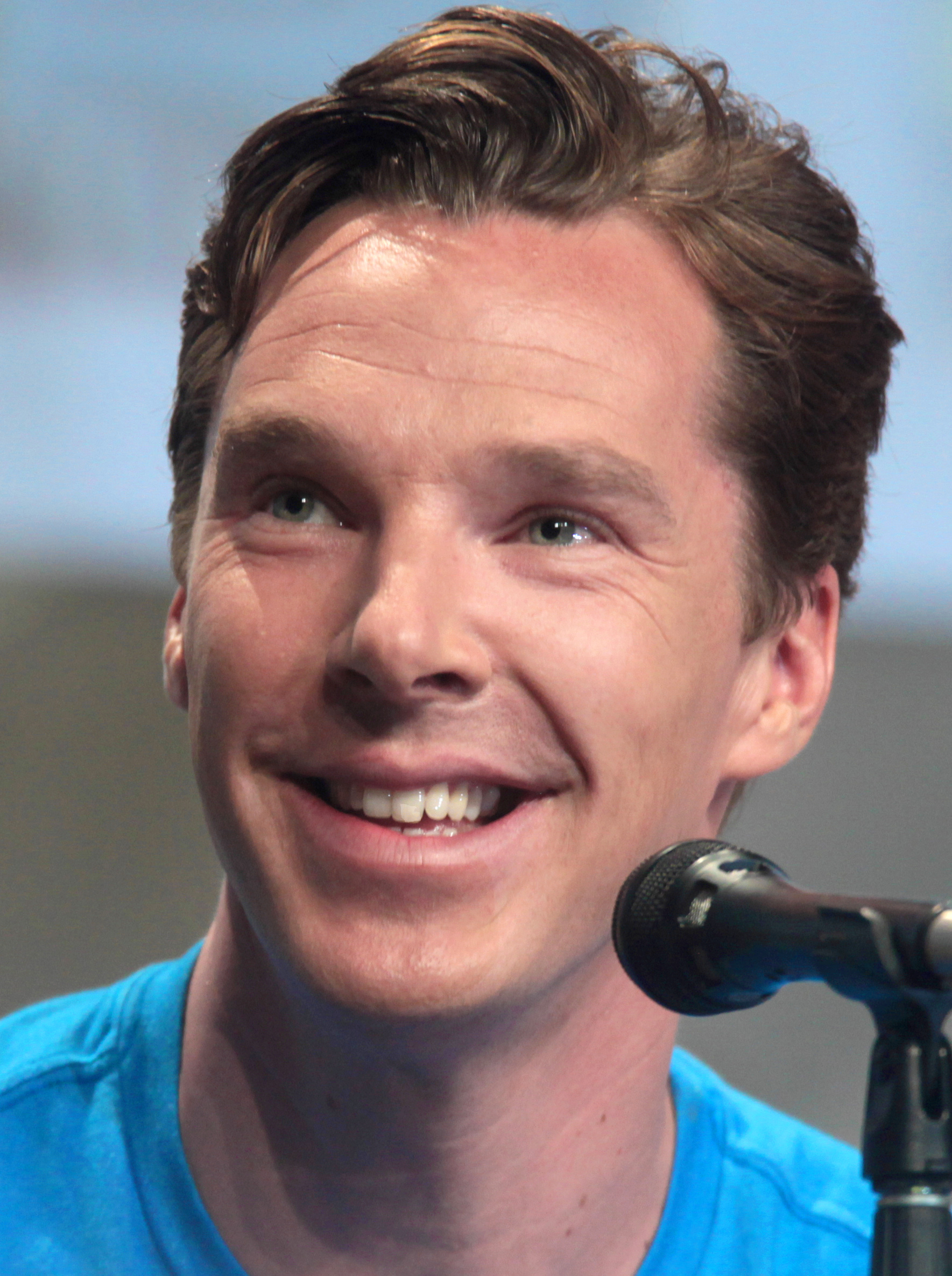
Benedict Cumberbatch, Best Actor in a Miniseries or Television Film winner

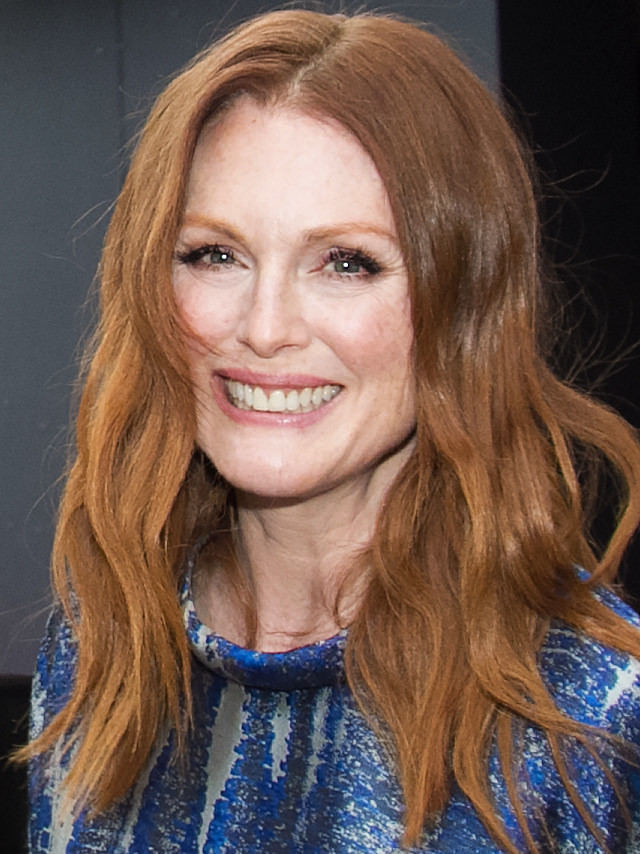
Julianne Moore, Best Actress in a Miniseries or Television Film winner

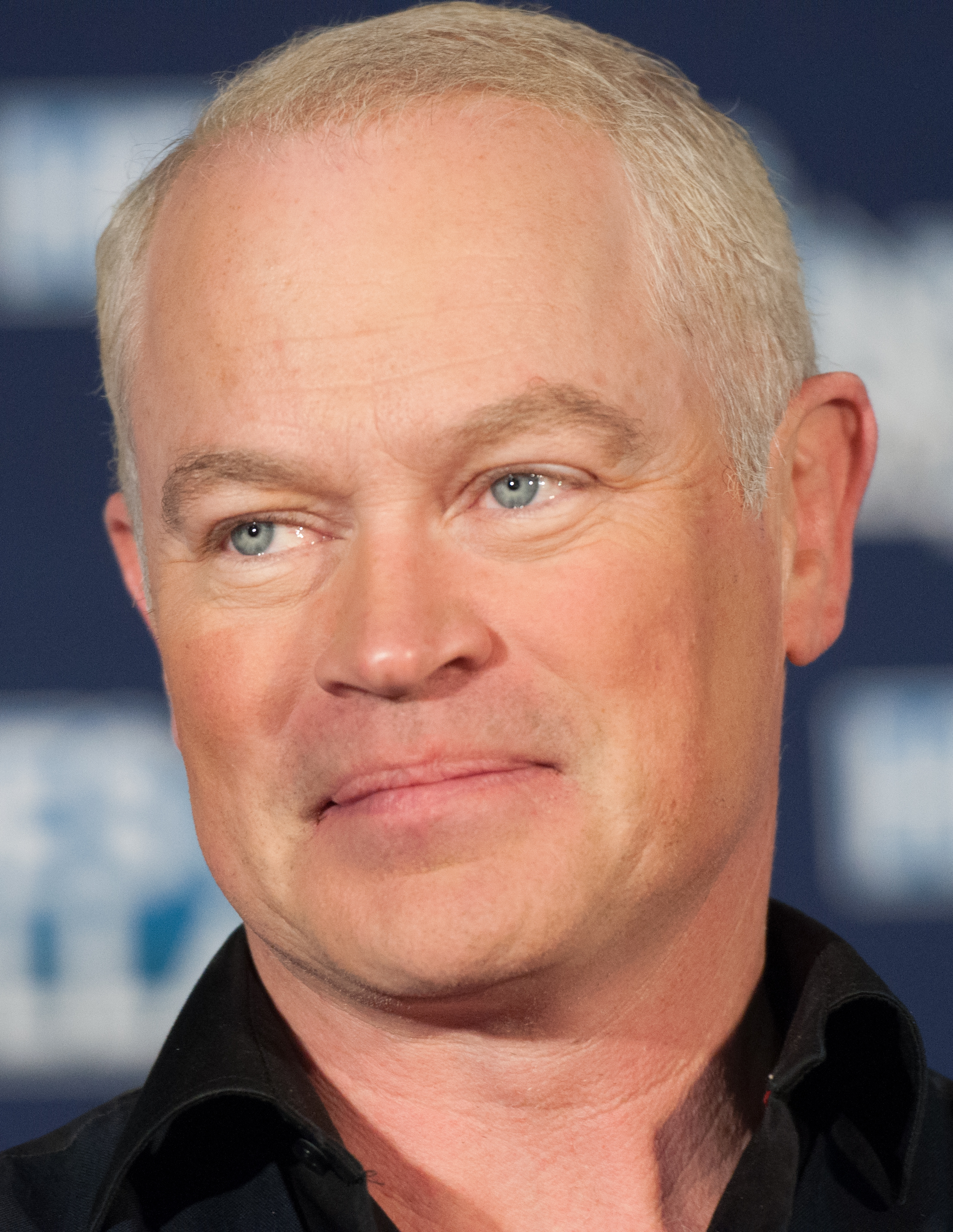
Neal McDonough, Best Supporting Actor in a Series, Miniseries, or Television Film winner

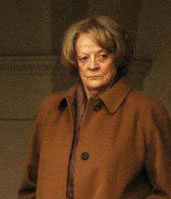
Maggie Smith, Best Supporting Actress in a Series, Miniseries, or Television Film winner

Winners are listed first and highlighted in bold.

Best Drama Series	Best Comedy or Musical Series
**Homeland – Showtime**; Breaking Bad – AMC; Downton Abbey – PBS; Game of Thrones – HBO; The Good Wife – CBS; Justified – FX; The Newsroom – HBO; Nashville – ABC	**The Big Bang Theory – CBS**; Community – NBC; Girls – HBO; Happy Endings – ABC; Modern Family – ABC; The Office – NBC; Parks and Recreation – NBC; Up All Night – NBC
Best Miniseries or Television Film	Best Genre Series
**Hatfields & McCoys – History**; Birdsong – PBS; The Crimson Petal and the White – BBC America; Game Change – HBO; Hemingway & Gellhorn – HBO; Luther – BBC America; Sherlock – PBS; Wallander – PBS	**The Walking Dead – AMC**; American Horror Story: Asylum – FX; Arrow – The CW; Fringe – Fox; Grimm – NBC; Once Upon a Time – ABC; Revolution – NBC; Supernatural – The CW
Best Actor in a Drama Series	Best Actress in a Drama Series
**Damian Lewis – Homeland as Nicholas Brody**; Bryan Cranston – Breaking Bad as Walter White; Jeff Daniels – The Newsroom as Will McAvoy; Jon Hamm – Mad Men as Don Draper; Jonny Lee Miller – Elementary as Sherlock Holmes; Timothy Olyphant – Justified as Raylan Givens	**Claire Danes – Homeland as Carrie Mathison**; Connie Britton – Nashville as Rayna Jaymes; Michelle Dockery – Downton Abbey as Lady Mary Crawley; Julianna Margulies – The Good Wife as Alicia Florrick; Hayden Panettiere – Nashville as Juliette Barnes; Chloë Sevigny – Hit & Miss as Mia
Best Actor in a Comedy or Musical Series	Best Actress in a Comedy or Musical Series
**Johnny Galecki – The Big Bang Theory as Dr. Leonard Hofstadter**; Will Arnett – Up All Night as Chris Brinkley; Don Cheadle – House of Lies as Marty Kaan; Louis C.K. – Louie as Louie; Joel McHale – Community as Jeff Winger; Jim Parsons – The Big Bang Theory as Dr. Sheldon Cooper	**Kaley Cuoco – The Big Bang Theory as Penny**; Christina Applegate – Up All Night as Reagan Brinkley; Laura Dern – Enlightened as Amy Jellicoe; Lena Dunham – Girls as Hannah Horvath; Julia Louis-Dreyfus – Veep as Vice President Selina Meyer; Amy Poehler – Parks and Recreation as Leslie Knope
Best Actor in a Miniseries or Television Film	Best Actress in a Miniseries or Television Film
**Benedict Cumberbatch – Sherlock as Sherlock Holmes**; Kenneth Branagh – Wallander as Kurt Wallander; Kevin Costner – Hatfields & McCoys as Devil Anse Hatfield; Idris Elba – Luther as John Luther; Woody Harrelson – Game Change as Steve Schmidt; Clive Owen – Hemingway & Gellhorn as Ernest Hemingway	**Julianne Moore – Game Change as Sarah Palin**; Gillian Anderson – Great Expectations as Miss Havisham; Romola Garai – The Crimson Petal and the White as Sugar; Nicole Kidman – Hemingway & Gellhorn as Martha Gellhorn; Sienna Miller – The Girl as Tippi Hedren; Sigourney Weaver – Political Animals as Elaine Barrish
Best Supporting Actor in a Series, Miniseries, or Television Film	Best Supporting Actress in a Series, Miniseries, or Television Film
**Neal McDonough – Justified as Robert Quarles**; Powers Boothe – Nashville as Lamar Wyatt; Jim Carter – Downton Abbey as Charles Carson; Peter Dinklage – Game of Thrones as Tyrion Lannister; Giancarlo Esposito – Breaking Bad as Gus Fring; Evan Peters – American Horror Story: Asylum as Kit Walker	**Maggie Smith – Downton Abbey as Violet Crawley, Dowager Countess of Grantham**; Mayim Bialik – The Big Bang Theory as Dr. Amy Farrah Fowler; Christina Hendricks – Mad Men as Joan Harris; Sarah Paulson – Game Change as Nicolle Wallace; Maya Rudolph – Up All Night as Ava Alexander; Mare Winningham – Hatfields & McCoys as Sally McCoy
Best Ensemble – Television
**The Walking Dead (AMC) – Sarah Wayne Callies, Lauren Cohan, Danai Gurira, Laurie Holden, Andrew Lincoln, Melissa McBride, David Morrissey, Norman Reedus, Chandler Riggs, Michael Rooker, Scott Wilson, and Steven Yeun**

== New Media winners and nominees ==
Best Action / Adventure Game	Best Mobile Game
Dishonored (Arkane Studios); Assassin's Creed III (Ubisoft); Binary Domain (Yakuza Studio); Minecraft: Xbox 360 Edition (4J Studios / Mojang Studios); The Walking Dead (Episode: "No Time Left") (Telltale Games)	Super Monsters Ate My Condo (Adult Swim Digital); Amazing Alex (Rovio Entertainment); Horn (Phosphor Games); Huebrix (Yellow Monkey Studios); Wildblood (Gameloft)
Best Role Playing Game	Best Sports / Racing Game
Mass Effect 3 (BioWare); Dark Souls (FromSoftware); Diablo III (Blizzard Entertainment); The Elder Scrolls V: Dawnguard (Bethesda Game Studios); Kingdoms of Amalur: Reckoning (38 Studios)	Forza Horizon (Playground Games); FIFA 13 (EA Sports); LittleBigPlanet Karting (United Front Games); Madden NFL 13 (EA Tiburon); Pro Evolution Soccer 2013 (Konami)

== Awards breakdown ==
=== Film ===
Winners:

5 / 7 Silver Linings Playbook: Best Actor / Best Actress / Best Director / Best Film / Best Film Editing
4 / 11 Les Miserábles: Best Ensemble – Motion Picture / Best Original Song / Best Sound (Editing and Mixing) / Best Supporting Actress
2 / 5 Life of Pi: Best Adapted Screenplay / Best Cinematography
1 / 1 Chasing Ice: Best Documentary Film
1 / 1 Rise of the Guardians: Best Animated or Mixed Media Film
1 / 3 The Intouchables: Best Foreign Language Film
1 / 3 Pietà: Best Foreign Language Film
1 / 3 A Royal Affair: Best Costume Design
1 / 4 Argo: Best Original Score
1 / 5 Zero Dark Thirty: Best Original Screenplay
1 / 6 Flight: Best Visual Effects
1 / 7 Skyfall: Best Supporting Actor
1 / 8 Lincoln: Best Art Direction and Production Design

Losers:

0 / 7 The Master
0 / 6 Anna Karenina, The Sessions
0 / 3 Beasts of the Southern Wild, Cloud Atlas
0 / 2 Amour, Brave, The Dark Knight Rises, Kon-Tiki, Madagascar 3: Europe's Most Wanted, Moonrise Kingdom, Our Children, Prometheus, Snow White and the Huntsman

=== Television ===
Winners:

3 / 3 Homeland: Best Actor & Actress in a Drama Series / Best Drama Series
3 / 5 The Big Bang Theory: Best Actor & Actress in a Comedy or Musical Series / Best Comedy or Musical Series
2 / 2 The Walking Dead: Best Ensemble – Television / Best Genre Series
1 / 2 Sherlock: Best Actor in a Miniseries or Television Film
1 / 3 Hatfields & McCoys: Best Miniseries or Television Film
1 / 3 Justified: Best Supporting Actor in a Series, Miniseries or Television Film
1 / 4 Downton Abbey: Best Supporting Actress in a Series, Miniseries or Television Film
1 / 4 Game Change: Best Actress in a Miniseries or Television Film

Losers:

0 / 4 Nashville, Up All Night
0 / 3 Breaking Bad, Hemingway & Gellhorn
0 / 2 American Horror Story: Asylum, Community, The Crimson Petal and the White, Game of Thrones, Girls, The Good Wife, Luther, Mad Men, The Newsroom, Parks and Recreation, Wallander
