= Humanitarian Satellite Award =

Annual film award

The Humanitarian Award is a specially designated Satellite Award for special achievement via community involvement and work on social causes. Unlike the Satellite Award statuettes, which are decided by the voting membership, honorees are selected each year by the IPA President and Board Members.

The award is for those in the entertainment industry who have truly made a difference in the lives of those in the artistic community and beyond.

== Honorees ==
- 2010: Connie Stevens
- 2011: Tim Hetherington
- 2012: Benh Zeitlin
- 2013: - none -
- 2014: Sebastian Junger
- 2015: Spike Lee
- 2016: Patrick Stewart
- 2017: Stephen Chbosky
- 2018: - none -
- 2019: Mounia Meddour
- 2020: Mark Wahlberg
- 2021: Val Kilmer
- 2022: Joe Mantegna
- 2023: Dennis Quaid
- 2024: Alejandro Gómez Monteverde
- 2025: Gary Sinise
