= Satellite Award for Best Director =

Annual International Press Academy award

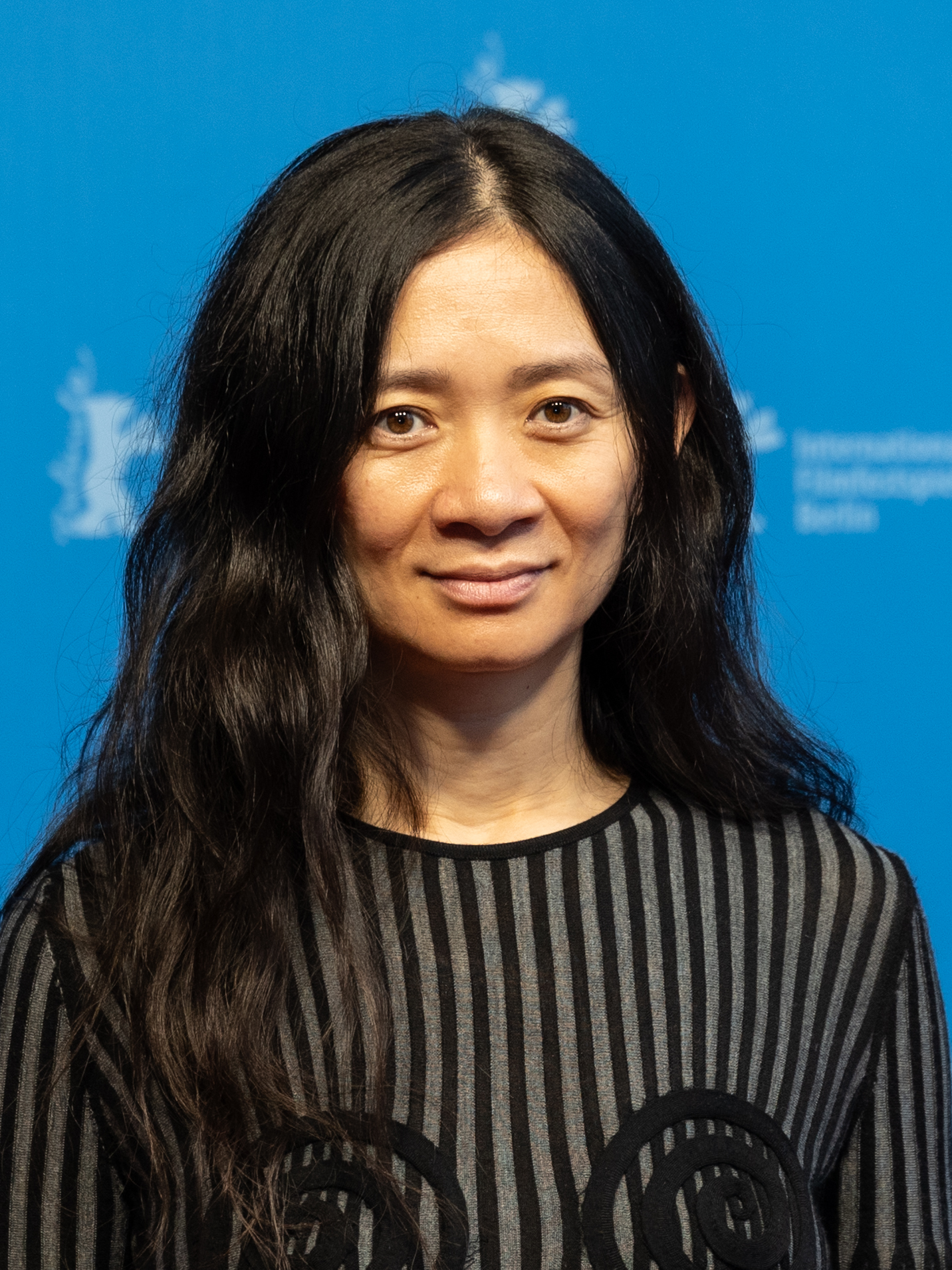
- The 2025 recipient: Chloé Zhao
- Awarded for: Best Directing
- Country: United States
- Presented by: International Press Academy
- First award: 1996 (first awarded to Joel Coen for Fargo)
- Currently held by: Chloé Zhao – Hamnet (2025)
- Website: http://www.pressacademy.com/

The Satellite Award for Best Director is one of the annual Satellite Awards given by the International Press Academy.

== Winners and nominees ==
=== 1990s ===
Year	Director(s)	Film
1996	Joel Coen	Fargo
1996	Scott Hicks	Shine
1996	Mike Leigh	Secrets & Lies
1996	Anthony Minghella	The English Patient
1996	Lars von Trier	Breaking the Waves
1997	James Cameron	Titanic
1997	Paul Thomas Anderson	Boogie Nights
1997	Curtis Hanson	L.A. Confidential
1997	Steven Spielberg	Amistad
1997	Gus Van Sant	Good Will Hunting
1998	Terrence Malick	The Thin Red Line
1998	John Boorman	The General
1998	Shekhar Kapur	Elizabeth
1998	Gary Ross	Pleasantville
1998	Steven Spielberg	Saving Private Ryan
1999	Michael Mann	The Insider
1999	Paul Thomas Anderson	Magnolia
1999	Sam Mendes	American Beauty
1999	Anthony Minghella	The Talented Mr. Ripley
1999	Kimberly Peirce	Boys Don't Cry

=== 2000s ===
Year	Director(s)	Film
2000	Steven Soderbergh	Traffic
2000	Cameron Crowe	Almost Famous
2000	Philip Kaufman	Quills
2000	Ang Lee	Crouching Tiger, Hidden Dragon (Wo hu cang long)
2000	Ridley Scott	Gladiator
2000	Steven Soderbergh	Erin Brockovich
2001	Baz Luhrmann	Moulin Rouge!
2001	Jonathan Glazer	Sexy Beast
2001	Scott McGehee and David Siegel	The Deep End
2001	John Cameron Mitchell	Hedwig and the Angry Inch
2001	Christopher Nolan	Memento
2002	Todd Haynes	Far from Heaven
2002	Stephen Daldry	The Hours
2002	Peter Jackson	The Lord of the Rings: The Two Towers
2002	Phillip Noyce	The Quiet American
2002	Denzel Washington	Antwone Fisher
2003	Jim Sheridan	In America
2003	Shari Springer Berman and Robert Pulcini	American Splendor
2003	Niki Caro	Whale Rider
2003	Sofia Coppola	Lost in Translation
2003	Clint Eastwood	Mystic River
2003	Catherine Hardwicke	Thirteen
2004	Mel Gibson	The Passion of the Christ
2004	Taylor Hackford	Ray
2004	Joshua Marston	Maria Full of Grace (María llena eres de gracia)
2004	Alexander Payne	Sideways
2004	Martin Scorsese	The Aviator
2005	Ang Lee	Brokeback Mountain
2005	George Clooney	Good Night, and Good Luck
2005	James Mangold	Walk the Line
2005	Rob Marshall	Memoirs of a Geisha
2005	Bennett Miller	Capote
2006	Bill Condon	Dreamgirls
2006	Clint Eastwood	Flags of Our Fathers
2006	Pedro Almodóvar	Volver
2006	Stephen Frears	The Queen
2006	Alejandro González Iñárritu	Babel
2006	Martin Scorsese	The Departed
2007	Joel Coen and Ethan Coen	No Country for Old Men
2007	David Cronenberg	Eastern Promises
2007	Olivier Dahan	La Vie en Rose
2007	Ang Lee	Lust, Caution
2007	Sidney Lumet	Before the Devil Knows You're Dead
2007	Sarah Polley	Away from Her
2008	Danny Boyle	Slumdog Millionaire
2008	Stephen Daldry	The Reader
2008	Ron Howard	Frost/Nixon
2008	Tom McCarthy	The Visitor
2008	Christopher Nolan	The Dark Knight
2008	Gus Van Sant	Milk
2009	Kathryn Bigelow	The Hurt Locker
2009	Neill Blomkamp	District 9
2009	Jane Campion	Bright Star
2009	Lee Daniels	Precious
2009	Rob Marshall	Nine
2009	Lone Scherfig	An Education

=== 2010s ===
Year	Director(s)	Film
2010	David Fincher	The Social Network
2010	Ben Affleck	The Town
2010	Darren Aronofsky	Black Swan
2010	Danny Boyle	127 Hours
2010	Lisa Cholodenko	The Kids Are All Right
2010	Debra Granik	Winter's Bone
2010	Tom Hooper	The King's Speech
2010	David Michôd	Animal Kingdom
2010	Christopher Nolan	Inception
2010	Roman Polanski	The Ghost Writer
2011	Nicolas Winding Refn	Drive
2011	Woody Allen	Midnight in Paris
2011	Tomas Alfredson	Tinker Tailor Soldier Spy
2011	Michel Hazanavicius	The Artist
2011	John Michael McDonagh	The Guard
2011	Steve McQueen	Shame
2011	Alexander Payne	The Descendants
2011	Martin Scorsese	Hugo
2011	Steven Spielberg	War Horse
2011	Tate Taylor	The Help
2012	David O. Russell	Silver Linings Playbook
2012	Ben Affleck	Argo
2012	Kathryn Bigelow	Zero Dark Thirty
2012	Kim Ki-duk	Pietà
2012	Ben Lewin	The Sessions
2012	Steven Spielberg	Lincoln
2013	Steve McQueen	12 Years a Slave
2013	Woody Allen	Blue Jasmine
2013	Joel Coen and Ethan Coen	Inside Llewyn Davis
2013	Alfonso Cuarón	Gravity
2013	Paul Greengrass	Captain Phillips
2013	Ron Howard	Rush
2013	David O. Russell	American Hustle
2013	Martin Scorsese	The Wolf of Wall Street
2014	Richard Linklater	Boyhood
2014	Damien Chazelle	Whiplash
2014	Ava DuVernay	Selma
2014	David Fincher	Gone Girl
2014	Alejandro G. Iñárritu	Birdman
2014	Morten Tyldum	The Imitation Game
2015	Tom McCarthy	Spotlight
2015	Lenny Abrahamson	Room
2015	Tom Hooper	The Danish Girl
2015	Alejandro G. Iñárritu	The Revenant
2015	Ridley Scott	The Martian
2015	Steven Spielberg	Bridge of Spies
2016	Kenneth Lonergan	Manchester by the Sea
2016	Damien Chazelle	La La Land
2016	Tom Ford	Nocturnal Animals
2016	Mel Gibson	Hacksaw Ridge
2016	Barry Jenkins	Moonlight
2016	Pablo Larraín	Jackie
2016	Denzel Washington	Fences
2017	Jordan Peele	Get Out
2017	Sean Baker	The Florida Project
2017	Guillermo del Toro	The Shape of Water
2017	Greta Gerwig	Lady Bird
2017	Christopher Nolan	Dunkirk
2017	Dee Rees	Mudbound
2018	Alfonso Cuarón	Roma
2018	Bradley Cooper	A Star Is Born
2018	Peter Farrelly	Green Book
2018	Barry Jenkins	If Beale Street Could Talk
2018	Yorgos Lanthimos	The Favourite
2018	Spike Lee	BlacKkKlansman
2019	James Mangold	Ford v Ferrari
2019	Pedro Almodóvar	Pain and Glory
2019	Noah Baumbach	Marriage Story
2019	Bong Joon-ho	Parasite
2019	Sam Mendes	1917
2019	Quentin Tarantino	Once Upon a Time in Hollywood

=== 2020s ===
Year	Director(s)	Film
2020	Chloé Zhao	Nomadland
2020	Lee Isaac Chung	Minari
2020	David Fincher	Mank
2020	Darius Marder	Sound of Metal
2020	Aaron Sorkin	The Trial of the Chicago 7
2020	Florian Zeller	The Father
2021	Jane Campion	The Power of the Dog
2021	Paul Thomas Anderson	Licorice Pizza
2021	Kenneth Branagh	Belfast
2021	Reinaldo Marcus Green	King Richard
2021	Lin-Manuel Miranda	tick, tick...BOOM!
2021	Denis Villeneuve	Dune
2022	James Cameron	Avatar: The Way of Water
2022	Joseph Kosinski	Top Gun: Maverick
2022	Baz Luhrmann	Elvis
2022	Martin McDonagh	The Banshees of Inisherin
2022	Sarah Polley	Women Talking
2022	Steven Spielberg	The Fabelmans
2023	Christopher Nolan	Oppenheimer
2023	Greta Gerwig	Barbie
2023	Jonathan Glazer	The Zone of Interest
2023	Yorgos Lanthimos	Poor Things
2023	Alexander Payne	The Holdovers
2023	Martin Scorsese	Killers of the Flower Moon
2024	Brady Corbet	The Brutalist
2024	Sean Baker	Anora
2024	Edward Berger	Conclave
2024	Greg Kwedar	Sing Sing
2024	RaMell Ross	Nickel Boys
2024	Denis Villeneuve	Dune: Part Two
2025	Chloé Zhao	Hamnet
2025	Paul Thomas Anderson	One Battle After Another
2025	James Cameron	Avatar: Fire and Ash
2025	Ryan Coogler	Sinners
2025	Guillermo del Toro	Frankenstein
2025	Jafar Panahi	It Was Just an Accident
2025	Joachim Trier	Sentimental Value

== Multiple winners ==
Only 3 directors have won the award multiple times.

Wins	Director
2	(United States) Joel Coen
2	(Canada) James Cameron
2	(China) Chloé Zhao
