= 16th Satellite Awards =

US awards ceremony for film and television

- Date: December 18, 2011

Highlights
- Best film: The Descendants
- Best television drama: Justified
- Best television musical/comedy: It's Always Sunny in Philadelphia
- Best director: Nicolas Winding Refn for Drive

The 16th Satellite Awards is an award ceremony honoring the year's outstanding performers, films, television shows, home videos and interactive media, presented by the International Press Academy at the Hyatt Regency Century Plaza in Century City, Los Angeles.

The nominations were announced on December 1, 2011. The winners were announced on December 18, 2011.

The categories for motion picture were pared down from 22 to 19 classifications; the change reflected the merger of comedy and drama under a general Best Picture heading.

== Special achievement awards ==
- Auteur Award (for his body of film work, as well as his books on the inner workings of filmmaking and filmmakers) – Peter Bogdanovich
- Humanitarian Award (for community involvement and work on social causes) – Tim Hetherington
- Mary Pickford Award (for outstanding contribution to the entertainment industry) – Mitzi Gaynor
- Nikola Tesla Award (for his work as film preservationist and historian) – Douglas Trumbull
- Best First Feature – Paddy Considine (Tyrannosaur)
- Best Educational Motion Picture – The First Grader (Sam Feuer, Richard Harding, and David Thompson)
- Career of Outstanding Service in the Entertainment Industry – Brian Edwards
- Outstanding Performance in a TV Series – Jessica Lange (American Horror Story)

== Motion picture winners and nominees ==
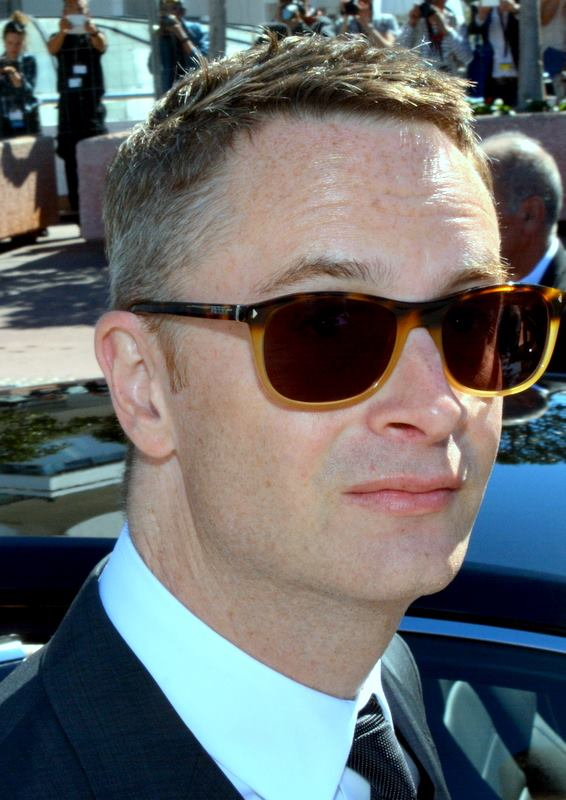
Nicolas Winding Refn, Best Director winner

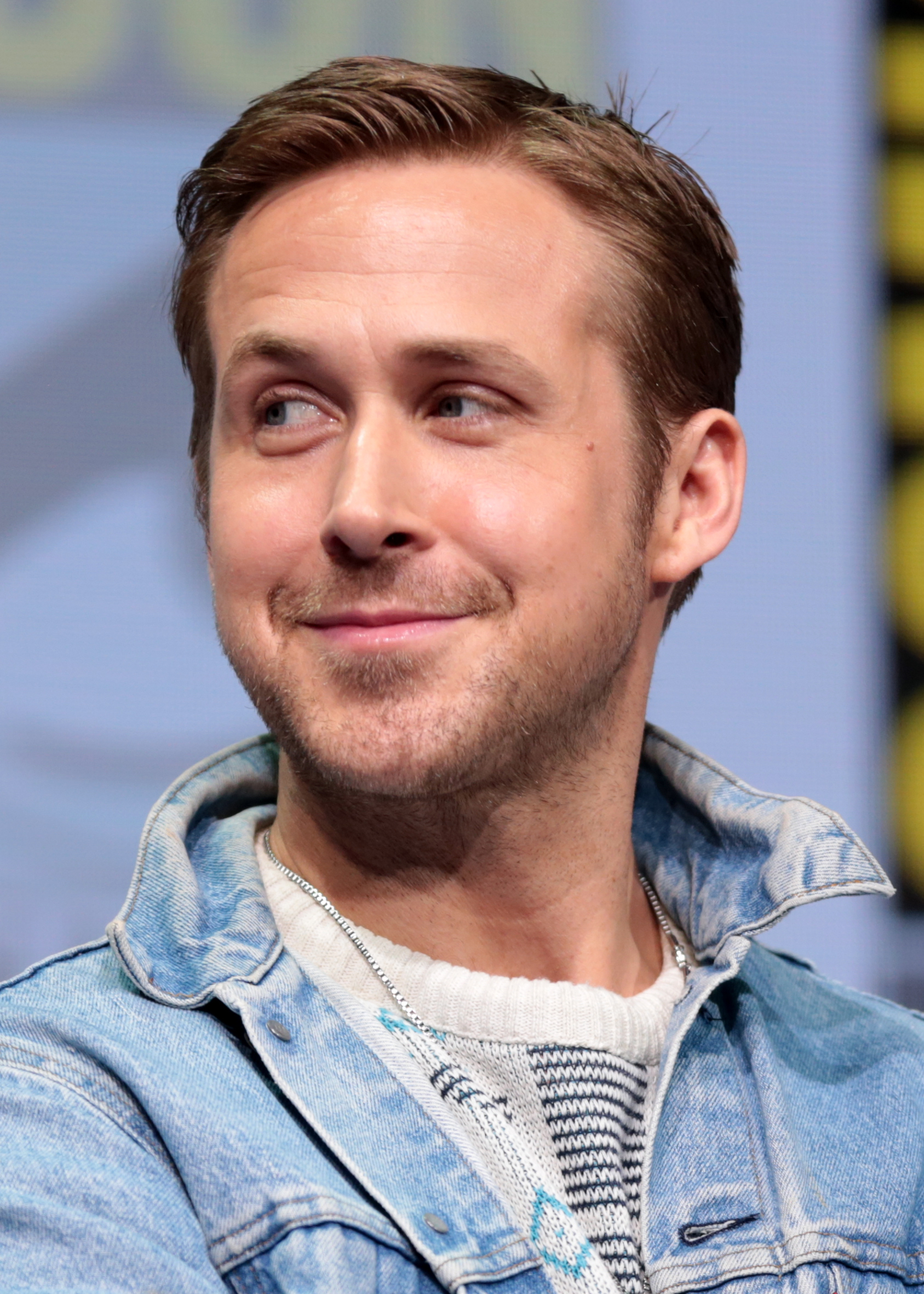
Ryan Gosling, Best Actor in a Motion Picture winner

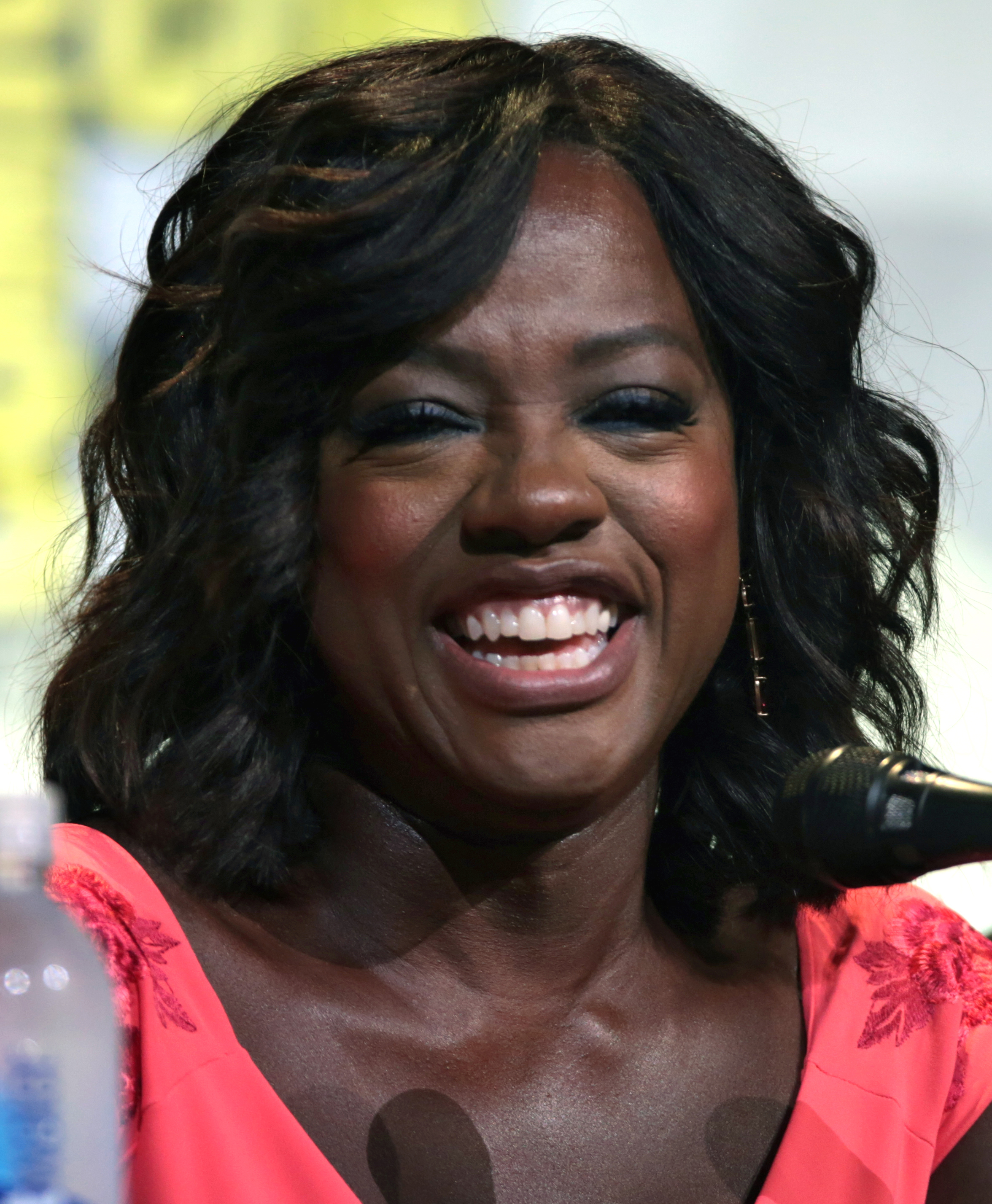
Viola Davis, Best Actress in a Motion Picture winner

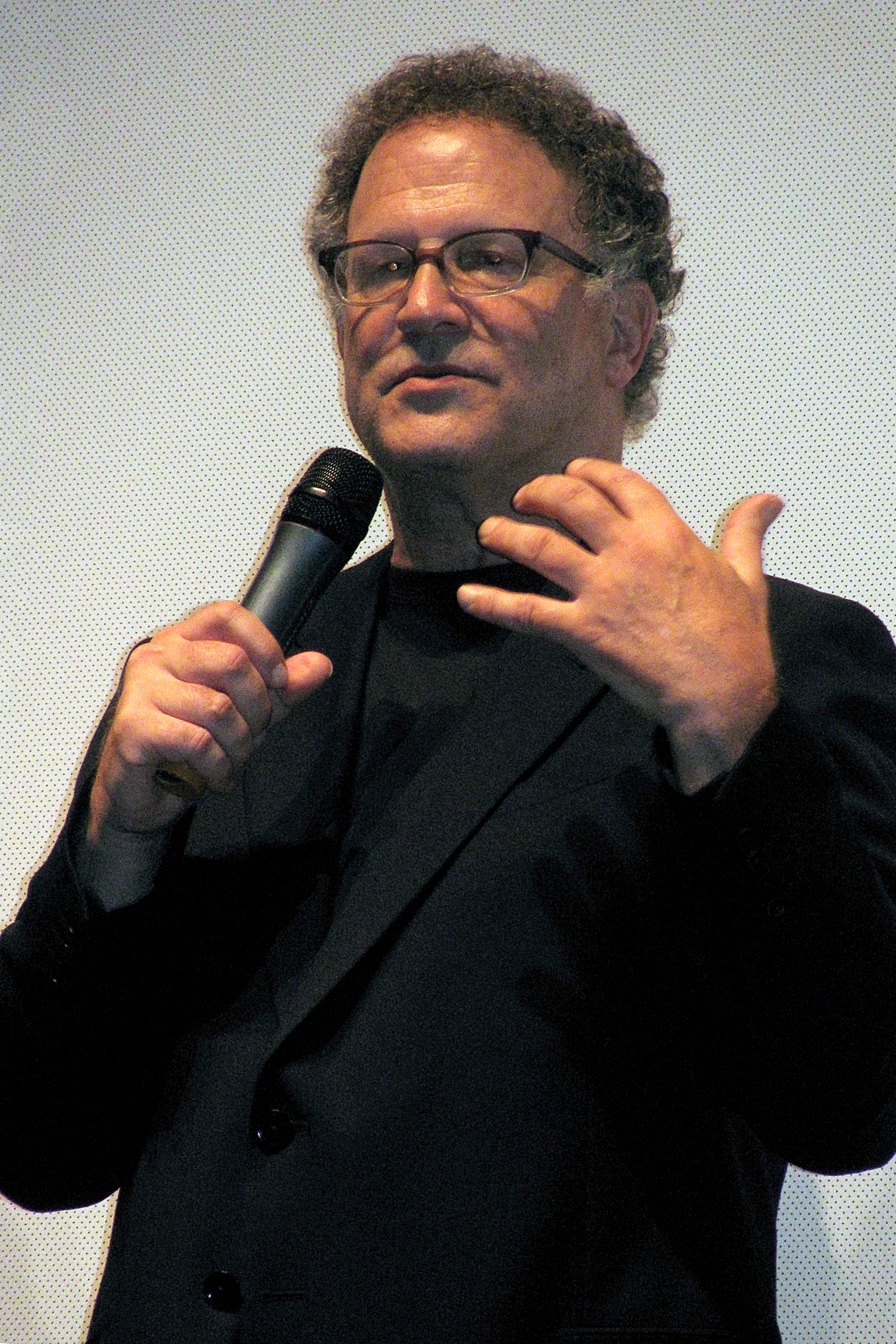
Albert Brooks, Best Supporting Actor in a Motion Picture winner

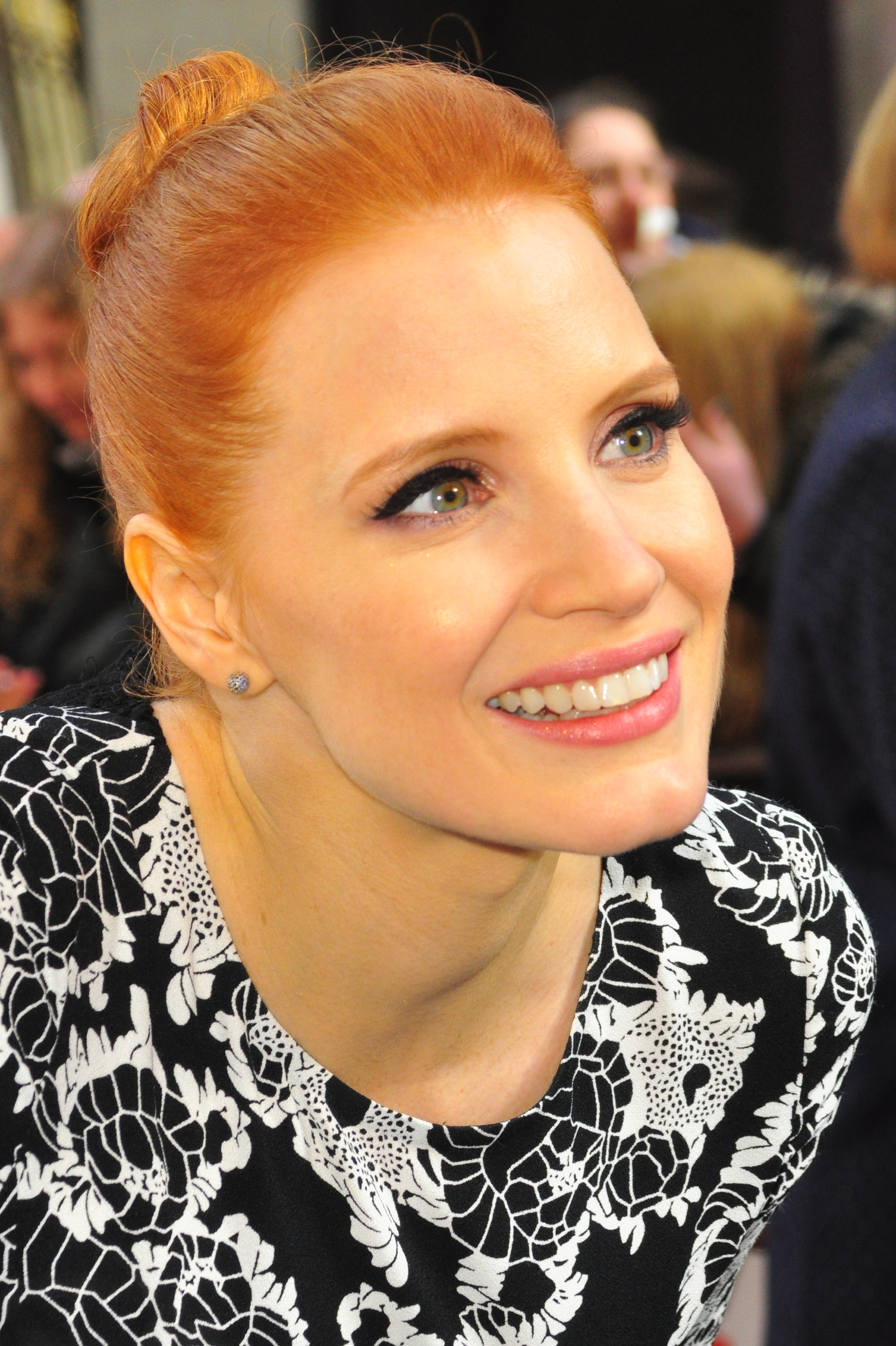
Jessica Chastain, Best Supporting Actress in a Motion Picture winner

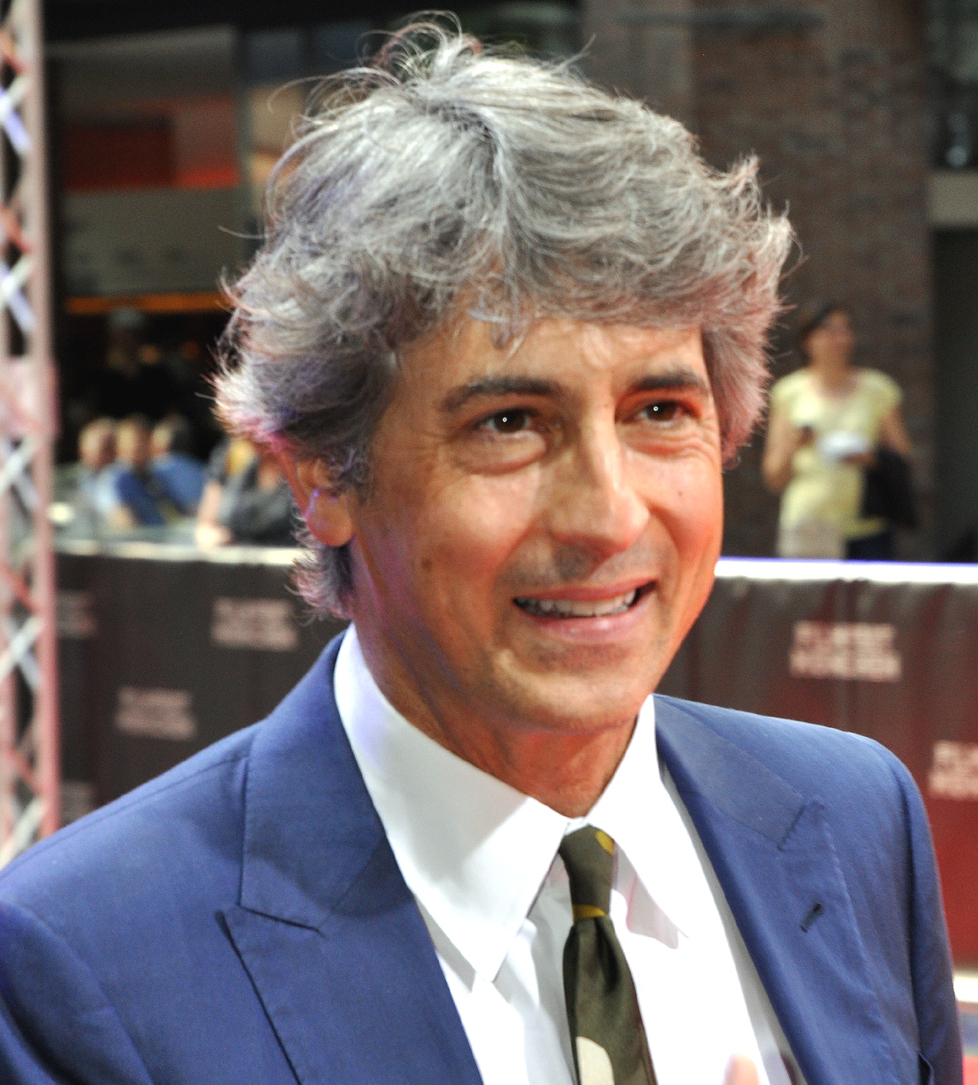
Alexander Payne, Best Adapted Screenplay co-winner

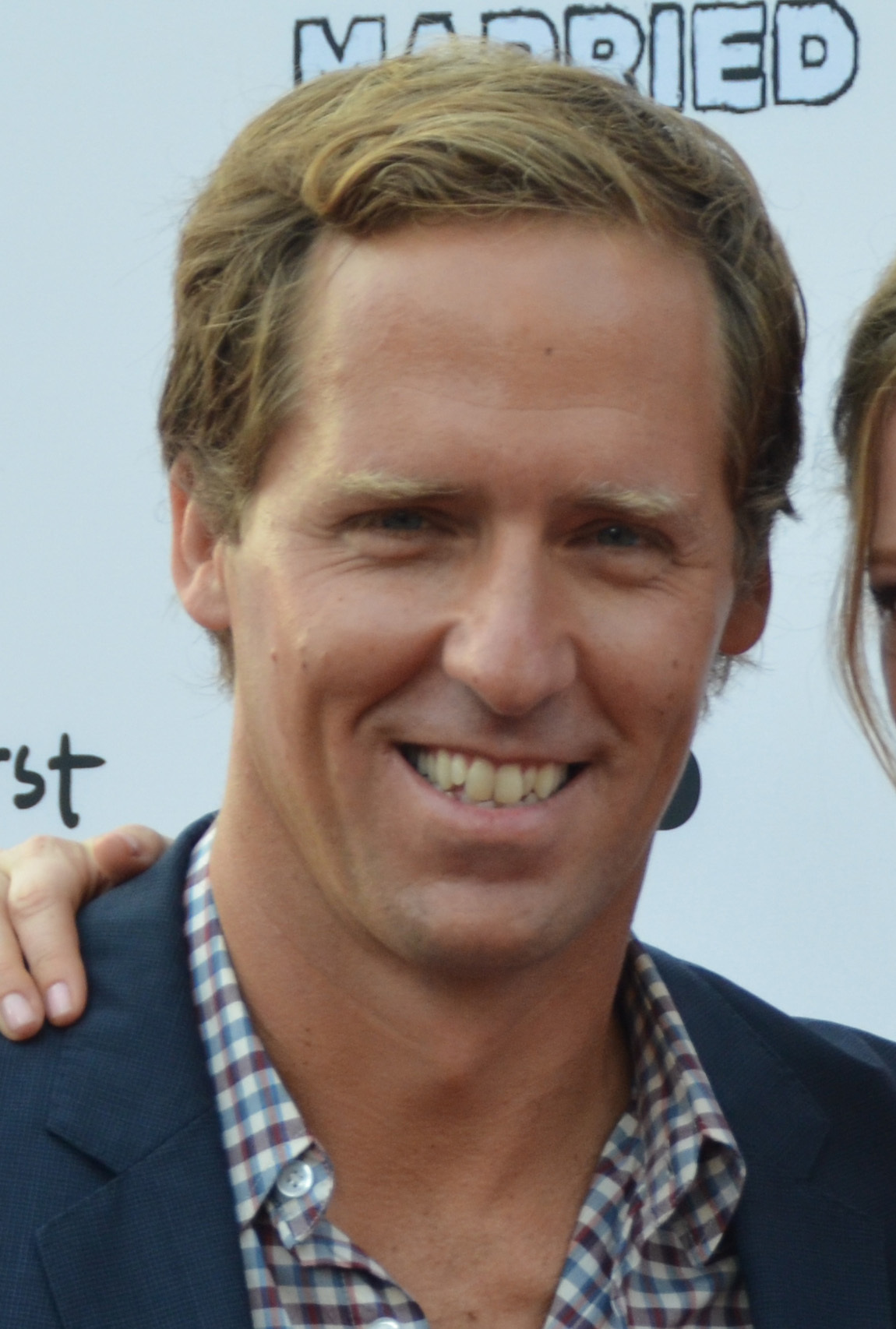
Nat Faxon, Best Adapted Screenplay co-winner

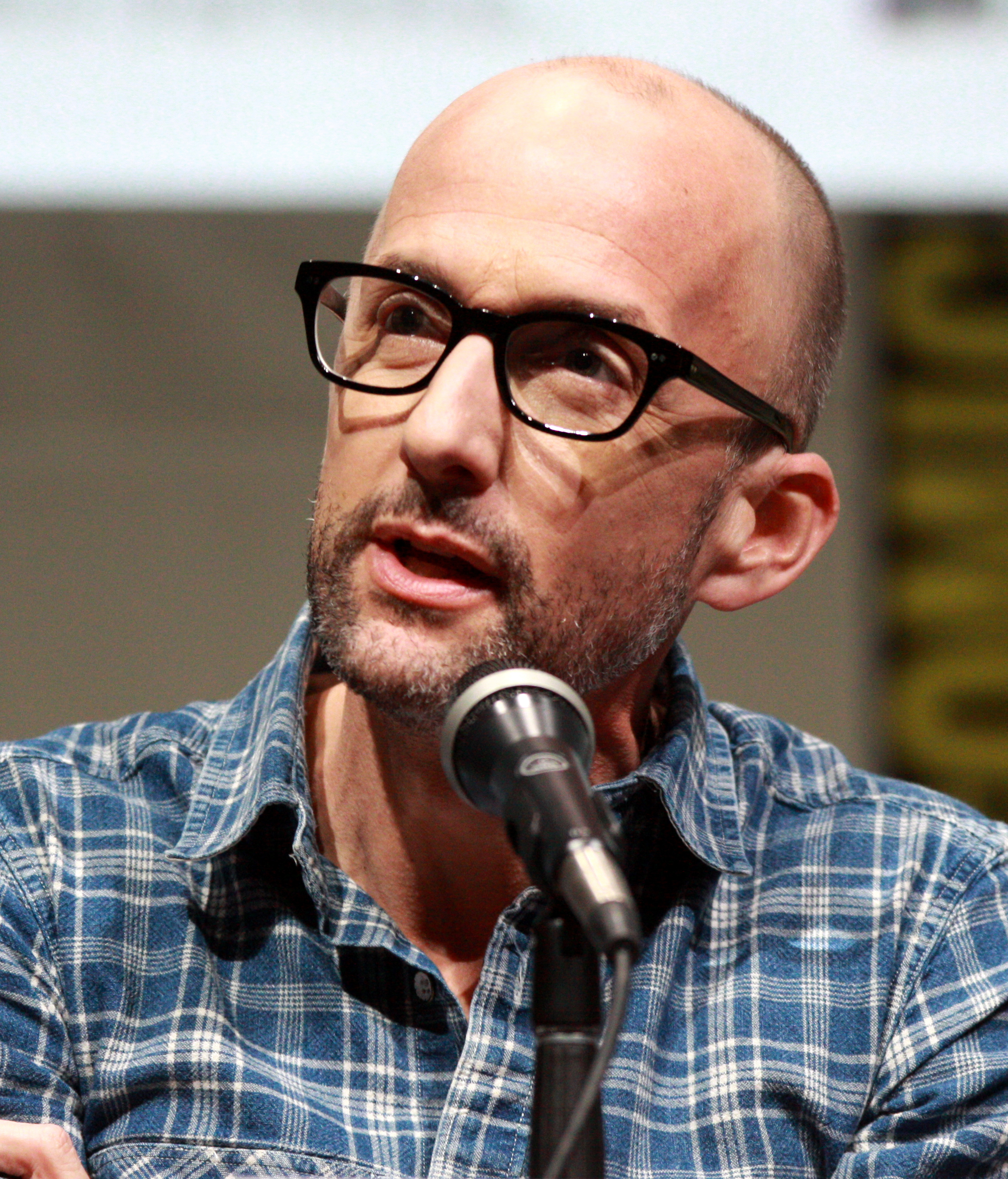
Jim Rash, Best Adapted Screenplay co-winner

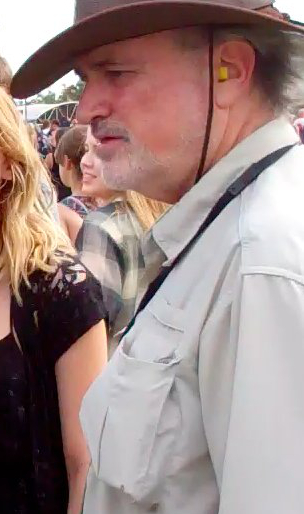
Terrence Malick, Best Original Screenplay winner

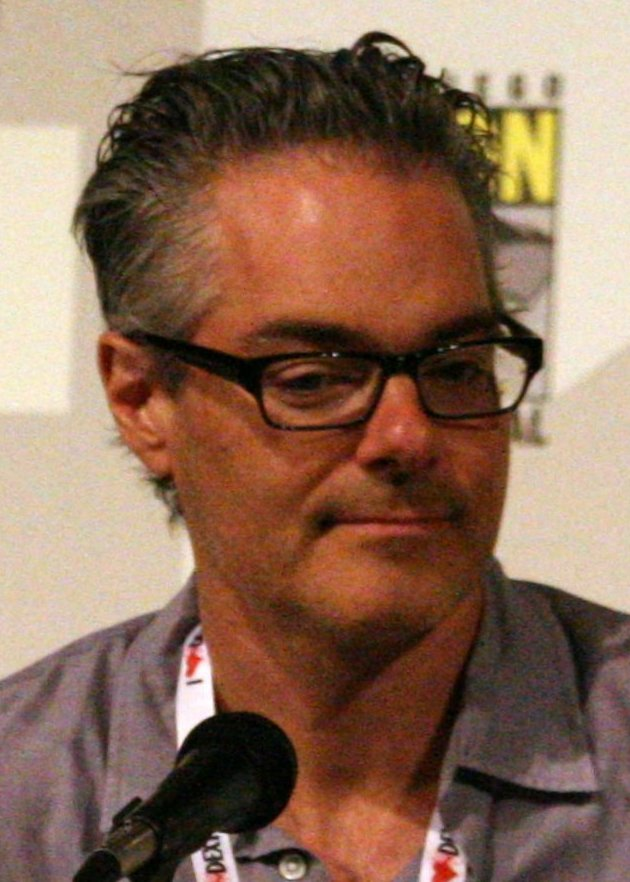
Marco Beltrami, Best Original Score winner

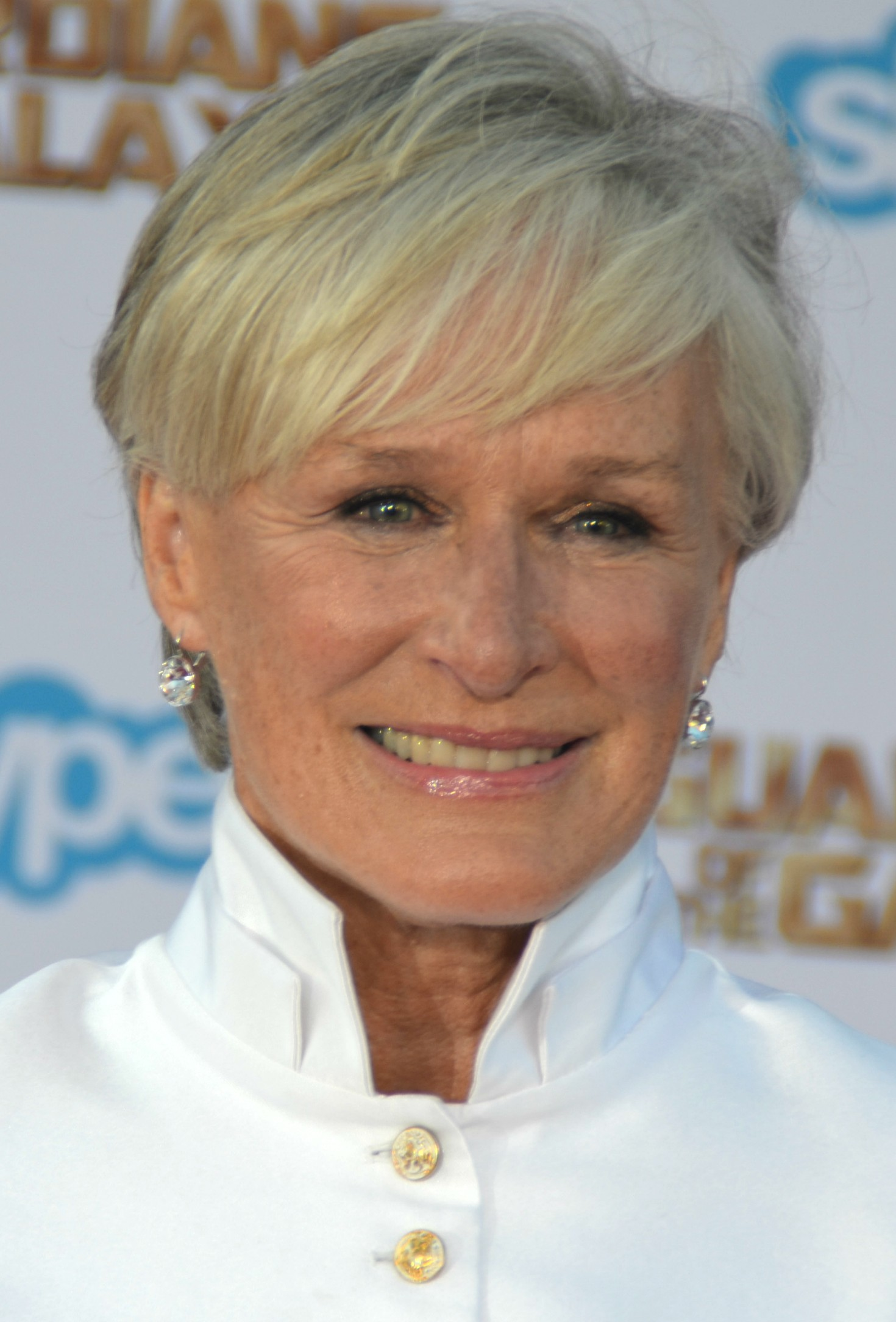
Glenn Close, Best Original Song co-winner

Winners are listed first and highlighted in bold.

Best Film	Best Director
**The Descendants**; The Artist; Drive; The Help; Hugo; Midnight in Paris; Moneyball; Shame; Tinker, Tailor, Soldier, Spy; War Horse	**Nicolas Winding Refn – Drive**; Tomas Alfredson – Tinker, Tailor, Soldier, Spy; Woody Allen – Midnight in Paris; Michel Hazanavicius – The Artist; Steve McQueen – Shame; John Michael McDonagh – The Guard; Alexander Payne – The Descendants; Martin Scorsese – Hugo; Steven Spielberg – War Horse; Tate Taylor – The Help
Best Actor	Best Actress
**Ryan Gosling – Drive as the Driver**; George Clooney – The Descendants as Matthew "Matt" King; Leonardo DiCaprio – J. Edgar as J. Edgar Hoover; Michael Fassbender – Shame as Brandon Sullivan; Brendan Gleeson – The Guard as Sergeant Gerry Boyle; Tom Hardy – Warrior as Tommy Riordan; Woody Harrelson – Rampart as Officer David "Dave" Brown; Gary Oldman – Tinker, Tailor, Soldier, Spy as George Smiley; Brad Pitt – Moneyball as Billy Beane; Michael Shannon – Take Shelter as Curtis LaForche	**Viola Davis – The Help as Aibeleen Clark**; Glenn Close – Albert Nobbs as Albert Nobbs; Olivia Colman – Tyrannosaur as Hannah; Vera Farmiga – Higher Ground as Corinne Walker; Elizabeth Olsen – Martha Marcy May Marlene as Martha / Marcy May / Marlene Lewis; Meryl Streep – The Iron Lady as Margaret Thatcher; Charlize Theron – Young Adult as Mavis Gary; Emily Watson – Oranges and Sunshine as Margaret Humphreys; Michelle Williams – My Week with Marilyn as Marilyn Monroe; Michelle Yeoh – The Lady as Aung San Suu Kyi
Best Supporting Actor	Best Supporting Actress
**Albert Brooks – Drive as Bernie Rose**; Kenneth Branagh – My Week with Marilyn as Laurence Olivier; Colin Farrell – Horrible Bosses as Bobby Pellit; Jonah Hill – Moneyball as Peter Brand; Viggo Mortensen – A Dangerous Method as Sigmund Freud; Nick Nolte – Warrior as Paddy Conlon; Christopher Plummer – Beginners as Hal Fields; Andy Serkis – Rise of the Planet of the Apes as Caesar; Christoph Waltz – Carnage as Alan Cowan; Hugo Weaving – Oranges and Sunshine as Jack	**Jessica Chastain – The Tree of Life as Mrs. O'Brien**; Elle Fanning – Super 8 as Alice Dainard; Lisa Féret – Mozart's Sister as Princess Louise of France; Judy Greer – The Descendants as Julie Speer; Rachel McAdams – Midnight in Paris as Inez; Janet McTeer – Albert Nobbs as Hubert Page; Carey Mulligan – Shame as Sissy Sullivan; Vanessa Redgrave – Coriolanus as Volumnia; Octavia Spencer – The Help as Minerva "Minny" Jackson; Kate Winslet – Carnage as Nancy Cowan
Best Original Screenplay	Best Adapted Screenplay
**The Tree of Life – Terrence Malick**; The Artist – Michel Hazanavicius; The Guard – John Michael McDonagh; Mozart's Sister – René Féret; Shame – Abi Morgan and Steve McQueen; Tyrannosaur – Paddy Considine	**The Descendants – Alexander Payne, Nat Faxon, and Jim Rash**; The Adventures of Tintin – Steven Moffat, Edgar Wright, and Joe Cornish; Albert Nobbs – Glenn Close and John Banville; The Help – Tate Taylor; Moneyball – Steven Zaillian and Aaron Sorkin; War Horse – Lee Hall and Richard Curtis
Best Animated or Mixed Media Film	Best Foreign Language Film
**The Adventures of Tintin**; Kung Fu Panda 2; The Muppets; Puss in Boots; Rango; Rio	**Mysteries of Lisbon (Portugal)**; 13 Assassins (Japan / United Kingdom); Faust (Russia); The Kid with a Bike (Belgium / France / Italy); Las Acacias (Argentina); Le Havre (Finland / France / Germany); Miss Bala (Mexico); Mozart's Sister (France); A Separation (Iran); The Turin Horse (Hungary)
Best Documentary Film	Best Cinematography
**Senna**; American: The Bill Hicks Story; Cave of Forgotten Dreams; The Interrupters; My Perestroika; One Lucky Elephant; Pina; Project Nim; Tabloid; Under Fire: Journalists in Combat	**War Horse – Janusz Kamiński**; The Artist – Guillaume Schiffman; Drive – Newton Thomas Sigel; Faust – Bruno Delbonnel; Hugo – Robert Richardson; The Tree of Life – Emmanuel Lubezki
Best Original Score	Best Original Song
**Soul Surfer – Marco Beltrami**; Drive – Cliff Martinez; Harry Potter and the Deathly Hallows – Part 2 – Alexandre Desplat; Super 8 – Michael Giacchino; War Horse – John Williams; Water for Elephants – James Newton Howard	**"Lay Your Head Down" – Albert Nobbs**; "Bridge of Light" – Happy Feet Two; "Gathering Stories" – We Bought a Zoo; "Hello Hello" – Gnomeo & Juliet; "Life's a Happy Song" – The Muppets; "Man or Muppet" – The Muppets
Best Visual Effects	Best Art Direction and Production Design
**Hugo**; Harry Potter and the Deathly Hallows – Part 2; Rise of the Planet of the Apes; Super 8; Transformers: Dark of the Moon; War Horse	**The Artist**; Anonymous; Faust; Hugo; Mysteries of Lisbon; Water for Elephants
Best Film Editing	Best Sound (Editing and Mixing)
**The Guard**; The Descendants; Drive; Shame; War Horse; Warrior	**Drive**; Harry Potter and the Deathly Hallows – Part 2; Super 8; Transformers: Dark of the Moon; The Tree of Life; War Horse
Best Costume Design	Best Ensemble – Motion Picture
**Water for Elephants**; Anonymous; The Artist; Faust; Jane Eyre; Mysteries of Lisbon	**The Help – Anna Camp, Jessica Chastain, Viola Davis, Nelsan Ellis,** **Bryce Dallas Howard, Dana Ivey, Allison Janney, Leslie Jordan, Brian Kerwin,** **Chris Lowell, Ahna O'Reilly, David Oyelowo, Sissy Spacek, Octavia Spencer,** **Mary Steenburgen, Emma Stone, Cicely Tyson, and Mike Vogel**

== Television winners and nominees ==
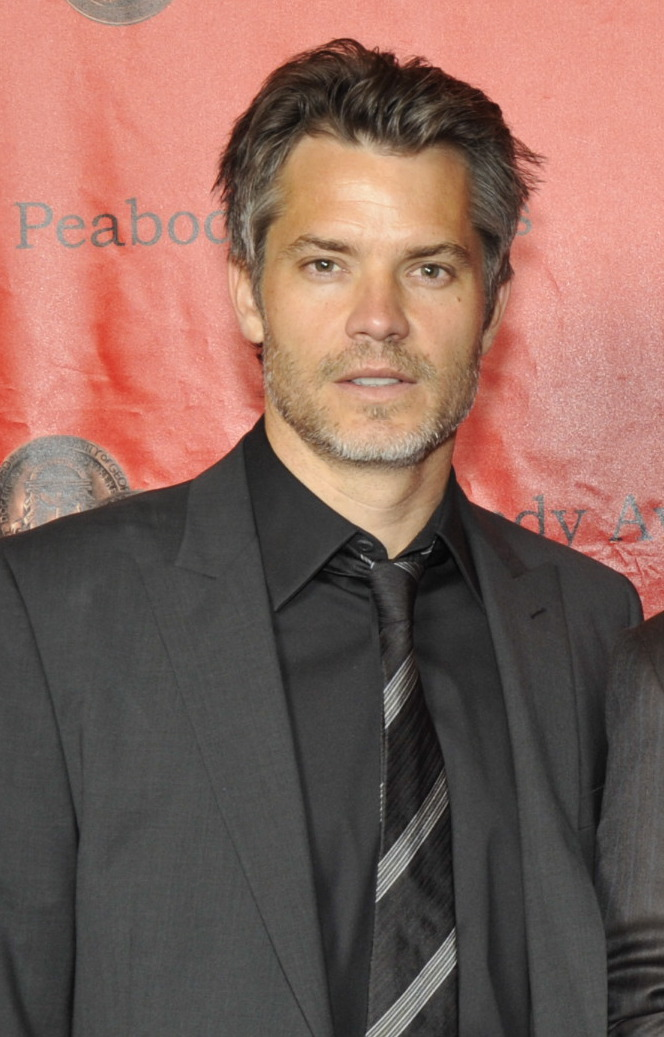
Timothy Olyphant, Best Actor in a Drama Series winner

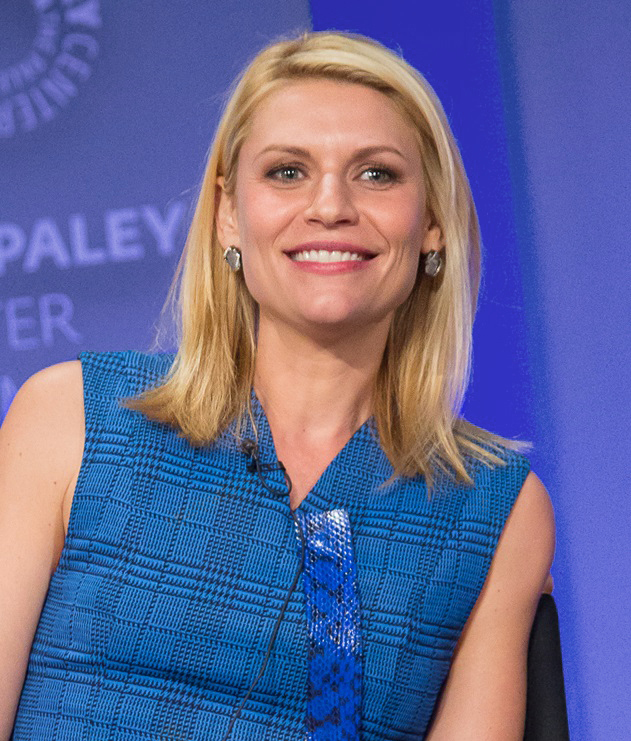
Claire Danes, Best Actress in a Drama Series winner

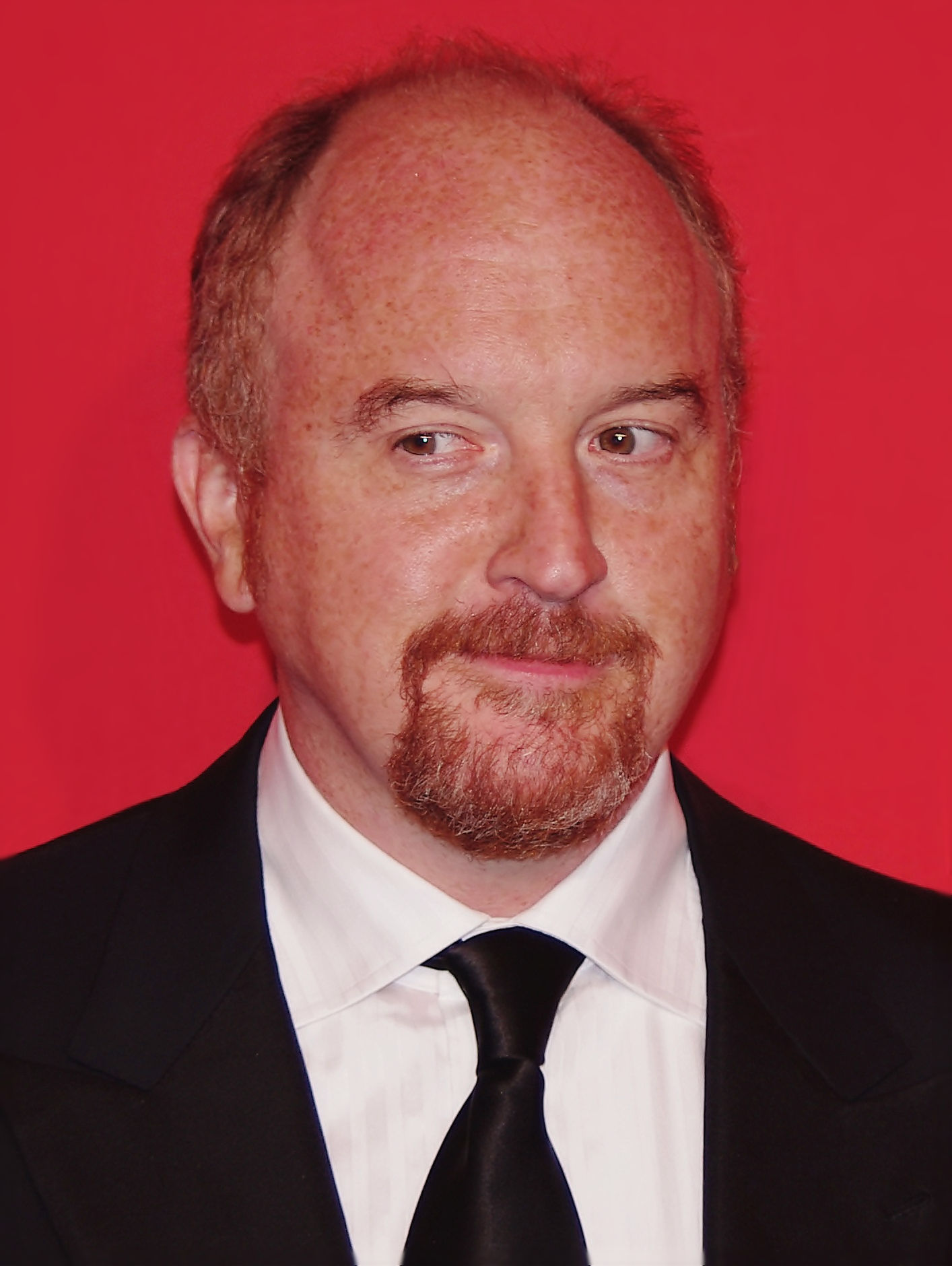
Louis C.K., Best Actor in a Comedy or Musical Series winner

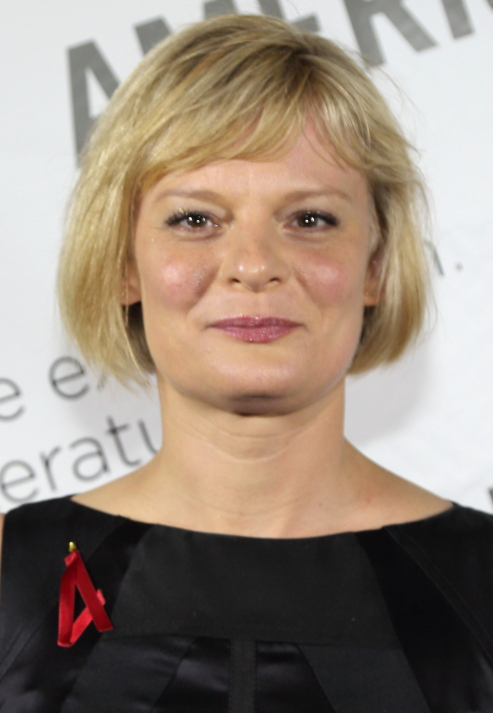
Martha Plimpton, Best Actress in a Comedy or Musical Series winner

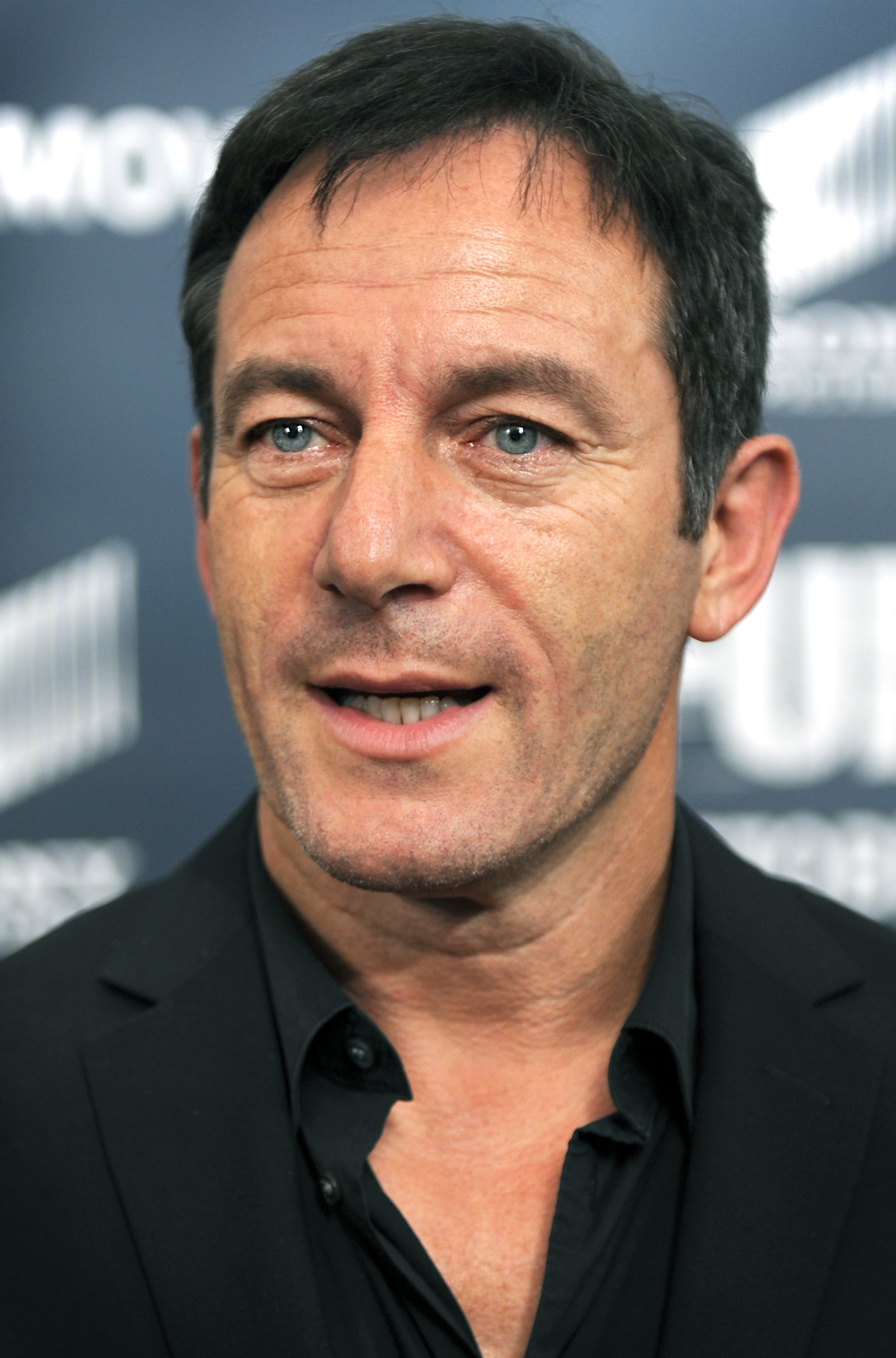
Jason Isaacs, Best Actor in a Miniseries or Television Film winner

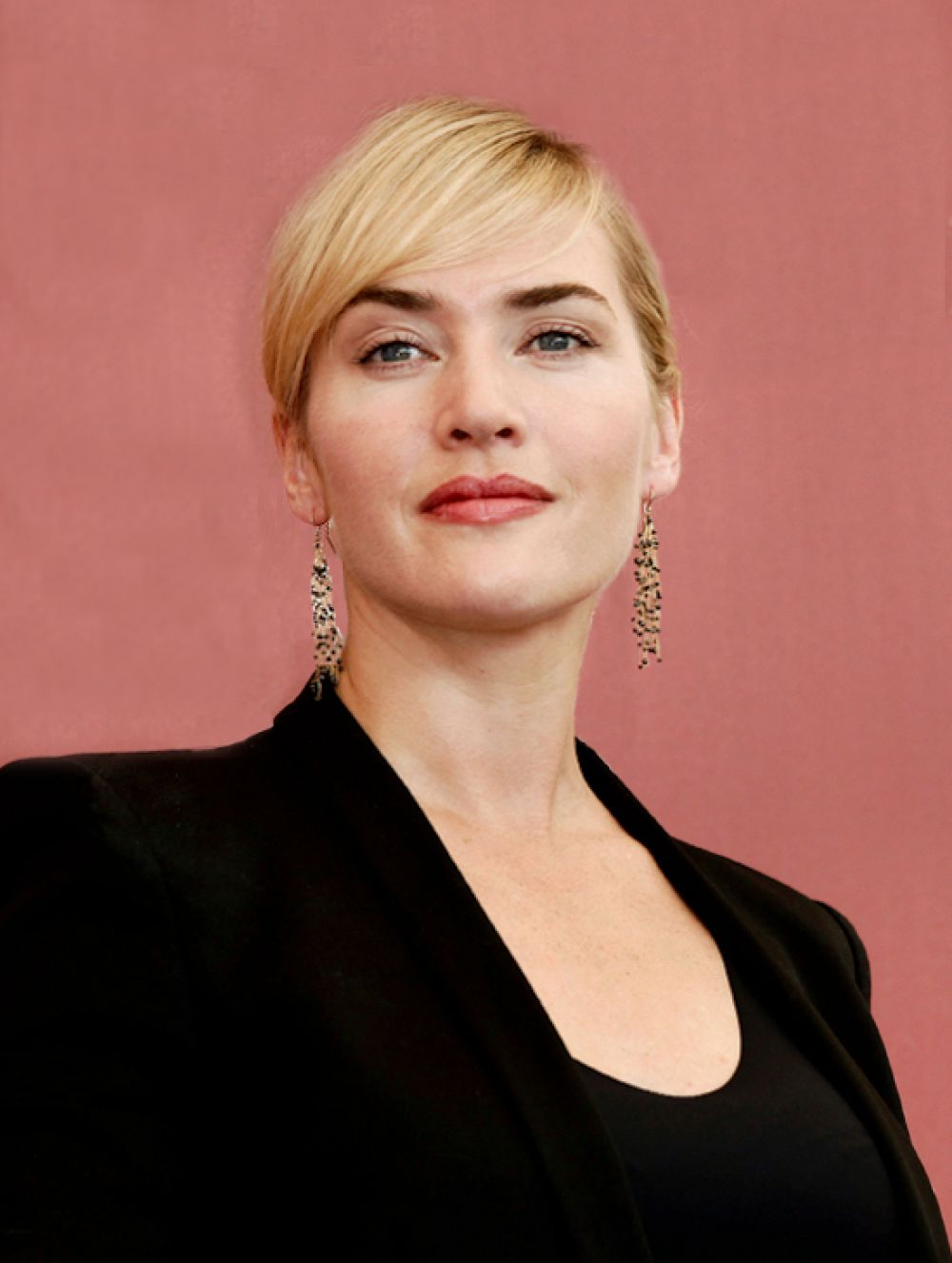
Kate Winslet, Best Actress in a Miniseries or Television Film winner

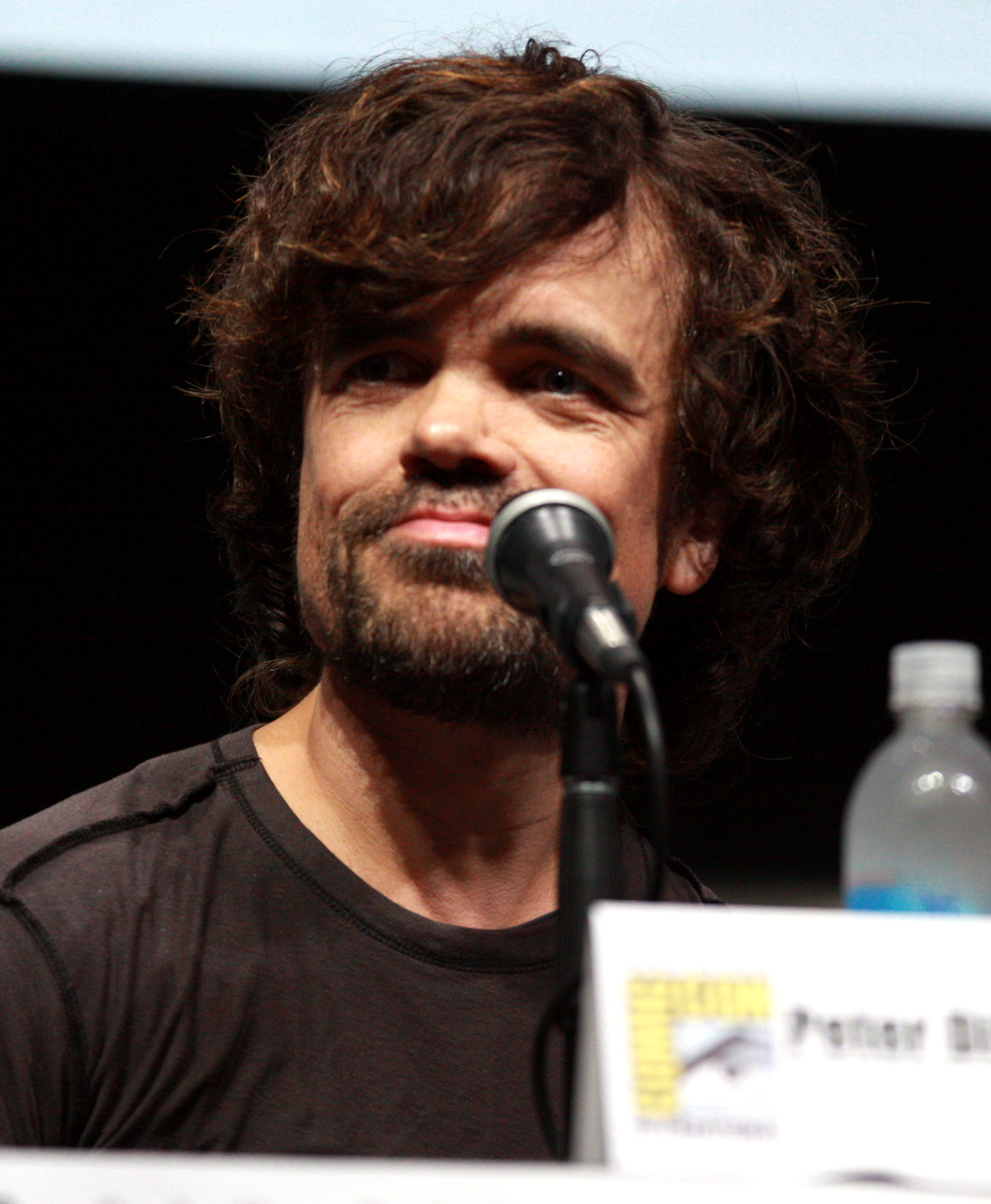
Peter Dinklage, Best Supporting Actor in a Series, Miniseries, or Television Film co-winner

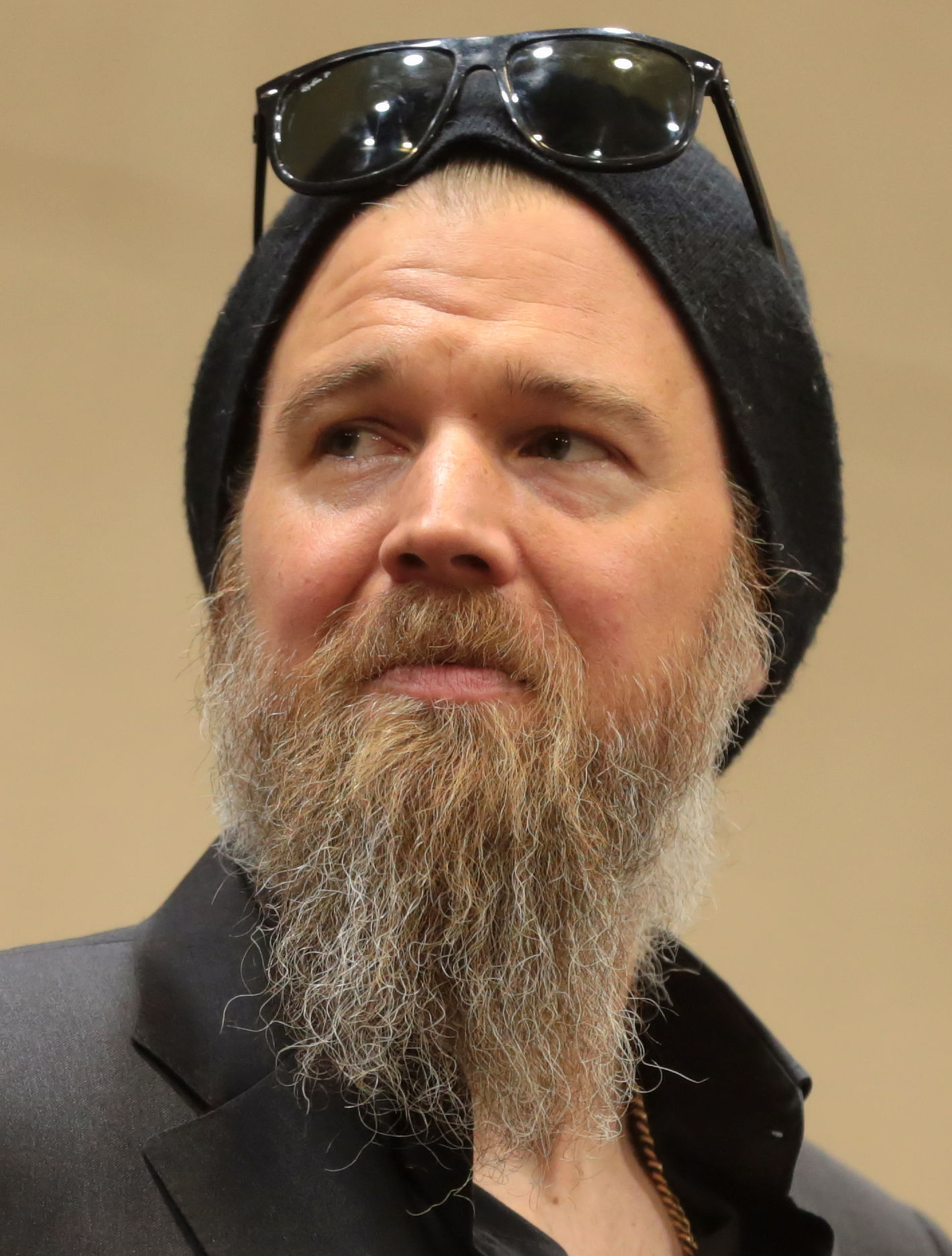
Ryan Hurst, Best Supporting Actor in a Series, Miniseries, or Television Film co-winner

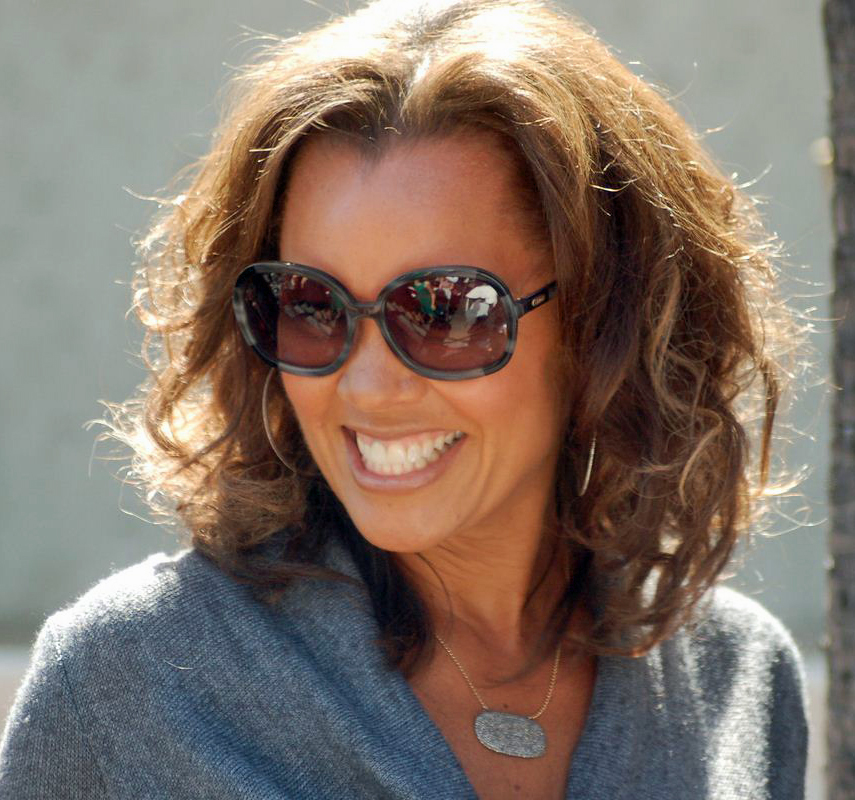
Vanessa Williams, Best Supporting Actress in a Series, Miniseries, or Television Film winner

Winners are listed first and highlighted in bold.

Best Drama Series	Best Comedy or Musical Series
**Justified – FX**; Boardwalk Empire – HBO; Breaking Bad – AMC; Friday Night Lights – NBC / The 101 Network; Sons of Anarchy – FX; Treme – HBO	**It's Always Sunny in Philadelphia – FX**; The Big C – Showtime; Community – NBC; Episodes – Showtime; Louie – FX; Modern Family – ABC
Best Miniseries or TV Film	Best Genre Series
**Mildred Pierce – HBO**; Cinema Verite – HBO; Downton Abbey – PBS; Page Eight – PBS; Thurgood – HBO; Too Big to Fail – HBO	**American Horror Story – FX**; Game of Thrones – HBO; Once Upon a Time – ABC; Torchwood – BBC; True Blood – HBO; The Walking Dead – AMC
Best Actor in a Drama Series	Best Actress in a Drama Series
**Timothy Olyphant – Justified**; Steve Buscemi – Boardwalk Empire; Kyle Chandler – Friday Night Lights; Bryan Cranston – Breaking Bad; William H. Macy – Shameless; Wendell Pierce – Treme	**Claire Danes – Homeland**; Connie Britton – Friday Night Lights; Mireille Enos – The Killing; Julianna Margulies – The Good Wife; Katey Sagal – Sons of Anarchy; Eve Myles – Torchwood
Best Actor in a Miniseries or TV Film	Best Actress in a Miniseries or TV Film
**Jason Isaacs – Case Histories**; Hugh Bonneville – Downton Abbey; Idris Elba – Luther; Laurence Fishburne – Thurgood; William Hurt – Too Big to Fail; Bill Nighy – Page Eight	**Kate Winslet – Mildred Pierce**; Taraji P. Henson – Taken from Me: The Tiffany Rubin Story; Diane Lane – Cinema Verite; Jean Marsh – Upstairs, Downstairs; Elizabeth McGovern – Downton Abbey; Rachel Weisz – Page Eight
Best Actor in a Musical or Comedy Series	Best Actress in a Musical or Comedy Series
**Louis C.K. – Louie**; Martin Clunes – Doc Martin; Charlie Day – It's Always Sunny in Philadelphia; Matt LeBlanc – Episodes; Joel McHale – Community; Elijah Wood – Wilfred	**Martha Plimpton – Raising Hope**; Zooey Deschanel – New Girl; Felicity Huffman – Desperate Housewives; Laura Linney – The Big C; Melissa McCarthy – Mike & Molly; Amy Poehler – Parks and Recreation
Best Supporting Actor in a Series, Miniseries, or TV Film	Best Supporting Actress in a Series, Miniseries, or TV Film
**Peter Dinklage – Game of Thrones (TIE)**; **Ryan Hurst – Sons of Anarchy (TIE)**; Ty Burrell – Modern Family; Donald Glover – Community; Walton Goggins – Justified; Neil Patrick Harris – How I Met Your Mother; Guy Pearce – Mildred Pierce; James Woods – Too Big to Fail	**Vanessa Williams – Desperate Housewives**; Michelle Forbes – The Killing; Kelly Macdonald – Boardwalk Empire; Margo Martindale – Justified; Maya Rudolph – Up All Night; Maggie Smith – Downton Abbey; Sofía Vergara – Modern Family; Evan Rachel Wood – Mildred Pierce

== New Media winners and nominees ==
Winners are listed first and highlighted in bold.

Best Classic DVD	Best DVD Extras
**West Side Story: 50th Anniversary Edition**; Blow Out; Citizen Kane: Ultimate Collector's Edition; A Clockwork Orange: 40th Anniversary Edition; Once Upon a Time in the West	**Star Wars: The Complete Saga**; Blue Velvet; Das Boot: 2-Disc Collector's Set; Planet Earth: Limited Edition; Super 8: 2-Disc Edition
Outstanding Action/Adventure Game	Outstanding Mobile Game
**Batman: Arkham City (Rocksteady Studios)**; The Legend of Zelda: Skyward Sword (Nintendo); Limbo (Double Eleven / Playdead); Portal 2 (Valve)	**Infinity Blade II (Chair Entertainment / Epic Games)**; Patapon 3 (Pyramid / Japan Studio); Pokémon Black and White (Game Freak); World of Goo (2D Boy)
Outstanding Role Playing Game	Outstanding Sports/Racing Game
**The Elder Scrolls V: Skyrim (Bethesda)**; Bastion (Supergiant Games); Dark Souls (FromSoftware); Total War: Shogun 2 (Creative Assembly / Feral Interactive)	**Forza Motorsport 4 (Turn 10 Studios)**; FIFA 12 (Electronic Arts); MLB 11: The Show (San Diego Studio); NBA 2K12 (Virtuos / Visual Concepts)
Outstanding Youth DVD	
**The Lion King: Diamond Edition**; Harry Potter: Complete 8-Film Collection; The Rocketeer: 20th Anniversary Edition; Rocky and His Friends: Rocky & Bullwinkle & Friends Edition; Secretariat	

== Awards breakdown ==
=== Film ===
Winners:

4 / 8 Drive: Best Actor / Best Director / Best Sound (Editing and Mixing) / Best Supporting Actor
2 / 4 The Tree of Life: Best Original Screenplay / Best Supporting Actress
2 / 6 The Descendants: Best Adapted Screenplay / Best Film
2 / 6 The Help: Best Actress / Best Ensemble – Motion Picture
1 / 1 Senna: Best Documentary Film
1 / 1 Soul Surfer: Best Original Score
1 / 2 The Adventures of Tintin: Best Animated or Mixed Media Film
1 / 3 Mysteries of Lisbon: Best Foreign Language Film
1 / 3 Water for Elephants: Best Costume Design
1 / 4 Albert Nobbs: Best Original Song
1 / 4 The Guard: Best Film Editing
1 / 5 Hugo: Best Visual Effects
1 / 6 The Artist: Best Art Direction and Production Design
1 / 8 War Horse: Best Cinematography
1 / 1 The First Grader: Best Educational Motion Picture

Losers:

0 / 6 Shame
0 / 4 Faust, Moneyball, Super 8
0 / 3 Harry Potter and the Deathly Hallows – Part 2, Midnight in Paris, Mozart's Sister, The Muppets, Tinker, Tailor, Soldier, Spy, Warrior
0 / 2 Anonymous, Carnage, My Week with Marilyn, Oranges and Sunshine, Rise of the Planet of the Apes, Transformers: Dark of the Moon, Tyrannosaur

=== Television ===
Winners:

2 / 4 Justified: Best Actor in a Drama Series / Best Drama Series
2 / 5 Mildred Pierce: Best Actress in a Miniseries or TV Film / Best Miniseries or TV Film
1 / 1 American Horror Story: Best Genre Series
1 / 1 Case Histories: Best Actor in a Miniseries or TV Film
1 / 1 Homeland: Best Actress in a Drama Series
1 / 1 Raising Hope: Best Actress in a Musical or Comedy Series
1 / 2 Desperate Housewives: Best Supporting Actress in a Series, Miniseries, or TV Film
1 / 2 Game of Thrones: Best Supporting Actor in a Series, Miniseries, or TV Film
1 / 2 It's Always Sunny in Philadelphia: Best Musical or Comedy Series
1 / 2 Louie: Best Actor in a Musical or Comedy Series
1 / 3 Sons of Anarchy: Best Supporting Actor in a Series, Miniseries, or TV Film

Losers:

0 / 4 Downton Abbey
0 / 3 Boardwalk Empire, Community, Friday Night Lights, Modern Family, Page Eight, Too Big to Fail
0 / 2 The Big C, Breaking Bad, Cinema Verite, Episodes, The Killing, Thurgood, Torchwood, Treme
