= Satellite Awards =

Annual awards for film, television, and media

Satellite Award
- Current: 30th Satellite Awards
- Country: United States
- Presented by: International Press Academy
- First award: 1997; 29 years ago
- Website: pressacademy.com/awards_home

The Satellite Awards are annual awards given by the International Press Academy that are commonly noted in entertainment industry journals and blogs. The awards were originally known as the Golden Satellite Awards. The award ceremonies take place each year at the InterContinental Hotel in Century City, Los Angeles.

== Categories ==
=== Film ===
- Best Actor (includes previous drama, musical, and comedy awards) *
- Best Actress (includes previous drama, musical, and comedy awards) *
- Best Animated or Mixed Media Feature
- Best Art Direction and Production Design
- Best Cast (2004–present)
- Best Cinematography
- Best Costume Design
- Best Director
- Best Documentary Film
- Best Editing
- Best Film (includes previous drama, musical, and comedy awards) *
- Best Foreign Language Film
- Best Original Score
- Best Original Song
- Best Screenplay – Adapted
- Best Screenplay – Original
- Best Sound (1999–present)
- Best Supporting Actor (includes previous drama, musical, and comedy awards) *
- Best Supporting Actress (includes previous drama, musical, and comedy awards) *
- Best Visual Effects

In 2011, the IPA combined the Drama and Comedy/Musical film awards into one category, affecting Best Film, Actor, Actress, Supporting Actor and Supporting Actress awards.

=== Television ===
- Best Actor – Drama Series
- Best Actor – Musical or Comedy Series
- Best Actor – Miniseries or Television Film
- Best Actress – Drama Series
- Best Actress – Musical or Comedy Series
- Best Actress – Miniseries or Television Film
- Best Cast (or Best Ensemble) (2005–present)
- Best TV Series – Drama
- Best TV Series – Genre
- Best TV Series – Musical or Comedy
- Best Miniseries or Television Film (1996–1998; 2011–2013; 2016)
- Best Miniseries (1999–2009; 2014–2015; 2017–present)
- Best Television Film (1999–2009; 2014–2015; 2017–present)
- Best Supporting Actor (2001–present)
- Best Supporting Actress (2001–present)

=== New Media ===
- Outstanding Overall Blu-Ray/DVD
- Outstanding Youth Blu-Ray/DVD
- Outstanding Mobile Game
- Outstanding Platform Action/Adventure Game
- Outstanding Role Playing Game

=== Special Achievement ===
- Auteur Award (2005–present)
- Mary Pickford Award (1996–present)
- Nikola Tesla Award (2002–present)
- Humanitarian Award (2010–2012 & 2014–present)
- Outstanding New Talent (1996–2013 & 2016–present)

== Ceremonies ==
- 1st Golden Satellite Awards – January 15, 1997
- 2nd Golden Satellite Awards – February 22, 1998
- 3rd Golden Satellite Awards – January 17, 1999
- 4th Golden Satellite Awards – January 16, 2000
- 5th Golden Satellite Awards – January 14, 2001
- 6th Golden Satellite Awards – January 19, 2002
- 7th Golden Satellite Awards – January 12, 2003
- 8th Golden Satellite Awards – February 21, 2004
- 9th Golden Satellite Awards – January 23, 2005
- 10th Satellite Awards – December 17, 2005
- 11th Satellite Awards – December 18, 2006
- 12th Satellite Awards – December 16, 2007
- 13th Satellite Awards – December 14, 2008
- 14th Satellite Awards – December 20, 2009
- 15th Satellite Awards – December 19, 2010
- 16th Satellite Awards – December 18, 2011
- 17th Satellite Awards – December 16, 2012
- 18th Satellite Awards – February 23, 2014
- 19th Satellite Awards – February 15, 2015
- 20th Satellite Awards – February 21, 2016
- 21st Satellite Awards – February 19, 2017
- 22nd Satellite Awards – February 11, 2018
- 23rd Satellite Awards – February 17, 2019
- 24th Satellite Awards – March 1, 2020
- 25th Satellite Awards – February 15, 2021
- 26th Satellite Awards – April 2, 2022
- 27th Satellite Awards – March 3, 2023
- 28th Satellite Awards – March 3, 2024
- 29th Satellite Awards – January 26, 2025
- 30th Satellite Awards - March 8, 2026
