= Satellite Award for Outstanding Mobile Game =

Retired annual media award

The Satellite Award for Outstanding Mobile Game is an annual award given by the International Press Academy as one of its Satellite Awards.

== Winners and nominees ==
Year	Winners and nominees	Developer	Publisher
2011	Infinity Blade II	Chair Entertainment, Epic Games	Epic Games
2011	Patapon 3	Pyramid, Japan Studio	Sony Computer Entertainment
2011	Pokémon White & Black	Game Freak	The Pokémon Company
2011	World of Goo	2D Boy	2D Boy, Nintendo (WiiWare)
2012	Super Monsters Ate My Condo	Adult Swim Digital	PikPok
2012	Amazing Alex	Rovio	Rovio
2012	Horn	Phosphor Games	Zynga
2012	Huebrix	Yellow Monkey Studios	Yellow Monkey Studios
2012	Wildblood	Gameloft	Gameloft
2013	Badland	Frogmind	Frogmind
2013	XCOM: Enemy Unknown for iOS	Firaxis Games	2K Games, Feral Interactive
2013	Ridiculous Fishing	Vlambeer	Vlambeer
2013	The Room	Fireproof Games	Fireproof Games
2013	Warhammer Quest	Rodeo Games	Rodeo Games
2014	XCOM: Enemy Within for Mobile	Firaxis Games, Feral Interactive	2K Games, Feral Interactive
2014	80 Days	Inkle	Inkle
2014	Hearthstone: Heroes of Warcraft	Blizzard Entertainment	Blizzard Entertainment
2014	Monument Valley	Ustwo	Ustwo
2014	The Room Two	Fireproof Games	Fireproof Games
2014	TwoDots	Playdots	Playdots
2016	Mini Metro	Dinosaur Polo Club	Dinosaur Polo Club
2016	The Banner Saga 2	Stoic Studio	Versus Evil
2016	FIFA Mobile	EA Mobile	EA Sports
2016	Komrad	Sentient Play LLC	Sentient Play LLC
2016	Retsnom	Magic Cube	Magic Cube
