= 18th Satellite Awards =

US awards ceremony for film and television

- Date: February 23, 2014

Highlights
- Best film: 12 Years a Slave
- Best television drama: Breaking Bad
- Best television musical/comedy: Orange Is the New Black
- Best director: Steve McQueen for 12 Years a Slave

The 18th Satellite Awards ceremony, honoring the year's outstanding performers, films, television shows, home videos and interactive media, was presented by the International Press Academy at the Hyatt Regency Century Plaza in Century City, Los Angeles, as part of the 2013–14 film awards season.

The nominations were announced on December 2, 2013. The winners were announced on February 23, 2014.

== Special achievement awards ==
- Auteur Award (for singular vision and unique artistic control over the elements of production) – Guillermo del Toro
- Mary Pickford Award (for outstanding contribution to the entertainment industry) – Mike Medavoy
- Nikola Tesla Award (for visionary achievement in filmmaking technology) – Garrett Brown
- Honorary Satellite Award – Ryan Coogler (Fruitvale Station)
- Independent Producer of the Year Award – Gabrielle Tana
- Newcomer Award – Michael B. Jordan (Fruitvale Station) and Sophie Nélisse (The Book Thief)

== Motion picture winners and nominees ==
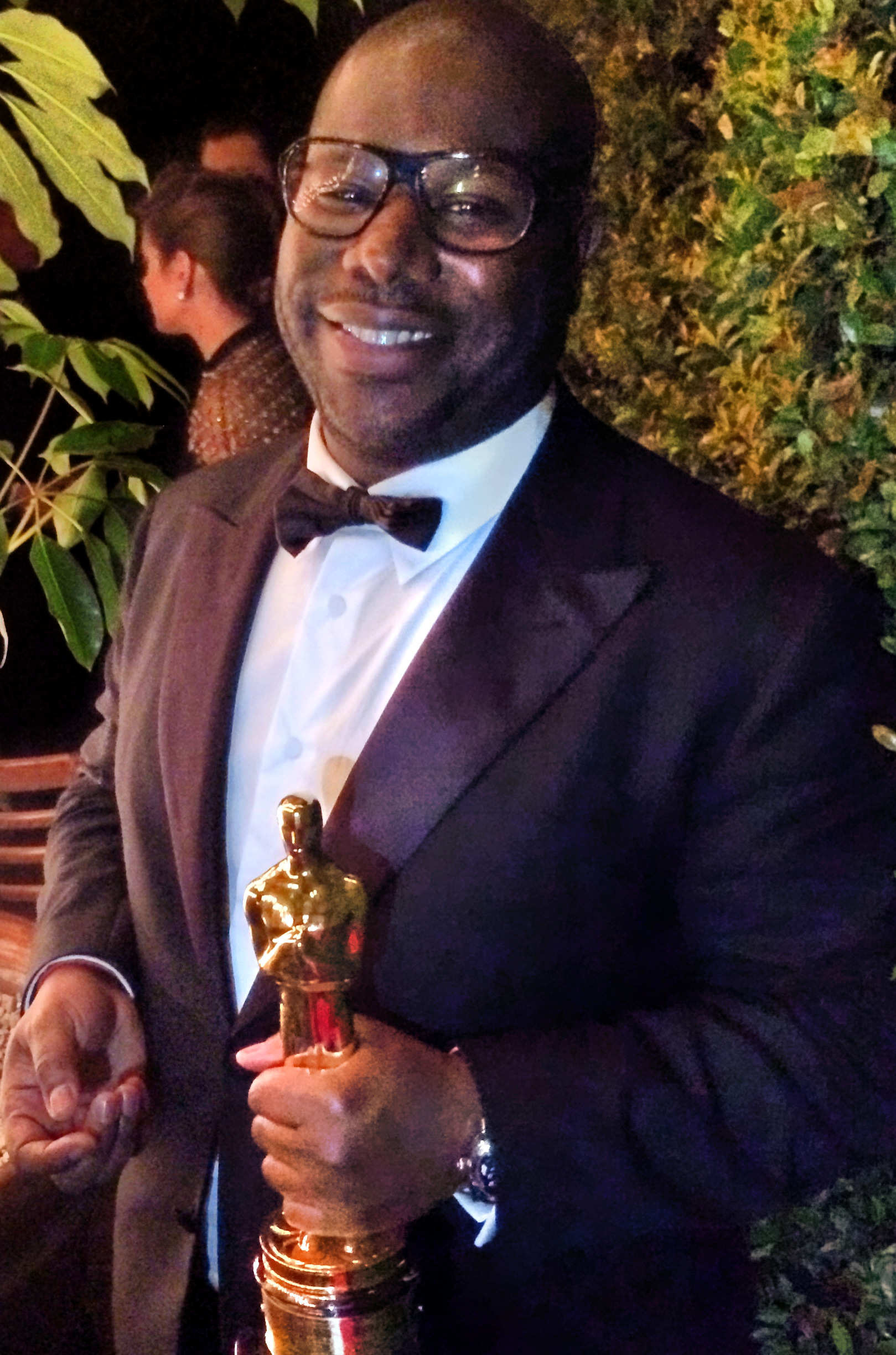
Steve McQueen, Best Director winner

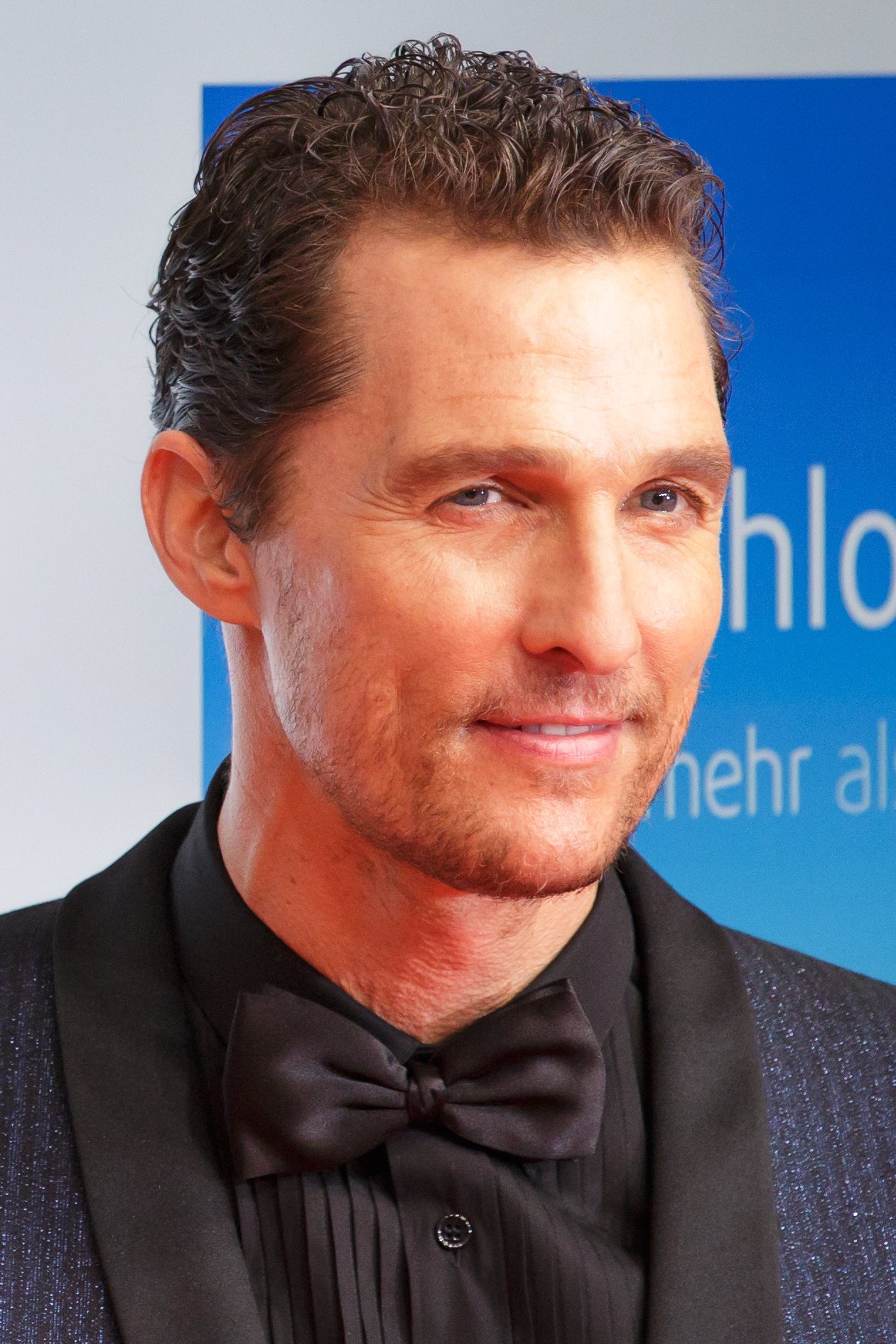
Matthew McConaughey, Best Actor in a Motion Picture winner

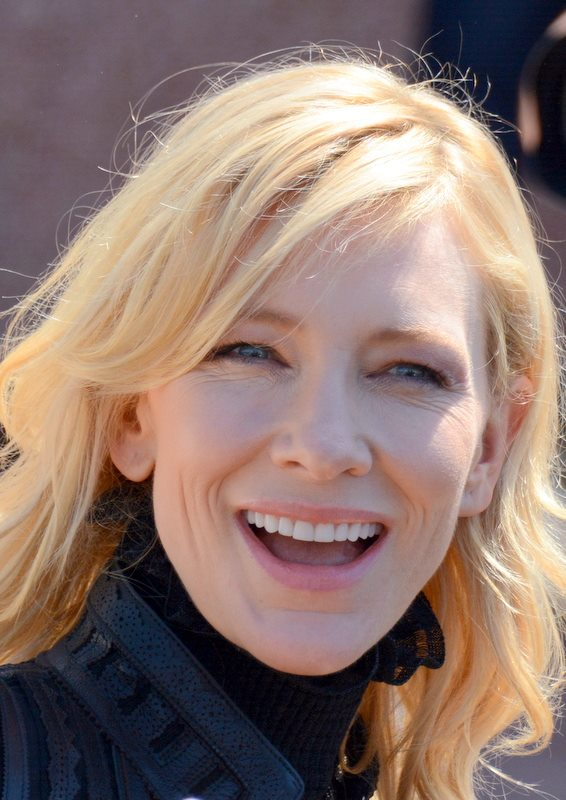
Cate Blanchett, Best Actress in a Motion Picture winner

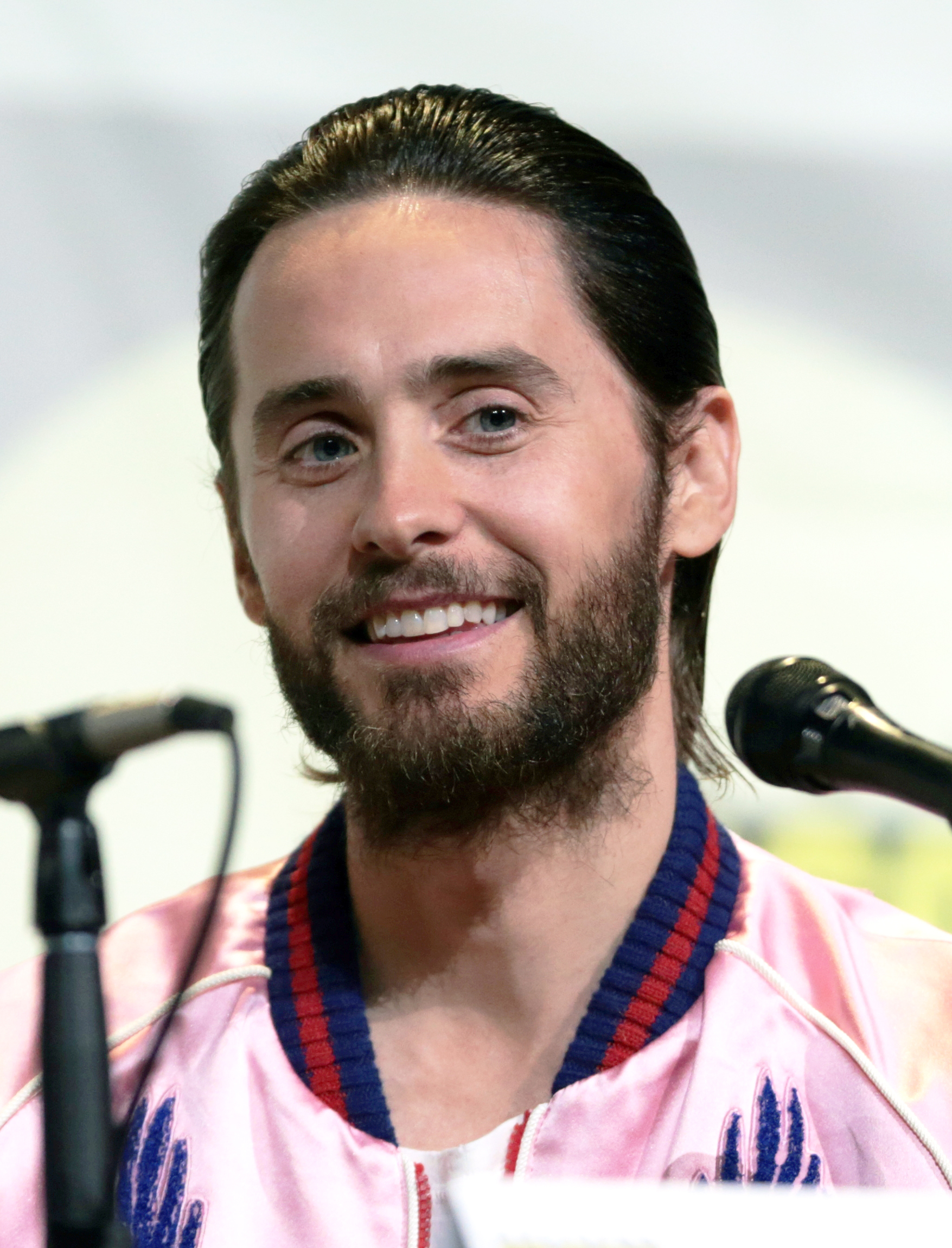
Jared Leto, Best Supporting Actor in a Motion Picture winner

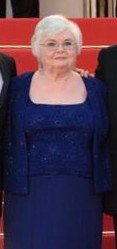
June Squibb, Best Supporting Actress in a Motion Picture winner

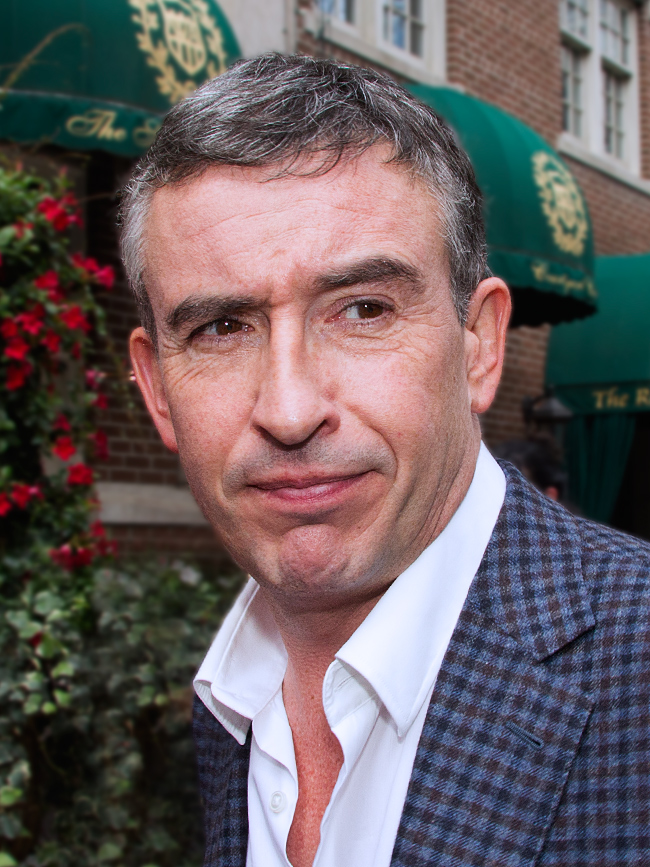
Steve Coogan, Best Adapted Screenplay co-winner

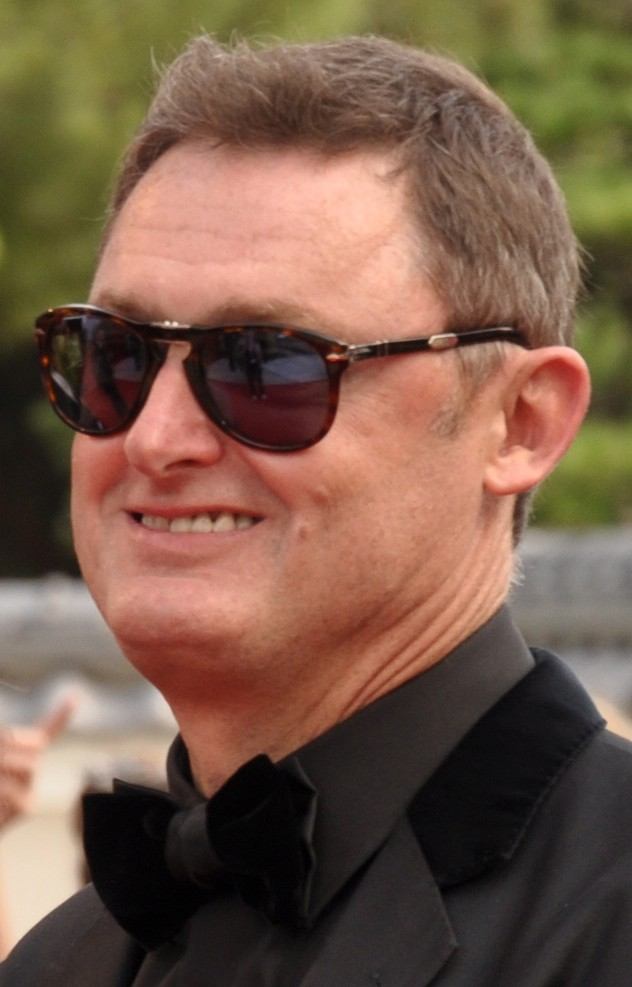
Jeff Pope, Best Adapted Screenplay co-winner

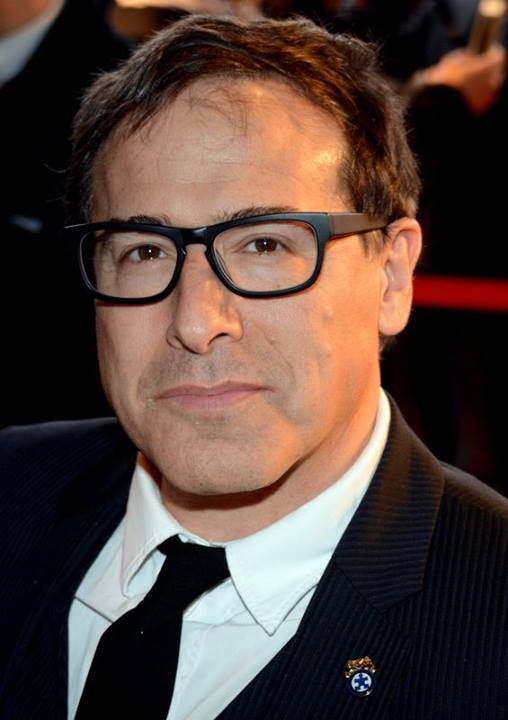
David O. Russell, Best Original Screenplay co-winner

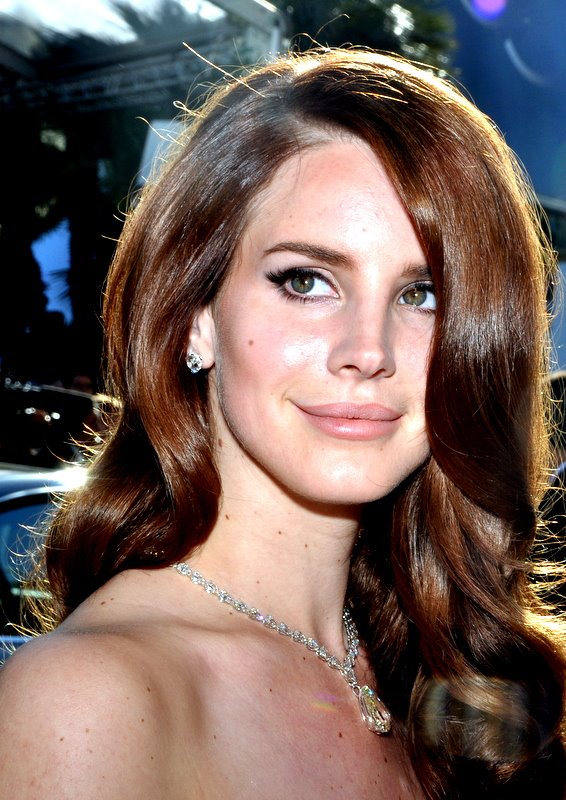
Lana Del Rey, Best Original Song co-winner

Winners are listed first and highlighted in bold.

Best Film	Best Director
**12 Years a Slave**; All Is Lost; American Hustle; Blue Jasmine; Captain Phillips; Gravity; Inside Llewyn Davis; Philomena; Saving Mr. Banks; The Wolf of Wall Street	**Steve McQueen – 12 Years a Slave**; Joel Coen and Ethan Coen – Inside Llewyn Davis; Alfonso Cuarón – Gravity; Paul Greengrass – Captain Phillips; Ron Howard – Rush; David O. Russell – American Hustle; Martin Scorsese – The Wolf of Wall Street; Woody Allen – Blue Jasmine
Best Actor	Best Actress
**Matthew McConaughey – Dallas Buyers Club as Ron Woodroof**; Christian Bale – American Hustle as Irving Rosenfeld; Bruce Dern – Nebraska as Woodrow "Woody" Grant; Leonardo DiCaprio – The Wolf of Wall Street as Jordan Belfort; Chiwetel Ejiofor – 12 Years a Slave as Solomon Northup; Tom Hanks – Captain Phillips as Captain Richard Phillips; Robert Redford – All Is Lost as Our Man; Forest Whitaker – The Butler as Cecil Gaines	**Cate Blanchett – Blue Jasmine as Jeanette "Jasmine" Francis**; Amy Adams – American Hustle as Sydney Prosser; Sandra Bullock – Gravity as Dr. Ryan Stone; Judi Dench – Philomena as Philomena Lee; Adèle Exarchopoulos – Blue Is the Warmest Colour as Adèle; Julia Louis-Dreyfus – Enough Said as Eva; Meryl Streep – August: Osage County as Violet Watson; Emma Thompson – Saving Mr. Banks as P.L. Travers
Best Supporting Actor	Best Supporting Actress
**Jared Leto – Dallas Buyers Club as Rayon**; Casey Affleck – Out of the Furnace as Rodney Baze; Bradley Cooper – American Hustle as Richie DiMaso; Michael Fassbender – 12 Years a Slave as Edwin Epps; Harrison Ford – 42 as Branch Rickey; Ryan Gosling – The Place Beyond the Pines as Luke Glanton; Jake Gyllenhaal – Prisoners as Detective Loki; Tom Hanks – Saving Mr. Banks as Walt Disney	**June Squibb – Nebraska as Kate Grant**; Sally Hawkins – Blue Jasmine as Ginger; Jennifer Lawrence – American Hustle as Rosalyn Rosenfeld; Lupita Nyong'o – 12 Years a Slave as Patsey; Julia Roberts – August: Osage County as Barbara Weston-Fordham; Léa Seydoux – Blue Is the Warmest Colour as Emma; Emily Watson – The Book Thief as Rosa Hubermann; Oprah Winfrey – The Butler as Gloria Gaines
Best Original Screenplay	Best Adapted Screenplay
**American Hustle – Eric Warren Singer and David O. Russell**; Blue Jasmine – Woody Allen; Enough Said – Nicole Holofcener; Her – Spike Jonze; Inside Llewyn Davis – Joel Coen and Ethan Coen; Saving Mr. Banks – Kelly Marcel and Sue Smith	**Philomena – Steve Coogan and Jeff Pope**; 12 Years a Slave – John Ridley; Before Midnight – Ethan Hawke, Julie Delpy, and Richard Linklater; Captain Phillips – Billy Ray; Lone Survivor – Peter Berg; The Wolf of Wall Street – Terence Winter
Best Animated or Mixed Media Film	Best Foreign Language Film
**The Wind Rises**; Cloudy with a Chance of Meatballs 2; The Croods; Epic; Ernest & Celestine; Frozen; Monsters University; Turbo	**The Broken Circle Breakdown (Belgium)**; Bethlehem (Israel); Blue Is the Warmest Colour (France); Circles (Serbia); Four Corners (South Africa); The Great Beauty (Italy); The Hunt (Denmark); Metro Manila (United Kingdom); The Past (Iran); Wadjda (Saudi Arabia)
Best Documentary Film	Best Cinematography
**Blackfish**; 20 Feet from Stardom; The Act of Killing; After Tiller; American Promise; Évocateur: The Morton Downey Jr. Movie; Sound City; The Square; Stories We Tell; Tim's Vermeer	**Inside Llewyn Davis – Bruno Delbonnel**; 12 Years a Slave – Sean Bobbitt; Gravity – Emmanuel Lubezki; Prisoners – Roger Deakins; Rush – Anthony Dod Mantle; The Secret Life of Walter Mitty – Stuart Dryburgh
Best Original Score	Best Original Song
**Gravity – Steven Price**; 12 Years a Slave – Hans Zimmer; The Book Thief – John Williams; Her – Arcade Fire; Philomena – Alexandre Desplat; The Secret Life of Walter Mitty – Theodore Shapiro	**"Young and Beautiful" – The Great Gatsby**; "Happy" – Despicable Me 2; "I See Fire" – The Hobbit: The Desolation of Smaug; "Let It Go" – Frozen; "Please Mr. Kennedy" – Inside Llewyn Davis; "So You Know What It's Like" – Short Term 12
Best Visual Effects	Best Art Direction and Production Design
**Gravity**; All Is Lost; The Croods; Oz the Great and Powerful; Rush; World War Z	**The Great Gatsby**; The Butler; The Invisible Woman; Oz the Great and Powerful; Rush; Saving Mr. Banks
Best Film Editing	Best Sound (Editing and Mixing)
**American Hustle**; 12 Years a Slave; Gravity; Prisoners; Rush; The Wolf of Wall Street	**Gravity**; All Is Lost; Captain Phillips; Elysium; Inside Llewyn Davis; Rush
Best Costume Design	Best Ensemble – Motion Picture
**The Invisible Woman**; 12 Years a Slave; The Great Gatsby; Oz the Great and Powerful; Rush; Saving Mr. Banks	**Nebraska – Bruce Dern, Will Forte, Rance Howard, Stacy Keach,** **Angela McEwan, Bob Odenkirk, Devin Ratray, Melinda Simonsen,** **June Squibb, Roger Stuckwisch, and Mary Louise Wilson**

== Television winners and nominees ==
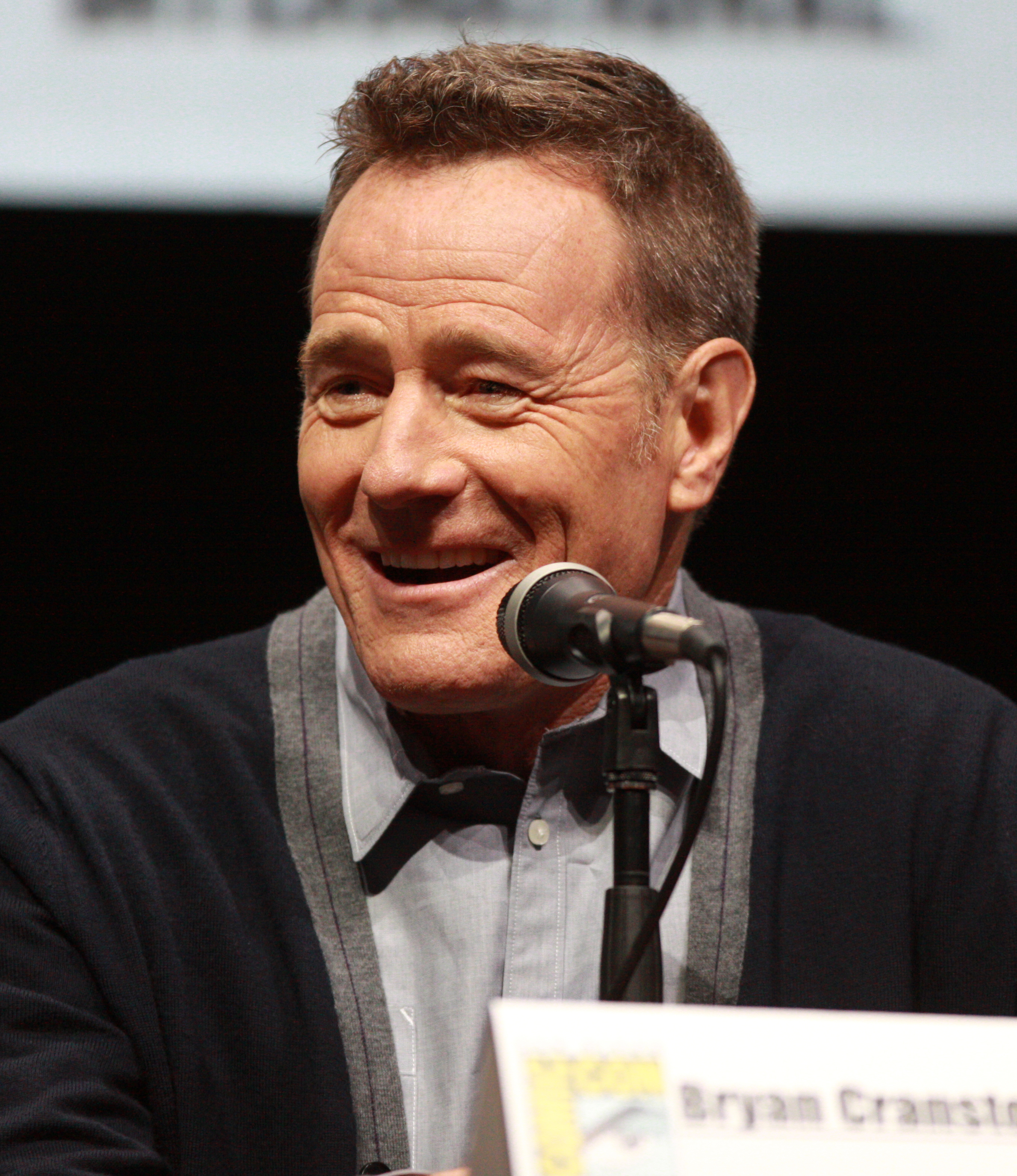
Bryan Cranston, Best Actor in a Drama Series winner

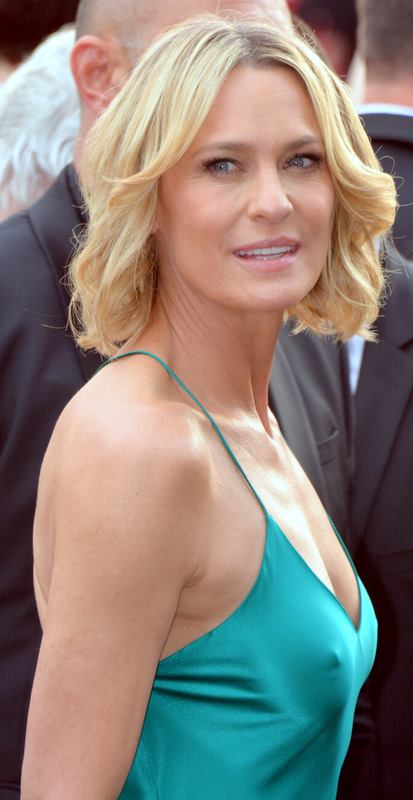
Robin Wright, Best Actress in a Drama Series winner

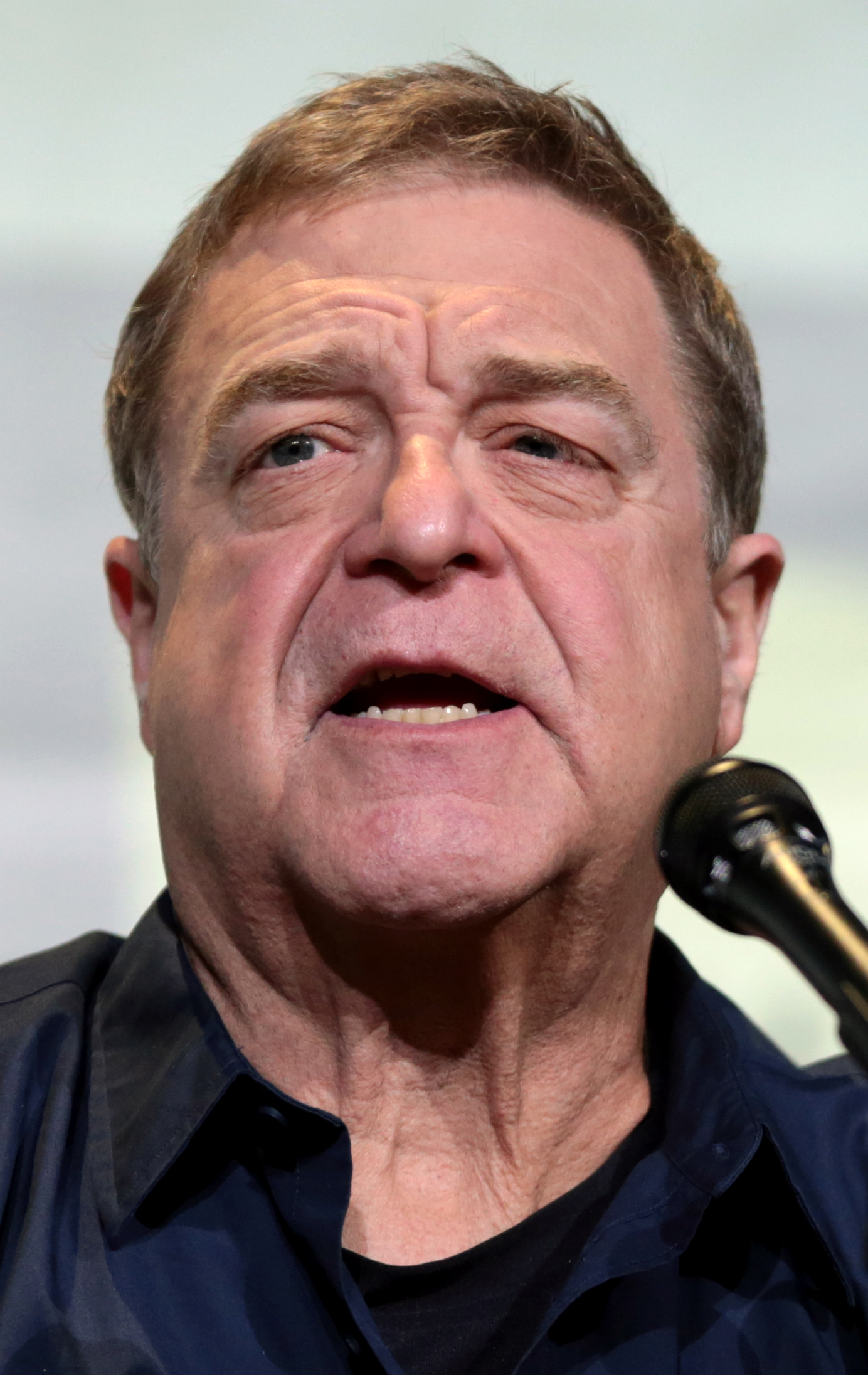
John Goodman, Best Actor in a Comedy or Musical Series winner

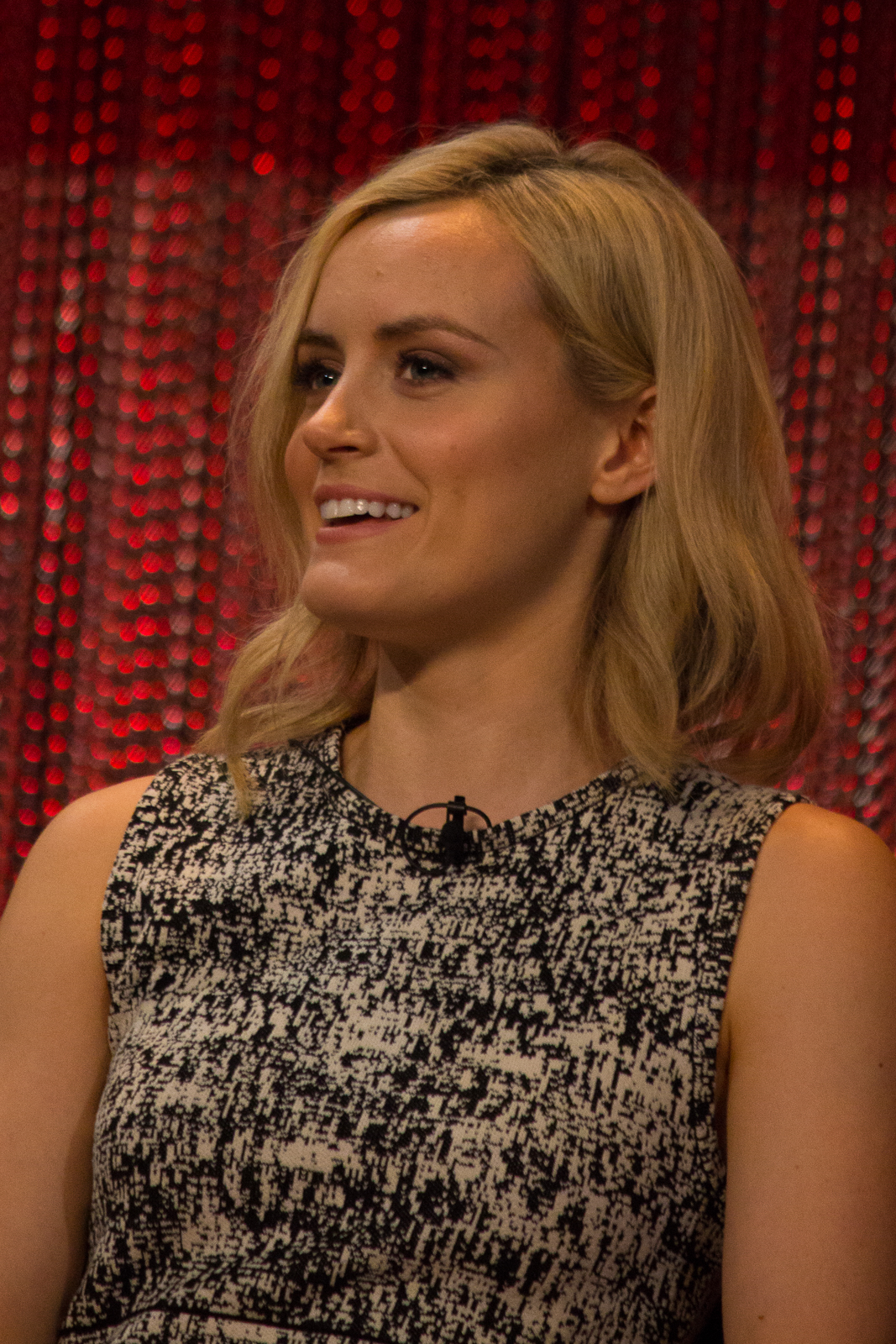
Taylor Schilling, Best Actress in a Comedy or Musical Series winner

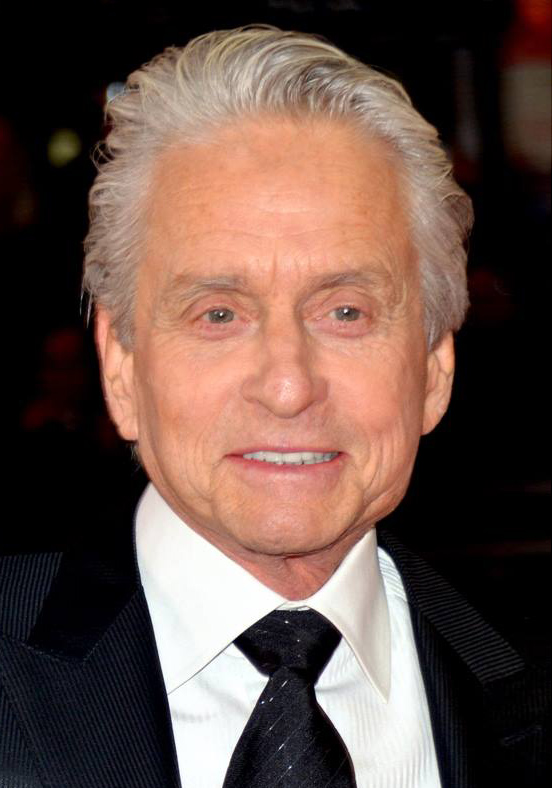
Michael Douglas, Best Actor in a Miniseries or Television Film winner

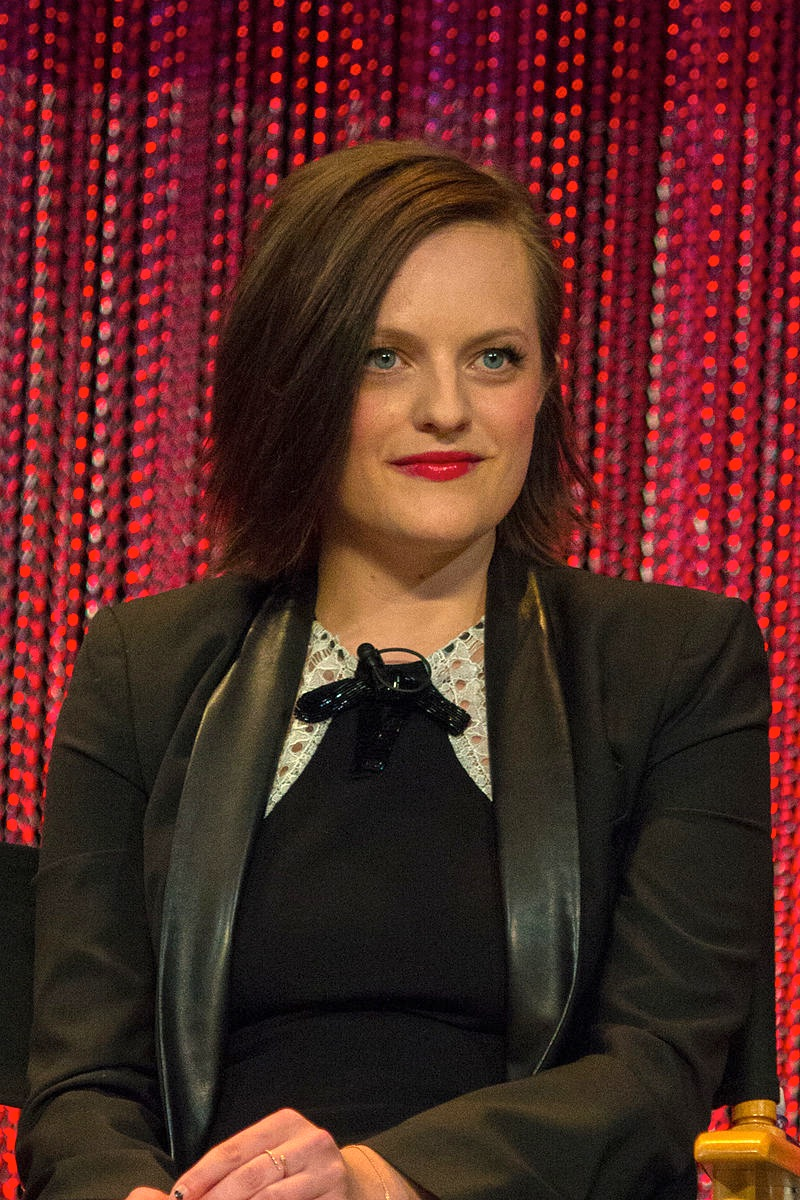
Elisabeth Moss, Best Actress in a Miniseries or Television Film winner

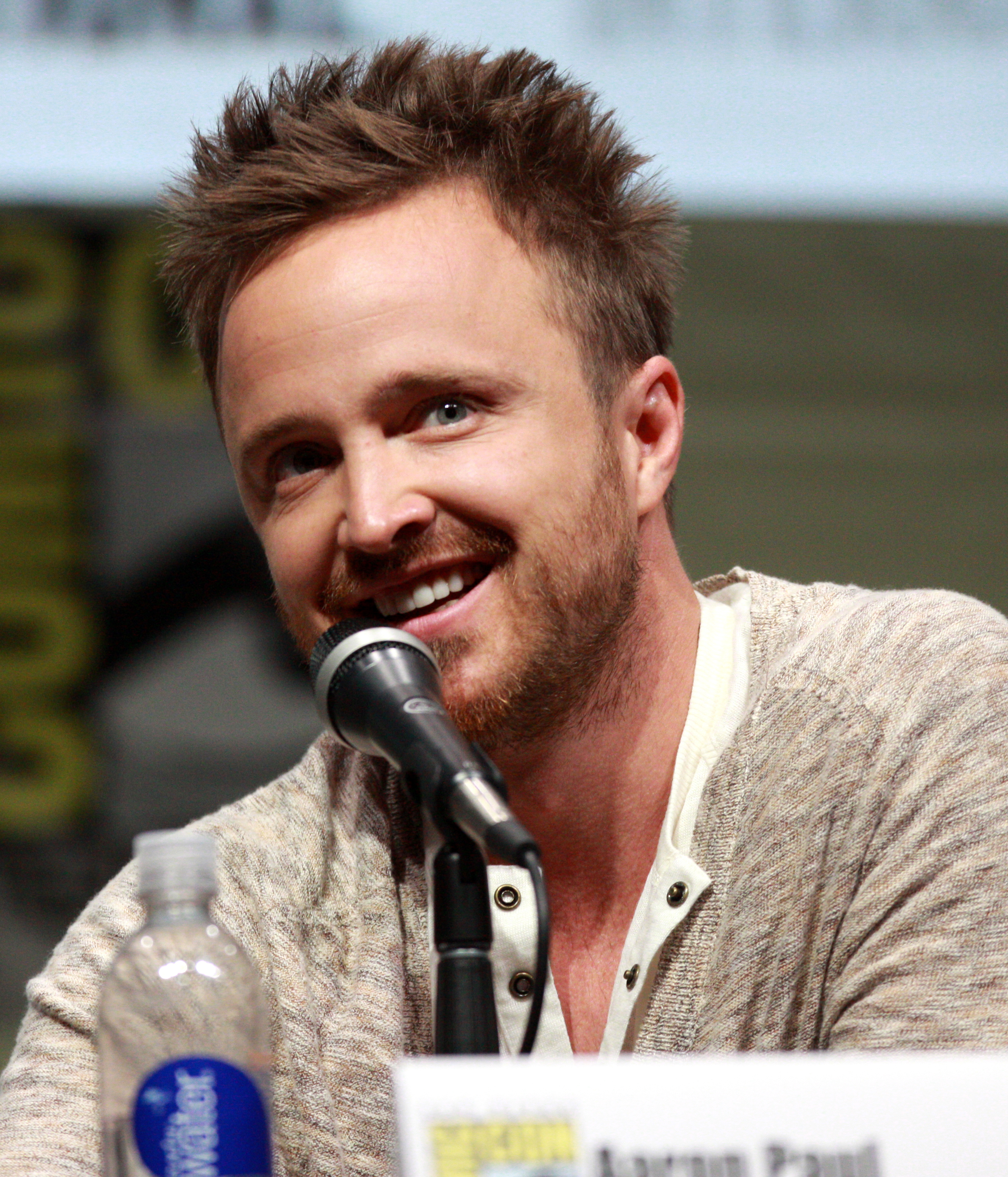
Aaron Paul, Best Supporting Actor in a Series, Miniseries, or Television Film winner

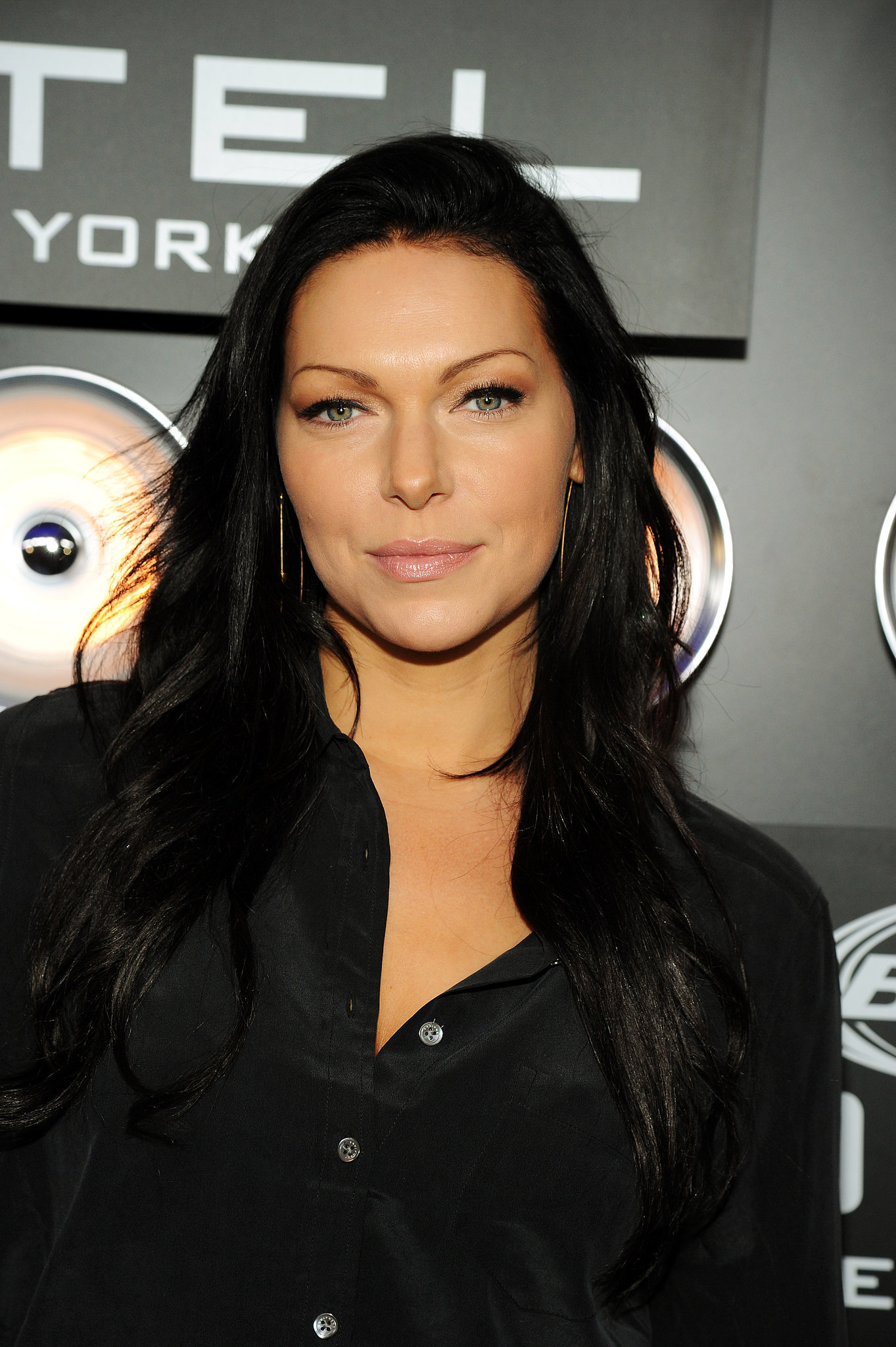
Laura Prepon, Best Supporting Actress in a Series, Miniseries, or Television Film winner

Winners are listed first and highlighted in bold.

Best Drama Series	Best Musical or Comedy Series
**Breaking Bad – AMC**; The Americans – FX; Downton Abbey – PBS; The Good Wife – CBS; Homeland – Showtime; House of Cards – Netflix; Last Tango in Halifax – BBC One / PBS; Mad Men – AMC; Masters of Sex – Showtime; Rectify – Sundance Channel	**Orange Is the New Black – Netflix**; Alpha House – Amazon Studios; The Big Bang Theory – CBS; Brooklyn Nine-Nine – Fox; Enlightened – HBO; Modern Family – ABC; Veep – HBO; The Wrong Mans – BBC Two / Hulu; A Young Doctor's Notebook – Sky Arts
Best Miniseries or TV Film	Best Genre Series
**Dancing on the Edge – Starz**; Behind the Candelabra – HBO; The Big C: Hereafter – Showtime; Burton & Taylor – BBC America; Generation War – ZDF; Mob City – TNT; Parade's End – HBO; Phil Spector – HBO; Top of the Lake – Sundance Channel; The White Queen – Starz	**Game of Thrones – HBO**; American Horror Story: Coven – FX; Arrow – The CW; Grimm – NBC; Agents of S.H.I.E.L.D. – ABC; Once Upon a Time – ABC; Orphan Black – Space; The Returned – Sundance Channel; Supernatural – The CW; The Walking Dead – AMC
Best Actor in a Drama Series	Best Actress in a Drama Series
**Bryan Cranston – Breaking Bad as Walter White**; Jeff Daniels – The Newsroom as Will McAvoy; Jon Hamm – Mad Men as Don Draper; Freddie Highmore – Bates Motel as Norman Bates; Derek Jacobi – Last Tango in Halifax as Alan Buttershaw; Michael Sheen – Masters of Sex as Dr. William H. Masters; Kevin Spacey – House of Cards as Frank Underwood; Aden Young – Rectify as Daniel Holden	**Robin Wright – House of Cards as Claire Underwood**; Lizzy Caplan – Masters of Sex as Virginia E. Johnson; Olivia Colman – Broadchurch as Detective Sergeant Ellie Miller; Vera Farmiga – Bates Motel as Norma Louise Bates; Tatiana Maslany – Orphan Black as Various Characters; Anne Reid – Last Tango in Halifax as Celia Dawson; Keri Russell – The Americans as Elizabeth Jennings; Abigail Spencer – Rectify as Amantha Holden
Best Actor in a Musical or Comedy Series	Best Actress in a Musical or Comedy Series
**John Goodman – Alpha House as Senator Gil John Biggs**; Mathew Baynton – The Wrong Mans as Sam Pinkett; Andre Braugher – Brooklyn Nine-Nine as Captain Ray Holt; Don Cheadle – House of Lies as Marty Kaan; James Corden – The Wrong Mans as Phil Bourne; Jake Johnson – New Girl as Nick Miller; Jim Parsons – The Big Bang Theory as Dr. Sheldon Cooper	**Taylor Schilling – Orange Is the New Black as Piper Chapman**; Laura Dern – Enlightened as Amy Jellicoe; Zooey Deschanel – New Girl as Jessica "Jess" Day; Lena Dunham – Girls as Hannah Horvath; Edie Falco – Nurse Jackie as Jackie Payton, RN; Julia Louis-Dreyfus – Veep as Vice President Selina Meyer; Amy Poehler – Parks and Recreation as Leslie Knope; Jessica Walter – Arrested Development as Lucille Bluth
Best Actor in a Miniseries or TV Film	Best Actress in a Miniseries or TV Film
**Michael Douglas – Behind the Candelabra as Liberace**; Matt Damon – Behind the Candelabra as Scott Thorson; Benedict Cumberbatch – Parade's End as Christopher Tietjens; Chiwetel Ejiofor – Dancing on the Edge as Louis Lester; Matthew Goode – Dancing on the Edge as Stanley Mitchell; Peter Mullan – Top of the Lake as Matt Mitcham; Al Pacino – Phil Spector as Phil Spector; Dominic West – Burton & Taylor as Richard Burton	**Elisabeth Moss – Top of the Lake as Det. Robin Griffin**; Helena Bonham Carter – Burton & Taylor as Elizabeth Taylor; Holliday Grainger – Bonnie and Clyde as Bonnie Parker; Rebecca Hall – Parade's End as Sylvia Tietjens; Jessica Lange – American Horror Story: Coven as Fiona Goode; Melissa Leo – Call Me Crazy: A Five Film as Robin; Helen Mirren – Phil Spector as Linda Kenney Baden; Sarah Paulson – American Horror Story: Coven as Cordelia Foxx
Best Supporting Actor in a Series, Miniseries or TV Film	Best Supporting Actress in a Series, Miniseries or TV Film
**Aaron Paul – Breaking Bad as Jesse Pinkman**; Nikolaj Coster-Waldau – Game of Thrones as Jaime Lannister; William Hurt – Bonnie and Clyde: Dead and Alive as Frank Hamer; Peter Sarsgaard – The Killing as Ray Seward; Jimmy Smits – Sons of Anarchy as Nero Padilla; Corey Stoll – House of Cards as Peter Russo; Jon Voight – Ray Donovan as Mickey Donovan; James Wolk – Mad Men as Bob Benson	**Laura Prepon – Orange Is the New Black as Alex Vause**; Uzo Aduba – Orange Is the New Black as Suzanne "Crazy Eyes" Warren; Kathy Bates – American Horror Story: Coven as Delphine LaLaurie; Emilia Clarke – Game of Thrones as Daenerys Targaryen; Anna Gunn – Breaking Bad as Skyler White; Margo Martindale – The Americans as Claudia; Judy Parfitt – Call the Midwife as Sister Monica Joan; Merritt Wever – Nurse Jackie as Zoey Barkow, RN
Best Ensemble – Television Series	Best Original Short-Format Program
**Orange Is the New Black – Jason Biggs, Michael J. Harney,** **Michelle Hurst, Kate Mulgrew, Laura Prepon, and Taylor Schilling**	**JustSaying – Tuna Fish Studio**; Ask A Slave – AzieDee Productions; Blue – WIGS; Burning Love – Abominable Pictures / Paramount Insurge / Red Hour Films / Yahoo! Screen; EastSiders – Logo TV; Ghost Ghirls – Electric Dynamite / Shine America / Yahoo! Screen; High Maintenance – Janky Clown Productions; Little Horribles – Barnacle Studious

== New Media winners and nominees ==
Outstanding Overall Blu-ray/DVD	Outstanding Youth Blu-ray/DVD
Star Trek Into Darkness (Paramount Home Entertainment); Les Misérables (Universal Studios Home Entertainment); The Wizard of Oz: 75th Anniversary Collector's Edition (Warner Home Video); Waiting for Lightning (First Run Features); Breaking Bad: The Complete Series (Sony Pictures Home Entertainment); JFK: 50th Anniversary Ultimate Collector's Edition (Warner Home Video); To Be or Not To Be (United Artists); Love Actually: 10th Anniversary Edition (Universal Studios Home Entertainment); The Talented Mr. Ripley (Miramax Films); Argo (Warner Home Video)	Rise of the Guardians (Paramount Home Entertainment / DreamWorks Animation Home Entertainment); Planes (Walt Disney Studios Home Entertainment); Monsters University: Collector's Edition (Walt Disney Studios Home Entertainment); The Smurfs 2 (Sony Pictures Home Entertainment); The Croods (20th Century Fox Home Entertainment / DreamWorks Animation Home Entertainment); The Muppet Movie (Walt Disney Studios Home Entertainment)
Outstanding Platform Action/Adventure Game	Outstanding Mobile Game
Battlefield 4 (EA Digital Illusions CE); Beyond: Two Souls (Quantic Dream); BioShock Infinite (Irrational Games); Crysis 3 (Crytek); Grand Theft Auto V (Rockstar North)	Badland (Frogmind); XCOM: Enemy Unknown for iOS (Feral Interactive / Firaxis Games); Warhammer Quest (Rodeo Games); The Room (Fireproof Games); Ridiculous Fishing (Vlambeer)
Outstanding Role Playing Game	Outstanding Sports/Racing Game
Ni no Kuni: Wrath of the White Witch (Level-5 / Studio Ghibli); Tales of Xillia (Namco Tales Studio); Final Fantasy XIV: A Realm Reborn (Square Enix); Sacred 3 (Keen Games); The Elder Scrolls V: Skyrim (Bethesda Game Studios)	Need for Speed Rivals (Electronic Arts / Ghost Games); NBA 2K14 (Visual Concepts); Grid 2 (Codemasters Southam); Forza Motorsport 5 (Turn 10 Studios); FIFA 14 (EA Canada)

== Awards breakdown ==
=== Film ===
Winners:

3 / 8 Gravity: Best Original Score / Best Sound (Editing and Mixing) / Best Visual Effects
2 / 2 Dallas Buyers Club: Best Actor / Best Supporting Actor
2 / 3 The Great Gatsby: Best Art Direction and Production Design / Best Original Song
2 / 3 Nebraska: Best Supporting Actress / Best Ensemble – Motion Picture
2 / 8 American Hustle: Best Original Screenplay / Best Film Editing
2 / 10 12 Years a Slave: Best Director / Best Film
1 / 1 Blackfish: Best Documentary Film
1 / 1 The Broken Circle Breakdown: Best Foreign Language Film
1 / 1 The Wind Rises: Best Animated or Mixed Media Film
1 / 2 The Invisible Woman: Best Costume Design
1 / 4 Philomena: Best Adapted Screenplay
1 / 5 Blue Jasmine: Best Actress
1 / 6 Inside Llewyn Davis: Best Cinematography

Losers:

0 / 7 Rush
0 / 6 Saving Mr. Banks
0 / 5 Captain Phillips, The Wolf of Wall Street
0 / 4 All Is Lost
0 / 3 Blue Is the Warmest Colour, The Butler, Oz the Great and Powerful, Prisoners
0 / 2 August: Osage County, The Book Thief, The Croods, Enough Said, Frozen, Her, The Secret Life of Walter Mitty

=== Television ===
Winners:

4 / 5 Orange Is the New Black: Best Actress in a Musical or Comedy Series / Best Musical or Comedy Series / Best Supporting Actress in a Series, Miniseries or TV Film
3 / 4 Breaking Bad: Best Actor in a Drama Series / Best Drama Series / Best Supporting Actor in a Series, Miniseries or TV Film
1 / 2 Alpha House: Best Actor in a Musical or Comedy Series
1 / 3 Behind the Candelabra: Best Actor in a Miniseries or TV Film
1 / 3 Dancing on the Edge: Best Miniseries or TV Film
1 / 3 Game of Thrones: Best Genre Series
1 / 3 Top of the Lake: Best Actress in a Miniseries or TV Film
1 / 4 House of Cards: Best Actress in a Drama Series

Losers:

0 / 4 American Horror Story: Coven
0 / 3 The Americans, Burton & Taylor, Last Tango in Halifax, Mad Men, Masters of Sex, Parade's End, Phil Spector, Rectify, The Wrong Mans
0 / 2 Bates Motel, The Big Bang Theory, Bonnie and Clyde, Brooklyn Nine-Nine, Enlightened, New Girl, Nurse Jackie, Orphan Black, Veep
