= Just Saying (disambiguation) =

"Just Sayin'" is a 2016 song by James Barker Band.

Just Saying or Just Sayin' may also refer to:

- Just Sayin', an album by Buddy Brown
- "Just Sayin'", a song by Amerie from After 4AM
- "Just Saying", a song by Comethazine from Bawskee 3.5
- "Just Saying", a song by Jamie xx from In Colour

== See also ==
- #JustSaying, a web series
