= Dragan Radenović =

Serbian sculptor

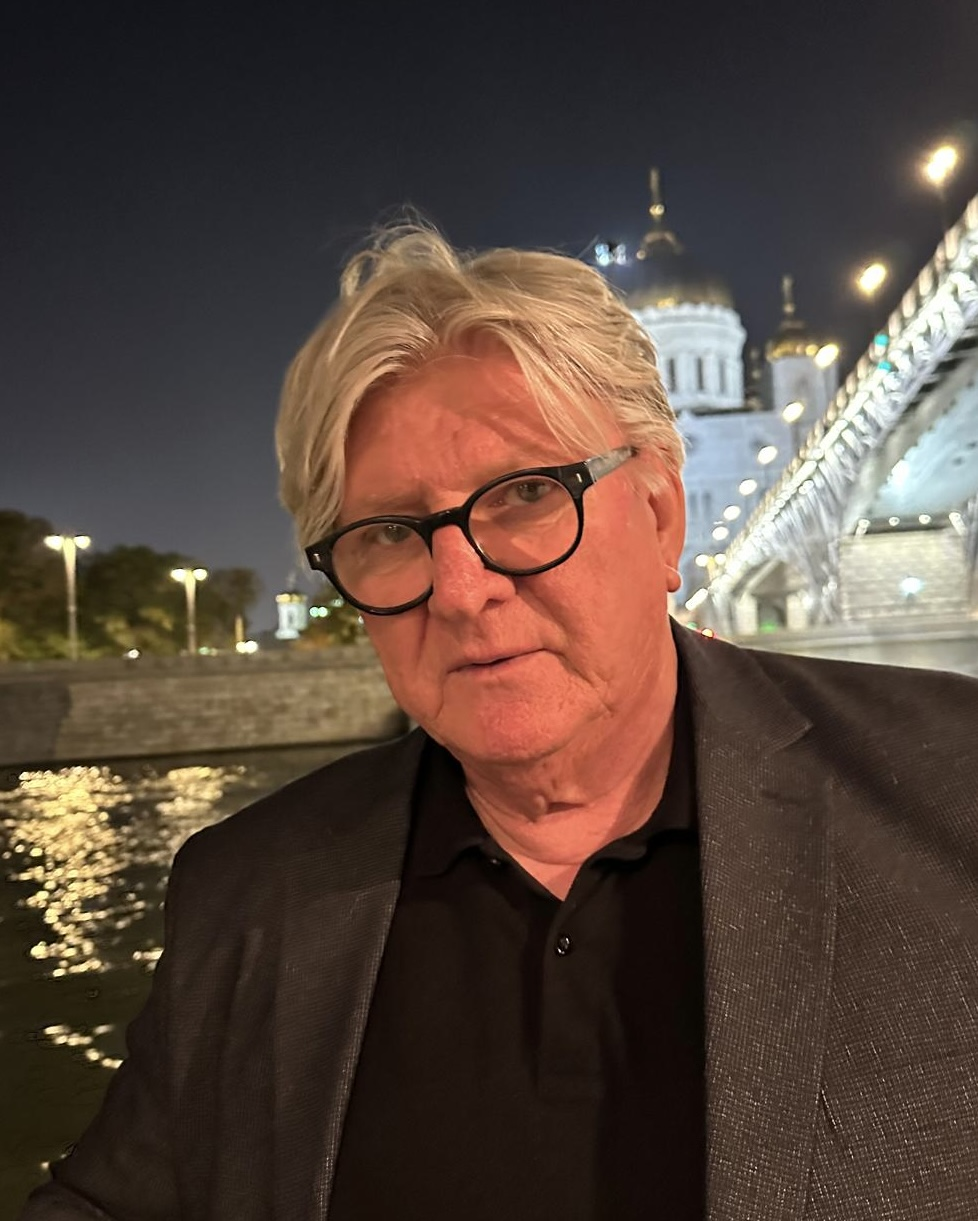
- Born: 12 April 1951 (age 75); Sarajevo, FNRY
- Education: University of Arts in Belgrade
- Known for: Sculptor
- Children: Two daughters
- Parents: Radivoje Radenović (father); Ranđija Radenović (mother)

Dragan Radenović (Serbian Cyrillic: Драган Раденовић, Sarajevo, FNRY, April 12, 1951) is a Serbian artist, university professor, and academician.

== Biography ==
=== Early life ===
He was born with his father Radivoje Radenović, a Yugoslav People's Army officer, and his mother Ranđija, born Maksimović. Later, the couple had two daughters and a son.

=== Education ===
Dragan Radenović is a law graduate. He also graduated from the Sculpture Department of the Faculty of Applied Arts in Belgrade in 1982. He has a master's degree in art and a doctorate in philosophy.

=== Achievements ===
Radenović has provided the most contributions in the field of art, art pedagogy, and art theory. His sculptures are in world museums and private collections. He is the author of sculptures for two important annual awards in Hollywood, California: the Mary Pickford Award and Nikola Tesla Award.

He has exhibited in dozens of solo exhibitions and several hundred collective exhibitions in the country and abroad. He has won several artistic achievements and contributions to the development of art theory. The studio and sculpture park of the sculptor is located on Ciganski Brdo above Grocka, near Belgrade.

As a professor of art academies, he teaches basic sculpture discipline – modeling and the theory of the language of visual communication. He is a member of many artistic and scientific international organizations. He has been a member of the Association of Fine Artists of Serbia since 1980 and a member and founder of YUSTAT. He is a member of the Associated American Artists, the Sculpture Guild, and the International Association of Fine Artists at the United Nations.

He was the Secretary of the Department of Logistics and Systems at the Center for Multidisciplinary Studies of the University of Belgrade in 1979.

He is a member of the Russian Academy of Arts, which was founded in 1757 by Empress Catherine the Great as the Imperial Academy of Arts. Currently, this academy is the oldest institution of said empress in the world.

== Selected theoretical works ==
=== Monographs ===
- Petrović, Radmilo; Radenović, Dragan (2008): Kulturno nasleđe islama. Beograd: Atelje Vizantija.
- Petrović, Radmilo; Radenović, Dragan (2010): Dizajn i savremena umetnost. Beograd: Metaphysica.

=== Essays ===
- Radenović, Dragan; (2018): Modernizam i postmodernizam. In: Lukić, Aleksandar (ur.): Filozofija etosa : spomenica Simu Elakoviću. Beograd: Srpsko filozofsko društvo, pp. 218–221.
- Radenović, Dragan (2018): Fašizam, granica — zapad : rasprava o savremenom fašizmu. In: Filozofija i sloboda. Beograd : Srpsko filozofsko društvo, pp. 211–219.

== Selected exhibition catalogs ==
- Radenović, Dragan (2007): Dragan Radenović : raspeća : = crocifissioni. Beograd: R. Petrović; Ministarstvo kulture Srbije.
- Radenović, Dragan (2008): Radenović : skulpture : Moderna galerija, Lazarevac, jun 2008. Lazarevac: Centar za kulturu.
- Radenović, Dragan (2009): Dragan Radenović : evo čoveka : izložba, Kragujevac, 2009. Beograd: Grafolik.
- Radenović, Dragan (2010): Vystavka „Ce, čelovek - Ecce homo : Imperatorskaya akademiya hudožestv, Moskva”, 2010. Beograd: Grafolik.
- Radenović, Dragan (2012): Radenović : Skulptura / sculpture : Čovek u savremenom svetu / Man in a contemporary world : Ozone, 30. april – 6. maj 2012. Beograd: Ozone.
- Radenović, Dragan; Mileusnić, Dragan; Živković, Miodrag (2014): Živković, Mileusnić, Radenović : tri : Nacionalna galerija, Beograd, 17. jun-17. jul 2014. god. Uredio Gorča Stamenković. Beograd: D. Radenović.
