= Satellite Auteur Award =

Annual film award

The Auteur Award is an honorary Satellite Award bestowed by the International Press Academy to recognize the "individual voices of filmmakers and their personal impact on the industry." It was first presented on December 17, 2005, at the 10th Annual Satellite Awards ceremony to George Clooney.

The trophy awarded to the honorees resembles the normal Satellite Award but is designated for Special Achievement, with the recipient's name and year engraved on the base. It was designed by Dalmatian sculptor Ante Marinović.

== Honorees ==
=== Auteur Award ===
Year	Recipient	Reason
2005	George Clooney	For his work on the film Good Night, and Good Luck and his "promising filmmaking future"
2006	Robert Altman	For his visionary work as a filmmaker
2007	Julian Schnabel	For his work on the film The Diving Bell and the Butterfly (Le scaphandre et le papillon)
2008	Baz Luhrmann	For his signature scope and style of filmmaking
2009	Roger Corman	For his trademark style of imaginative special effects and plots
2010	Alex Gibney	For his work as a documentary film director and producer
2011	Peter Bogdanovich	For his body of film work, as well as his books on the inner workings of filmmaking and filmmakers
2012	Paul Williams	For having a singular vision and unique artistic control over the elements of production
2013	Guillermo del Toro	For pushing the boundaries of horror, the paranormal and fantasy.
2014	Martyn Burke	For "moving effortlessly between the worlds of novels, documentaries and motion pictures"
2015	Robert M. Young	For his "specific passion for filmmaking"
2016	Tom Ford	For being "an edgy, trend-setting modernist"
2017	Greta Gerwig	For being "a multi-talented writer/actor/director"
2018	Ryan Coogler	For having a "creative vision and unique artistry"
2019	Edward Norton	For his work on the film Motherless Brooklyn
2020	Emerald Fennell	For her work on the film Promising Young Woman
2021	Lin-Manuel Miranda	For singular vision and unique artistic control over the elements of production
2022	Martin McDonagh	For his work on the film The Banshees of Inisherin
2023	Yorgos Lanthimos	For his work on the film Poor Things
2024	F. Javier Gutiérrez	For singular vision and unique artistic control over the elements of production
2025	Michelle Danner	For singular vision and unique artistic control over the elements of production

=== Special Achievement Award ===
Until 2005 the IPA honored outstanding entertainment industry professionals with the Special Achievement Award. The last Special Achievement Award donated to George Clooney "as an Auteur" founded the abovementioned Auteur Award.

Year	Recipient	Reason
1999	Dale Olson	The first publicist to receive an honorary Satellite Award.
2001	Meir Fenigstein	For outstanding devotion & commitment in promoting the best of Israeli films through Israel Film Festival in the United States.
2003	Peter Dinklage	For outstanding talent.
2005	George Clooney	For an "Auteur"
