= Satellite Award for Best Television Series – Drama =

Annual award by the International Press Academy

- Awarded for: Best Television Series – Drama
- Country: United States
- Presented by: International Press Academy
- First award: 1996
- Currently held by: The Last of Us (2023)

The Satellite Award for Best Television Series – Drama is an annual award given by the International Press Academy as one of its Satellite Awards.

== Winners and nominees ==
=== 1990s ===
Year	Winners and nominees	Network
1996	The X-Files	Fox
1996	Chicago Hope	CBS
1996	NYPD Blue	ABC
1996	ER	NBC
1996	Homicide: Life on the Street	NBC
1997	NYPD Blue	ABC
1997	Homicide: Life on the Street	NBC
1997	Law & Order	NBC
1997	The Pretender	NBC
1997	The X-Files	Fox
1998	Oz	HBO
1998	ER	NBC
1998	The Pretender	NBC
1998	NYPD Blue	ABC
1998	The X-Files	Fox
1999	The West Wing	NBC
1999	The Practice	ABC
1999	Law & Order	NBC
1999	Oz	HBO
1999	The Sopranos	HBO

=== 2000s ===
Year	Winners and nominees	Network
2000	The West Wing	NBC
2000	The Fugitive	CBS
2000	Once and Again	ABC
2000	The Practice	ABC
2000	The Sopranos	HBO
2001	24	Fox
2001	The District	CBS
2001	Six Feet Under	HBO
2001	The Sopranos	HBO
2001	The West Wing	NBC
2002	CSI: Crime Scene Investigation	CBS
2002	24	Fox
2002	Alias	ABC
2002	Buffy the Vampire Slayer	UPN
2002	Without a Trace	CBS
2003	The Shield	FX
2003	Boomtown	NBC
2003	Carnivàle	HBO
2003	Law & Order: Special Victims Unit	NBC
2003	Nip/Tuck	FX
2003	Six Feet Under	HBO
2004	Nip/Tuck	FX
2004	Boston Legal	ABC
2004	The L Word	Showtime
2004	Lost	ABC
2004	The Shield	FX
2005	House	Fox
2005	Grey's Anatomy	ABC
2005	Lost	ABC
2005	Nip/Tuck	FX
2005	Rescue Me	FX
2005	Rome	HBO
2006	House	Fox
2006	Dexter	Showtime
2006	Heroes	NBC
2006	24	Fox
2006	Rescue Me	FX
2006	The Wire	HBO
2007	Dexter	Showtime
2007	Brothers & Sisters	ABC
2007	Friday Night Lights	NBC
2007	Grey's Anatomy	ABC
2007	Mad Men	AMC
2007	The Riches	FX
2008	Dexter	Showtime
2008	Brotherhood	Showtime
2008	In Treatment	HBO
2008	Life on Mars	ABC
2008	Mad Men	AMC
2008	Primeval	ITV
2009	Breaking Bad	AMC
2009	Big Love	HBO
2009	In Treatment	HBO
2009	Damages	FX
2009	The Good Wife	CBS
2009	Mad Men	AMC

=== 2010s ===
Year	Winners and nominees	Network(s)
2010	Breaking Bad	AMC
2010	Boardwalk Empire	HBO
2010	Dexter	Showtime
2010	The Tudors	Showtime
2010	Friday Night Lights	NBC / The 101 Network
2010	The Good Wife	CBS
2010	Mad Men	AMC
2011	Justified	FX
2011	Boardwalk Empire	HBO
2011	Breaking Bad	AMC
2011	Friday Night Lights	NBC / The 101 Network
2011	Sons of Anarchy	FX
2011	Treme	HBO
2012	Homeland	Showtime
2012	Breaking Bad	AMC
2012	Downton Abbey	PBS
2012	Game of Thrones	HBO
2012	The Good Wife	CBS
2012	Justified	FX
2012	The Newsroom	HBO
2012	Nashville	ABC
2013	Breaking Bad	AMC
2013	The Americans	FX
2013	Downton Abbey	PBS
2013	The Good Wife	CBS
2013	Homeland	Showtime
2013	House of Cards	Netflix
2013	Last Tango in Halifax	BBC One / PBS
2013	Mad Men	AMC
2013	Masters of Sex	Showtime
2013	Rectify	Sundance Channel
2014	The Knick	Cinemax
2014	The Affair	Showtime
2014	The Fall	BBC Two / Netflix
2014	Fargo	FX
2014	Halt and Catch Fire	AMC
2014	Hannibal	NBC
2014	House of Cards	Netflix
2014	True Detective	HBO
2015	Better Call Saul	AMC
2015	American Crime	ABC
2015	Bloodline	Netflix
2015	Deutschland 83	Sundance TV
2015	Fargo	FX
2015	Mr. Robot	USA Network
2015	Narcos	Netflix
2015	Ray Donovan	Showtime
2016	The Crown	Netflix
2016	The Affair	Showtime
2016	American Crime	ABC
2016	The Americans	FX
2016	Better Call Saul	AMC
2016	The Fall	BBC Two / Netflix
2016	Mr. Robot	USA Network
2016	Poldark	PBS
2017	Vikings	History
2017	13 Reasons Why	Netflix
2017	The Affair	Showtime
2017	The Handmaid's Tale	Hulu
2017	Mindhunter	Netflix
2017	Taboo	FX
2017	This Is Us	NBC
2018	Homecoming	Amazon Prime Video
2018	The Bold Type	Freeform
2018	The Handmaid's Tale	Hulu
2018	Mr. Mercedes	Audience
2018	Succession	HBO
2018	This Is Us	NBC
2019	Succession	HBO
2019	The Affair	Showtime
2019	The Crown	Netflix
2019	Killing Eve	BBC America
2019	Mindhunter	Netflix
2019	Mr. Mercedes	Audience

=== 2020s ===
Year	Winners and nominees	Network
2020	Better Call Saul	AMC
2020	Billions	Showtime
2020	The Crown	Netflix
2020	Killing Eve	BBC America
2020	Ozark	Netflix
2020	P-Valley	Starz
2021	Squid Game	Netflix
2021	American Rust	Showtime
2021	Bosch	Prime Video
2021	The Boys	Prime Video
2021	In Treatment	HBO
2021	Line of Duty	BBC One
2021	Lupin	Netflix
2021	Succession	HBO
2022	Billions	Showtime
2022	1883	Paramount+
2022	The Bear	FX on Hulu
2022	Better Call Saul	AMC
2022	Gentleman Jack	HBO
2022	Heartstopper	Netflix
2022	Julia	HBO
2022	Yellowjackets	Showtime
2023	The Last of Us	HBO
2023	1923	Paramount+
2023	The Crown	Netflix
2023	Godfather of Harlem	MGM+
2023	Succession	HBO
