= Nikola Tesla Satellite Award =

Annual film award

The Nikola Tesla Award is an honorary Satellite Award bestowed by the International Press Academy to recognize the "pioneers of filmmaking technology industry". It was first presented on January 12, 2003, at the 7th Annual Golden Satellite Awards ceremony to George Lucas. Simon Hayes is the latest recipient as of 2024.

The trophy awarded to the honorees is a bust of inventor Nikola Tesla cast in bronze, on a marble base, inscribed for the recipient. It was designed by Sarajevan sculptor Dragan Radenović.

== Honorees ==
Year	Recipient	Reason
2002	George Lucas	For a lifetime of visionary filmmaking achievement and his privately held company, Lucasfilm, continues to expand frontiers in the cinematic arts
2003	James Cameron	For his stand-out effects and 3D lens innovations
2004	Jerry Lewis	For introducing video-assist and video playback techniques, which have become industry standards
2005	Stan Winston	For his special effects contributions to cinema
2006	Richard Donner	For creating special effects on the 1978 film Superman that pre-dated contemporary computer-generated images
2007	Dennis Muren	For his visual effects in films, especially with computer digital rendering and compositing
2008	Rick Baker	For his innovative make-up, prosthetics, and creature effects in films
2009	Roger Deakins	For his creative cinematography in films
2010	Robert A. Harris	For his work as film preservationist and historian
2011	Douglas Trumbull	For his film inventions and entrepreneurial work
2012	Walter Murch	For award-winning sound design and editing in films
2013	Garrett Brown	For visionary achievement in filmmaking technology
2014	Industrial Light & Magic	For setting the standard for visual effects and creating some of the most stunning images in the history of film.
2015	Robert Rutherford and Jonathan Miller (Hive Lighting)	For their energy efficient, full-spectrum, flicker-free plasma lighting systems.
2016	John Toll	For setting a new bar in the future of digital filmmaking.
2017	Robert Legato	For his deft atmospheric command of visual effects.
2018	Kevin Baillie	For visionary achievement in filmmaking technology
2019	Joe Letteri	For visionary achievement in filmmaking technology
2020	Dick Pope	For visionary achievement in filmmaking technology
2021	Joan Collins Carey	For visionary achievement in filmmaking technology
2022	Ryan Tudhope	For visionary achievement in filmmaking technology
2023	Neil Corbould	For visionary achievement in filmmaking technology
2024	Simon Hayes	For visionary achievement in filmmaking technology
