= 22nd Satellite Awards =

US awards ceremony for film and television

- Date: February 11, 2018

Highlights
- Best film: God's Own Country (Independent); Three Billboards Outside Ebbing, Missouri (Major)
- Best television drama: Vikings
- Best television musical/comedy: GLOW
- Best director: Jordan Peele for Get Out

The 22nd Satellite Awards is an award ceremony honoring the year's outstanding performers, films, television shows, home videos and interactive media, presented by the International Press Academy.

The nominations were announced on November 29, 2017. The winners were announced on February 11, 2018.

== Special achievement awards ==
- Auteur Award (for singular vision and unique artistic control over the elements of production) – Greta Gerwig
- Humanitarian Award (for making a difference in the lives of those in the artistic community and beyond) – Stephen Chbosky
- Mary Pickford Award (for outstanding contribution to the entertainment industry) – Dabney Coleman
- Nikola Tesla Award (for visionary achievement in filmmaking technology) – Robert Legato
- Best First Feature – John Carroll Lynch (Lucky)
- Ensemble: Motion Picture – Mudbound
- Ensemble: Television – Poldark

== Motion picture winners and nominees ==
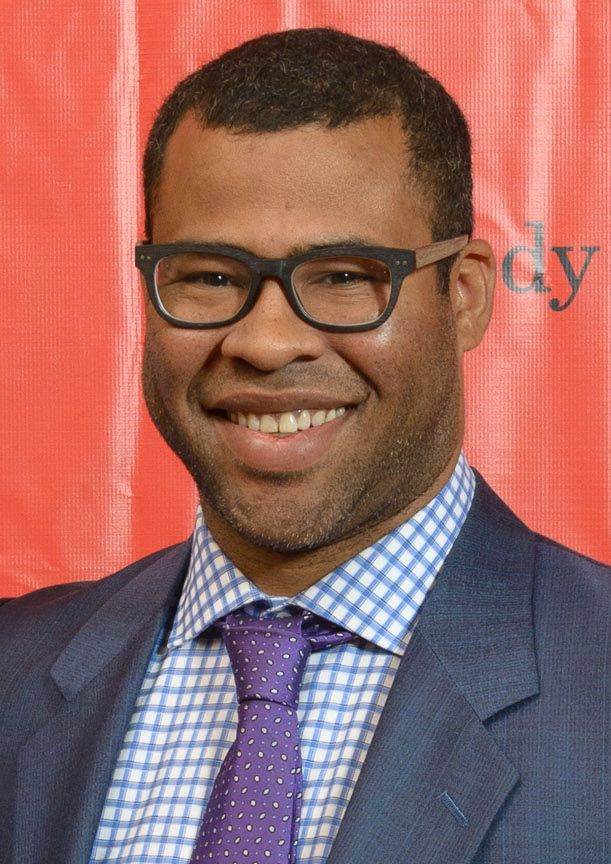
Jordan Peele, Best Director winner

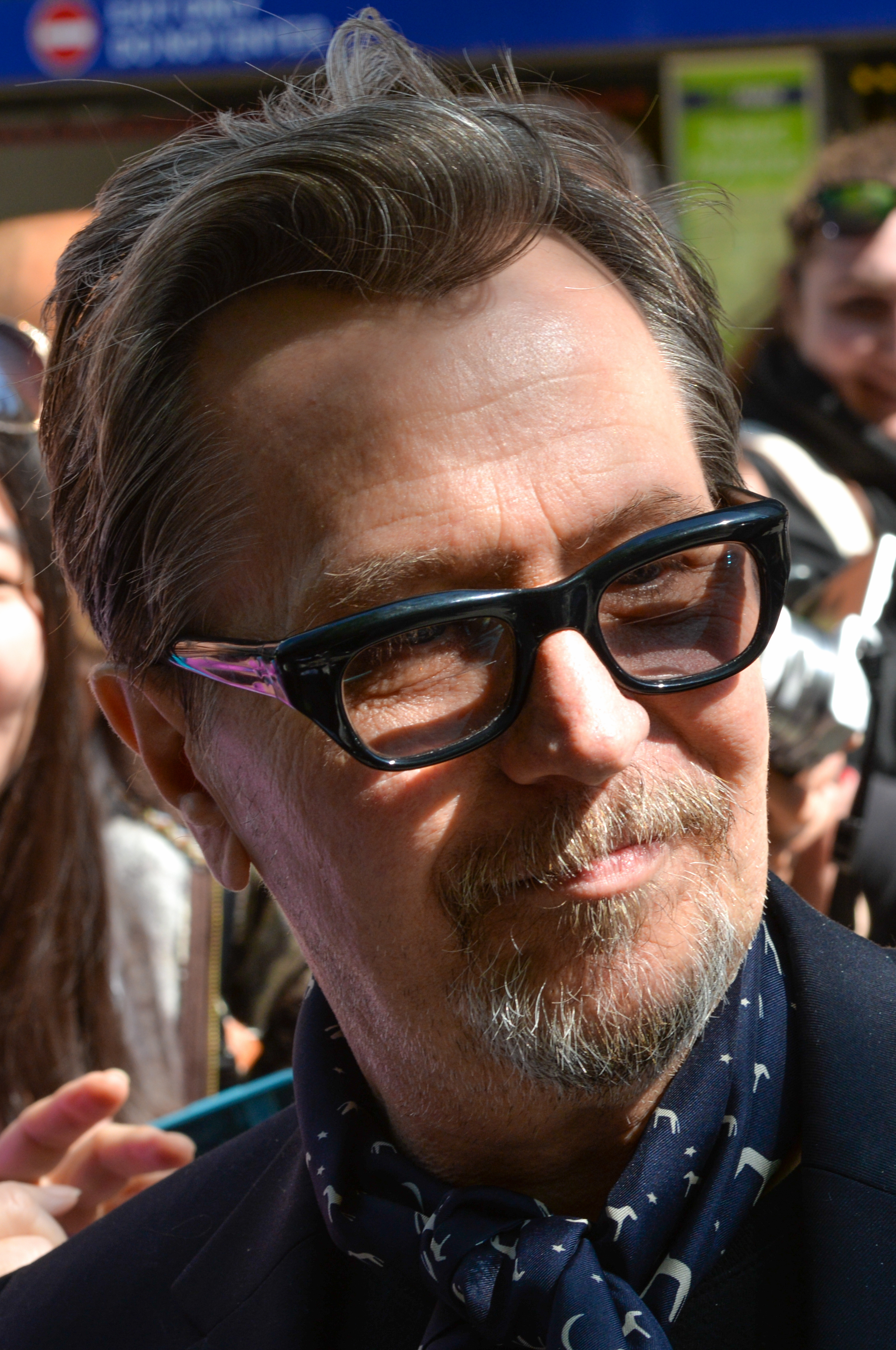
Gary Oldman, Best Actor in a Motion Picture co-winner

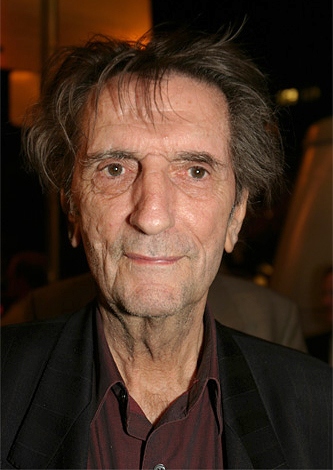
Harry Dean Stanton, Best Actor in a Motion Picture co-winner

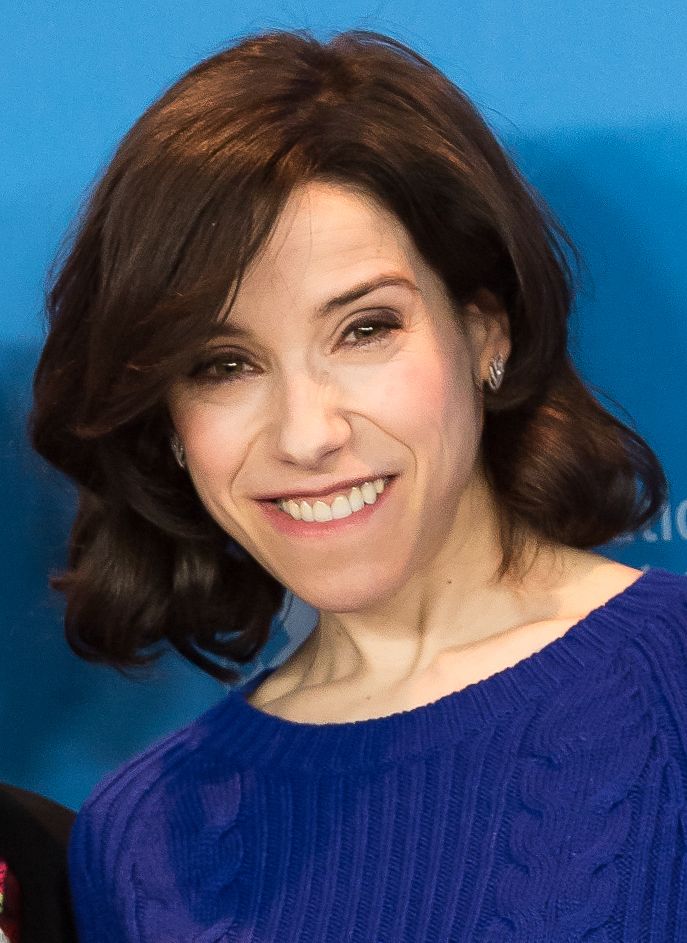
Sally Hawkins, Best Actress in a Motion Picture co-winner

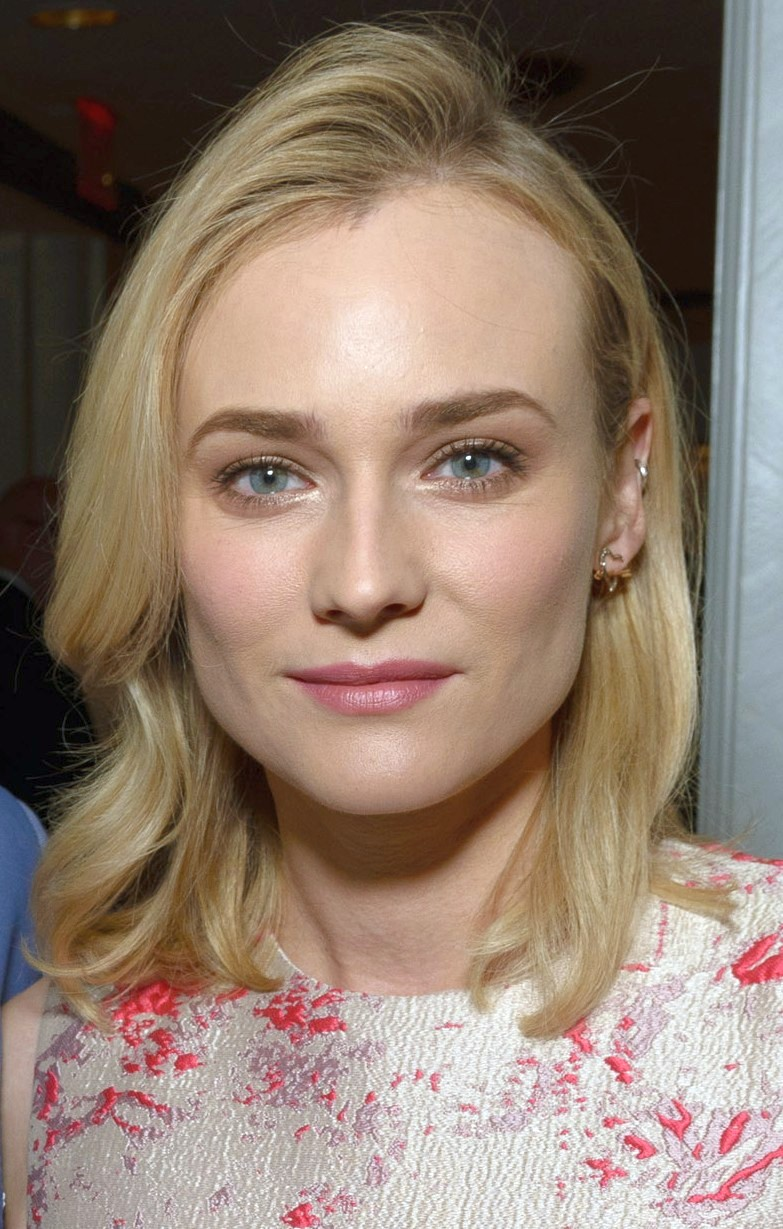
Diane Kruger, Best Actress in a Motion Picture co-winner

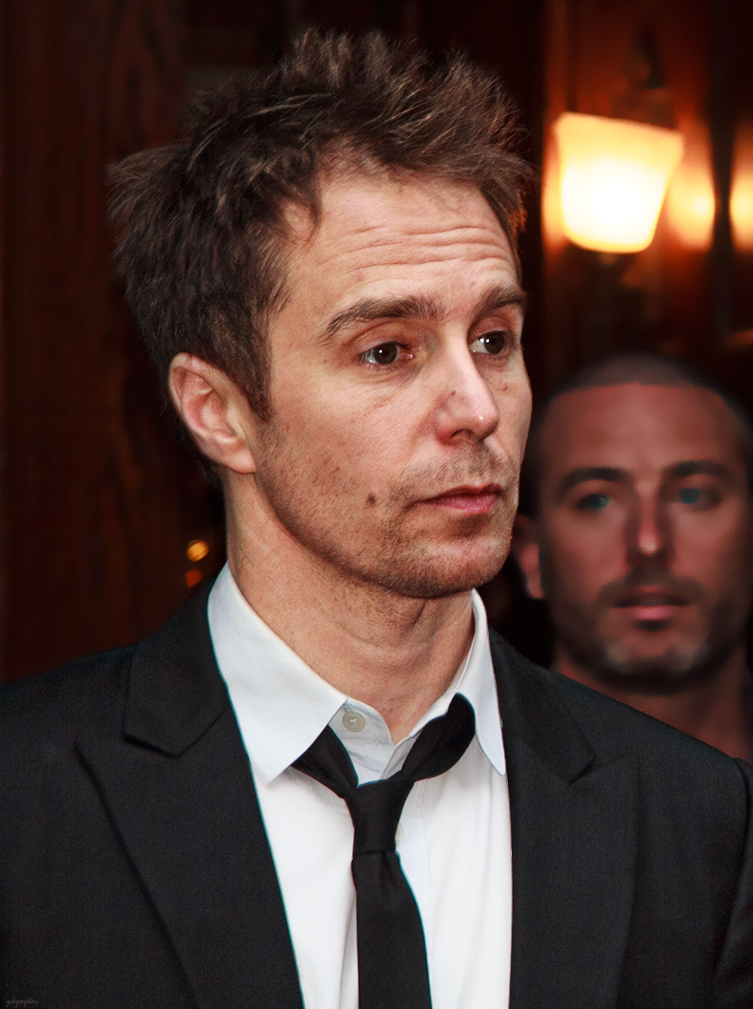
Sam Rockwell, Best Supporting Actor in a Motion Picture winner

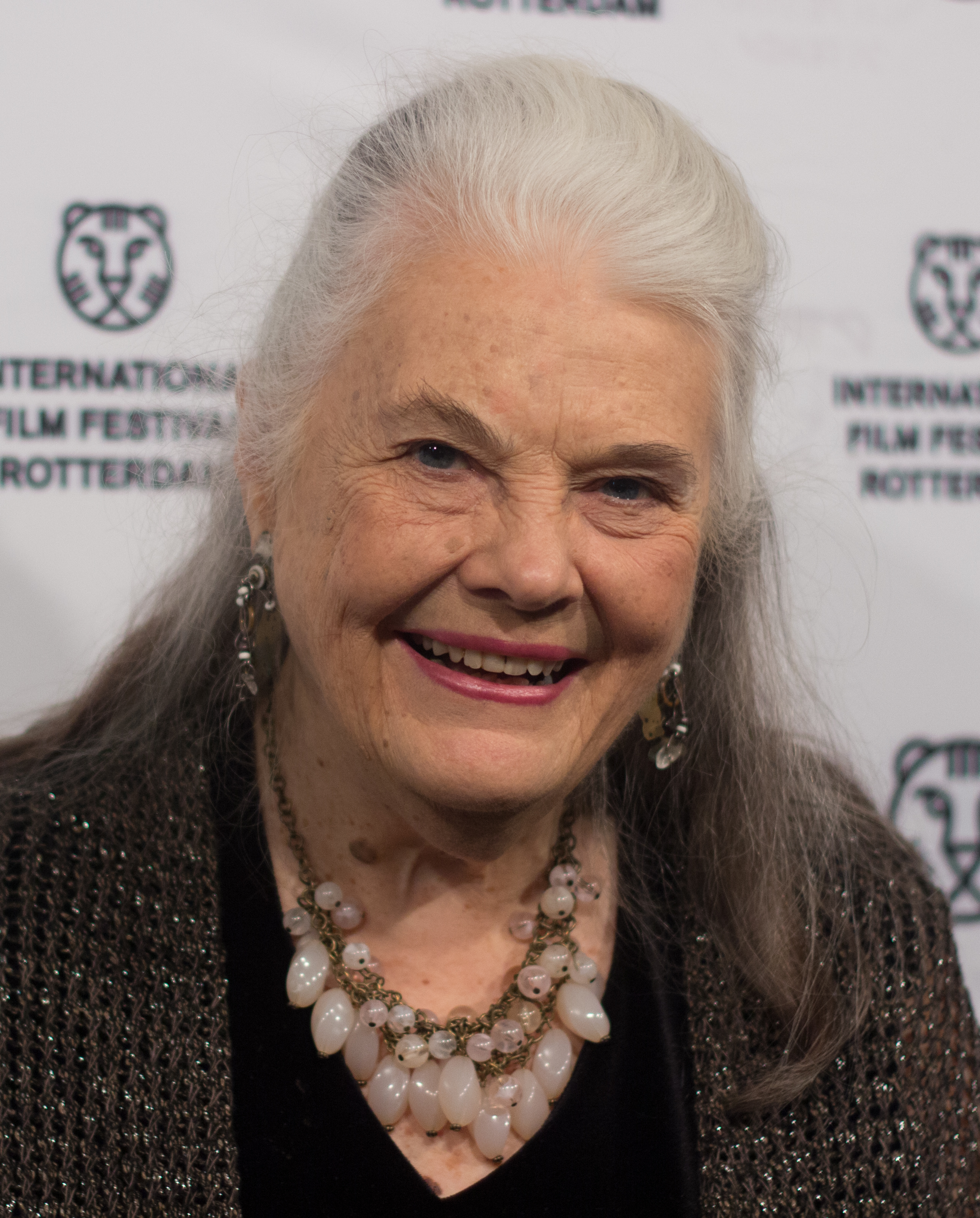
Lois Smith, Best Supporting Actress in a Motion Picture winner

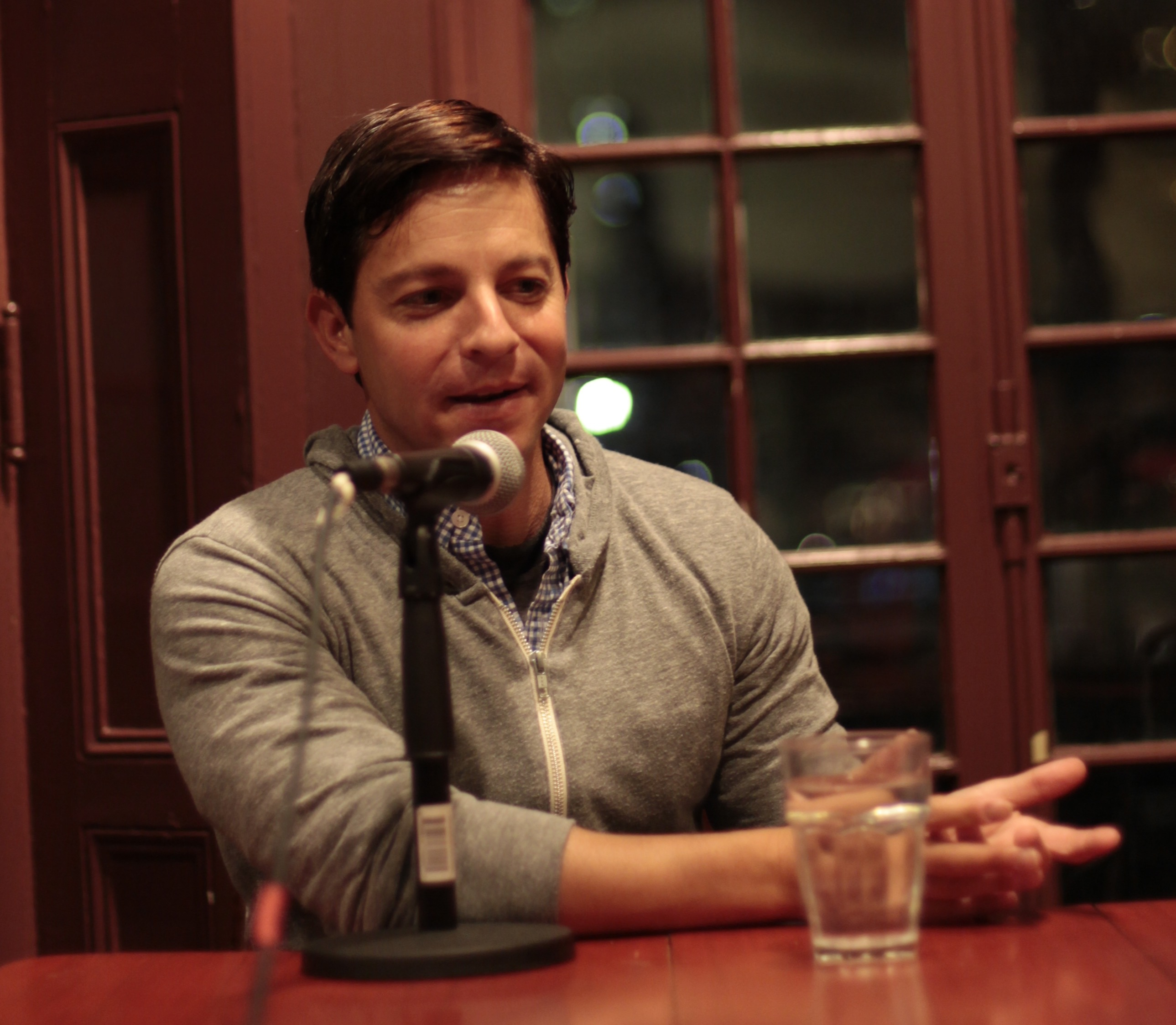
Scott Neustadter, Best Adapted Screenplay co-winner

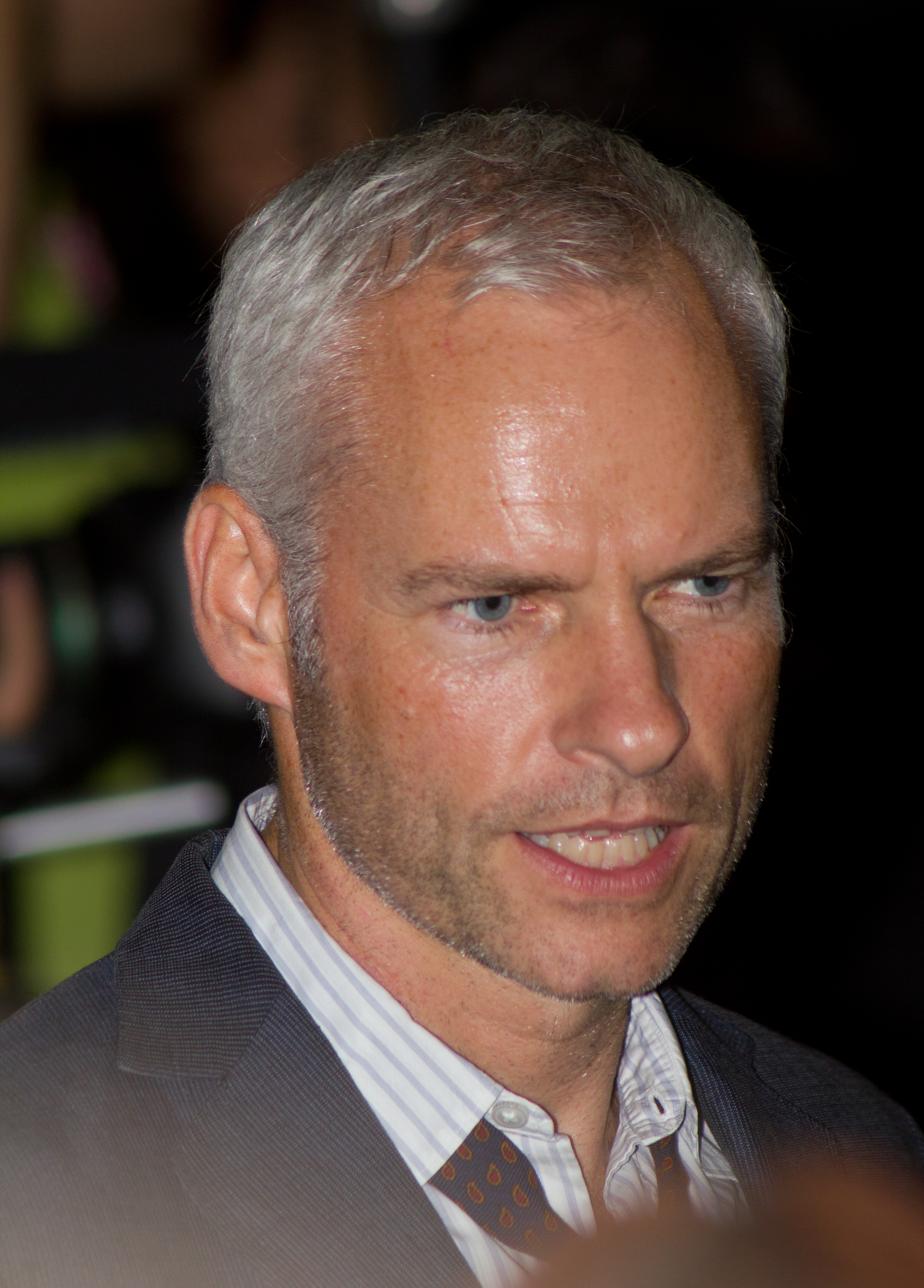
Martin McDonagh, Best Original Screenplay winner

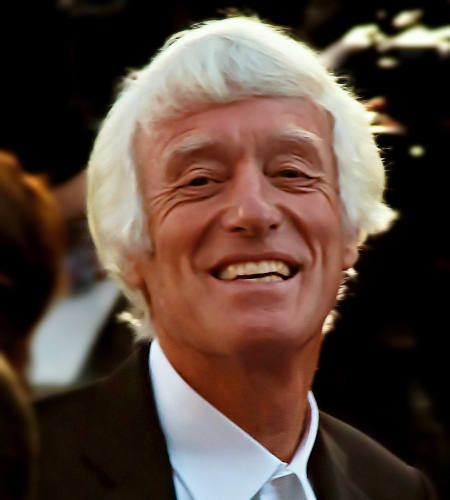
Roger Deakins, Best Cinematography winner

Winners are listed first and highlighted in bold.

Best Film	Best Director
**God's Own Country (Independent)**; **Three Billboards Outside Ebbing, Missouri (Major)**; The Big Sick; Call Me by Your Name; Dunkirk; Get Out; I, Tonya; Lady Bird; Mudbound; The Shape of Water	**Jordan Peele – Get Out**; Sean Baker – The Florida Project; Guillermo del Toro – The Shape of Water; Greta Gerwig – Lady Bird; Christopher Nolan – Dunkirk; Dee Rees – Mudbound
Best Actor	Best Actress
**Gary Oldman – Darkest Hour as Winston Churchill (Major)**; **Harry Dean Stanton – Lucky as Lucky (Independent)**; Daniel Day-Lewis – Phantom Thread as Reynolds Woodcock; James Franco – The Disaster Artist as Tommy Wiseau; Jake Gyllenhaal – Stronger as Jeff Bauman; Robert Pattinson – Good Time as Constantine "Connie" Nikas; Jeremy Renner – Wind River as Cory Lambert	**Sally Hawkins – The Shape of Water as Elisa Esposito (Major)**; **Diane Kruger – In the Fade as Katja Şekerci (Independent)**; Jessica Chastain – Molly's Game as Molly Bloom; Judi Dench – Victoria & Abdul as Queen Victoria; Frances McDormand – Three Billboards Outside Ebbing, Missouri as Mildred Hayes; Margot Robbie – I, Tonya as Tonya Harding; Saoirse Ronan – Lady Bird as Christine "Lady Bird" McPherson; Emma Stone – Battle of the Sexes as Billie Jean King
Best Supporting Actor	Best Supporting Actress
**Sam Rockwell – Three Billboards Outside Ebbing, Missouri as Jason Dixon**; Willem Dafoe – The Florida Project as Bobby Hicks; Armie Hammer – Call Me by Your Name as Oliver; Dustin Hoffman – The Meyerowitz Stories (New and Selected) as Harold Meyerowitz; Mark Rylance – Dunkirk as Mr. Dawson; Michael Shannon – The Shape of Water as Richard Strickland	**Lois Smith – Marjorie Prime as Marjorie**; Mary J. Blige – Mudbound as Florence Jackson; Holly Hunter – The Big Sick as Beth Gardner; Allison Janney – I, Tonya as LaVona Golden; Melissa Leo – Novitiate as Reverend Mother; Laurie Metcalf – Lady Bird as Marion McPherson
Best Original Screenplay	Best Adapted Screenplay
**Three Billboards Outside Ebbing, Missouri – Martin McDonagh**; Dunkirk – Christopher Nolan; The Florida Project – Sean Baker and Chris Bergoch; Get Out – Jordan Peele; Lady Bird – Greta Gerwig; The Shape of Water – Guillermo del Toro and Vanessa Taylor	**The Disaster Artist – Scott Neustadter and Michael H. Weber**; Call Me by Your Name – James Ivory; Molly's Game – Aaron Sorkin; Victoria & Abdul – Lee Hall; Wonderstruck – Brian Selznick; Wonder Woman – Jason Fuchs and Allan Heinberg
Best Animated or Mixed Media Film	Best Foreign Language Film
**Coco**; Birdboy: The Forgotten Children; The Boss Baby; The Breadwinner; Cars 3; The Lego Batman Movie; Loving Vincent	**In the Fade** (Germany); BPM (Beats per Minute) (France); The Divine Order (Switzerland); First They Killed My Father (Cambodia); Foxtrot (Israel); Loveless (Russia); The Square (Sweden); White Sun (Nepal)
Best Documentary Film	Best Cinematography
**Chasing Coral**; City of Ghosts; Cries from Syria; Ex Libris: The New York Public Library; Hell on Earth: The Fall of Syria and the Rise of ISIS; Human Flow; Icarus; Kedi; Legion of Brothers	**Blade Runner 2049 – Roger Deakins**; Darkest Hour – Bruno Delbonnel; Dunkirk – Hoyte van Hoytema; Lady Bird – Sam Levy; The Shape of Water – Dan Laustsen; Three Billboards Outside Ebbing, Missouri – Ben Davis
Best Costume Design	Best Film Editing
**Phantom Thread – Mark Bridges**; Beauty and the Beast – Jacqueline Durran; The Beguiled – Stacey Battat; Dunkirk – Jeffrey Kurland; Murder on the Orient Express – Alexandra Byrne; Victoria & Abdul – Consolata Boyle	**War for the Planet of the Apes – William Hoy and Stan Salfas**; Baby Driver – Paul Machliss and Jonathan Amos; Darkest Hour – Valerio Bonelli; Dunkirk – Lee Smith; The Shape of Water – Sidney Wolinsky; Three Billboards Outside Ebbing, Missouri – Jon Gregory
Best Original Score	Best Original Song
**Wonder Woman – Rupert Gregson-Williams**; Darkest Hour – Dario Marianelli; Dunkirk – Hans Zimmer; The Shape of Water – Alexandre Desplat; War for the Planet of the Apes – Michael Giacchino; Wonderstruck – Carter Burwell	**"Stand Up for Something" – Marshall**; "I Don't Wanna Live Forever" – Fifty Shades Darker; "It Ain't Fair" – Detroit; "Prayers for This World" – Cries from Syria; "The Promise" – The Promise; "Truth to Power" – An Inconvenient Sequel: Truth to Power
Best Art Direction and Production Design	Best Sound (Editing and Mixing)
**The Shape of Water – Paul Denham Austerberry**; Blade Runner 2049 – Dennis Gassner; Downsizing – Stefania Cella; Dunkirk – Nathan Crowley; Get Out – Rusty Smith; Phantom Thread – Mark Tildesley	**Dunkirk – Alex Gibson, Richard King, Gregg Landaker, Gary A. Rizzo, and Mark Weingarten**; Blade Runner 2049; Coco; Darkest Hour; Logan; War for the Planet of the Apes
Best Visual Effects
**Blade Runner 2049 – Richard R. Hoover, Paul Lambert, Gerd Nefzer, and John Nelson**; Alien: Covenant; Dunkirk; The Shape of Water; War for the Planet of the Apes; Wonder Woman

=== Films with multiple nominations ===
Nominations	Films
11	Dunkirk
10	The Shape of Water
6	Lady Bird
6	Three Billboards Outside Ebbing, Missouri
5	Darkest Hour
4	Blade Runner 2049
4	Get Out
4	Mudbound
4	War for the Planet of the Apes
3	Call Me by Your Name
3	The Florida Project
3	I, Tonya
3	Phantom Thread
3	Victoria & Abdul
3	Wonder Woman
2	The Big Sick
2	Coco
2	Cries from Syria
2	The Disaster Artist
2	In the Fade
2	Molly's Game
2	Wonderstruck

=== Films with multiple wins ===
Wins	Films
3	Three Billboards Outside Ebbing, Missouri
2	Blade Runner 2049
2	In the Fade
2	The Shape of Water

== Television winners and nominees ==
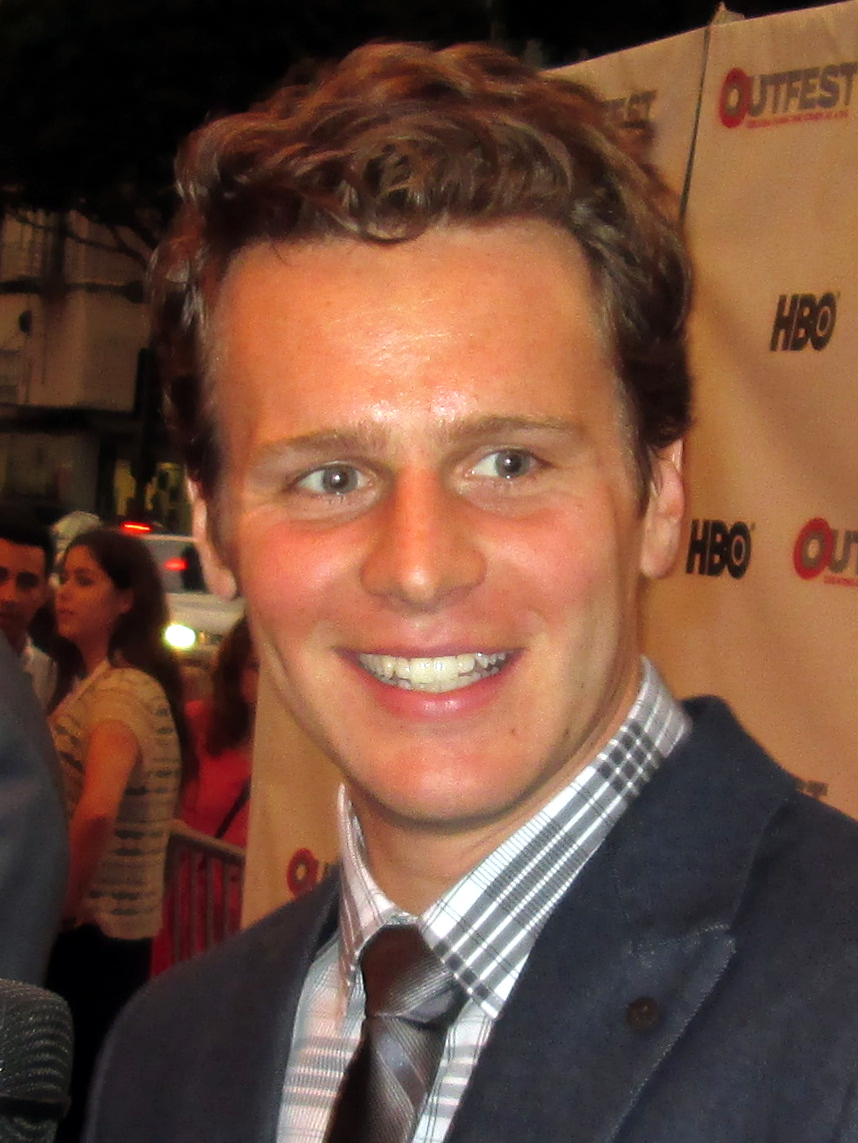
Jonathan Groff, Best Actor in a Drama / Genre Series winner

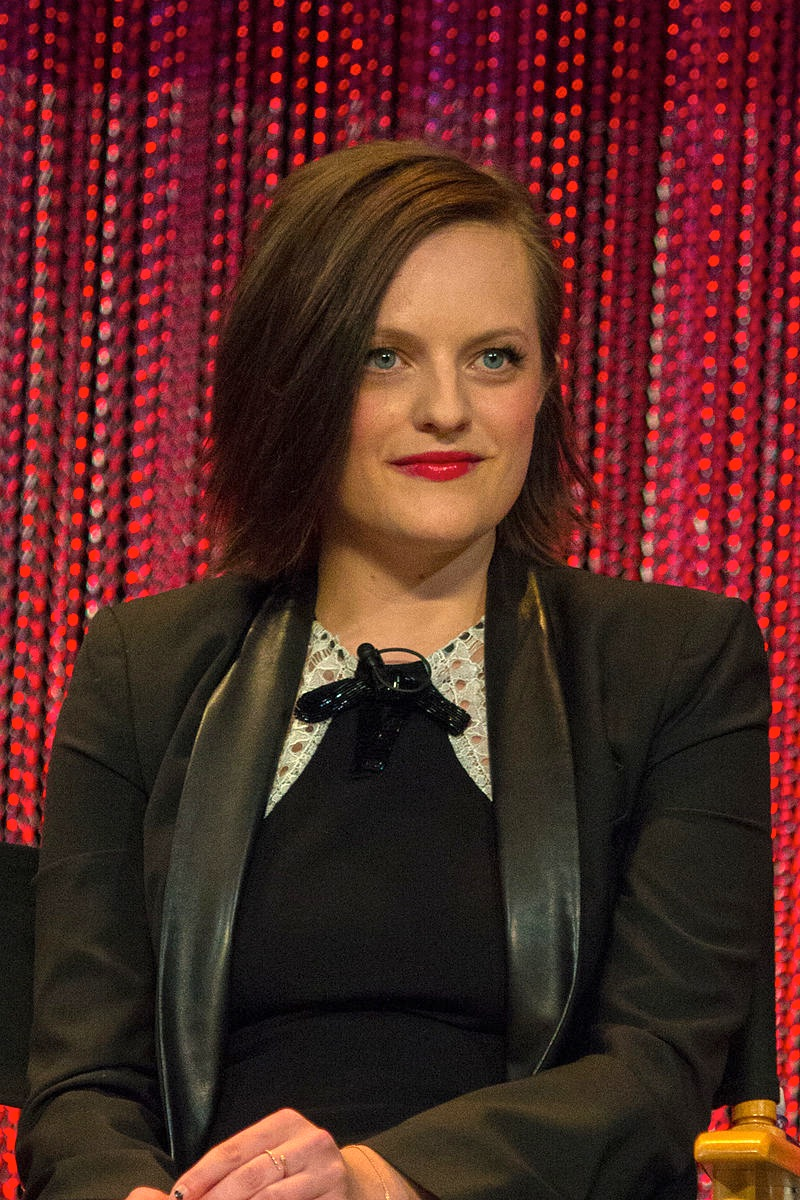
Elisabeth Moss, Best Actress in a Drama / Genre Series winner

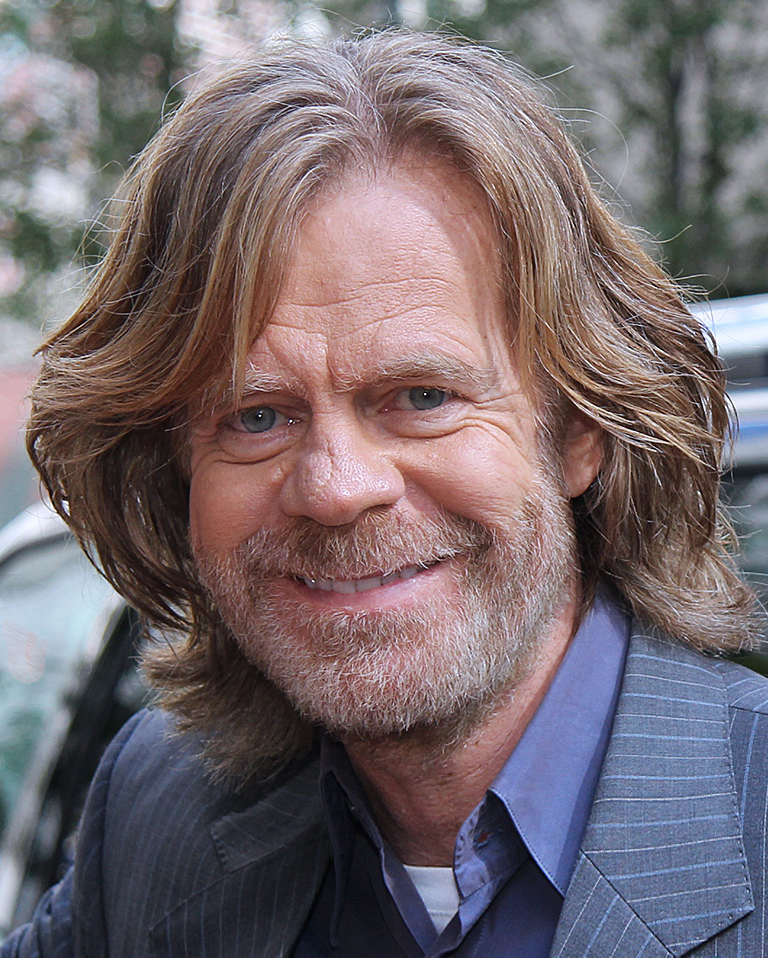
William H. Macy, Best Actor in a Comedy or Musical Series winner

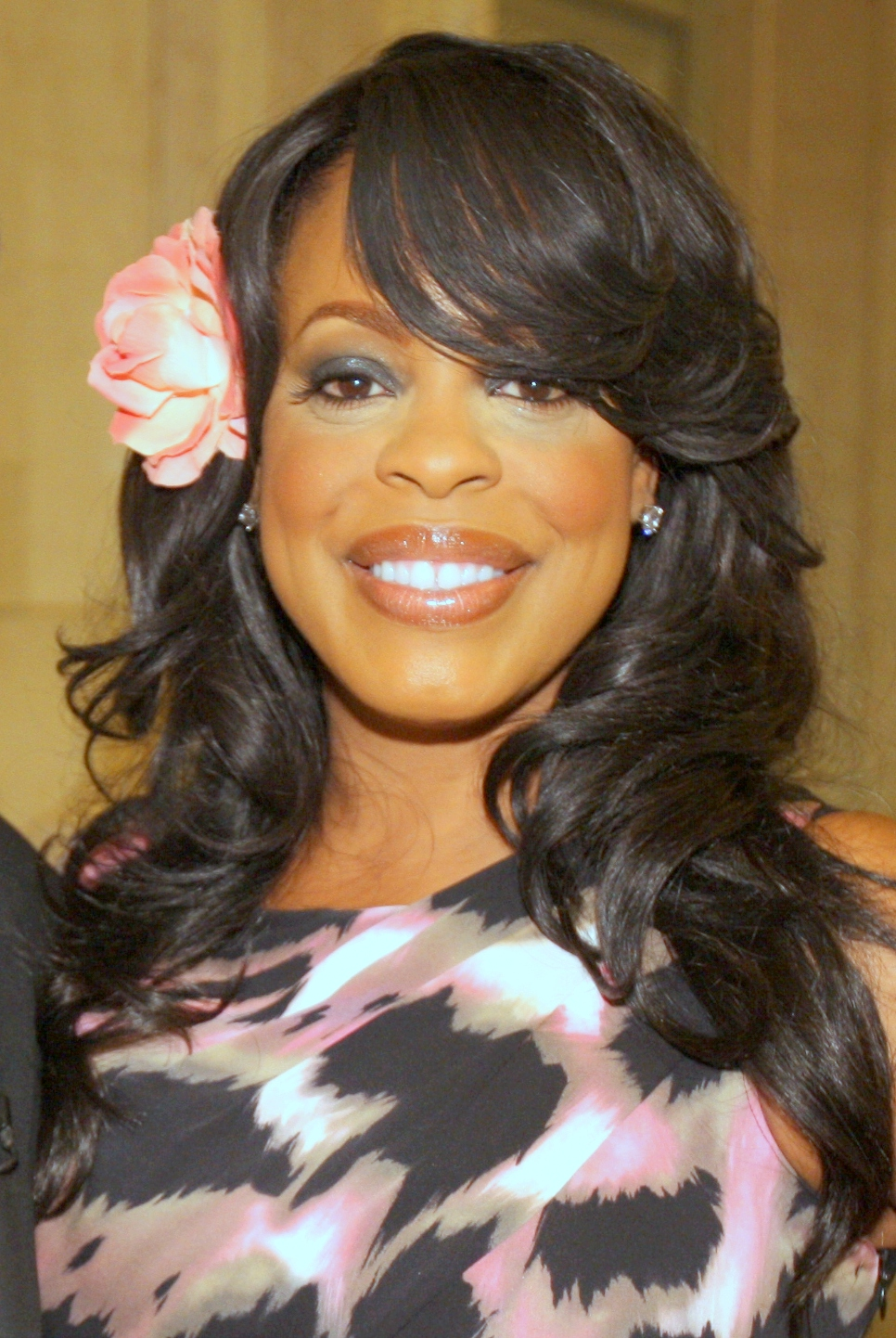
Niecy Nash, Best Actress in a Comedy or Musical Series winner

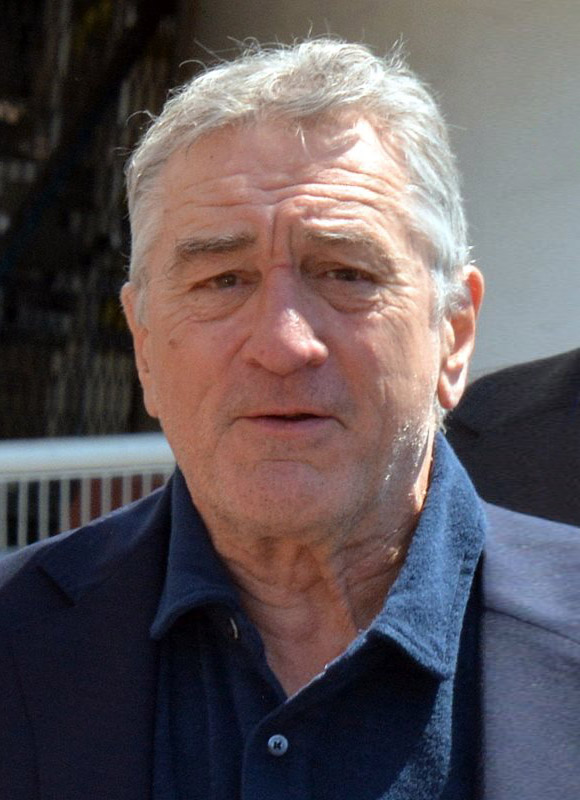
Robert De Niro, Best Actor in a Miniseries or Television Film winner

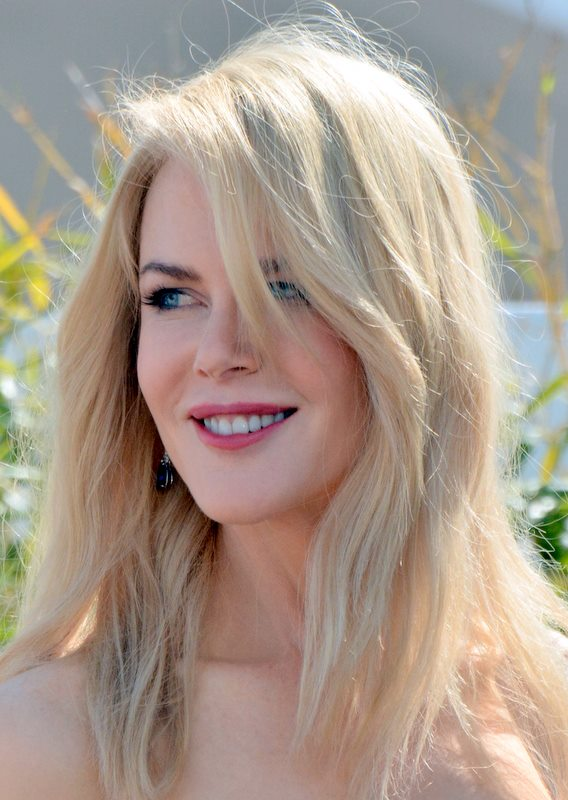
Nicole Kidman, Best Actress in a Miniseries or Television Film winner

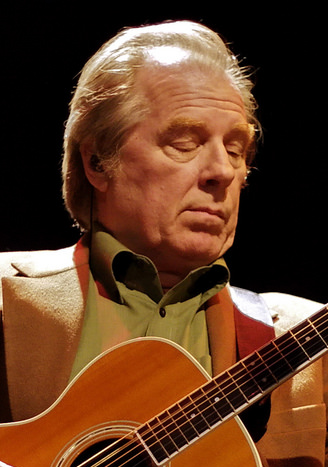
Michael McKean, Best Supporting Actor in a Series, Miniseries, or Television Film winner

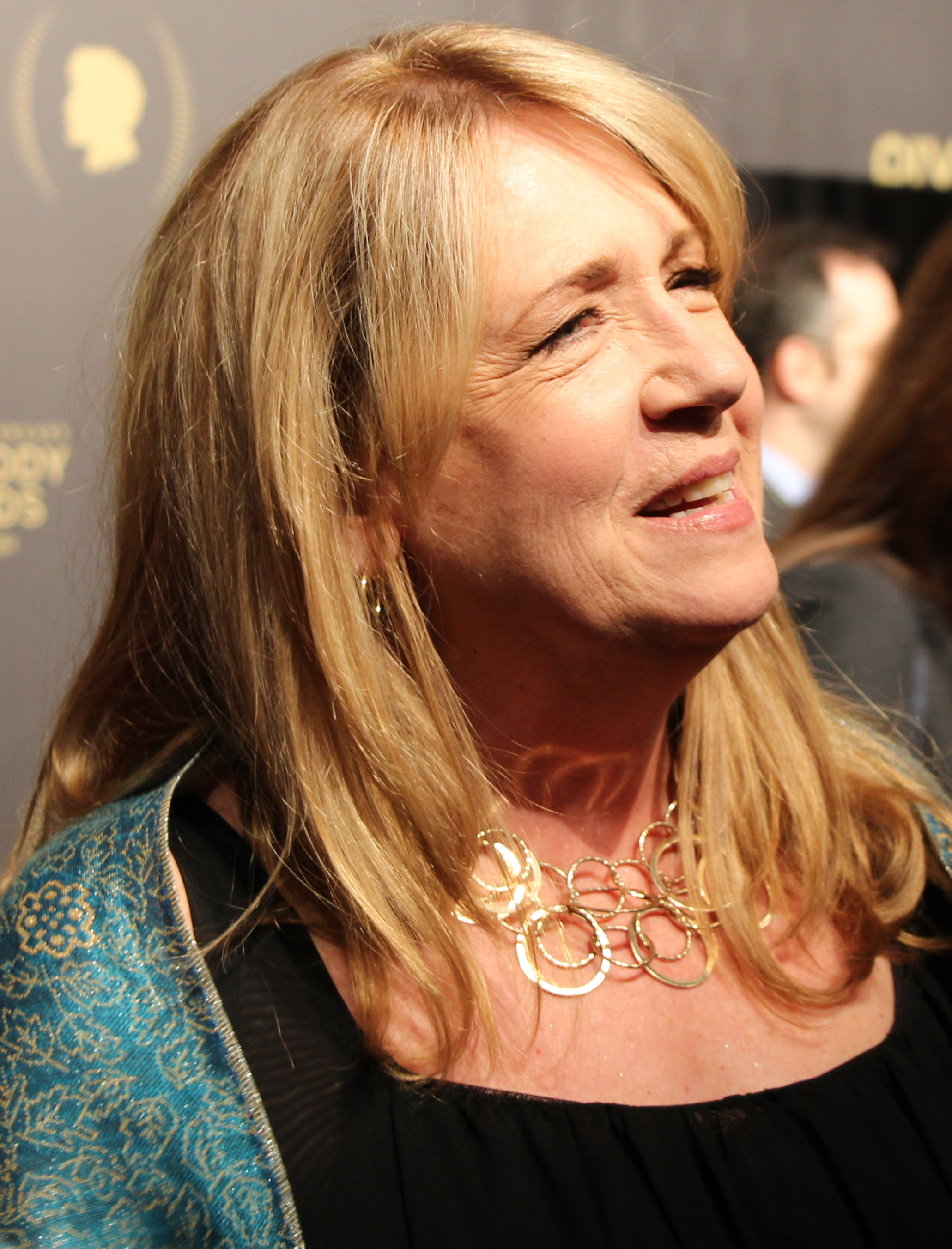
Ann Dowd, Best Supporting Actress in a Series, Miniseries, or Television Film winner

Winners are listed first and highlighted in bold.

Best Drama Series	Best Musical or Comedy Series
**Vikings – History**; 13 Reasons Why – Netflix; The Affair – Showtime; The Handmaid's Tale – Hulu; Mindhunter – Netflix; Taboo – FX; This Is Us – NBC	**GLOW – Netflix**; Atypical – Netflix; Baskets – FX; Claws – TNT; Orange Is the New Black – Netflix; Veep – HBO
Best Genre Series	Best Miniseries
**Game of Thrones – HBO**; American Gods – Starz; The Leftovers – HBO; Legion – FX; Outlander – Starz; Stranger Things – Netflix	**Big Little Lies – HBO**; Feud: Bette and Joan – FX; Guerrilla – Showtime; Rillington Place – Sundance Now; When We Rise – ABC; The Young Pope – HBO
Best Actor in a Drama / Genre Series	Best Actress in a Drama / Genre Series
**Jonathan Groff – Mindhunter as Holden Ford**; Brendan Gleeson – Mr. Mercedes as Detective Bill Hodges; Tom Hardy – Taboo as James Keziah Delaney; Sam Heughan – Outlander as Jamie Fraser; Harry Treadaway – Mr. Mercedes as Brady Hartsfield	**Elisabeth Moss – The Handmaid's Tale as Offred / June Osborne**; Caitriona Balfe – Outlander as Claire Fraser; Carrie Coon – The Leftovers as Nora Durst; Maggie Gyllenhaal – The Deuce as Eileen "Candy" Merrell; Katherine Langford – 13 Reasons Why as Hannah Baker; Ruth Wilson – The Affair as Alison Lockhart
Best Actor in a Musical or Comedy Series	Best Actress in a Musical or Comedy Series
**William H. Macy – Shameless as Frank Gallagher**; Aziz Ansari – Master of None as Dev Shah; Zach Galifianakis – Baskets as Chip and Dale Baskets; Neil Patrick Harris – A Series of Unfortunate Events as Count Olaf; John Lithgow – Trial & Error as Larry Henderson; Thomas Middleditch – Silicon Valley as Richard Hendricks	**Niecy Nash – Claws as Desna Simms**; Alison Brie – GLOW as Ruth "Zoya the Destroya" Wilder; Kathryn Hahn – I Love Dick as Chris Kraus; Ellie Kemper – Unbreakable Kimmy Schmidt as Kimmy Schmidt; Julia Louis-Dreyfus – Veep as Selina Meyer; Issa Rae – Insecure as Issa Dee
Best Actor in a Miniseries or TV Film	Best Actress in a Miniseries or TV Film
**Robert De Niro – The Wizard of Lies as Bernie Madoff**; Benedict Cumberbatch – Sherlock as Sherlock Holmes; Jude Law – The Young Pope as Pope Pius XIII; Ewan McGregor – Fargo as Emmit and Ray Stussy; Tim Pigott-Smith – King Charles III as King Charles III	**Nicole Kidman – Big Little Lies as Celeste Wright**; Joanne Froggatt – Dark Angel as Mary Ann Cotton; Jessica Lange – Feud: Bette and Joan as Joan Crawford; Elisabeth Moss – Top of the Lake: China Girl as Robin Griffin; Michelle Pfeiffer – The Wizard of Lies as Ruth Madoff; Susan Sarandon – Feud: Bette and Joan as Bette Davis
Best Supporting Actor in a Series, Miniseries or TV Film	Best Supporting Actress in a Series, Miniseries or TV Film
**Michael McKean – Better Call Saul as Chuck McGill**; Louie Anderson – Baskets as Christine Baskets; Christopher Eccleston – The Leftovers as Matt Jamison; Alexander Skarsgård – Big Little Lies as Perry Wright; Lakeith Stanfield – War Machine as Corporal Billy Cole; Stanley Tucci – Feud: Bette and Joan as Jack L. Warner	**Ann Dowd – The Handmaid's Tale as Aunt Lydia**; Danielle Brooks – Orange Is the New Black as Tasha "Taystee" Jefferson; Judy Davis – Feud: Bette and Joan as Hedda Hopper; Laura Dern – Big Little Lies as Renata Klein; Regina King – American Crime as Kimara Walters; Shailene Woodley – Big Little Lies as Jane Chapman
Best Television Film
**The Wizard of Lies – HBO**; The Immortal Life of Henrietta Lacks – HBO; King Charles III – BBC / PBS; To Walk Invisible: The Bronte Sisters – Netflix; War Machine – Netflix

=== Series with multiple nominations ===
Nominations	Series
5	Big Little Lies
5	Feud: Bette and Joan
3	Baskets
3	The Handmaid's Tale
3	The Leftovers
3	Outlander
3	The Wizard of Lies
2	13 Reasons Why
2	The Affair
2	Claws
2	Fargo
2	GLOW
2	King Charles III
2	Mindhunter
2	Mr. Mercedes
2	Orange Is the New Black
2	Taboo
2	Veep
2	War Machine
2	The Young Pope

=== Series with multiple wins ===
Wins	Series
2	Big Little Lies
2	The Handmaid's Tale
2	The Wizard of Lies

== New Media winners and nominees ==
Best Overall	Youth
Humans 2.0; 100 Years of Olympic Films: 1912–2012; Alien Anthology; Daughters of the Dust; The Salesman	The Planet Earth Collection; Cars 3; Despicable Me 3; The Lion King; Peanuts Holiday Collection
Sports/Racing Games	Action/Adventure Games
Madden NFL 18; Everybody's Golf; Football Manager 2018; MLB The Show 17; Pro Evolution Soccer 2018	Super Mario Odyssey; The Legend of Zelda: Breath of the Wild; Nier: Automata; Pyre; Tom Clancy's Ghost Recon Wildlands
Mobile Games	
Monument Valley 2; Age of Rivals; Cat Quest; Egglia: Legend of the Redcap; Yankai's Peak	
