= Mary Pickford Award =

Award for contribution to the entertainment industry

The Mary Pickford Award is an honorary Satellite Award bestowed by the International Press Academy. It is "IPA's most prestigious honor" and as an award "for Outstanding Artistic Contribution to the Entertainment Industry" it reflects a lifetime of achievement.

The award is named for Canadian American Mary Pickford, early pioneer of the film industry, who began her career as a child actress and went on to become "America's Sweetheart" and a co-founder of United Artists Studios with fellow filmmakers Charlie Chaplin, Douglas Fairbanks and D. W. Griffith. The trophy awarded to the honorees is a bust of Pickford cast in bronze, on a marble base, inscribed for the recipient. It was designed by Sarajevan sculptor Dragan Radenović.

The award was first presented to Rod Steiger at the 1st Golden Satellite Awards.

== Honorees ==
- 1996: Rod Steiger
- 1997: Jodie Foster
- 1998: Alan J. Pakula
- 1999: Maximilian Schell
- 2000: Francis Ford Coppola
- 2001: Karl Malden
- 2002: Robert Evans
- 2003: Arnon Milchan
- 2004: Susan Sarandon
- 2005: Gena Rowlands
- 2006: Martin Landau
- 2007: Kathy Bates
- 2008: Louis Gossett Jr.
- 2009: Michael York
- 2010: Vanessa Williams
- 2011: Mitzi Gaynor
- 2012: Terence Stamp
- 2013: Mike Medavoy
- 2014: Ellen Burstyn
- 2015: Louise Fletcher
- 2016: Edward James Olmos
- 2017: Dabney Coleman
- 2018: Rade Šerbedžija
- 2019: Stacy Keach
- 2020: Tilda Swinton
- 2021: Tom Skerritt
- 2022: Diane Warren
- 2023: Jon Landau
- 2024: James Woods
- 2025: Antonio Banderas
