= Satellite Award for Best Television Series – Genre =

Annual television award

- Awarded for: Best Television Series – Genre
- Country: United States
- Presented by: International Press Academy
- First award: 2011
- Currently held by: Andor (2025)

The Satellite Award for Best Genre Series, first handed out in 2011, is an annual award given by the International Press Academy as one of its Satellite Awards.

== Winners and nominees ==
=== 2010s ===
Year	Winners and nominees	Network(s)
2011	American Horror Story	FX
2011	Game of Thrones	HBO
2011	True Blood	HBO
2011	The Walking Dead	AMC
2011	Once Upon a Time	ABC
2011	Torchwood	BBC
2012	The Walking Dead	AMC
2012	Arrow	The CW
2012	Supernatural	The CW
2012	Fringe	Fox
2012	Grimm	NBC
2012	Revolution	NBC
2012	Once Upon a Time	ABC
2013	Game of Thrones	HBO
2013	Agents of S.H.I.E.L.D.	ABC
2013	Once Upon a Time	ABC
2013	American Horror Story: Coven	FX
2013	Arrow	The CW
2013	Grimm	NBC
2013	The Walking Dead	AMC
2014	Penny Dreadful	Showtime
2014	American Horror Story: Freak Show	FX
2014	The Strain	FX
2014	Game of Thrones	HBO
2014	The Leftovers	HBO
2014	Grimm	NBC
2014	Sleepy Hollow	Fox
2015	The Walking Dead	AMC
2015	Jonathan Strange & Mr Norrell	BBC America
2015	Orphan Black	BBC America
2015	The Leftovers	HBO
2015	Humans	AMC
2015	Into the Badlands	AMC
2015	Penny Dreadful	Showtime
2016	Outlander	Starz
2016	Black Mirror	Netflix
2016	Game of Thrones	HBO
2016	Westworld	HBO
2016	The Man in the High Castle	Amazon Prime Video
2016	Orphan Black	BBC America
2016	Stranger Things	Netflix
2016	The Walking Dead	AMC
2017	Game of Thrones	HBO
2017	American Gods	Starz
2017	The Leftovers	HBO
2017	Legion	FX
2017	Outlander	Starz
2017	Stranger Things	Netflix
2018	The Terror	AMC
2018	Castle Rock	Hulu
2018	Counterpart	Starz
2018	Doctor Who	BBC America
2018	The Man in the High Castle	Prime Video
2019	Stranger Things	Netflix
2019	Carnival Row	Prime Video
2019	Game of Thrones	HBO
2019	Watchmen	HBO
2019	His Dark Materials	HBO
2019	The Terror	AMC

=== 2020s ===
Year	Winners and nominees	Network
2020	The Haunting of Bly Manor	Netflix
2020	Evil	CBS
2020	His Dark Materials	HBO
2020	The Outsider	HBO
2020	The Mandalorian	Disney+
2020	Pennyworth	Epix
2021	WandaVision	Disney+
2021	Evil	CBS
2021	Sweet Tooth	Netflix
2021	Them	Prime Video
2022	The Boys	Prime Video
2022	From	Epix
2022	The Man Who Fell to Earth	Showtime
2022	Outlander	Starz
2022	Severance	Apple TV+
2022	Stranger Things	Netflix
2023	Yellowjackets	Showtime
2023	From	MGM+
2023	House of the Dragon	HBO
2023	The Morning Show	Apple TV+
2023	The Power	Prime Video
2023	The White Lotus	HBO
