= JustSaying =

#JustSaying
- Genre: web series, drama, comedy
- Created by: Fund B92, Tuna Fish Studio
- Directed by: Jelena Gavrilović; Luka Bursać
- Starring: Milena Stanić; Mladen Sovilj; Ana Mandić; Ana Stojanovska; Davor Golubović; Bujar Ahmeti; Jelena Asanović; Stefan Đorđević; Mladen Andrejević; Dragana Mirković (cameo)
- Country of origin: Serbia
- Original languages: Macedonian, Albanian English
- No. of seasons: 1
- No. of episodes: 26

Production
- Executive producer: Tuna Fish Studio
- Producer: Fund B92
- Production locations: Belgrade, Sarajevo, Kotor, Prizren, Novi Sad
- Editor: Nataša Pantić

Original release
- Network: YouTube
- Release: 7 November 2013 – 2014

#JustSaying is the first web series in the Balkans for teenagers about the relationships of a small group of young people from different countries. The series is broadcast online only – on the official YouTube channel, official Facebook page of the series and on the samokažem.org web site. Each webisode is subtitled in Serbian, Croatian, Bosnian, Macedonian, Albanian and English languages.

The first season was launched on November 7, 2013. It consist of 26 five minutes' webisodes that are distributed on Mondays and Thursdays at 10 pm. The series is produced by Fund B92. Tuna Fish Studio is the executive producer of the series.

== Plot ==
The storyline follows events of an (un)usual summer in the life of a small number of girls and boys that gradually become true friends. They all come from different countries that share borders that their population members choose to cross only rarely and unwillingly. They speak different languages, but can excellently understand each other.

== Music ==
Thrilling soundtrack of the series ranges from the music by Voodoo Popeye to that produced by the Stray Dogg, from Vlado Georgijev's songs to Prti Bee Gee. Descriptions of each webisode contain titles of songs used in the series, and almost all the music used is available for listening on the official SoundCloud channel of the series.

== Critical reception ==
During the initial 40 days of distribution, when the first ten webisodes were broadcast, the YouTube channel counted more than 150.000 views, and its Facebook page got almost 10,000 likes. In August 2014. YouTube channel reached 700.000 views.

The launch and broadcasting of the series were greeted by many media, too, and the quality of the series' production was additionally acclaimed by several awards and nominations. In February 2014 the series won the "Satellite" award in short form category; one month later the series was awarded at the LAWEBFEST u the following two categories: Director of photography and Lead actress; in April of the same year the series was proclaimed the official Webby honoree in category Online Film & Video, subcategory Drama: long form or series; same period saw the series awarded gold medal at the World media festival in Hamburg; bit later the series was nominated for the Rocky award at the B.A.N.F. World media festival; finally, at the Melbourne web fest the series entered the official selection.

== Re:Generation ==
JustSaying web series is a segment of Re:Generation Project. Re:Generation (Re:Generacija) is an online facility and place for the young people from this region, aimed to facilitate their communication about themselves. At the same time, Re:Generation is a place for them to see and hear what other young people have to say, to meet their peers and to learn about their similarities and differences. This is where they can read, watch and hear about interesting initiatives from this region and internationally, and to share their ideas with the re:generation community in their creative efforts on providing solutions for local problems and in their creative social involvement.

Re:Generation is mainly available at official website of the series.
