= Satellite Award for Best Motion Picture =

Annual film award

Satellite Award for Best Film
- Awarded for: Best Dramatic Film; Best Comedy or Musical Film
- Country: United States
- Presented by: International Press Academy
- First award: 1996
- Currently held by: Comedy or Musical: Anora (2024); Drama: The Brutalist (2024)

The Satellite Award for Best Motion Picture is one of the annual awards given to motion pictures by the International Press Academy. The category was gone through several changes since its inception, specially related to the genre of the film awarded.

== History ==
- From 1996 to 2010, two categories based on genre were presented, Best Drama Film and Best Comedy or Musical Film
- In 2011, the IPA pared down its Satellite Award nominations in the motion picture categories from 22 to 19 classifications; the change reflects the merger of drama and comedy under a general Best Picture heading, including the Best Actor/Actress headings and the Supporting headings.
- In 2016 and 2017, two winners were announced within the Best Motion Picture category, one for a major studio film and other for an independent film.
- In 2018, a stand-alone category for independent film was presented.

Since 2018, the two categories based on genre are presented replacing the Best Motion Picture category for the Best Drama Film and Best Comedy or Musical Film categories previously presented.

== Winners and nominees ==
=== Comedy or Musical (1996–2010, 2018–present) ===
Year	Film	Director(s)
1996	Evita	Alan Parker
1996	Cold Comfort Farm	John Schlesinger
1996	Everyone Says I Love You	Woody Allen
1996	Flirting with Disaster	David O. Russell
1996	Swingers	Doug Liman
1997	As Good as It Gets	James L. Brooks
1997	Deconstructing Harry	Woody Allen
1997	The Full Monty	Peter Cattaneo
1997	In & Out	Frank Oz
1997	My Best Friend's Wedding	P. J. Hogan
1998	Shakespeare in Love	John Madden
1998	Little Voice	Mark Herman
1998	Pleasantville	Gary Ross
1998	Waking Ned	Kirk Jones
1998	You've Got Mail	Nora Ephron
1999	Being John Malkovich	Spike Jonze
1999	Bowfinger	Mark Herman
1999	Dick	Andrew Fleming
1999	Election	Alexander Payne
1999	An Ideal Husband	Oliver Parker
1999	Notting Hill	Roger Michell
2000	Nurse Betty	Neil LaBute
2000	Almost Famous	Cameron Crowe
2000	Best in Show	Christopher Guest
2000	O Brother, Where Art Thou?	Joel Coen
2000	State and Main	David Mamet
2000	Wonder Boys	Curtis Hanson
2001	Moulin Rouge!	Baz Luhrmann
2001	Bridget Jones's Diary	Sharon Maguire
2001	Gosford Park	Robert Altman
2001	Hedwig and the Angry Inch	John Cameron Mitchell
2001	The Royal Tenenbaums	Wes Anderson
2002	My Big Fat Greek Wedding	Joel Zwick
2002	About a Boy	Paul Weitz and Chris Weitz
2002	Adaptation.	Spike Jonze
2002	Igby Goes Down	Burr Steers
2002	Punch-Drunk Love	Paul Thomas Anderson
2003	Lost in Translation	Sofia Coppola
2003	American Splendor	Shari Springer Berman and Robert Pulcini
2003	Bad Santa	Terry Zwigoff
2003	Bend It Like Beckham	Gurinder Chadha
2003	A Mighty Wind	Christopher Guest
2003	Pirates of the Caribbean: The Curse of the Black Pearl	Gore Verbinski
2004	Sideways	Alexander Payne
2004	The Life Aquatic with Steve Zissou	Wes Anderson
2004	The Merchant of Venice	Michael Radford
2004	Napoleon Dynamite	Jared Hess
2004	The Phantom of the Opera	Joel Schumacher
2004	Ray	Taylor Hackford
2005	Walk the Line	James Mangold
2005	Happy Endings	Don Roos
2005	Hustle & Flow	Craig Brewer
2005	Kung Fu Hustle	Stephen Chow
2005	Rent	Chris Columbus
2005	Shopgirl	Anand Tucker
2006	Dreamgirls	Bill Condon
2006	The Devil Wears Prada	David Frankel
2006	Little Miss Sunshine	Jonathan Dayton and Valerie Faris
2006	Stranger than Fiction	Marc Forster
2006	Thank You for Smoking	Jason Reitman
2006	Venus	Roger Michell
2007	Juno	Jason Reitman
2007	Hairspray	Adam Shankman
2007	Knocked Up	Judd Apatow
2007	Lars and the Real Girl	Craig Gillespie
2007	Margot at the Wedding	Noah Baumbach
2007	Shoot 'Em Up	Michael Davis
2008	Happy-Go-Lucky	Mike Leigh
2008	Choke	Clark Gregg
2008	In Bruges	Martin McDonagh
2008	Nick & Norah's Infinite Playlist	Peter Sollett
2008	Tropic Thunder	Ben Stiller
2008	Vicky Cristina Barcelona	Woody Allen
2009	Nine	Rob Marshall
2009	The Informant!	Steven Soderbergh
2009	It's Complicated	Nancy Meyers
2009	Julie & Julia	Nora Ephron
2009	A Serious Man	Joel and Ethan Coen
2009	Up in the Air	Jason Reitman
2010	Scott Pilgrim vs. the World	Edgar Wright
2010	Cyrus	Jay Duplass and Mark Duplass
2010	The Kids Are All Right	Lisa Cholodenko
2010	Made in Dagenham	Nigel Cole
2010	The Other Guys	Adam McKay
2010	Please Give	Nicole Holofcener
2010	Red	Robert Schwentke
2018	A Star Is Born	Bradley Cooper
2018	Crazy Rich Asians	Jon M. Chu
2018	The Favourite	Yorgos Lanthimos
2018	Green Book	Peter Farrelly
2018	Mary Poppins Returns	Rob Marshall
2018	Nico, 1988	Susanna Nicchiarelli
2019	Once Upon a Time in Hollywood	Quentin Tarantino
2019	The Farewell	Lulu Wang
2019	Hustlers	Lorene Scafaria
2019	Knives Out	Rian Johnson
2019	Rocketman	Dexter Fletcher
2019	Uncut Gems	Josh Safdie and Benny Safdie
2020	The Forty-Year-Old Version	Radha Blank
2020	Borat Subsequent Moviefilm	Jason Woliner
2020	Hamilton	Thomas Kail
2020	On the Rocks	Sofia Coppola
2020	Palm Springs	Max Barbakow
2020	The Personal History of David Copperfield	Armando Iannucci
2021	tick, tick... BOOM!	Lin-Manuel Miranda
2021	Cyrano	Joe Wright
2021	The French Dispatch	Wes Anderson
2021	In the Heights	Jon M. Chu
2021	Licorice Pizza	Paul Thomas Anderson
2021	Respect	Liesl Tommy
2022
2022	Everything Everywhere All at Once	Daniel Kwan and Daniel Scheinert
2022	The Banshees of Inisherin	Martin McDonagh
2022	Elvis	Baz Luhrmann
2022	Glass Onion: A Knives Out Mystery	Rian Johnson
2022	RRR	S. S. Rajamouli
2022	Triangle of Sadness	Ruben Östlund
2023	The Holdovers	Alexander Payne
2023	American Fiction	Cord Jefferson
2023	Barbie	Greta Gerwig
2023	Dream Scenario	Kristoffer Borgli
2023	Poor Things	Yorgos Lanthimos
2023	Scrapper	Charlotte Regan
2024	Anora	Sean Baker
2024	Ghostlight	Kelly O'Sullivan and Alex Thompson
2024	Hit Man	Richard Linklater
2024	LaRoy, Texas	Shane Atkinson
2024	A Real Pain	Jesse Eisenberg
2024	The Substance	Coralie Fargeat
2024	Thelma	Josh Margolin
2024	Wicked	Jon M. Chu
2025	Marty Supreme	Josh Safdie
2025	Bugonia	Yorgos Lanthimos
2025	Father Mother Sister Brother	Jim Jarmusch
2025	Nouvelle Vague	Richard Linklater
2025	Novocaine	Dan Berk and Robert Olsen
2025	Sorry, Baby	Eva Victor

=== Drama (1996–2010, 2018–present) ===
Year	Film	Director(s)
1996	Fargo	Joel Coen
1996	The English Patient	Anthony Minghella
1996	Lone Star	John Sayles
1996	Secrets & Lies	Mike Leigh
1996	Shine	Scott Hicks
1996	Trainspotting	Danny Boyle
1997	Titanic	James Cameron
1997	Amistad	Steven Spielberg
1997	Boogie Nights	Paul Thomas Anderson
1997	Good Will Hunting	Gus Van Sant
1997	L.A. Confidential	Curtis Hanson
1998	The Thin Red Line	Terrence Malick
1998	Elizabeth	Shekhar Kapur
1998	The General	John Boorman
1998	Gods and Monsters	Bill Condon
1998	Saving Private Ryan	Steven Spielberg
1999	The Insider	Michael Mann
1999	American Beauty	Sam Mendes
1999	Boys Don't Cry	Kimberly Peirce
1999	Magnolia	Paul Thomas Anderson
1999	Snow Falling on Cedars	Scott Hicks
1999	The Talented Mr. Ripley	Anthony Minghella
2000	Traffic	Steven Soderbergh
2000	Billy Elliot	Stephen Daldry
2000	Dancer in the Dark	Lars von Trier
2000	Erin Brockovich	Steven Soderbergh
2000	Gladiator	Ridley Scott
2000	Quills	Philip Kaufman
2001	In the Bedroom	Todd Field
2001	The Deep End	Scott McGehee and David Siegel
2001	Memento	Christopher Nolan
2001	The Others	Alejandro Amenábar
2001	Sexy Beast	Jonathan Glazer
2002	Far from Heaven	Todd Haynes
2002	Antwone Fisher	Denzel Washington
2002	The Hours	Stephen Daldry
2002	The Lord of the Rings: The Two Towers	Peter Jackson
2002	The Quiet American	Phillip Noyce
2002	Road to Perdition	Sam Mendes
2003	In America	Jim Sheridan
2003	The Last Samurai	Edward Zwick
2003	The Lord of the Rings: The Return of the King	Peter Jackson
2003	Master and Commander: The Far Side of the World	Peter Weir
2003	Mystic River	Clint Eastwood
2003	Thirteen	Catherine Hardwicke
2003	Whale Rider	Niki Caro
2004	Hotel Rwanda	Terry George
2004	The Aviator	Martin Scorsese
2004	Kill Bill: Volume 2	Quentin Tarantino
2004	Kinsey	Bill Condon
2004	Maria Full of Grace	Joshua Marston
2004	Vera Drake	Mike Leigh
2005	Brokeback Mountain	Ang Lee
2005	A History of Violence	David Cronenberg
2005	Capote	Bennett Miller
2005	Cinderella Man	Ron Howard
2005	Memoirs of a Geisha	Rob Marshall
2005	The War Within	Joseph Castelo
2006	The Departed	Martin Scorsese
2006	Babel	Alejandro González Iñárritu
2006	Flags of Our Fathers	Clint Eastwood
2006	Half Nelson	Ryan Fleck
2006	The Last King of Scotland	Kevin Macdonald
2006	Little Children	Todd Field
2006	The Queen	Stephen Frears
2007	No Country for Old Men	Joel and Ethan Coen
2007	3:10 to Yuma	James Mangold
2007	Away from Her	Sarah Polley
2007	Before the Devil Knows You're Dead	Sidney Lumet
2007	Eastern Promises	David Cronenberg
2007	The Lookout	Scott Frank
2008	Slumdog Millionaire	Danny Boyle
2008	Frost/Nixon	Ron Howard
2008	Frozen River	Courtney Hunt
2008	Milk	Gus Van Sant
2008	The Reader	Stephen Daldry
2008	Revolutionary Road	Sam Mendes
2009	The Hurt Locker	Kathryn Bigelow
2009	Bright Star	Jane Campion
2009	An Education	Lone Scherfig
2009	The Messenger	Oren Moverman
2009	Precious	Lee Daniels
2009	The Stoning of Soraya M.	Cyrus Nowrasteh
2010	The Social Network	David Fincher
2010	127 Hours	Danny Boyle
2010	Animal Kingdom	David Michôd
2010	Blue Valentine	Derek Cianfrance
2010	Get Low	Aaron Schneider
2010	The Ghost Writer	Roman Polanski
2010	Inception	Christopher Nolan
2010	The King's Speech	Tom Hooper
2010	The Town	Ben Affleck
2010	Winter's Bone	Debra Granik
2018	If Beale Street Could Talk	Barry Jenkins
2018	Black Panther	Ryan Coogler
2018	First Man	Damien Chazelle
2018	Hereditary	Ari Aster
2018	Mary Queen of Scots	Josie Rourke
2018	Widows	Steve McQueen
2019	Ford v Ferrari	James Mangold
2019	1917	Sam Mendes
2019	Bombshell	Jay Roach
2019	Burning Cane	Phillip Youmans
2019	Joker	Todd Phillips
2019	The Lighthouse	Robert Eggers
2019	Marriage Story	Noah Baumbach
2019	The Two Popes	Fernando Meirelles
2020	Nomadland	Chloé Zhao
2020	The Father	Florian Zeller
2020	Ma Rainey's Black Bottom	George C. Wolfe
2020	Minari	Lee Isaac Chung
2020	Miss Juneteenth	Channing Godfrey Peoples
2020	One Night in Miami...	Regina King
2020	Promising Young Woman	Emerald Fennell
2020	Sound of Metal	Darius Marder
2020	Tenet	Christopher Nolan
2020	The Trial of the Chicago 7	Aaron Sorkin
2021	Belfast	Kenneth Branagh
2021	CODA	Sian Heder
2021	Dune	Denis Villeneuve
2021	East of the Mountains	SJ Chiro
2021	King Richard	Reinaldo Marcus Green
2021	The Lost Daughter	Maggie Gyllenhaal
2021	The Power of the Dog	Jane Campion
2021	Spencer	Pablo Larraín
2022
2022	Top Gun: Maverick	Joseph Kosinski
2022	Avatar: The Way of Water	James Cameron
2022	Black Panther: Wakanda Forever	Ryan Coogler
2022	The Fabelmans	Steven Spielberg
2022	Living	Oliver Hermanus
2022	Tár	Todd Field
2022	Till	Chinonye Chukwu
2022	Women Talking	Sarah Polley
2023	Oppenheimer	Christopher Nolan
2023	Ferrari	Michael Mann
2023	Killers of the Flower Moon	Martin Scorsese
2023	Maestro	Bradley Cooper
2023	May December	Todd Haynes
2023	Past Lives	Celine Song
2024	The Brutalist	Brady Corbet
2024	Cabrini	Alejandro Gómez Monteverde
2024	Conclave	Edward Berger
2024	Dune: Part Two	Denis Villeneuve
2024	Nickel Boys	RaMell Ross
2024	The Order	Justin Kurzel
2024	Sing Sing	Greg Kwedar
2024	Young Woman and the Sea	Joachim Rønning
2025	Hamnet	Chloé Zhao
2025	Avatar: Fire and Ash	James Cameron
2025	Frankenstein	Guillermo del Toro
2025	One Battle After Another	Paul Thomas Anderson
2025	Sentimental Value	Joachim Trier
2025	Sinners	Ryan Coogler
2025	Train Dreams	Clint Bentley

=== Motion Picture (2011–2015) ===
Year	Film	Director(s)
2011	The Descendants	Alexander Payne
2011	The Artist	Michel Hazanavicius
2011	Drive	Nicolas Winding Refn
2011	The Help	Tate Taylor
2011	Hugo	Martin Scorsese
2011	Midnight in Paris	Woody Allen
2011	Moneyball	Bennett Miller
2011	Shame	Steve McQueen
2011	Tinker Tailor Soldier Spy	Tomas Alfredson
2011	War Horse	Steven Spielberg
2012	Silver Linings Playbook	David O. Russell
2012	Argo	Ben Affleck
2012	Beasts of the Southern Wild	Benh Zeitlin
2012	Les Misérables	Tom Hooper
2012	Life of Pi	Ang Lee
2012	Lincoln	Steven Spielberg
2012	Moonrise Kingdom	Wes Anderson
2012	Skyfall	Sam Mendes
2012	Zero Dark Thirty	Kathryn Bigelow
2013	12 Years a Slave	Steve McQueen
2013	All Is Lost	J. C. Chandor
2013	American Hustle	David O. Russell
2013	Blue Jasmine	Woody Allen
2013	Captain Phillips	Paul Greengrass
2013	Gravity	Alfonso Cuarón
2013	Inside Llewyn Davis	Joel and Ethan Coen
2013	Philomena	Stephen Frears
2013	Saving Mr. Banks	John Lee Hancock
2013	The Wolf of Wall Street	Martin Scorsese
2014	Birdman or (The Unexpected Virtue of Ignorance)	Alejandro G. Iñárritu
2014	Boyhood	Richard Linklater
2014	Gone Girl	David Fincher
2014	The Grand Budapest Hotel	Wes Anderson
2014	The Imitation Game	Morten Tyldum
2014	Love Is Strange	Ira Sachs
2014	Mr. Turner	Mike Leigh
2014	Selma	Ava DuVernay
2014	The Theory of Everything	James Marsh
2014	Whiplash	Damien Chazelle
2015	Spotlight	Tom McCarthy
2015	The Big Short	Adam McKay
2015	Black Mass	Scott Cooper
2015	Bridge of Spies	Steven Spielberg
2015	Brooklyn	John Crowley
2015	Carol	Todd Haynes
2015	The Martian	Ridley Scott
2015	The Revenant	Alejandro G. Iñárritu
2015	Room	Lenny Abrahamson
2015	Sicario	Denis Villeneuve

=== Motion Picture (Major / Independent) (2016–2017) ===
Year	Film	Director
2016	La La Land (Major)	Damien Chazelle
2016	Manchester by the Sea (Independent)	Kenneth Lonergan
2016	Captain Fantastic	Matt Ross
2016	Fences	Denzel Washington
2016	Hacksaw Ridge	Mel Gibson
2016	Hell or High Water	David Mackenzie
2016	Hidden Figures	Theodore Melfi
2016	Jackie	Pablo Larraín
2016	Lion	Garth Davis
2016	Loving	Jeff Nichols
2016	Moonlight	Barry Jenkins
2016	Nocturnal Animals	Tom Ford
2017	Three Billboards Outside Ebbing, Missouri (Major)	Martin McDonagh
2017	God's Own Country (Independent)	Francis Lee
2017	The Big Sick	Michael Showalter
2017	Call Me by Your Name	Luca Guadagnino
2017	Dunkirk	Christopher Nolan
2017	Get Out	Jordan Peele
2017	I, Tonya	Craig Gillespie
2017	Lady Bird	Greta Gerwig
2017	Mudbound	Dee Rees
2017	The Shape of Water	Guillermo del Toro

=== Independent (2018) ===
Year	Film	Director
2018	BlacKkKlansman	Spike Lee
2018	Eighth Grade	Bo Burnham
2018	First Reformed	Paul Schrader
2018	Leave No Trace	Debra Granik
2018	Private Life	Tamara Jenkins
2018	A Private War	Matthew Heineman

== See also ==
- BAFTA Award for Best Film
- Academy Award for Best Picture
- Independent Spirit Award for Best Film
- Critics' Choice Movie Award for Best Picture
- Golden Globe Award for Best Motion Picture – Drama
- Golden Globe Award for Best Motion Picture – Musical or Comedy
