= 26th Satellite Awards =

2022 awards ceremony for film and television

- Date: April 2, 2022

Highlights
- Most wins: Film: The Power of the Dog (5); Television: Mare of Easttown (3)
- Most nominations: Film: Belfast (13); Television: Mare of Easttown (5)
- Best Motion Picture – Drama: Belfast
- Best Motion Picture – Comedy or Musical: tick, tick... BOOM!
- Best Television Series – Drama: Squid Game
- Best Television Series – Comedy or Musical: Ted Lasso
- Best Miniseries & Limited Series: Mare of Easttown

The 26th Satellite Awards is an award ceremony honoring the year's outstanding performers, films and television shows, presented by the International Press Academy.

The nominations were announced on December 1, 2021. The winners were announced on April 2, 2022.

== Special achievement awards ==
- Auteur Award (for singular vision and unique artistic control over the elements of production) – Lin-Manuel Miranda
- Honorary Satellite Award – Jenifer Lewis
- Humanitarian Award (for making a difference in the lives of those in the artistic community and beyond) – Val Kilmer
- Mary Pickford Award (for outstanding artistic contribution to the entertainment industry) – Tom Skerritt
- Nikola Tesla Award (for visionary achievement in filmmaking technology) – Joan Collins Carey
- Breakthrough Performance Award – Artur Amanaliev (Shambala)
- Best First Feature – Halle Berry (Bruised)
- Stunt Performance Award – The Suicide Squad
- Ensemble: Motion Picture – The Power of the Dog
- Ensemble: Television – Succession

== Motion picture winners and nominees ==
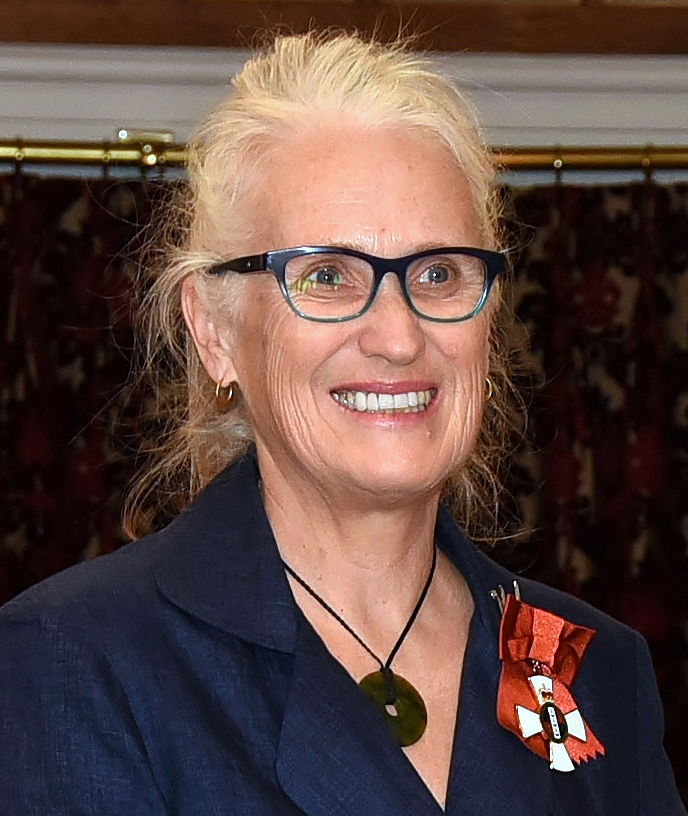
Jane Campion, Best Director winner

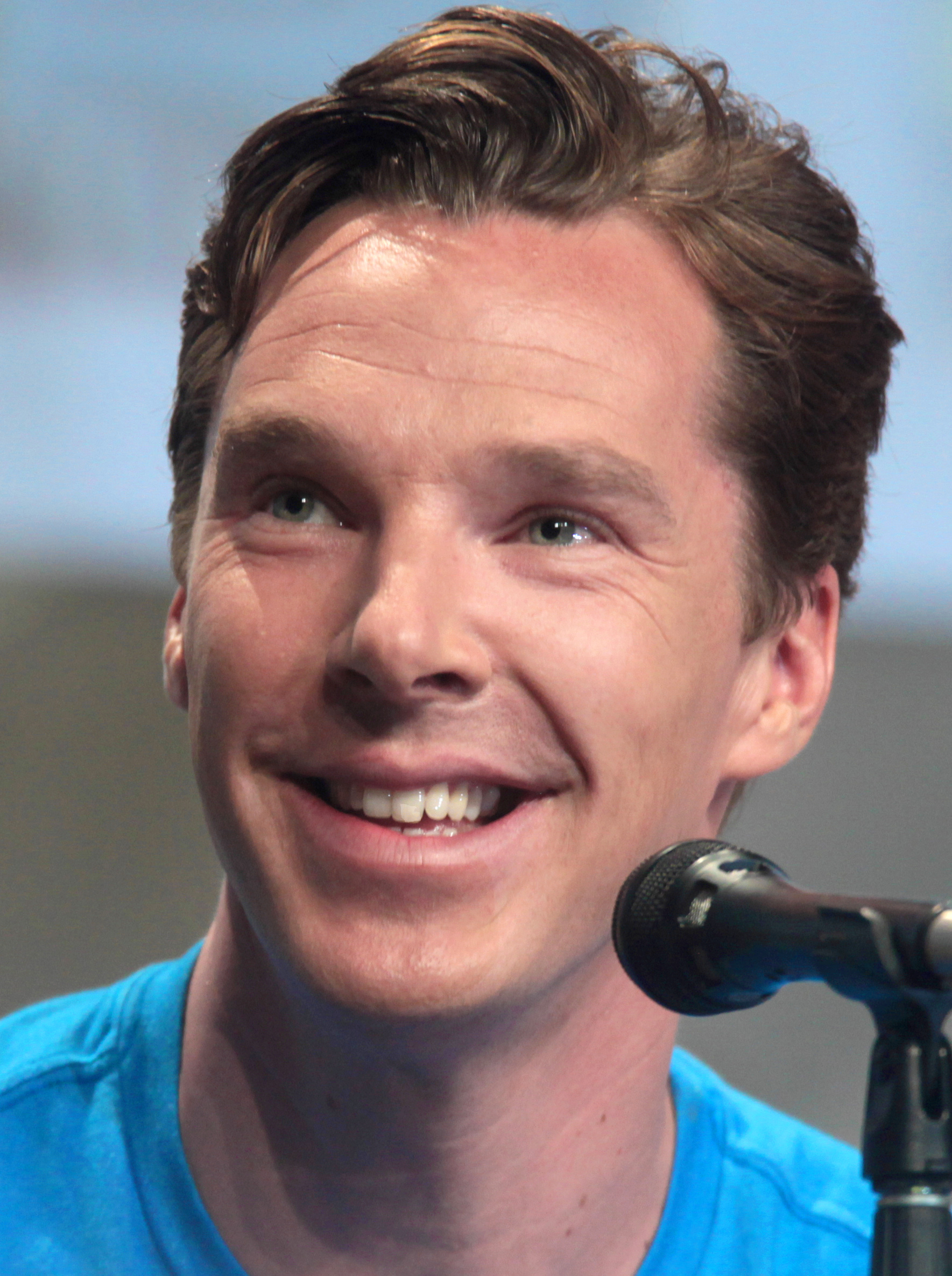
Benedict Cumberbatch, Best Actor in a Motion Picture – Drama winner

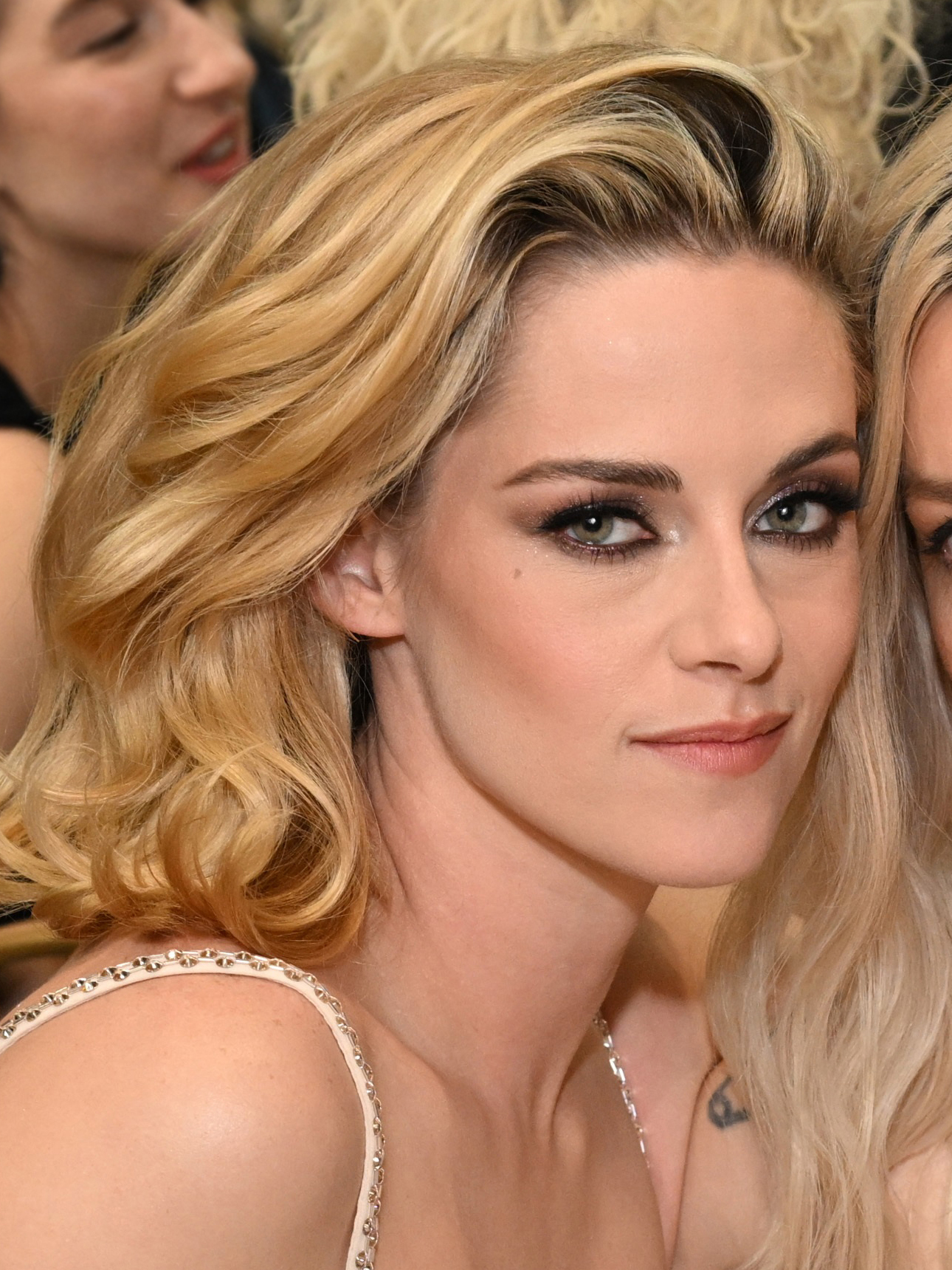
Kristen Stewart, Best Actress in a Motion Picture – Drama winner

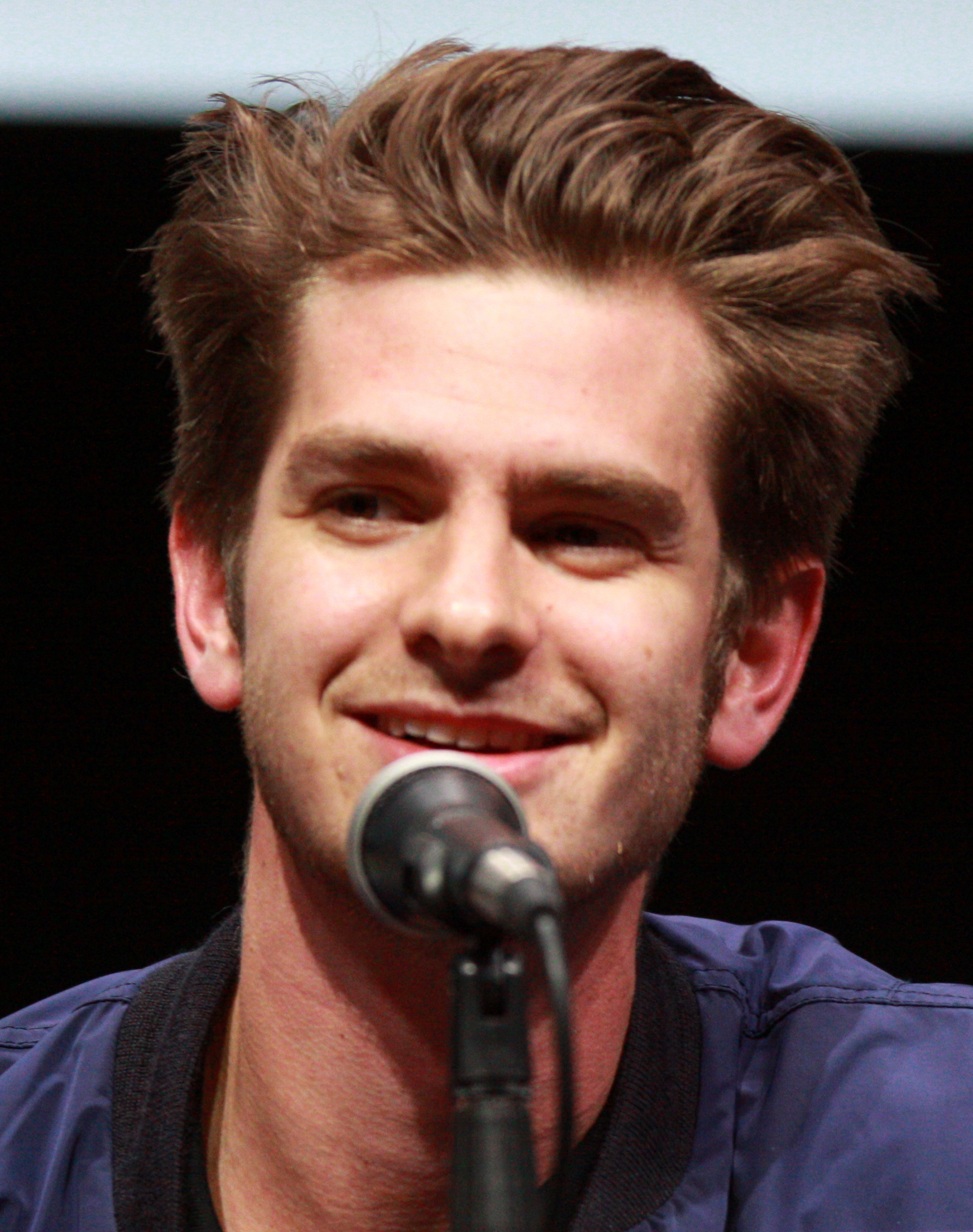
Andrew Garfield, Best Actor in a Motion Picture – Comedy or Musical winner

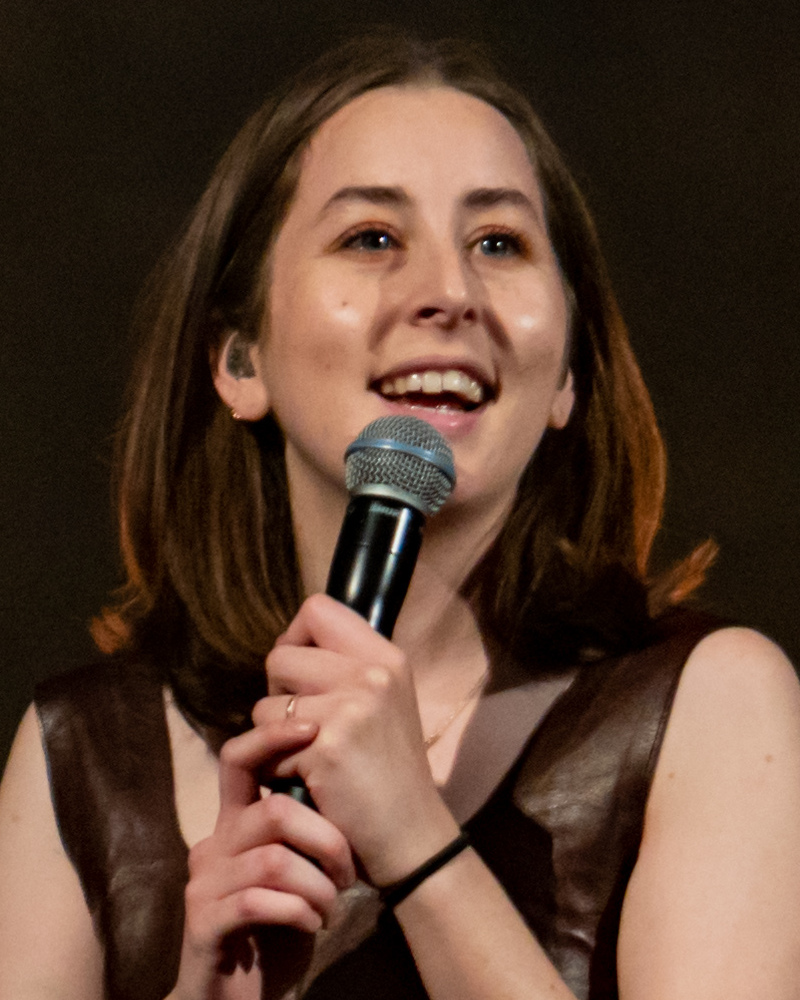
Alana Haim, Best Actress in a Motion Picture – Comedy or Musical winner

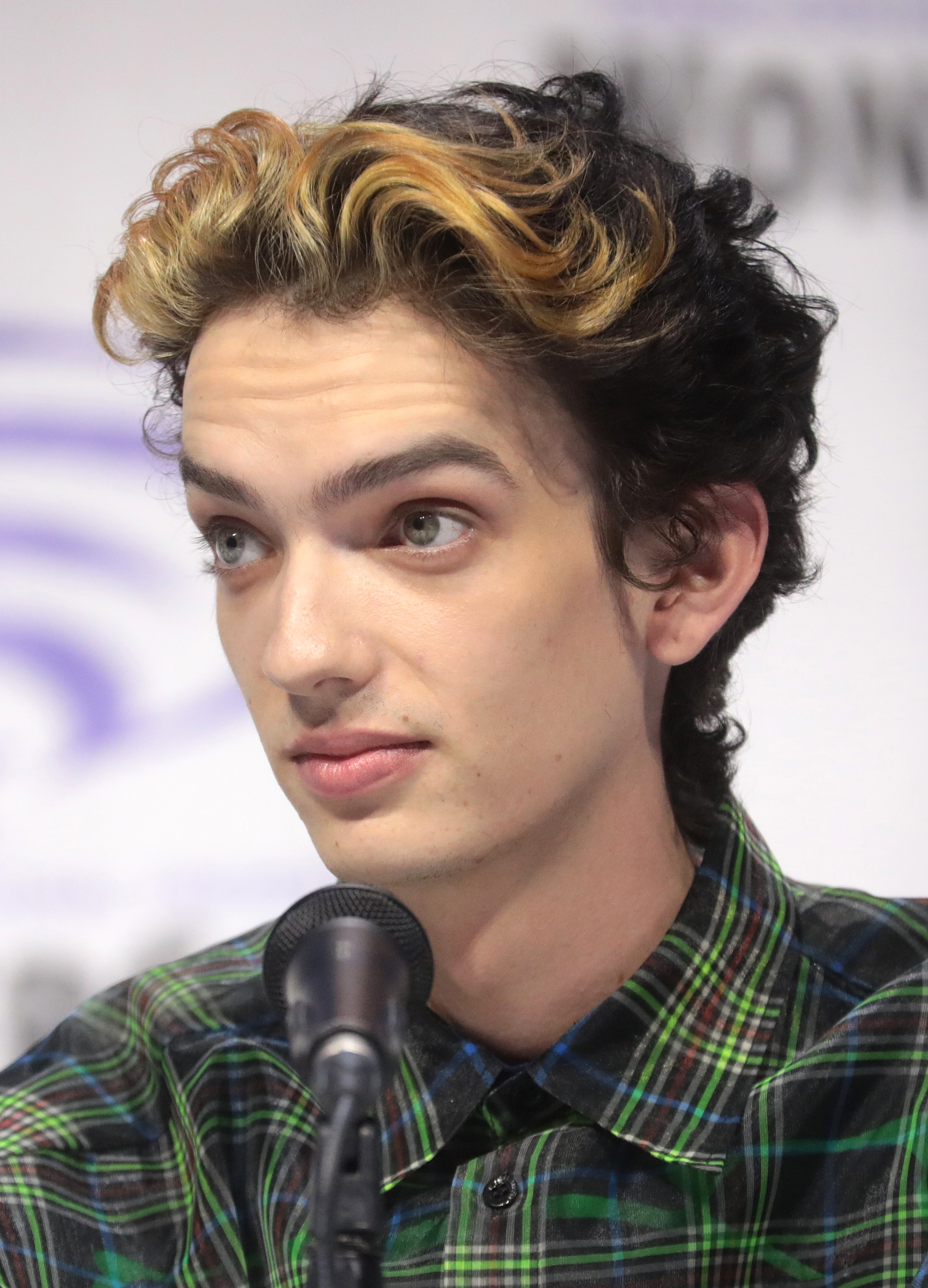
Kodi Smit-McPhee, Best Actor in a Supporting Role winner

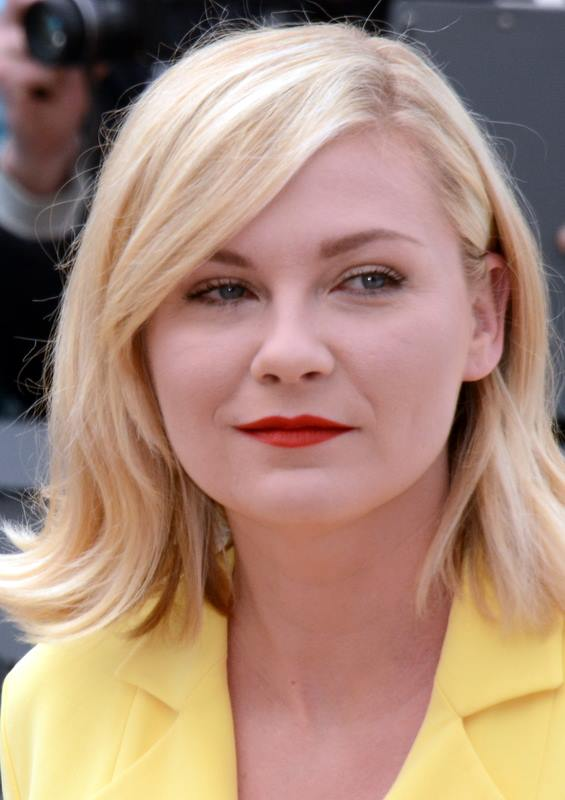
Kirsten Dunst, Best Actress in a Supporting Role winner

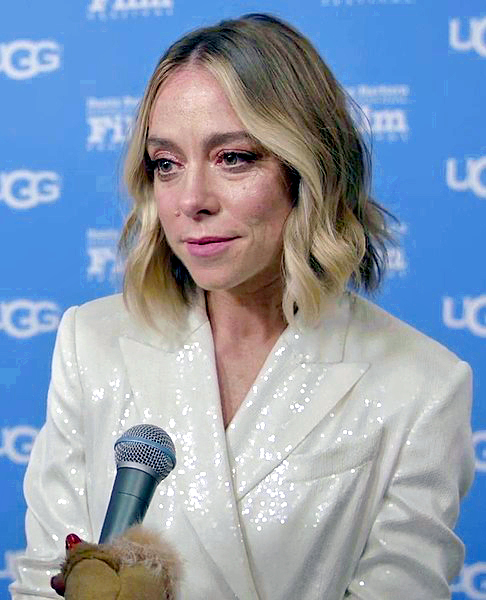
Sian Heder, Best Adapted Screenplay winner

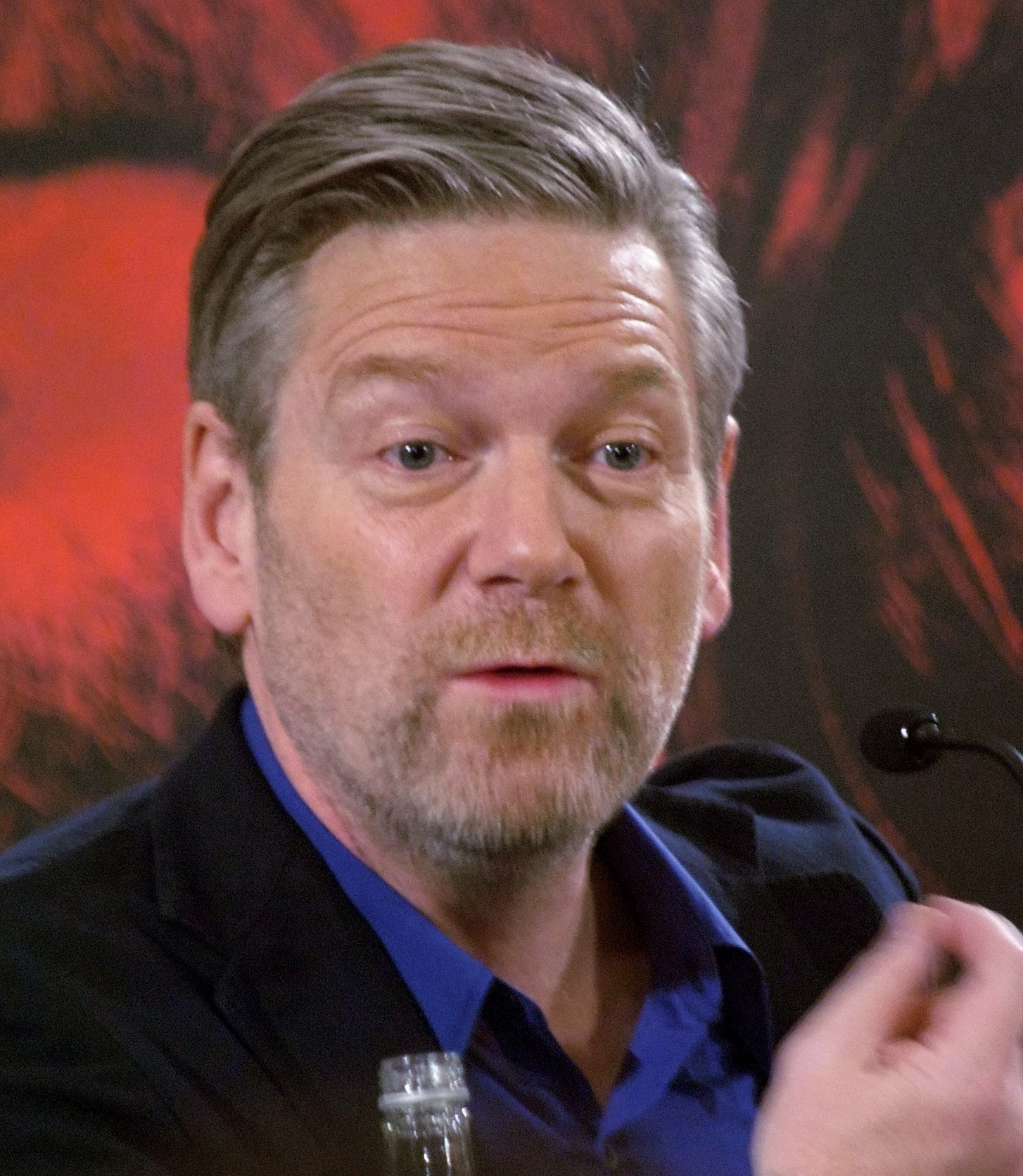
Kenneth Branagh, Best Original Screenplay winner

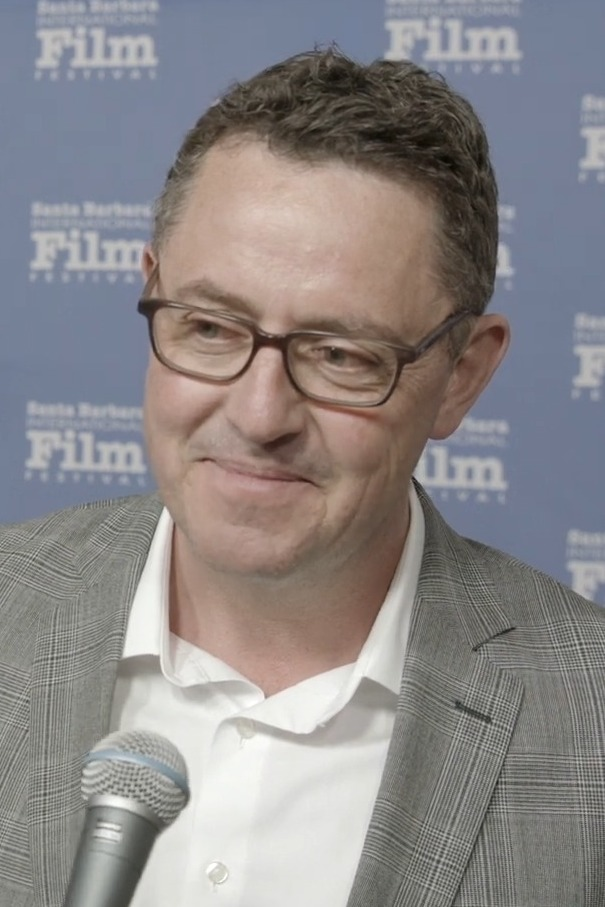
Greig Fraser, Best Cinematography winner

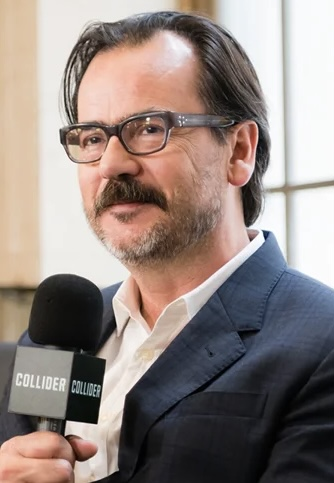
Joe Walker, Best Best Film Editing winner

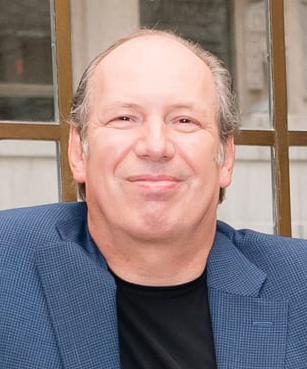
Hans Zimmer, Best Original Score winner

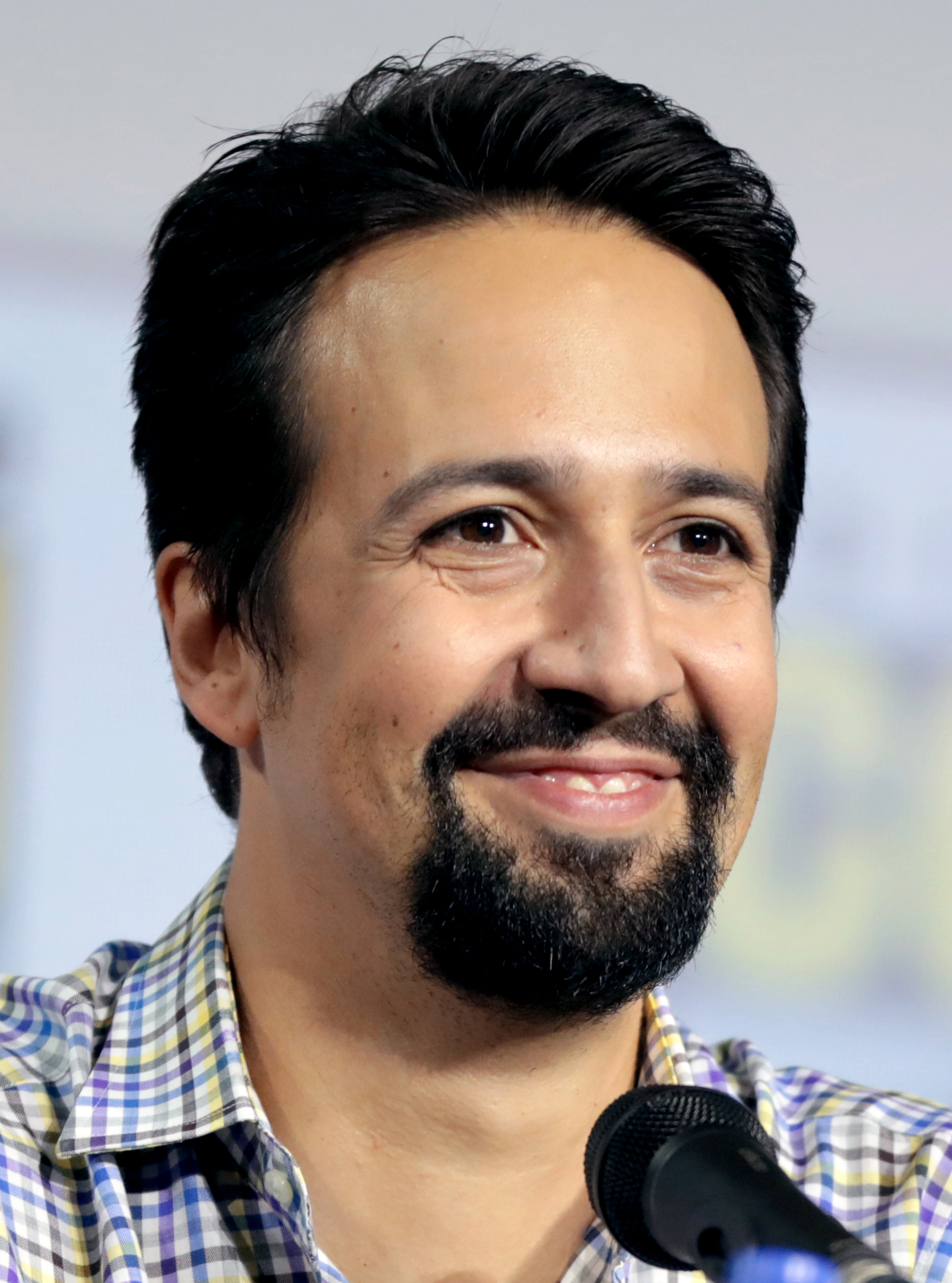
Lin-Manuel Miranda, Best Original Song winner

Winners are listed first and highlighted in bold.

Best Motion Picture – Drama	Best Motion Picture – Comedy or Musical
**Belfast**; CODA; Dune; East of the Mountains; King Richard; The Lost Daughter; The Power of the Dog; Spencer	**tick, tick... BOOM!**; Cyrano; The French Dispatch; In the Heights; Licorice Pizza; Respect
Best Motion Picture – Animated or Mixed Media	Best Director
**Encanto**; Flee; Luca; The Mitchells vs. the Machines; Vivo	**Jane Campion – The Power of the Dog**; Paul Thomas Anderson – Licorice Pizza; Kenneth Branagh – Belfast; Reinaldo Marcus Green – King Richard; Lin-Manuel Miranda – tick, tick... BOOM!; Denis Villeneuve – Dune
Best Actor in a Motion Picture – Drama	Best Actress in a Motion Picture – Drama
**Benedict Cumberbatch – The Power of the Dog as Phil Burbank**; Clifton Collins Jr. – Jockey as Jackson Silva; Joaquin Phoenix – C'mon C'mon as Johnny; Tom Skerritt – East of the Mountains as Ben Givens; Will Smith – King Richard as Richard Williams; Denzel Washington – The Tragedy of Macbeth as Lord Macbeth	**Kristen Stewart – Spencer as Diana Spencer**; Jessica Chastain – The Eyes of Tammy Faye as Tammy Faye Bakker; Olivia Colman – The Lost Daughter as Leda Caruso; Penélope Cruz – Parallel Mothers as Janis Martinez; Lady Gaga – House of Gucci as Patrizia Reggiani; Nicole Kidman – Being the Ricardos as Lucille Ball
Best Actor in a Motion Picture – Comedy or Musical	Best Actress in a Motion Picture – Comedy or Musical
**Andrew Garfield – tick, tick... BOOM! as Jonathan Larson**; Peter Dinklage – Cyrano as Cyrano de Bergerac; Anthony Ramos – In the Heights as Usnavi de la Vega	**Alana Haim – Licorice Pizza as Alana Kane**; Melissa Barrera – In the Heights as Vanessa; Jennifer Hudson – Respect as Aretha Franklin; Renate Reinsve – The Worst Person in the World as Julie
Best Actor in a Supporting Role	Best Actress in a Supporting Role
**Kodi Smit-McPhee – The Power of the Dog as Peter Gordon**; Robin de Jesús – tick, tick... BOOM! as Michael; Jamie Dornan – Belfast as Pa; Ciarán Hinds – Belfast as Pop; Jared Leto – House of Gucci as Paolo Gucci; J. K. Simmons – Being the Ricardos as William Frawley	**Kirsten Dunst – The Power of the Dog as Rose Gordon**; Caitríona Balfe – Belfast as Ma; Judi Dench – Belfast as Granny; Aunjanue Ellis – King Richard as Oracene "Brandy" Price; Marlee Matlin – CODA as Jackie Rossi; Ruth Negga – Passing as Clare Bellew
Best Original Screenplay	Best Adapted Screenplay
**Belfast – Kenneth Branagh**; C'mon C'mon – Mike Mills; A Hero – Asghar Farhadi; Licorice Pizza – Paul Thomas Anderson; Parallel Mothers – Pedro Almodóvar; King Richard – Zach Baylin	**CODA – Sian Heder**; Dune – Eric Roth, Jon Spaihts, and Denis Villeneuve; The Lost Daughter – Maggie Gyllenhaal; Passing – Rebecca Hall and Nella Larsen; The Power of the Dog – Jane Campion; The Tragedy of Macbeth – Joel Coen
Best Motion Picture – Documentary	Best Motion Picture – International
**Summer of Soul (...Or, When the Revolution Could Not Be Televised)**; Ascension; Brian Wilson: Long Promised Road; Flee; Introducing, Selma Blair; Julia; Procession; The Rescue; Val; The Velvet Underground	**Drive My Car (Japan)**; Compartment No. 6 (Finland); Flee (Denmark); The Good Boss (Spain); The Hand of God (Italy); A Hero (Iran); Prayers for the Stolen (Mexico); Titane (France); The Worst Person in the World (Norway)
Best Cinematography	Best Film Editing
**Dune – Greig Fraser**; Belfast – Haris Zambarloukos; C'mon C'mon – Robbie Ryan; The Power of the Dog – Ari Wegner; tick, tick... BOOM! – Alice Brooks; The Tragedy of Macbeth – Bruno Delbonnel	**Dune – Joe Walker**; Belfast – Úna Ní Dhonghaíle; King Richard – Pamela Martin; Licorice Pizza – Andy Jurgensen; The Power of the Dog – Peter Sciberras; tick, tick... BOOM! – Myron Kerstein and Andrew Weisblum
Best Art Direction and Production Design	Best Costume Design
**The Tragedy of Macbeth – Stefan Dechant**; Belfast – Jim Clay and Claire Nia Richards; Dune – Richard Roberts, Zsuzsanna Sipos, and Patrice Vermette; The French Dispatch – Rena DeAngelo and Adam Stockhausen; The Power of the Dog – Grant Major and Amber Richards; Spencer – Guy Hendrix Dyas and Yesim Zolan	**Cyrano – Massimo Cantini Parrini**; Belfast – Charlotte Walter; Coming 2 America – Ruth E. Carter; Dune – Jacqueline West and Robert Morgan; The Power of the Dog – Kirsty Cameron; Spencer – Jacqueline Durran
Best Original Score	Best Original Song
**Dune – Hans Zimmer**; The French Dispatch – Alexandre Desplat; The Harder They Fall – Jeymes Samuel; The Last Duel – Harry Gregson-Williams; Parallel Mothers – Alberto Iglesias; The Power of the Dog – Jonny Greenwood; Spencer – Jonny Greenwood	**"Colombia, Mi Encanto" from Encanto – Lin-Manuel Miranda**; "Be Alive" from King Richard – Beyoncé Knowles-Carter and DIXSON; "Beyond the Shore" from CODA – Nicholai Baxter, Matt Dahan, Marius de Vries, and Sian Heder; "Down to Joy" from Belfast – Van Morrison; "Here I Am (Singing My Way Home)" from Respect – Jamie Alexander Hartman, Jennifer Hudson, and Carole King; "No Time to Die" from No Time to Die – Billie Eilish and Finneas O'Connell
Best Sound (Editing and Mixing)	Best Visual Effects
**tick, tick... BOOM! – Paul Hsu and Tod A. Maitland**; Belfast – Niv Adiri, Simon Chase, James Mather, and Denise Yarde; Dune – Ron Bartlett, Theo Green, Doug Hemphill, Mark Mangini, and Mac Ruth; The Harder They Fall – Ron Bartlett, Clint Bennett, Doug Hemphill, Richard King, and Anthony Ortiz; The Last Duel – Daniel Birch, Stéphane Bucher, David Giammarco, Paul Massey, William Miller, and Oliver Tarney; The Power of the Dog – Richard Flynn, Leah Katz, Robert Mackenzie, Tara Webb, and Dave Whitehead	**Dune – Brian Connor, Paul Lambert, Tristan Myles, and Gerd Nefzer**; Eternals – Matt Aitken, Daniele Bigi, Stéphane Ceretti, and Neil Corbould; Godzilla vs. Kong – John Desjardin, Bryan Hirota, Tamara Watts Kent, and Kevin Smith; Shang-Chi and the Legend of the Ten Rings – Joe Farrell, Dan Oliver, Christopher Townsend, and Sean Noel Walker; The Suicide Squad – Jonathan Fawkner, Kelvin McIlwain, Dan Sudick, and Guy Williams; The Tomorrow War – Carmelo Leggiero, James E. Price, J. D. Schwalm, Randall Starr, and Sheldon Stopsack

=== Films with multiple nominations ===
Nominations	Films
13	Belfast
12	The Power of the Dog
10	Dune
7	King Richard
7	tick, tick... BOOM!
5	Licorice Pizza
5	Spencer
4	CODA
4	The Tragedy of Macbeth
3	C'mon C'mon
3	Cyrano
3	Flee
3	The French Dispatch
3	In the Heights
3	The Lost Daughter
3	Parallel Mothers
3	Respect
2	Being the Ricardos
2	East of the Mountains
2	Encanto
2	The Harder They Fall
2	A Hero
2	House of Gucci
2	The Last Duel
2	Passing
2	The Worst Person in the World

=== Films with multiple wins ===
Wins	Films
5	The Power of the Dog
4	Dune
3	tick, tick... BOOM!
2	Belfast
2	Encanto

== Television winners and nominees ==
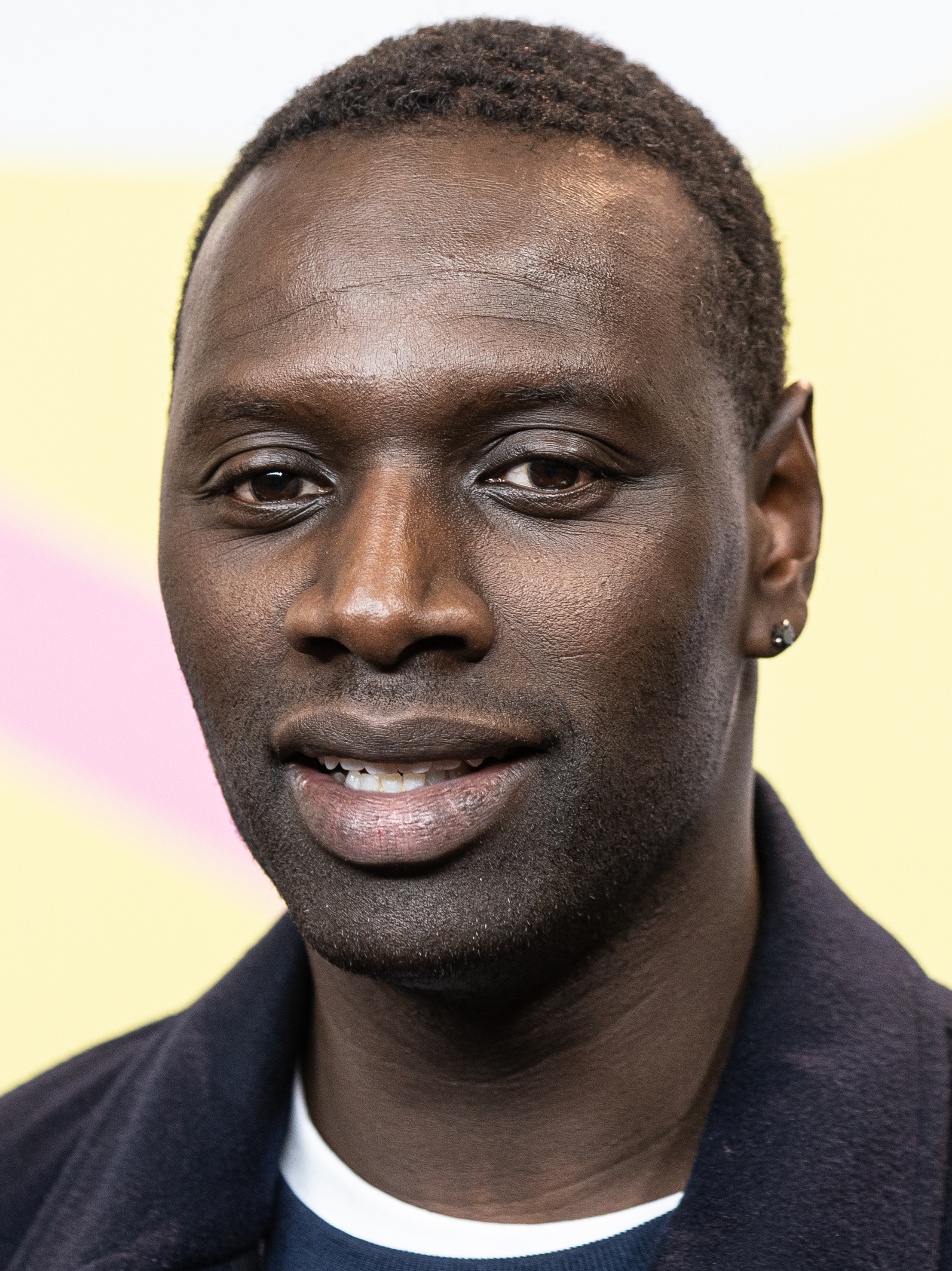
Omar Sy, Best Actor in a Drama / Genre Series winner

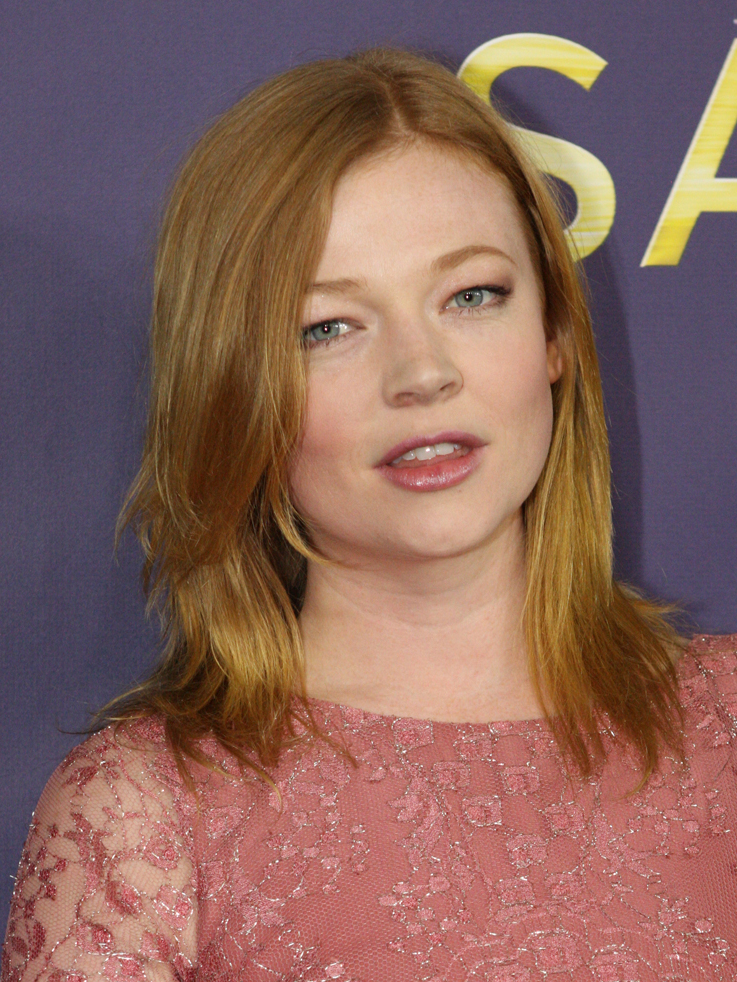
Sarah Snook, Best Actress in a Drama / Genre Series winner

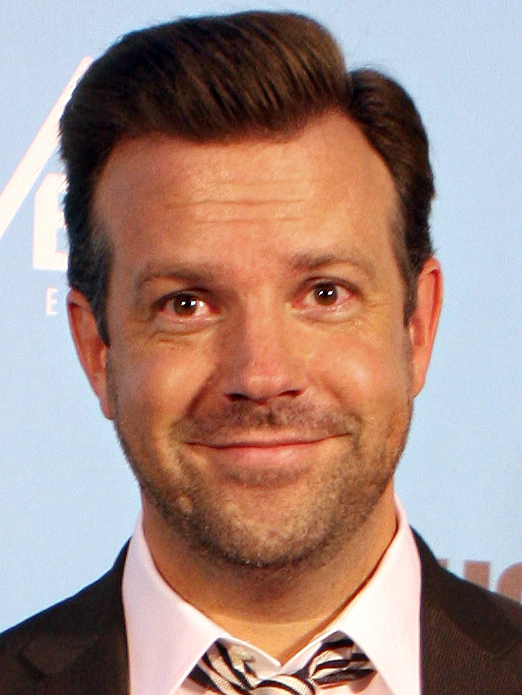
Jason Sudeikis, Best Actor in a Comedy or Musical Series winner

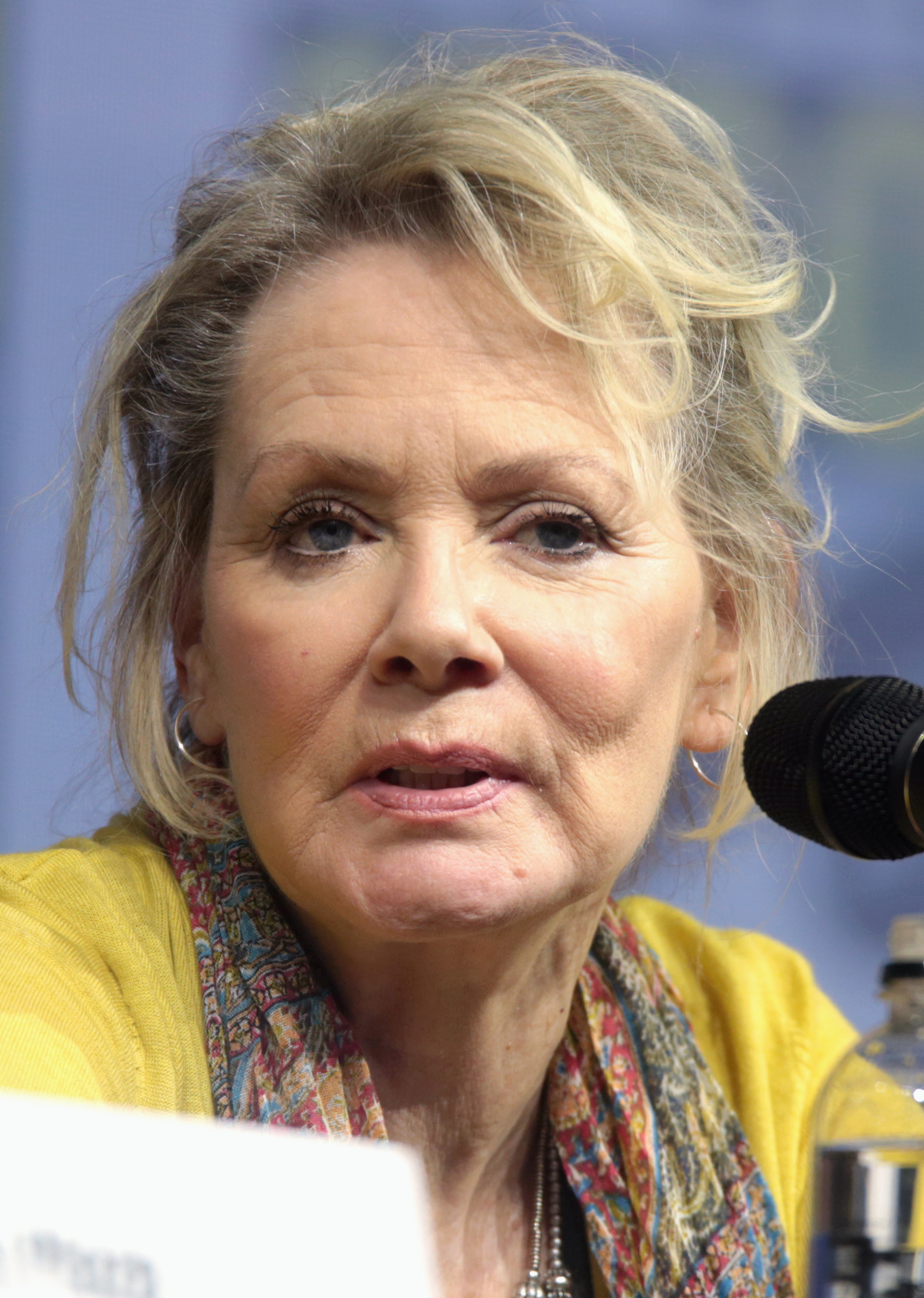
Jean Smart, Best Actress in a Comedy or Musical Series winner

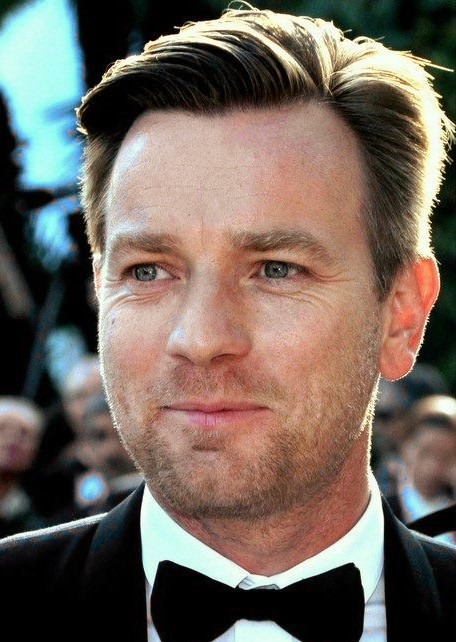
Ewan McGregor, Best Actor in a Miniseries, Limited Series, or Motion Picture Made for Television winner

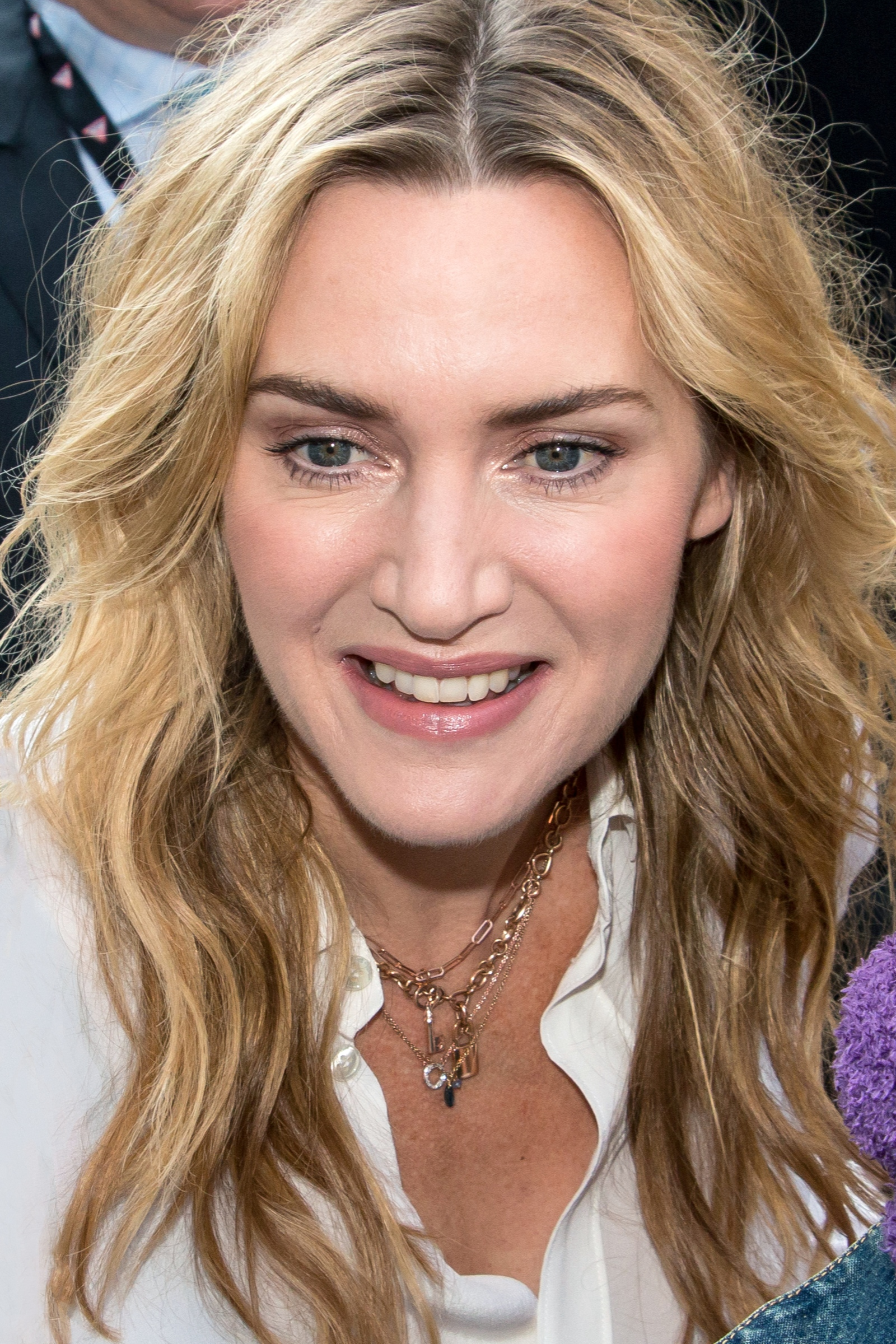
Kate Winslet, Best Actress in a Miniseries, Limited Series, or Motion Picture Made for Television winner

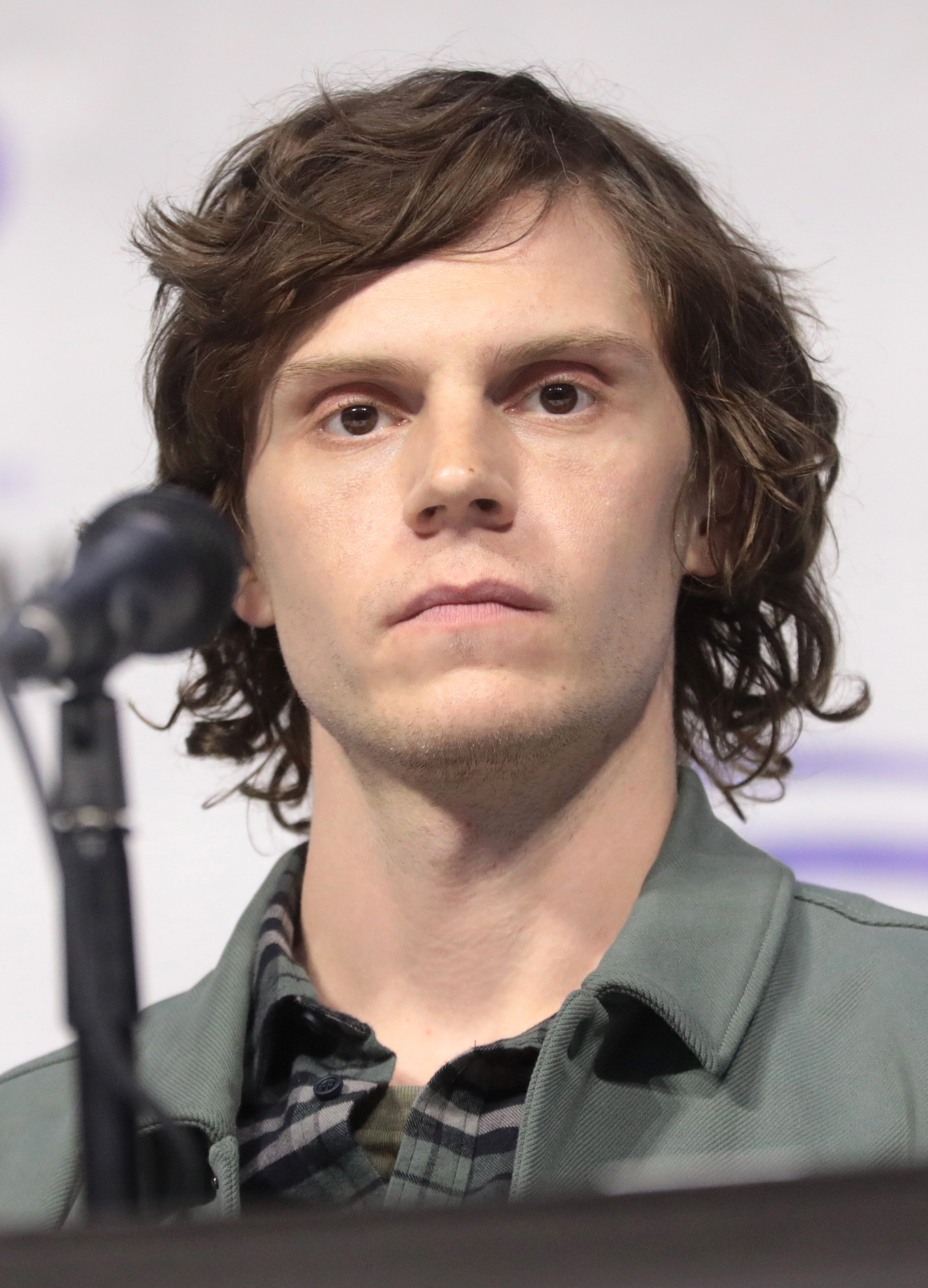
Evan Peters, Best Actor in a Supporting Role in a Series, Miniseries, Limited Series, or Motion Picture Made for Television winner

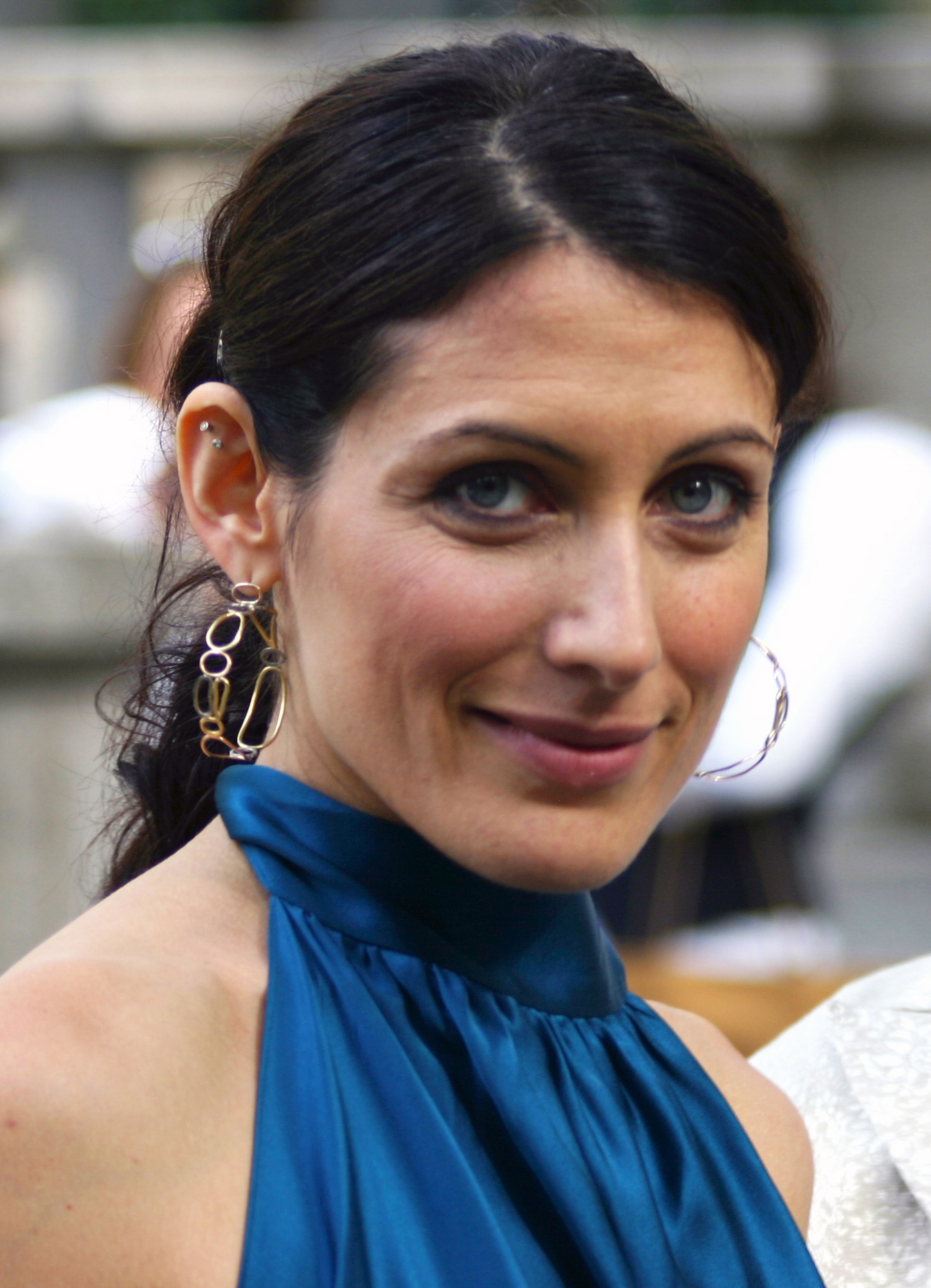
Lisa Edelstein, Best Actress in a Supporting Role in a Series, Miniseries, Limited Series, or Motion Picture Made for Television winner

Winners are listed first and highlighted in bold.

Best Drama Series	Best Comedy or Musical Series
**Squid Game (Netflix)**; American Rust (Showtime); Bosch (Prime Video); The Boys (Prime Video); In Treatment (HBO); Line of Duty (BBC One); Lupin (Netflix); Succession (HBO)	**Ted Lasso (Apple TV+)**; A Black Lady Sketch Show (HBO); The Chair (Netflix); Hacks (HBO Max); Help (Channel 4); The Kominsky Method (Netflix); Only Murders in the Building (Hulu); What We Do in the Shadows (FX)
Best Genre Series	Best Miniseries & Limited Series
**WandaVision (Disney+)**; Evil (CBS); Sweet Tooth (Netflix); Them (Prime Video)	**Mare of Easttown (HBO)**; It's a Sin (HBO Max); Maid (Netflix); The North Water (AMC+); Time (BBC One); The Underground Railroad (Prime Video)
Best Motion Picture Made for Television
**Oslo (HBO)**; Help (Channel 4); Robin Roberts Presents: Mahalia (Lifetime)
Best Actor in a Drama / Genre Series	Best Actress in a Drama / Genre Series
**Omar Sy – Lupin as Assane Diop (Netflix)**; Brian Cox – Succession as Logan Roy (HBO); Aldis Hodge – City on a Hill as Assistant District Attorney DeCourcy Ward (Showtime); James Nesbitt – Bloodlands as DCI Tom Brannick (Acorn TV); Jeremy Strong – Succession as Kendall Roy (HBO); Titus Welliver – Bosch as Harry Bosch (Prime Video)	**Sarah Snook – Succession as Siobhan "Shiv" Roy (HBO)**; Beanie Feldstein – Impeachment: American Crime Story as Monica Lewinsky (FX); Nicole Kidman – Nine Perfect Strangers as Masha Dmitrichenko (Hulu); Kelly Macdonald – Line of Duty as Joanne Davidson (BBC One); Elisabeth Moss – The Handmaid's Tale as June Osborne (Hulu)
Best Actor in a Comedy or Musical Series	Best Actress in a Comedy or Musical Series
**Jason Sudeikis – Ted Lasso as Ted Lasso (Apple TV+)**; Paul Bettany – WandaVision as Vision (Disney+); Michael Douglas – The Kominsky Method as Sandy Kominsky (Netflix); Jay Duplass – The Chair as Bill Dobson (Netflix); Steve Martin – Only Murders in the Building as Charles-Haden Savage (Hulu); Alan Tudyk – Resident Alien as Dr. Harry Vanderspeigle (Syfy)	**Jean Smart – Hacks as Deborah Vance (HBO Max)**; Selena Gomez – Only Murders in the Building as Mabel Mora (Hulu); Jennifer Jason Leigh – Atypical as Elsa Gardner (Netflix); Sandra Oh – The Chair as Ji-Yoon Kim (Netflix); Hannah Waddingham – Ted Lasso as Rebecca Welton (Apple TV+); Lena Waithe – Master of None as Denise (Netflix)
Best Actor in a Miniseries, Limited Series, or Motion Picture Made for Television	Best Actress in a Miniseries, Limited Series, or Motion Picture Made for Television
**Ewan McGregor – Halston as Halston (Netflix)**; Colin Farrell – The North Water as Henry Drax (AMC+); Stephen Graham – Help as Tony (Channel 4); Michael Keaton – Dopesick as Dr. Samuel Finnix (Hulu); Clive Owen – Impeachment: American Crime Story as President Bill Clinton (FX); Andrew Scott – Oslo as Terje Rød-Larsen (HBO)	**Kate Winslet – Mare of Easttown as Marianne "Mare" Sheehan (HBO)**; Danielle Brooks – Robin Roberts Presents: Mahalia as Mahalia Jackson (Lifetime); Jodie Comer – Help as Sarah (Channel 4); Cynthia Erivo – Genius: Aretha as Aretha Franklin (National Geographic); Julianne Moore – Lisey's Story as Lisey Landon (Apple TV+); Ruth Wilson – Oslo as Mona Juul (HBO)
Best Actor in a Supporting Role in a Series, Miniseries, Limited Series, or Motion Picture Made for Television	Best Actress in a Supporting Role in a Series, Miniseries, Limited Series, or Motion Picture Made for Television
**Evan Peters – Mare of Easttown as Detective Colin Zabel (HBO)**; Bobby Cannavale – Nine Perfect Strangers as Tony Hogburn (Hulu); John Carroll Lynch – Big Sky as Rick Legarski (ABC); Paul Reiser – The Kominsky Method as Martin (Netflix); Michael Shannon – Nine Perfect Strangers as Napoleon Marconi (Hulu)	**Lisa Edelstein – The Kominsky Method as Phoebe (Netflix)**; Jenifer Lewis – Black-ish as Ruby Johnson (ABC); Julianne Nicholson – Mare of Easttown as Lori Ross (HBO); Sarah Paulson – Impeachment: American Crime Story as Linda Tripp (FX); Anja Savcic – Big Sky as Scarlet Leyendecker (ABC); Jean Smart – Mare of Easttown as Helen Fahey (HBO)

=== Series with multiple nominations ===
Nominations	Series
5	Mare of Easttown
4	Help
4	The Kominsky Method
4	Succession
3	The Chair
3	Impeachment: American Crime Story
3	Nine Perfect Strangers
3	Only Murders in the Building
3	Oslo
3	Ted Lasso
2	Big Sky
2	Bosch
2	Hacks
2	Line of Duty
2	Lupin
2	The North Water
2	Robin Roberts Presents: Mahalia
2	WandaVision

=== Series with multiple wins ===
Wins	Series
3	Mare of Easttown
2	Succession
2	Ted Lasso
