= S. J. Chiro =

American screenwriter and Film director

- Born: Seattle, Washington
- Occupations: Film director, screenwriter

S. J. Chiro is an American screenwriter and film director. She made her feature film directing debut with Lane 1974 in 2017 and later directed East of the Mountains in 2021.

== Career ==
Chiro was born and raised in Seattle, Washington She graduated in theater and French literature from Bennington College.

Chiro started her career with short films Little Red Riding Hood (2006), Third Days Child (2008), A Water Tale (2009), The Epiphany (2011), and Howard from Ohio (2011).

Chiro adapted "The Hypocrisy of Disco: A Memoir" by Clane Hayward as Lane 1974, her award-winning and debut feature film. The film was produced by Chiro, and Jennessa West, and its cast include Sophia Mitri Schloss, Katherine Moennig, Sara Coates, Jasmin Savoy Brown, and Linas Phillips. It premiered at the 2017 SXSW, received positive reviews, and was distributed worldwide by The Orchard. Chiro used her own childhood experiences and spent nine years in making the 1970s-Northern California-set film.

Chiro directed East of the Mountains, starring Tom Skerritt, Mira Sorvino and Annie Gonzales. The film was released in 2021 and was nominated for 2 Satellite Awards, the film for Motion Picture, Drama and Tom Skerritt for Actor, Motion Picture Drama.

== Filmography ==
Year	Title	Director	Writer	Producer	Actress	Notes
2006	Little Red Riding Hood	Yes	Yes	Yes	No	Short film
2008	Third Days Child	Yes	Yes	Yes	No	Short film
2009	A Water Tale	Yes	Yes	Yes	No	Short film
2011	The Epiphany	Yes	Yes	No	No	Short film
2011	Howard from Ohio	Yes	Yes	Yes	No	Short film
2013	Lucky Them	No	No	No	Yes	
2013	Nothing Against Life	No	No	No	Yes	
2017	Lane 1974	Yes	Yes	Yes	No	Debut feature film, executive producer
2021	East of the Mountains	Yes	No	No	No	

== Awards ==
- 2017 New American Cinema Competition at the Seattle International Film Festival: Lane 1974
- 2017 Golden Space Needle Award nomination at the Seattle International Film Festival: Lane 1974
- 2017 SXSW Gamechanger Award nomination at the SXSW Film Festival: Lane 1974
- 2021 Best Feature Film Award at the Yale in Hollywood Fest: Lane 1974
- 2021 26th Satellite Awards Nomination East of the Mountains
