= Tom Skerritt =

American actor (1933–2026)

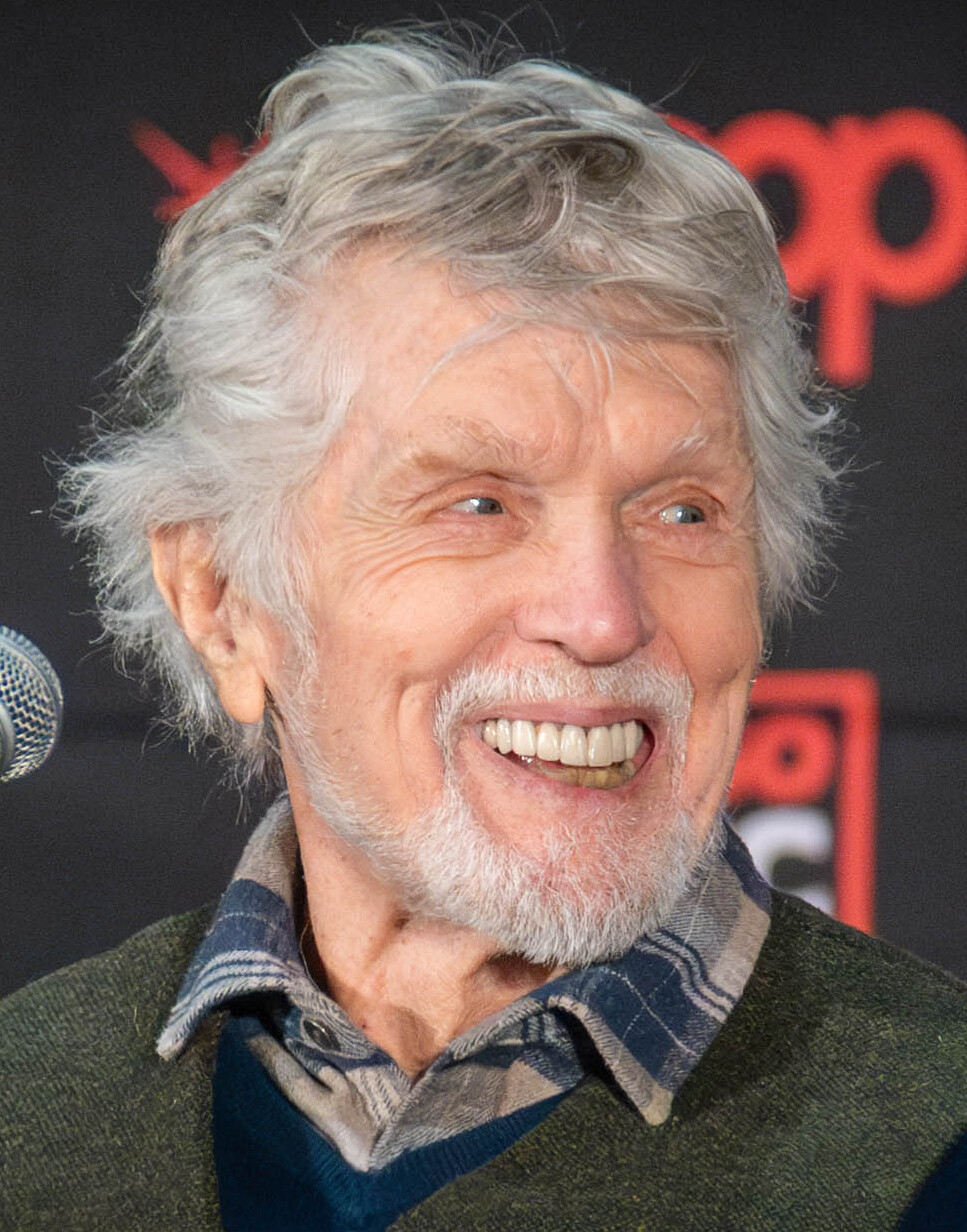
- Skerritt in 2024
- Born: Thomas Roy Skerritt; August 25, 1933; Detroit, Michigan, U.S.
- Died: October 21, 2026 (aged 93); Seattle, Washington, U.S.
- Occupations: Actor; director
- Years active: 1961–2026
- Spouses: Charlotte Shanks (m. 1957; div. 1972) Sue Oran (m. 1977; div. 1992) Julie Tokashiki (m. 1998)
- Children: 5
- Military service
- Branch: United States Air Force
- Service years: 1951–1955

Thomas Roy Skerritt (August 25, 1933 – October 21, 2026) was an American actor and director who appeared in over 170 film and television productions between 1962 and 2025. The beginning of his film career coincided with the New Hollywood movement, with a breakthrough role as Duke Forrest in M*A*S*H (1970). He then starred in notable films like The Turning Point (1977), Up in Smoke (1978), Ice Castles (1978), Alien (1979), The Dead Zone (1983), Top Gun (1986), SpaceCamp (1986), Steel Magnolias (1989), and A River Runs Through It (1992).

On television, Skerritt played the leading role of Sheriff Jimmy Brock on the family drama Picket Fences (1992–1996), earning a Primetime Emmy Award for Outstanding Lead Actor in a Drama Series, as well as two Golden Globe Award nominations. He also had a recurring role as Evan Drake on the sixth season of the sitcom Cheers (1987–1988).

Skerritt was also a three-time Screen Actors Guild Award nominee, a Genie Award nominee, an American Television Award nominee, and was both a Saturn Award and Western Heritage Award winner. In 2022, he received the International Press Academy's honorary Mary Pickford Award for "Outstanding Artistic Contribution to the Entertainment Industry."

== Early life ==
Skerritt was born in Detroit, Michigan, on August 25, 1933, the son of Helen, a homemaker, and Roy Skerritt, a businessman. He was the youngest of three children. A 1951 graduate of Detroit's Mackenzie High School, Skerritt enlisted just after graduating from high school, serving a four-year tour of duty in the United States Air Force as a classifications specialist. Most of his enlistment was spent at Bergstrom Field, Austin, Texas.

After his service, Skerritt attended Henry Ford College and Wayne State University before entering the University of California, Los Angeles. He had initial interests in majoring in English but veered towards directing. It was his appearance in a production of The Rainmaker that got Skerritt noticed to act in his first feature film. He left UCLA without a degree to pursue an acting career.

== Career ==
Skerritt made his film debut in War Hunt, produced by Terry Sanders and released in 1962. He played a guest part in Ray Walston's show My Favorite Martian in the 1963 episode "Mrs. Jekyll and Hyde" (Walston was a regular cast member thirty years later in Skerritt's show Picket Fences). He also guest-starred in the television series The Real McCoys (1963), as a letter carrier in the episode "Aunt Win Steps In". Skerritt appeared in the ABC series Twelve O'Clock High (1964–1967, five episodes) and Gunsmoke (1965–1972, also five episodes). He was cast in Bonanza in 1964 and in Death Valley Days in 1965, as a young gambler, Patrick Hogan, who meets a tragic fate after winning a small fortune in a saloon. In another Death Valley Days episode, "A Sense of Justice" (1966), he played a young Roy Bean with his elder brother, Joshua Bean, played by Tris Coffin. In a later Death Valley Days role, Skerritt played Mark Twain in the 1968 episode "Ten Day Millionaires", with Dabney Coleman as Twain's mining partner, Calvin H. Higby. The two lose a fortune in gold, but Twain learns his future is in writing. In 1972, Skerritt guest-starred in an episode of Cannon, titled "Nobody Beats the House", playing the role of a young gambler. In 1974, Skerritt portrayed Senator Robert Palmer in "The Devil's Platform", episode 7 of Kolchak: The Night Stalker. In 1975, he guest-starred in another episode of Cannon titled "The Conspirators", playing the role of the corrupt sheriff.

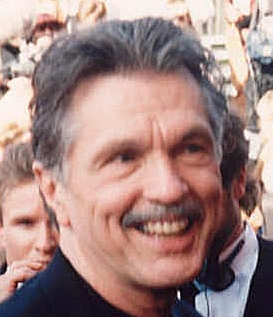
Skerritt in 1994

Skerritt's notable film appearances include his breakthrough role as Duke Forrest in Robert Altman's M*A*S*H (1970), Harold and Maude (credited as "M. Borman", 1971), Fuzz (1972), Big Bad Mama (1974), the husband of Shirley MacLaine's character in The Turning Point (1977), Strawberry in Cheech & Chong's Up in Smoke (1978), Ice Castles (1978), Captain Dallas in Alien (1979), Sheriff George Bannerman in The Dead Zone (1983), a former astronaut in SpaceCamp (1986), and Commander Mike "Viper" Metcalf in Top Gun (1986). In 1988, he starred with Nancy Allen and Lara Flynn Boyle in Poltergeist III. In 1989, he played the role of Thomas Drummond "Drum" Eatenton in Steel Magnolias. In 1992, he appeared in the critically-acclaimed Robert Redford-directed film A River Runs Through It, playing a fly fishing-loving minister and father of the two protagonist brothers in the film. In 1997, Skerritt played a would-be astronaut in the science-fiction film Contact. His agent, Meyer Mishkin, recounted in a 1978 Los Angeles Times profile that Skerritt was relegated to a series of obscure European westerns after his early 1970s film success. Mishkin took credit for obtaining for Skerritt his co-starring role in The Turning Point, effectively salvaging his career, and earning him a Best Supporting Actor National Board of Review Award in the process.

Skerritt appeared as Evan Drake on the sixth season of Cheers (1987–1988). He was a series regular on CBS's Picket Fences (1992–1996), in the role of Sheriff Jimmy Brock, for which he won an Emmy Award.

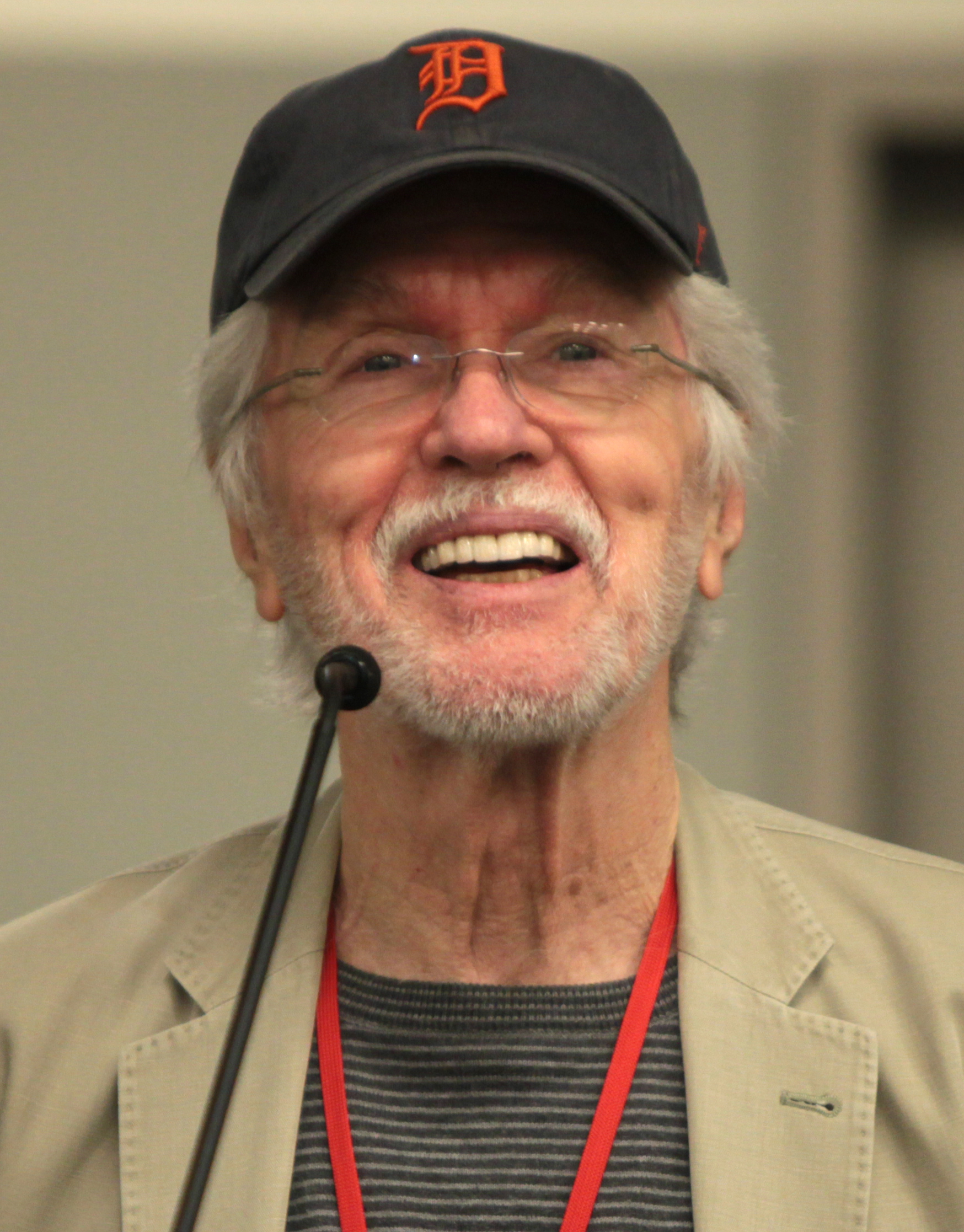
Skerritt in 2014

He portrayed the deceased William Walker on Brothers & Sisters (2006-2009), having appeared in the pilot and several flashbacks scenes. This was his second time playing the husband of a character played by Sally Field; the first was in Steel Magnolias.

Skerritt played the role of Ezekiel on ABC Family's miniseries Fallen alongside Paul Wesley. He also appeared as the guide on the showcase website for Microsoft's Windows Vista operating system. He lent his voice in the video game Gun (2005), in which he voiced Clay Allison. He then guest-starred in seasons three and four of Leverage as Nate Ford's father.

In February 2012, Skerritt played the title role in Pacific Northwest Ballet's production of Don Quixote. In 2014, Skerritt was reunited with his ex-Picket Fences co-star, Lauren Holly, to star with her in Field of Lost Shoes. He was reunited with his Alien co-star Harry Dean Stanton in Lucky (2017), the latter's final film.

== Personal life and death ==
Skerritt was the founder and chairman of Heyou Media, a Seattle-based digital media company.

From 1957 to 1972, Skerritt was married to Charlotte Shanks, with whom he had three children. He was married to Sue Oran, with whom he had a son, from 1977 to 1992. He married Julie Tokashiki in 1998. They had one daughter.

Skerritt died at his home in Seattle on October 21, 2026, at the age of 93.

== Filmography ==
=== Films ===
Year	Title	Role	Notes	Ref.
1962	War Hunt	Sergeant Stan Showalter		
1964	One Man's Way	Leonard Peal (Grown)		
1965	Those Calloways	Whit Turner		
1970	M*A*S*H	Captain Augustus Bedford "Duke" Forrest		
1971	Wild Rovers	John Buckman		
1971	Harold and Maude	Motorcycle Officer	Credited as M. Borman	
1972	Fuzz	Detective Bert Kling		
1974	Thieves Like Us	Dee Mobley		
1974	Run, Run, Joe!	Margherito		
1974	Big Bad Mama	Fred Diller		
1975	The Devil's Rain	Tom Preston		
1976	Plot of Fear	Chief Inspector		
1976	Sexycop	Rick Dylan		
1977	The Turning Point	Wayne Rodgers		
1978	Up in Smoke	Strawberry		
1978	Ice Castles	Marcus Winston		
1979	Alien	Captain Arthur Dallas		
1981	A Dangerous Summer	Howard Anderson		
1981	Savage Harvest	Casey		
1981	Silence of the North	Walter Reamer		
1982	Fighting Back	John D'Angelo		
1983	The Dead Zone	Sheriff George Bannerman		
1986	Top Gun	CDR Mike "Viper" Metcalf		
1986	SpaceCamp	Zach Bergstrom		
1986	Opposing Force	Logan		
1986	Wisdom	Lloyd Wisdom		
1987	Maid to Order	Charles Montgomery		
1987	The Big Town	Phil Carpenter		
1988	Honor Bound	Sam Cahill		
1988	Poltergeist III	Bruce Gardner		
1989	Big Man on Campus	Dr. Webster		
1989	Steel Magnolias	Drum Eatenton		
1990	The Rookie	Eugene Ackerman		
1992	Poison Ivy	Darryl Cooper		
1992	Knight Moves	Captain Frank Sedman		
1992	Wild Orchid II: Two Shades of Blue	Ham McDonald		
1992	A River Runs Through It	Reverend John Maclean		
1992	Singles	Mayor Weber		
1997	Contact	David Drumlin		
1998	Smoke Signals	Police Chief		
1999	The Other Sister	Dr. Radley Tate		
2001	Texas Rangers	Richard Dukes		
2002	Tuscaloosa			
2002	Changing Hearts	Johnny Pinkley		
2002	Greenmail	Tom Bradshaw	Direct-to-video release	
2003	Tears of the Sun	Captain Bill Rhodes		
2003	Swing	George Verdi		
2006	Bonneville	Emmett		
2006	Stephen King's Desperation	Johnny Marinville		
2007	The Velveteen Rabbit	Horse		
2008	Beer for My Horses	Sheriff Wilson Landry		
2009	Whiteout	Dr. John Fury		
2009	For Sale by Owner	Clive Farrier		
2009	Rivers of a Lost Coast	Narrator		
2010	Redemption Road	Santa		
2011	Your Love Never Fails	Jack		
2012	Ted	Himself		
2012	Soda Springs	Walt Jackson		
2012	Wings	Colonel		
2013	At Middleton	Dr. Roland Emerson		
2013	Redwood Highway	Pete		
2014	Field of Lost Shoes	Ulysses S. Grant		
2014	Wings: Sky Force Heroes	Colonel		
2016	A Hologram for the King	Ron Clay		
2017	Lucky	Fred		
2017	Day of Days	Mr. Walter		
2019	The Phantom 52	Trucker/Whale/Ghost	Animated short film	
2021	East of the Mountains	Ben Givens		
2021	Catch The Bullet	Dex		
2025	Broke	Cliff		

=== Television ===
Year	Title	Role	Notes	Ref.
1962–1967	Combat!	Soldier (uncredited); Glinski (uncredited); Hicks; Burke; Sergeant Decker	Episode: "Forgotten Front"; Episode: "A Day in June"; Episode: "The Prisoner"; Episode: "Losers Cry Deal"; Episode: "Nothing to Lose"; Episode: "The Gauntlet"	
1962–1971	The Virginian	Eric Kroeger; Reverend Paul Martin; Billy Landers; Moran; Rafe; Bobby Allen	Episode: "Impasse (aired 1962)"; Episode: "The Secret of Brynmar Hall"; Episode: "The Showdown"; Episode: "The Crooked Path"; Episode: "The Saddle Warmer"; Episode: "Nan Allen"	
1963	Laramie	Price	Episode: "No Place to Run"	
1963	The Real McCoys	Mailman	Episode: "Aunt Win Steps In"	
1963	The Alfred Hitchcock Hour	Dr. Frank Farmer	Episode: "Run for Doom"	
1963	My Three Sons	Young Steve	Episode: "The Proposals"	
1963–1968	Death Valley Days	Emmett Dalton; Dennis Driscoll; Patrick Hogan; Roy Bean; Sam Clemens	Episode: "Three Minutes to Eternity"; Episode: "Honor the Name Dennis Driscoll"; Episode: "The Book"; Episode: "Sense of Justice"; Episode: "Ten Day Millionaires"	
1964	Wagon Train	Hamish Browne	Episode: "The Last Circle Up"	
1964	My Favorite Martian	Dr. Edgar Edgarton	Episode: "Miss Jekyll and Hyde"	
1964–1967	12 O'Clock High	Lieutenant Ryan; Lieutenant Parmalee; Sergeant Ben Rodale; Lieutenant Paddy Gialella; Technical Sergeant Neely	Episode: "Soldiers Sometimes Kill"; Episode: "Those Who Are About to Die"; Episode: "The Came the Mighty Hunter"; Episode: "Twenty Fifth Mission"; Episode: "Long Time Dead"	
1964, 1973	Bonanza	Jerry; Corporal Bill Tanner	Episode: "Thanks for Everything, Friend"; Episode: "The Hunter"	
1965	Voyage to the Bottom of the Sea	Frank Richardson	Episode: "The Enemies"	
1965	Walt Disney's Wonderful World of Color	Corky Mardis	Episode: "...The Daily Press vs. City Hall"	
1965–1966	The Fugitive	Neely Hollister; Pete Edwards	Episode: "Nicest Fella You'd Ever Want to Meet"; Episode: "Joshua's Kingdom"	
1965–1972	Gunsmoke	Edmund Dano; Ben Stone; Orv Timpson; Fred Garth; Tuck Frye	Episode: "The Pretender"; Episode: "The Jailer"; Episode: "The Moonstone"; Episode: "The Noose"; Episode: "Jubilee"	
1966	The Time Tunnel	Matthew Gebhardt	Episode: "The Death Trap"	
1966–1972	The F.B.I.	Robert Hastings; John Clarence Rim; Thorn Hazard; Bill Leonard	Episode: "The Assassin"; Episode: "The Legend of John Rim"; Episode: "Unknown Victim"; Episode: "The Deadly Species"	
1967	Mannix	Morgan Carpenter	Episode: "Warning: Live Blueberries"	
1967	Hallmark Hall of Fame	Trapani	Episode: "A Bell for Adano"	
1968	Cimarron Strip	Enoch Shelton	Episode: "Knife in the Darkness"	
1968	Run for Your Life	Lou Patterson	Episode: "The Killing Scene"	
1968	Felony Squad	Gerald Gardner	Episode: "Matched for Murder"	
1969	The Outsider	Arnie Cambor	Episode: "A Bowl of Cherries"	
1969	Lancer	Bill Blake	Episode: "The Knot"	
1970	Hawaii Five-O	Lew Morgan	Episode: "Most Likely to Murder"	
1970	Medical Center	Artie Atwood	Episode: "Between Dark and Daylight"	
1970	The Name of the Game	Pete	Episode: "Cynthia Is Alive and Living in Avalon"	
1970	Bracken's World	Gil Dobie	Episode: "A Team of One-Legged Acrobats	
1971	Storefront Lawyers	Paul Marek	Episode: "This Money Kills Dreams"	
1971	The Birdmen	Orville "Fitz" Fitzgerald	ABC Television film	
1971	Nichols	Charley Doyle	Episode: "The Marrying Fool"	
1971–1975	Cannon	Dude; Toby Hauser; Sheriff Andrews	Episode: "The Salinas Jackpot"; Episode: "Nobody Beats the House"; Episode: "The Conspirators"	
1974	Get Christie Love!	Unknown	Episode: "Deadly Betrayal"	
1974	Kolchak: The Night Stalker	Senator Robert W. Palmer	Episode: "The Devil's Platform"	
1974	The Manhunter	Barry Richards	Episode: "Flight to Nowhere"	
1975	The Last Day	Bill Powers	NBC Television film	
1975	Barnaby Jones	Darrin Addison	Episode: "Image of Evil"	
1976	S.W.A.T.	Maynard Hill	Episode: "Dragons and Owls"	
1976	Sara	Newt Johnson	Episode: "The Child Bride"	
1976	Origins of the Mafia	Bernardino Campo	ITC miniseries; Episode: "La Speranza"	
1978	Baretta	Al Brimmer	Episode: "The Appointment"	
1978	Maneaters are Loose!	John Gosford	CBS Television film	
1983	Ryan's Four	Dr. Thomas Ryan	5 episodes	
1984	Calendar Girl Murders	Lieutenant Dan Stoner	ABC Television film	
1984	A Touch of Scandal	Father Dwelle	CBS Television film	
1986	Miles to Go...	Stuart Browning	CBS Television film	
1986	The Hitchhiker	Detective Frank Sheen	Episode: "True Believer"	
1986	The Parent Trap II	Bill Grand	ABC Television film	
1986	The Twilight Zone	Alex Mattingly	Episode: "What Are Friends For?"	
1986	Danger Bay	Don Bared	Episode: "The Fish Who Walks"; also directed 1 episode	
1987	Poker Alice	Jeremy Collins	CBS Television film Based on the frontier gambler Poker Alice, with Elizabeth Taylor in the lead role	
1987–1988	Cheers	Evan Drake	Episode: "A Kiss Is Still a Kiss"; Episode: "Tale of Two Cuties"; Episode: "Yacht of Fools"; Episode: "Let Sleeping Drakes Lie"; Episode: "The Sam in the Grey Flannel Suit"; Episode: "Backseat Becky, Up Front"	
1988	Moving Target	Joseph Kellogg	NBC Television film	
1988	Nightmare at Bittercreek	Ding	CBS Television film	
1989	The Heist	Ebbet Berens	HBO Television film	
1989	Red King, White Knight	Stoner	HBO Television film	
1990	The China Lake Murders	Sheriff Sam Brodie	Television film	
1990	Child in the Night	Bass	CBS Television film	
1990	ABC Afterschool Special	Jim	Episode: "A Question About Sex"; also director	
1990	She'll Take Romance	Judge Warren Danvers	ABC Television film	
1992	Getting Up and Going Home	Jack Montgomery	Television film	
1992	In Sickness and in Health	Jarrett Mattison	CBS Television film	
1992–1996	Picket Fences	Sheriff Jimmy Brock	87 episodes; also directed 3 episodes	
1993	Roseanne	Officer Carson	Episode: "The Driver's Seat"	
1997	Divided by Hate	Steve Riordan	USA Television film; also director	
1997	Chicago Hope	Jim Kellner	Episode: "Guns N' Roses"	
1997	What the Deaf Man Heard	Norm Jenkins	CBS Television film	
1998	Two for Texas	Sam Houston	TNT Television film	
1999	Into the Wild Blue	Host	History documentary	
1999	The Hunt for the Unicorn Killer	Fred Maddux	NBC miniseries	
1999	Aftershock: Earthquake in New York	Thomas Ahearn	CBS Television film	
2000	An American Daughter	Walter	Lifetime Television film	
2000	High Noon	Will Kane	TBS Television film	
2000	Jackie Bouvier Kennedy Onassis	Joseph P. "Joe" Kennedy	CBS Television film	
2001	Chestnut Hill	Daniel Eastman	Unsold TV pilot	
2001	The Voyage to Atlantis: The Lost Empire	Host	Short documentary	
2002	Path to War	General William Westmoreland	HBO Television film	
2002	Will & Grace	Dr. Jay Markus	Episode: "The Needle and the Omelet's Done"	
2003	Biography	Passages Read By	Episode: "Jack London—Forces of Nature"	
2003	The West Wing	Senator Chris Carrick	Episode:"Constituency of One"	
2004	Homeland Security	Admiral McKee	NBC Television film	
2004	Law & Order: Special Victims Unit	Judge Oliver Taft	Episode: "Poison"	
2004	The Grid	CIA Deputy Director Acton Sandman	TNT miniseries	
2005	Vinegar Hill	Fritz Grier	CBS Television film	
2005	Category 7: The End of the World	Colonel Mike Davis	CBS miniseries	
2006	Mammoth	Simon Abernathy	Sci-Fi Television film	
2006	Huff	Ben Huffstodt	Episode: "Red Meat"; Episode: "So...What Brings You to Armageddon?"; Episode: "Radio Silence"	
2006	Desperation	John Edward Marinville	ABC Television film	
2006	Fallen	Zeke	ABC miniseries	
2006–2009	Brothers & Sisters	William Walker	Episode: "Patriarchy (pilot)" Episode: "Mistakes Were Made (Part 1 & 2)"; Episode: "Love Is Difficult"; Episode: "Prior Commitments"; Episode: "Let's Call the Whole Thing Off"	
2007	Killer Wave	Victor Bannister	Miniseries	
2007	The Dead Zone	Herb Smith	Episode: "Denouement"	
2008	Tim and Eric Awesome Show, Great Job!	Himself	Episode: "Pepperoni"	
2008	Dr. Jekyll and Mr. Hyde	Gabe Utterson	Television film	
2008	The Trojan Horse	President Stanfield	CBC miniseries	
2010	Leverage	Jimmy Ford	Episode: "The Three Card Monte Job"	
2010	The Closer	Joey O.	Episode: "Elysian Fields"	
2011	A Valentines Date	Jack Connors	Hallmark Television film	
2012	Leverage	Jimmy Ford	Episode: "The Radio Job"	
2012	White Collar	Alan Mitchell	Episode: "Pulling Strings"	
2014	The Good Wife	James Paisley	Episode: "We, the Juries"; Episode: "The One Percent"	
2015	Madam Secretary	Patrick McCord	Episode: "Chains of Command"	
2016	Journey Back to Christmas	Tobias Cook	Television film	
2022	Going Home	Vance	Season 1, Episode 2, Pure Flix TV series	

=== Video games ===
Year	Title	Role	Notes	Ref.
2005	Gun	Clay Allison	Voice only	
2014	Alien: Isolation	Arthur Dallas	Voice (Nostromo Edition)	

== Awards and nominations ==
Association	Nominated work	Year	Category	Results	Ref.
American Television Awards	Picket Fences	1993	Best Actor in a Dramatic Series	Nominated	
Blockbuster Entertainment Awards	Contact	1998	Favorite Supporting Actor — Drama	Nominated	
DVD Exclusive Awards	Alien	2003	Best Audio Commentary (New for DVD) (for reissue – Alien Quadrilogy)	Won	
Emmy Awards (Primetime)	Picket Fences	1993	Outstanding Lead Actor in a Drama Series	Won	
Emmy Awards (Primetime)	Picket Fences	1994	Outstanding Lead Actor in a Drama Series	Nominated	
Genie Awards	Silence of the North	1982	Best Performance by a Foreign Actor	Nominated	
Golden Globes	Picket Fences	1994	Best Performance by an Actor in a Television Series — Drama	Nominated	
Golden Globes	Picket Fences	1995	Best Performance by an Actor in a Television Series — Drama	Nominated	
Key West Film Festival	Alien/The Phantom 52	2019	Career Achievement Award	Won	
National Board of Review Awards	The Turning Point	1977	Best Supporting Actor	Won	
Satellite Awards	East of the Mountains	2022	Best Actor in a Motion Picture, Drama	Nominated	
Satellite Awards	—N/a	2022	Mary Pickford Award	Won	
Saturn Awards	Leverage	2012	Best Guest Performance in a Television Series	Won	
Screen Actors Guild Awards	Picket Fences	1995	Outstanding Performance by a Male Actor in a Drama Series	Nominated	
Screen Actors Guild Awards	Picket Fences	1995	Outstanding Performance by an Ensemble in a Drama Series	Nominated	
Screen Actors Guild Awards	Picket Fences	1996	Outstanding Performance by an Ensemble in a Drama Series	Nominated	
Viewers for Quality Television Awards	Picket Fences	1993	Best Actor in a Quality Drama Series	Nominated	
Viewers for Quality Television Awards	Picket Fences	1994	Best Actor in a Quality Drama Series	Nominated	
Western Heritage Awards	Two for Texas	1999	Television Feature Film	Won	
