= East of the Mountains (film) =

- Theatrical poster for East of the Mountains
- Directed by: S. J. Chiro
- Written by: David Guterson (novel)
- Screenplay by: Thane Swigart
- Produced by: Jane Charles, Mischa Jakupcak
- Starring: Tom Skerritt; Mira Sorvino; Annie Gonzalez; Wally Dalton; John Paulsen
- Cinematography: Sebastien Scandiuzzi
- Edited by: Eric Frith
- Music by: Les Hall
- Release date: 2021
- Running time: 93 minutes
- Country: United States
- Language: English

East of the Mountains is a drama film directed by S. J. Chiro that premiered at the Seattle International Film Festival in April 2021. It opened in September 2021 in US cinemas. The film is based on the novel East of the Mountains by David Guterson.

== Plot ==
Retired cardiologist Ben Givens lives in Seattle and has recently become a widower. After being diagnosed with cancer, he decides to end his life. He tells his daughter Renee he's going bird hunting on the dry steppes east of the Cascade Mountains for a few days, or, as he puts it: "I want to go back to my old stomping grounds."

Ben drives to Eastern Washington with only a few belongings, his dog Rex, and a shotgun. On the way his SUV breaks down, but a couple of young rock climbers give him a ride to his destination. It was in this general region where he met and courted Rachel, the woman he would later marry, and the landscape is full of powerful memories which come back to haunt him.

== Cast ==
- Tom Skerritt as Ben Givens
  - Jule Johnson as Young Ben Givens
    - Levi Ralston as 10-Year-Old Ben Givens
- Mira Sorvino as Renee Givens
- Annie Gonzales as Dr. Anita Romero
- Wally Dalton as Aidan Givens
  - Dylan Boeshaar as Young Aidan Givens
- Donna Dannenmiller as Rachel Givens
  - Victoria Summer Felix as Young Rachel
- Diego Collie as Derek
- Lauren Du Pree as Christine (credited as Lauren Dupree)
- Nick Sage Palmieri as Kevin
- Sharva Maynard as Bea Harden
- Robert Fuentes as Roberto
- John Paulsen as Bill Harden
- Thurman Kellogg as Wright Givens
- Kevin Cole as Himself (voice) (credited as DJ Kevin Cole)
- Ozzy as Rex The Dog

== Production ==
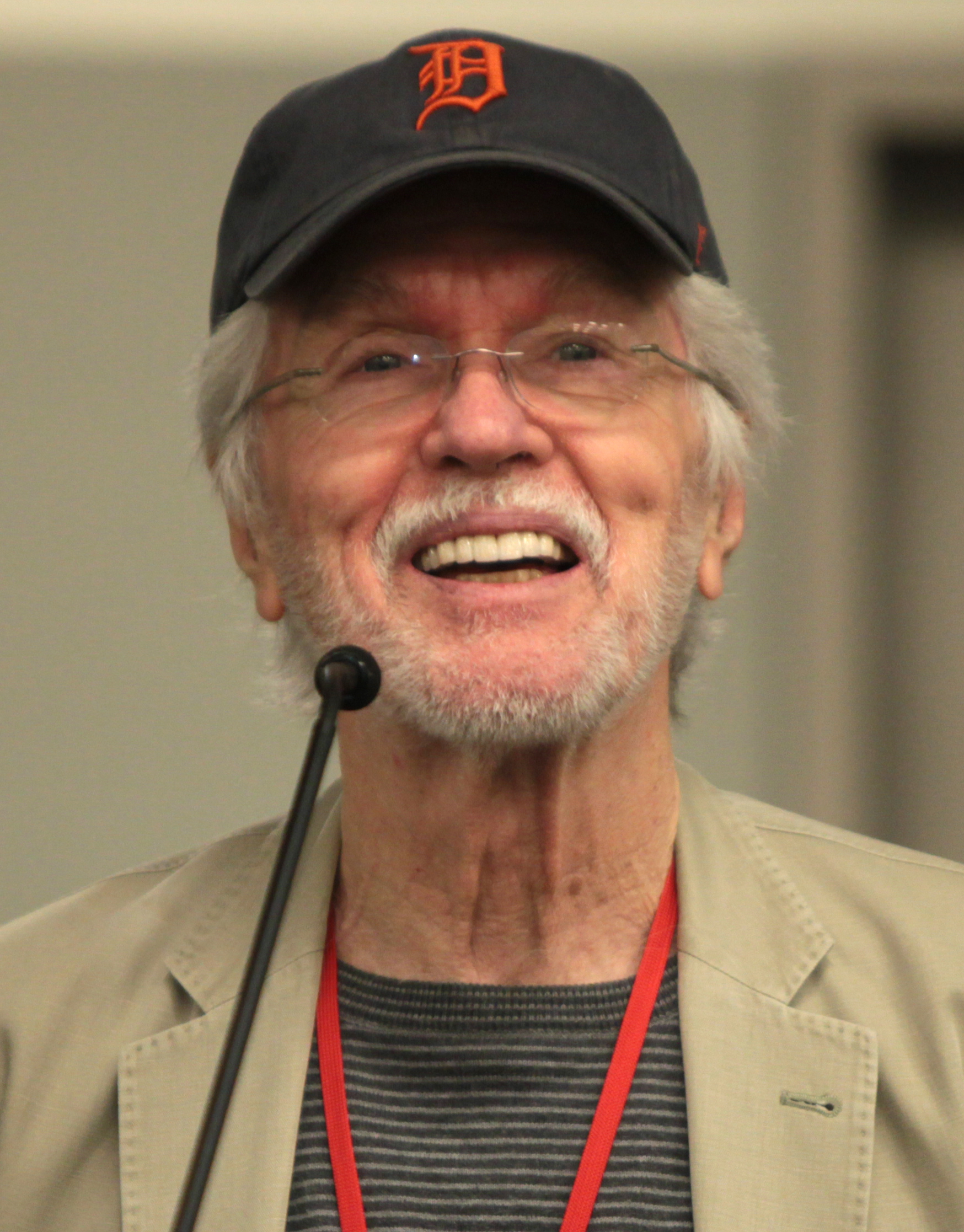
Tom Skerritt stars as Ben Givens

Thane Swigart adapted Guterson's novel for the film by. S. J. Chiro directed it. Sebastien Scandiuzzi was the cinematographer.

Tom Skerritt stars as Ben Givens. As a young man he is played by Jule Johnson. Victoria Summer Felix plays his late wife Rachel in flashbacks and Mira Sorvino plays their daughter Renee. Annie Gonzalez plays the veterinarian Anita Romero, to whom Ben brings his injured dog. Wally Dalton plays Ben's brother Aidan Givens.

The shooting took place between June and July 2019. After most of the scenes were filmed in Eastern Washington, including the Columbia Plateau, further filming took place in Seattle, specifically the Ballard and Wallingford districts starting at the end of June.

East of the Mountains had its first showing in April 2021 as part of the virtual Seattle International Film Festival. Tom Skerritt received the festivals Cinema Award. On September 24, the film had its US general release.

== Reception ==
All of the reviews recorded by Rotten Tomatoes have so far been positive with an average rating of 7.1 out of a possible 10 points.
