= List of accolades received by The Jungle Book (2016 film) =

The Jungle Book is a 2016 American fantasy adventure film directed and produced by Jon Favreau and written by Justin Marks. It was produced by Walt Disney Pictures. Starring Neel Sethi, with the voices of Bill Murray, Ben Kingsley, Idris Elba, Lupita Nyong'o, Scarlett Johansson, Giancarlo Esposito, and Christopher Walken, the film focuses on the story of Mowgli, an orphaned human boy who, guided by his animal guardians, sets out on a journey of self-discovery while evading the threatening Shere Khan.

The film was released in the United States on April 15, 2016. Rotten Tomatoes gave it an approval rating of 94%, based on 328 reviews.

== Accolades ==
Award	Date of ceremony	Category	Recipient(s)	Result	Ref.
AARP Annual Movies for Grownups Awards	February 6, 2017	Best Movie for Grownups who Refuse to Grow Up	The Jungle Book	Nominated	
Academy Awards	February 26, 2017	Best Visual Effects	Robert Legato, Dan Lemmon, Andrew R. Jones and Adam Valdez	Won	
American Cinema Editors Awards	January 27, 2017	Best Edited Feature Film – Comedy or Musical	Mark Livolsi	Nominated	
Annie Awards	February 4, 2017	Outstanding Achievement, Character Animation in a Live Action Production	Peta Bayley, Andrew R. Jones, Benjamin Jones and Gabriele Zucchelli	Won	
Annie Awards	February 4, 2017	Outstanding Achievement, Character Animation in a Live Action Production	Andrei Coval, Andrew R. Jones, Paul Story, Eteuati Tema and Dennis Yoo	Nominated	
Black Reel Awards	February 16, 2017	Outstanding Voice Performance	Idris Elba	Won	
Black Reel Awards	February 16, 2017	Outstanding Voice Performance	Lupita Nyong'o	Nominated	
British Academy Children's Awards	November 20, 2016	Feature Film	The Jungle Book	Nominated	
British Academy Children's Awards	November 20, 2016	BAFTA Kids' Vote	The Jungle Book	Nominated	
British Academy Film Awards	February 12, 2017	Best Special Visual Effects	Robert Legato, Dan Lemmon, Andrew R. Jones and Adam Valdez	Won	
Critics' Choice Movie Awards	December 11, 2016	Best Visual Effects	The Jungle Book	Won	
Empire Awards	March 19, 2017	Best Visual Effects	The Jungle Book	Nominated	
Florida Film Critics Circle	December 23, 2016	Best Visual Effects	The Jungle Book	Nominated	
Golden Trailer Awards	May 4, 2016	Best Animation Family	"Jungle"	Won	
Golden Trailer Awards	May 4, 2016	Best Original Score	"Mowgli"	Won	
Golden Trailer Awards	May 4, 2016	Best Animation/Family TV Spot	"Legend"	Won	
Golden Trailer Awards	May 4, 2016	Best Original Score TV Spot	"Legend"	Won	
Golden Trailer Awards	May 4, 2016	Best Fantasy Adventure TV Spot	"Relax"	Nominated	
Golden Trailer Awards	May 4, 2016	Best Fantasy Adventure	"Man Cub Combo"	Nominated	
Golden Trailer Awards	June 6, 2017	Best Animation/Family TV Spot	"Epic Adventure Review"	Nominated	
Hollywood Film Awards	November 6, 2016	Hollywood Blockbuster Award	The Jungle Book	Won	
Hollywood Film Awards	November 6, 2016	Hollywood Sound Award	Christopher Boyes and Frank Eulner	Won	
Hollywood Music in Media Awards	November 17, 2016	Best Original Score – Sci-Fi/Fantasy Film	John Debney	Won	
Houston Film Critics Society	January 6, 2017	Technical Achievement	The Jungle Book (visual effects)	Nominated	
MPSE Golden Reel Awards	February 19, 2017	Feature English Language: Effects/Foley	Christopher Boyes, David Chrastka, Frank Eulner, Andre Fenley, Ken Fischer, James Likowski, Dee Selby, Dennie Thorpe and Jana Vance	Nominated	
NAACP Image Awards	February 11, 2017	Outstanding Character Voice-Over Performance	Idris Elba	Won	
People's Choice Awards	January 18, 2017	Favorite Family Movie	The Jungle Book	Nominated	
People's Choice Awards	January 18, 2017	Favorite Animated Movie Voice	Bill Murray	Nominated	
San Diego Film Critics Society	December 12, 2016	Best Visual Effects	The Jungle Book	Won	
Satellite Awards	February 19, 2017	Best Cinematography	Bill Pope	Won	
Satellite Awards	February 19, 2017	Best Visual Effects	The Jungle Book	Won	
Satellite Awards	February 19, 2017	Best Animated or Mixed Media Feature	The Jungle Book	Nominated	
Satellite Awards	February 19, 2017	Best Sound	The Jungle Book	Nominated	
Satellite Awards	February 19, 2017	Best Adapted Screenplay	Justin Marks	Nominated	
Satellite Awards	February 19, 2017	Best Original Score	John Debney	Nominated	
Satellite Awards	February 19, 2017	Best Art Direction and Production Design	Christophe Glass	Nominated	
Saturn Awards	June 28, 2017	Best Fantasy Film	The Jungle Book	Won	
Saturn Awards	June 28, 2017	Best Director	Jon Favreau	Nominated	
Saturn Awards	June 28, 2017	Best Supporting Actor	Christopher Walken	Nominated	
Saturn Awards	June 28, 2017	Best Performance by a Younger Actor	Neel Sethi	Nominated	
Saturn Awards	June 28, 2017	Best Editing	Mark Livolsi	Nominated	
Saturn Awards	June 28, 2017	Best Special Effects	Robert Legato, Dan Lemmon, Andrew R. Jones and Adam Valdez	Nominated	
St. Louis Gateway Film Critics Association	December 18, 2016	Best Visual Effects	The Jungle Book	Won	
Teen Choice Awards	July 31, 2016	Choice Movie: Action	The Jungle Book	Nominated	
Teen Choice Awards	July 31, 2016	Choice Movie Actor: Action	Neel Sethi	Nominated	
Teen Choice Awards	July 31, 2016	Choice Movie: Breakout Star	Neel Sethi	Nominated	
Visual Effects Society Awards	February 7, 2017	Outstanding Visual Effects in a Photoreal Feature	Joyce Cox, Andrew R. Jones, Robert Legato, JD Schwalm and Adam Valdez	Won	
Visual Effects Society Awards	February 7, 2017	Outstanding Animated Performance in a Photoreal Feature	King Louie – Andrei Coval, Paul Story, Jack Tema and Dennis Yoo	Won	
Visual Effects Society Awards	February 7, 2017	Outstanding Animated Performance in a Photoreal Feature	Shere Khan – Jake Harrell, Julio Del Rio Hernandez, James Hood and Benjamin Jones	Nominated	
Visual Effects Society Awards	February 7, 2017	Outstanding Virtual Cinematography in a Photoreal Project	John Brennan, Robert Legato, Bill Pope and Gary Roberts	Won	
Visual Effects Society Awards	February 7, 2017	Outstanding Effects Simulations in a Photoreal Feature	Fabian Nowak, Ludovic Ramisandaina, David Schneider and Oliver Winwood	Won	
Visual Effects Society Awards	February 7, 2017	Outstanding Compositing in a Photoreal Feature	Matthew Adams, Masaki Mitchell, Christoph Salzmann and Max Stummer	Won	
