= 24th Satellite Awards =

US awards ceremony for film and television

- Date: December 19, 2019
- Site: L'Ermitage Beverly Hills, Beverly Hills, California

Highlights
- Best drama film: Ford v Ferrari
- Best comedy/musical film: Once Upon a Time in Hollywood
- Best television drama: Succession
- Best television musical/comedy: Fleabag
- Best director: James Mangold for Ford v Ferrari

The 24th Satellite Awards is an award ceremony honoring the year's outstanding performers, films and television shows, presented by the International Press Academy.

The nominations were announced on December 3, 2019. The winners were announced on December 19, 2019.

== Special achievement awards ==
- Auteur Award (for singular vision and unique artistic control over the elements of production) – Edward Norton (Motherless Brooklyn)
- Humanitarian Award (for making a difference in the lives of those in the artistic community and beyond) – Mounia Meddour (Papicha)
- Mary Pickford Award (for outstanding contribution to the entertainment industry) – Stacy Keach
- Nikola Tesla Award (for visionary achievement in filmmaking technology) – Joe Letteri
- Best First Feature – Laure de Clermont-Tonnerre (The Mustang)
- Stunt Performance Award – Steve Stafford
- Ensemble: Motion Picture – Knives Out
- Ensemble: Television – Succession

== Motion picture winners and nominees ==
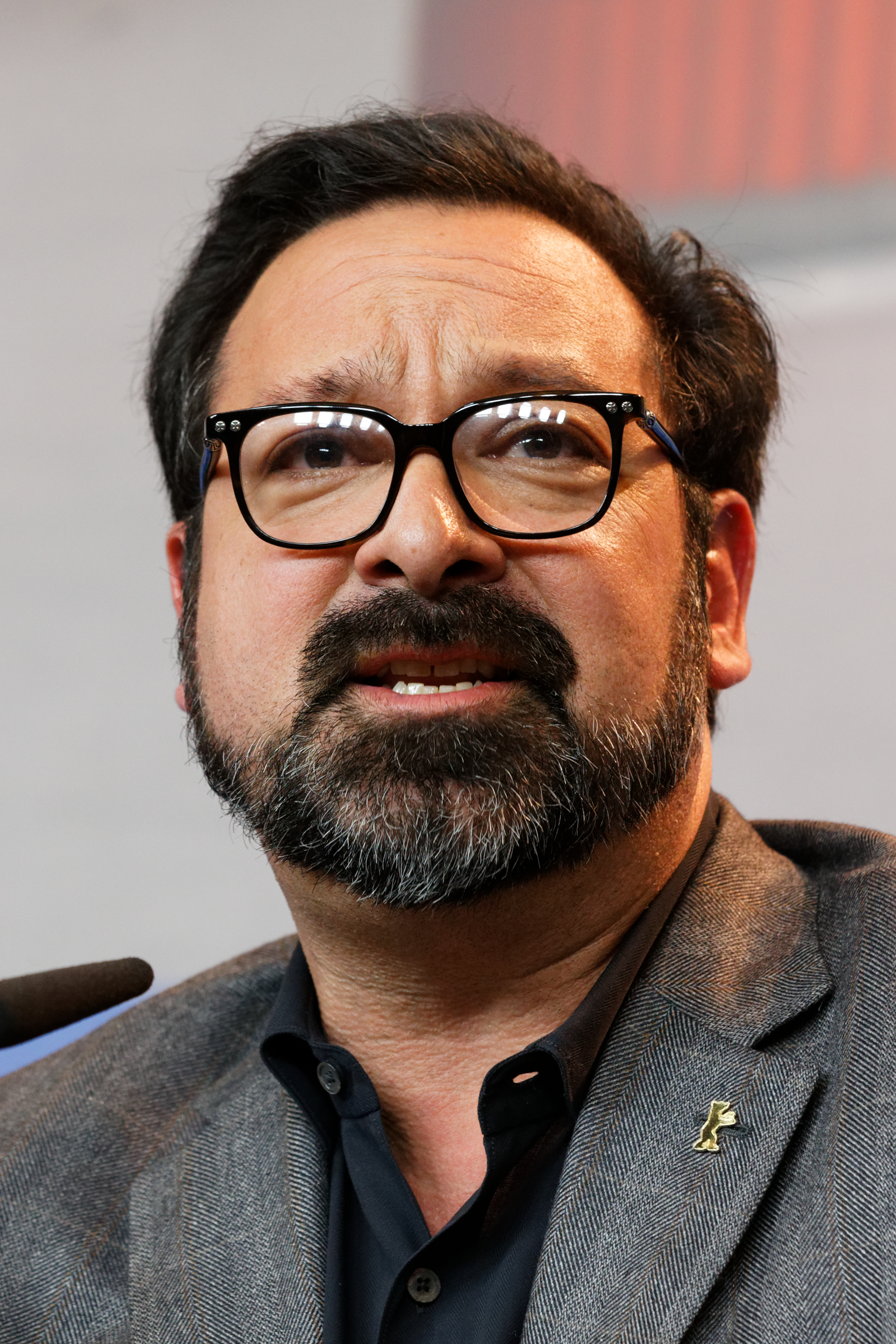
James Mangold, Best Director winner

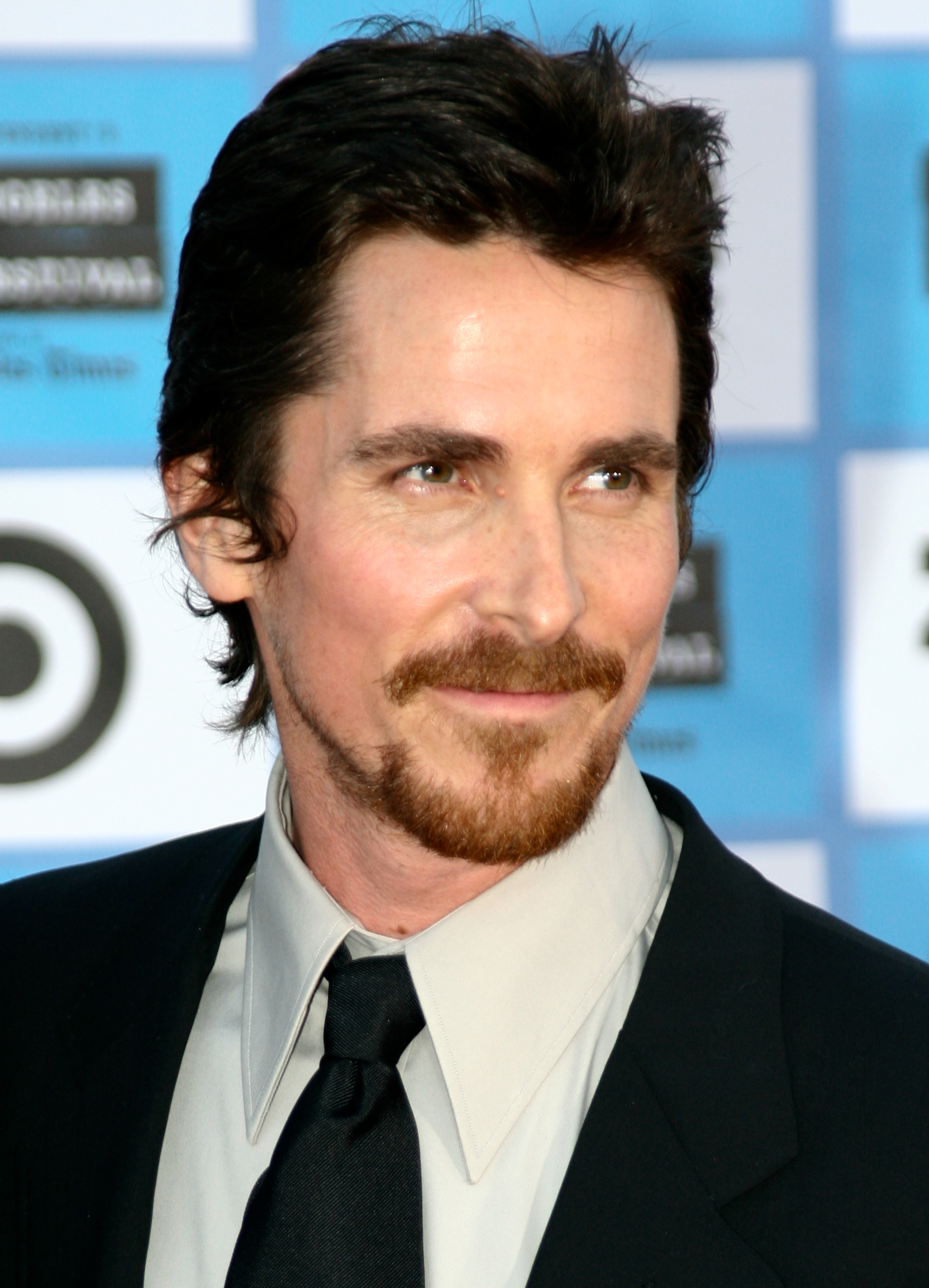
Christian Bale, Best Actor in a Motion Picture – Drama winner

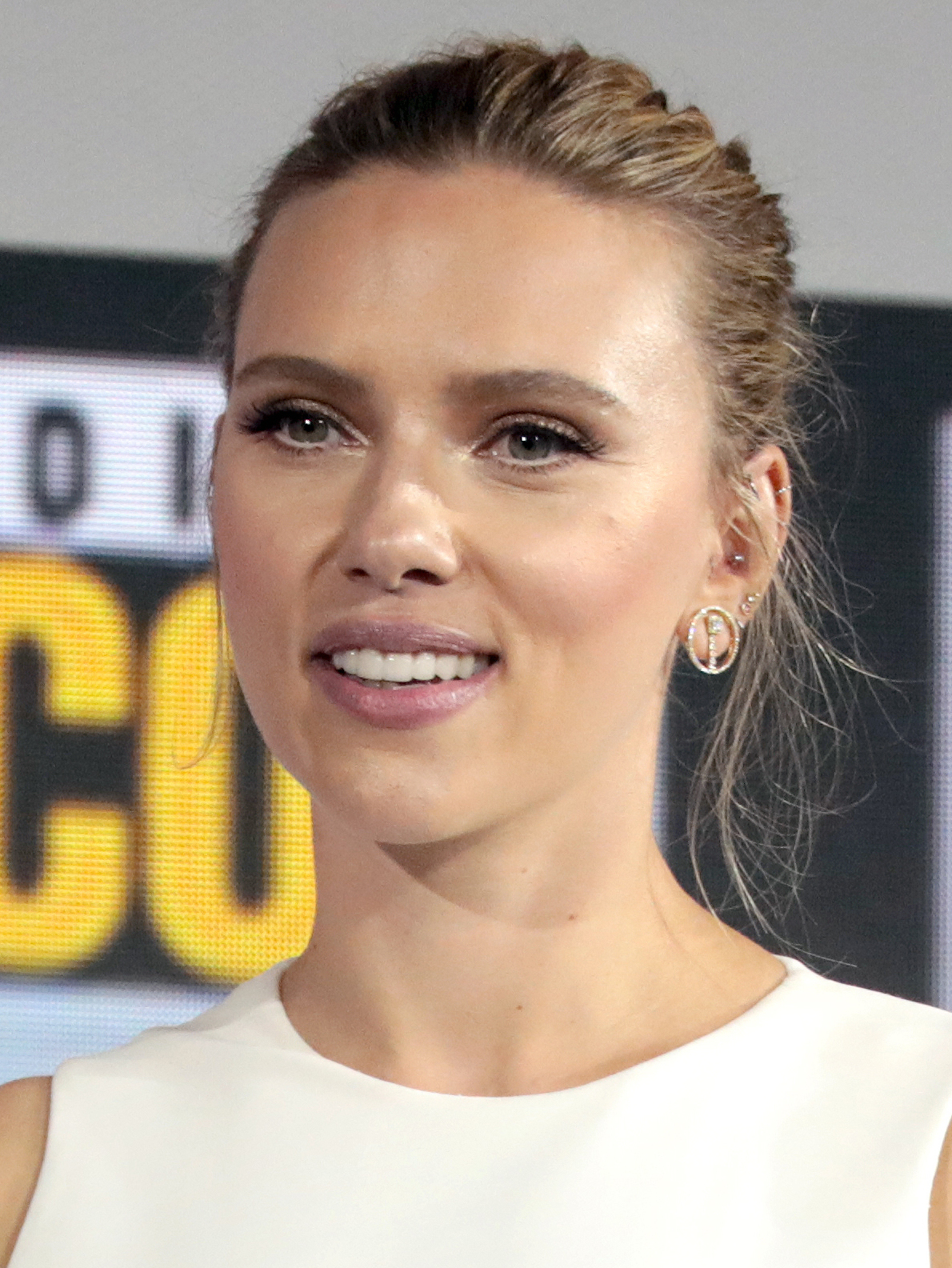
Scarlett Johansson, Best Actress in a Motion Picture – Drama winner

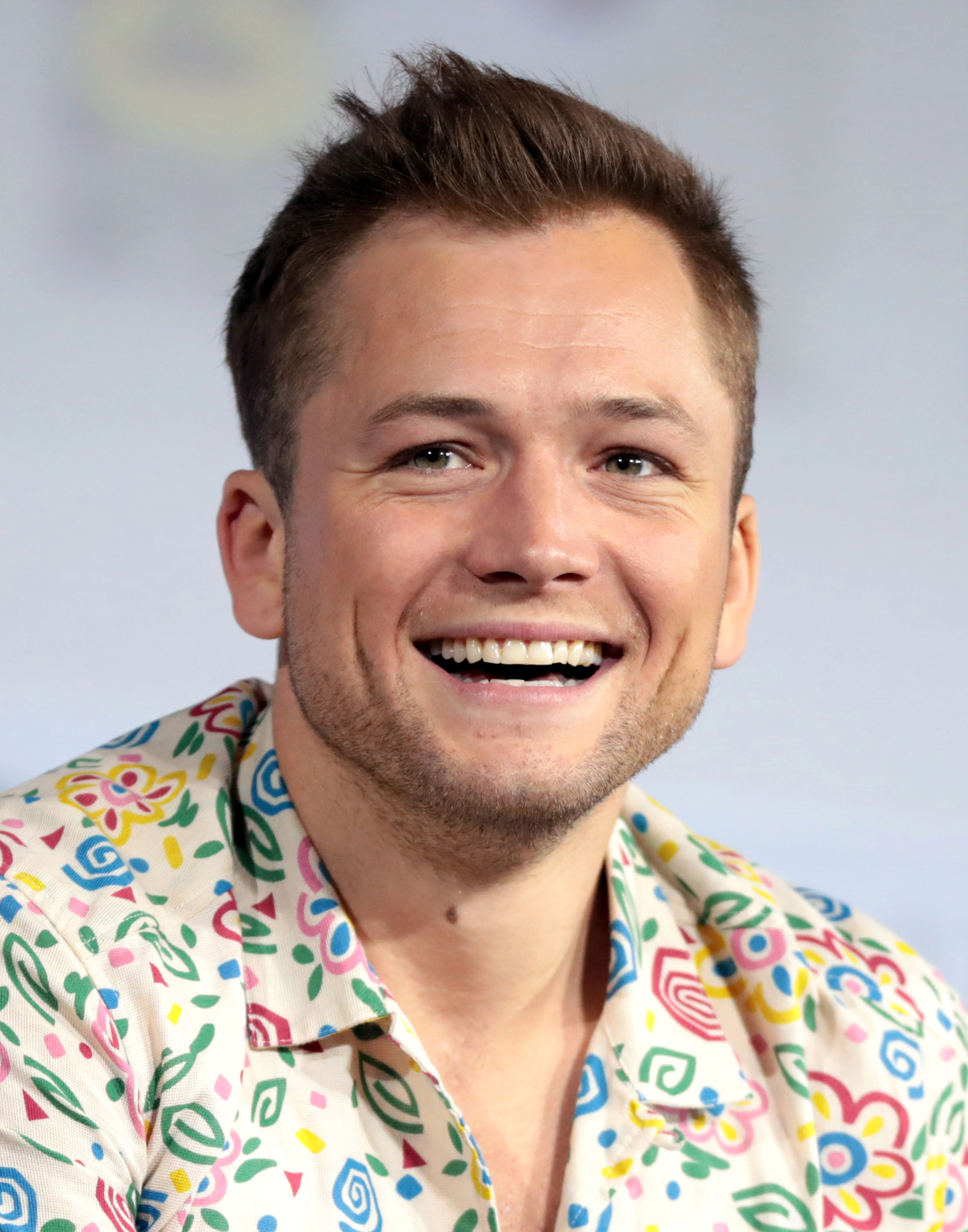
Taron Egerton, Best Actor in a Motion Picture – Comedy or Musical winner

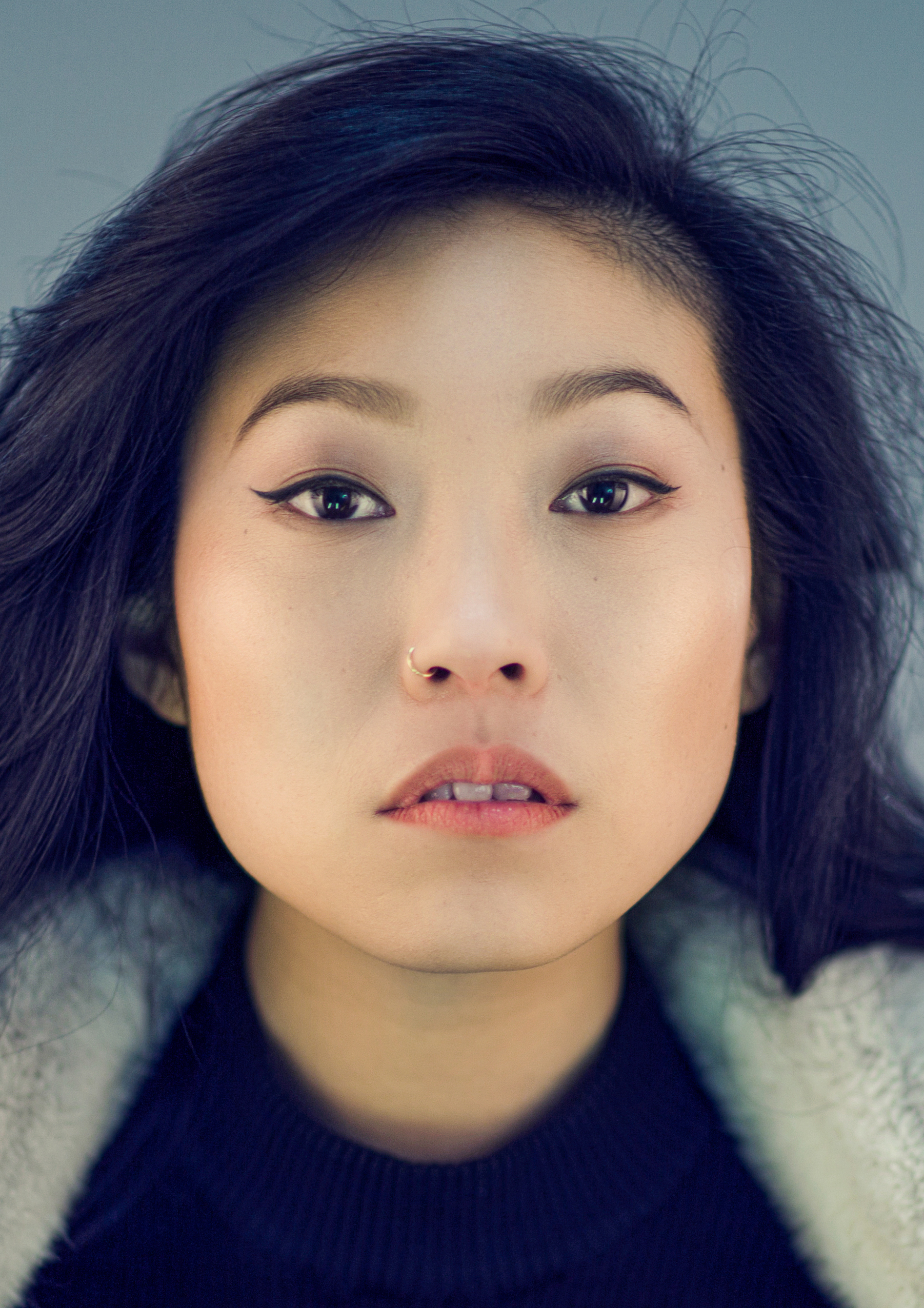
Awkwafina, Best Actress in a Motion Picture – Comedy or Musical winner

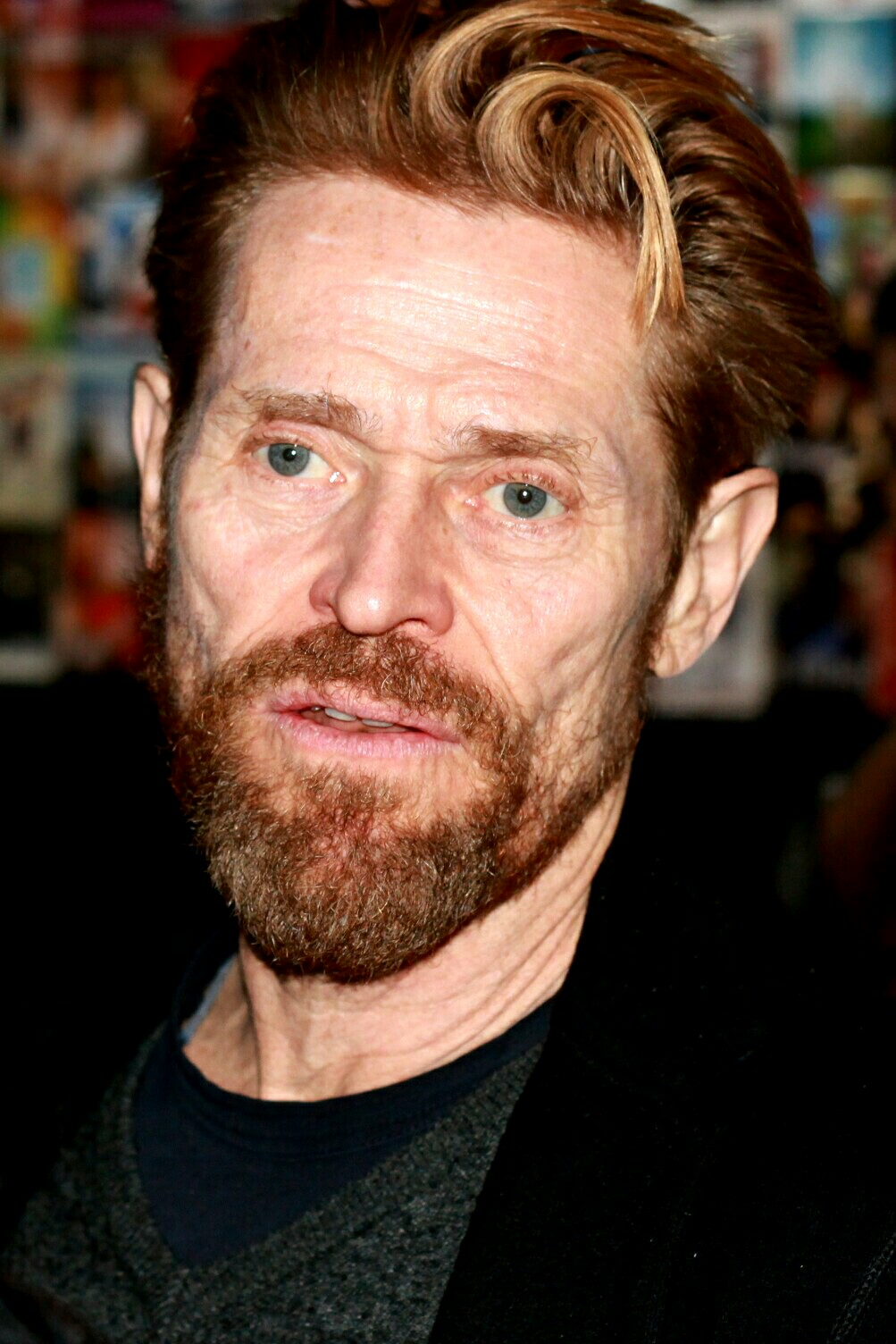
Willem Dafoe, Best Actor in a Supporting Role winner

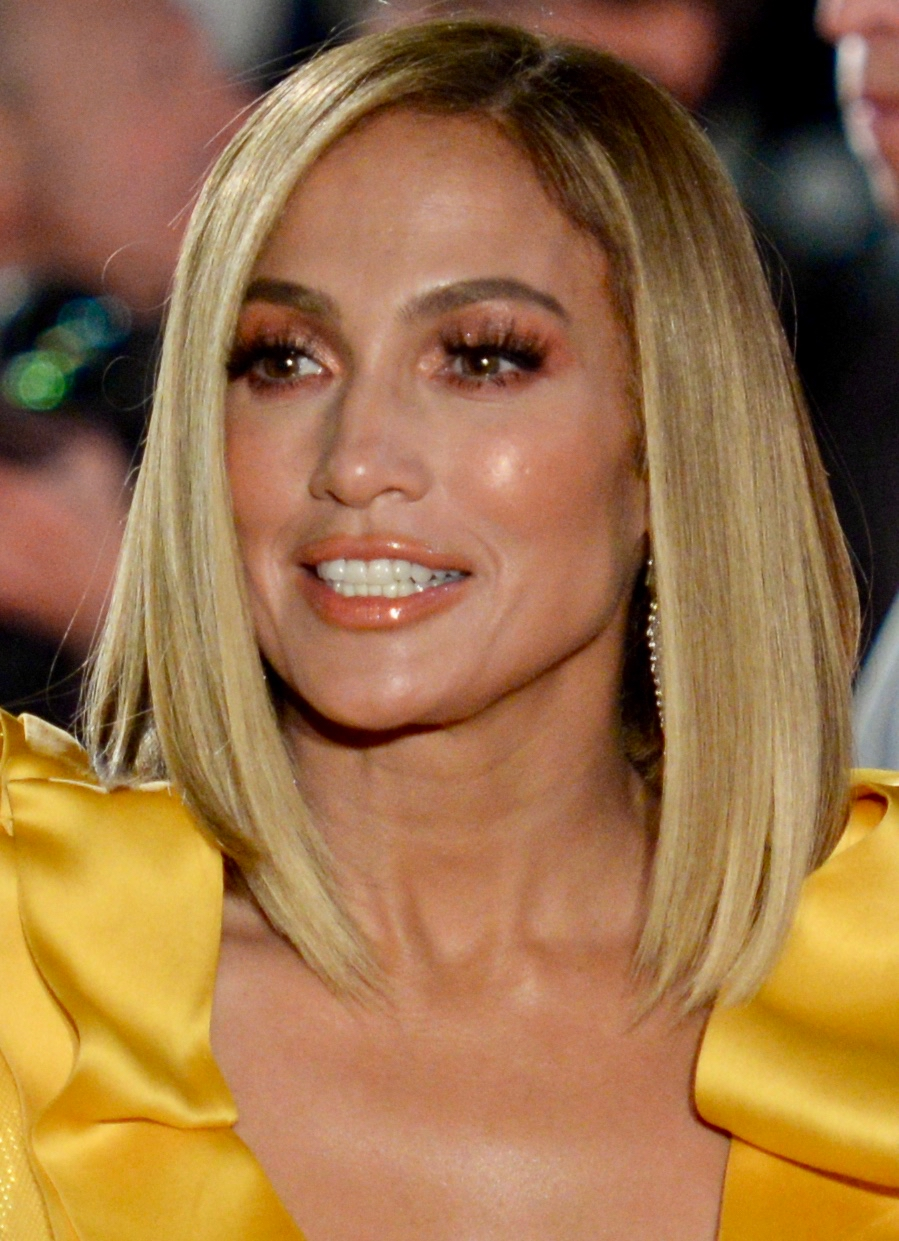
Jennifer Lopez, Best Actress in a Supporting Role winner

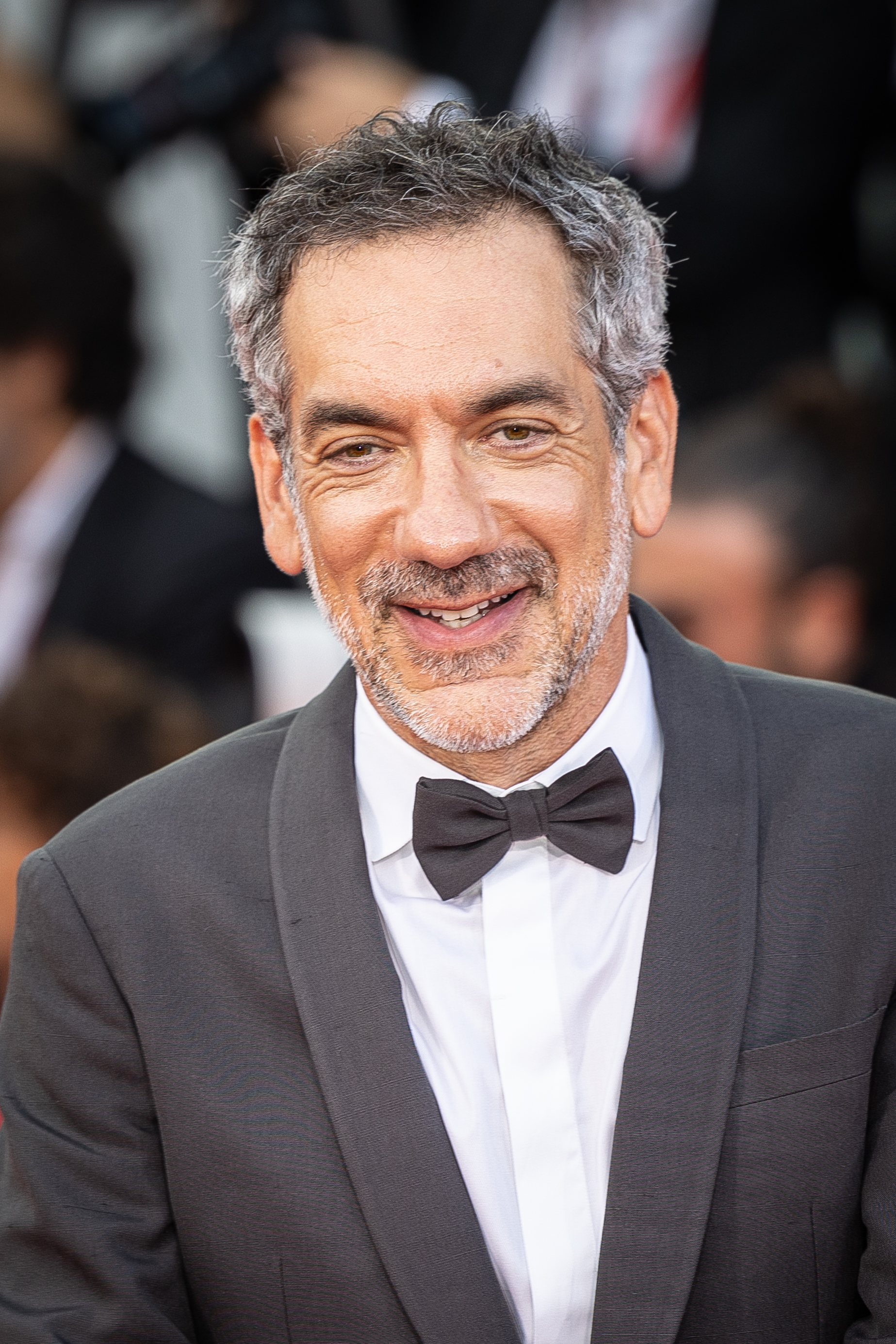
Todd Phillips, Best Adapted Screenplay co-winner

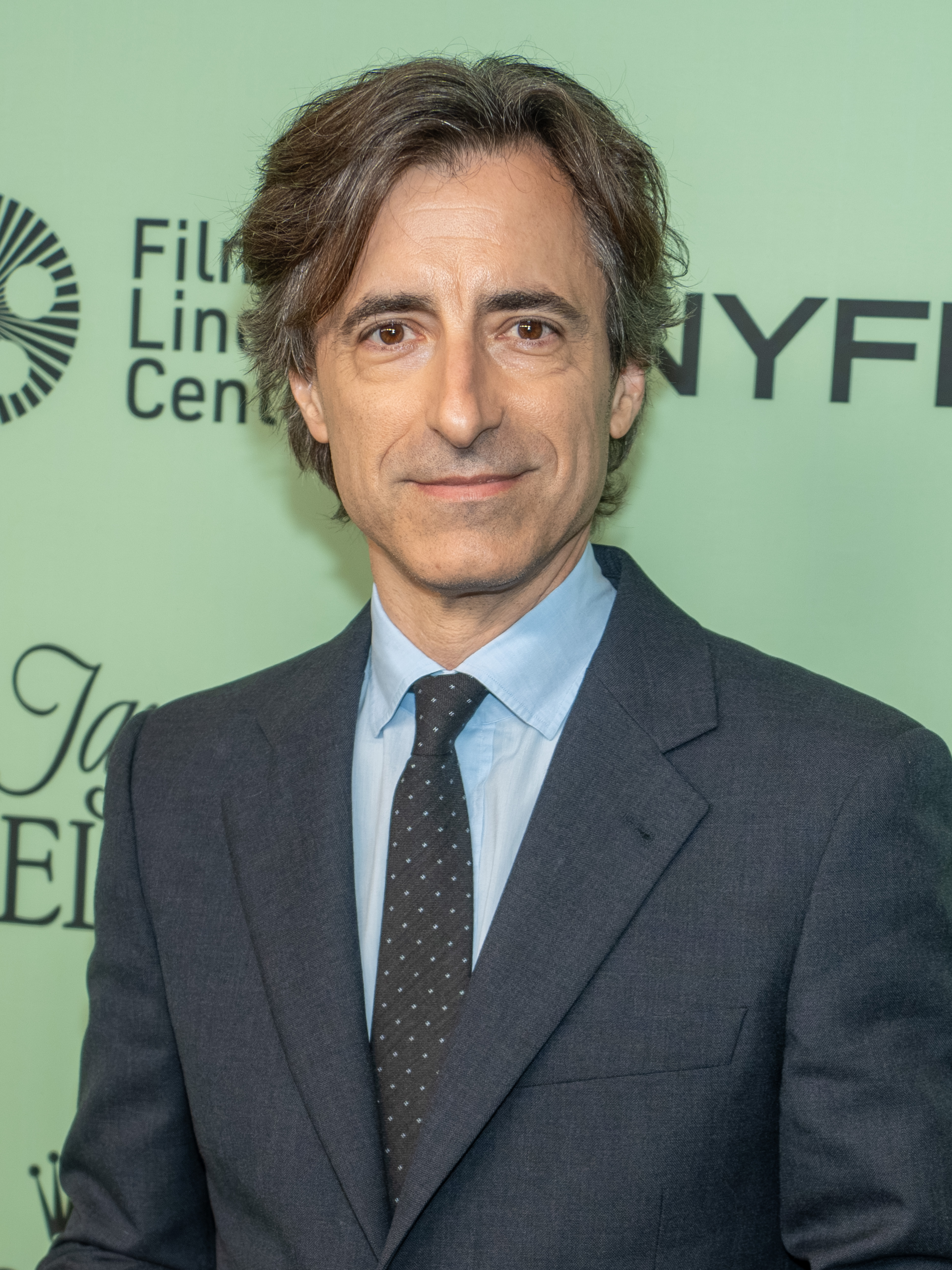
Noah Baumbach, Best Original Screenplay winner

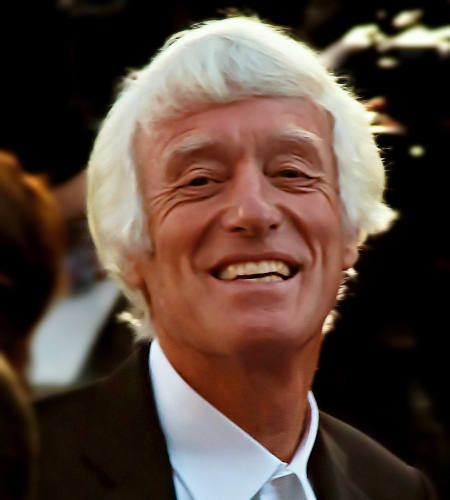
Roger Deakins, Best Cinematography winner

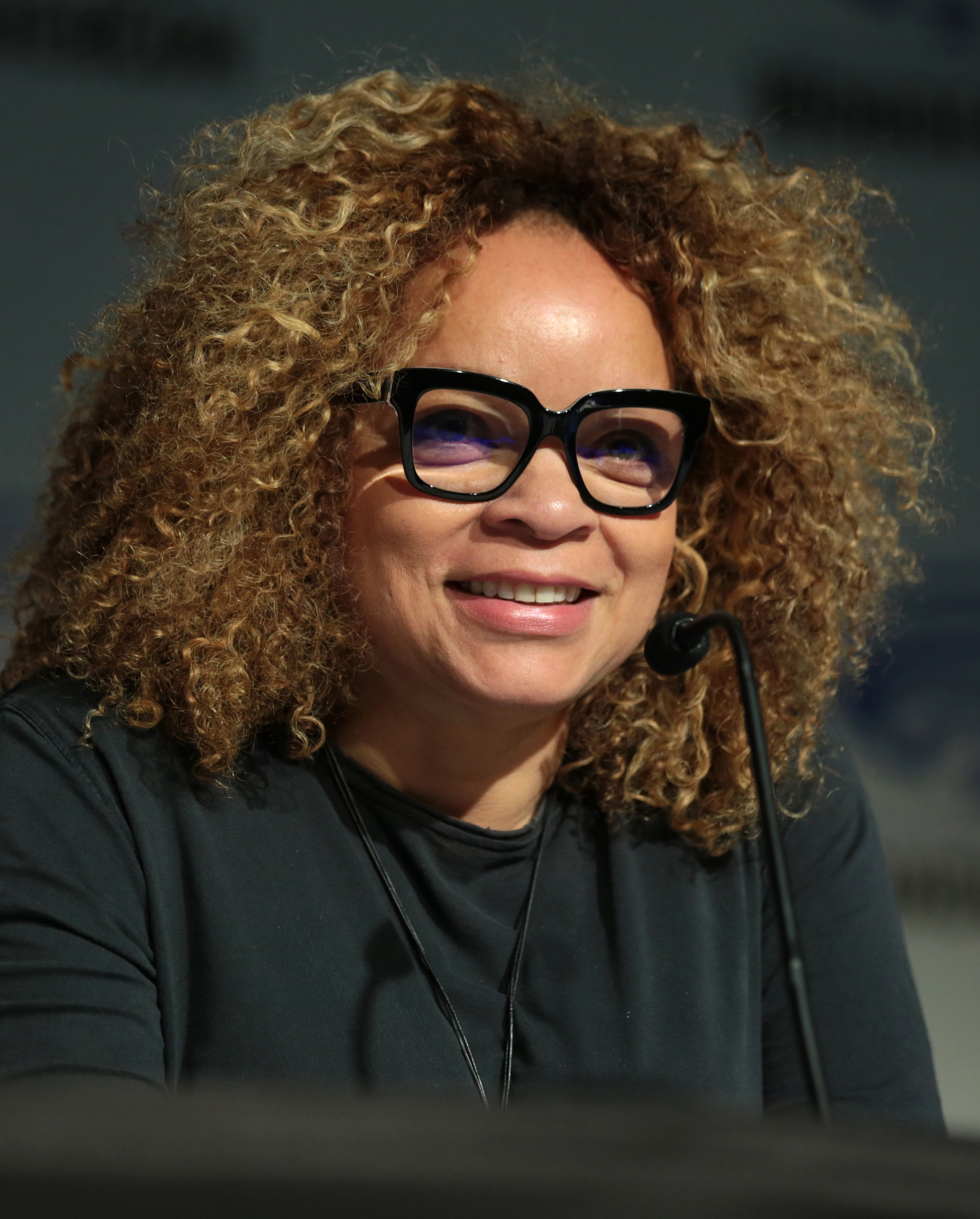
Ruth E. Carter, Best Costume Design winner

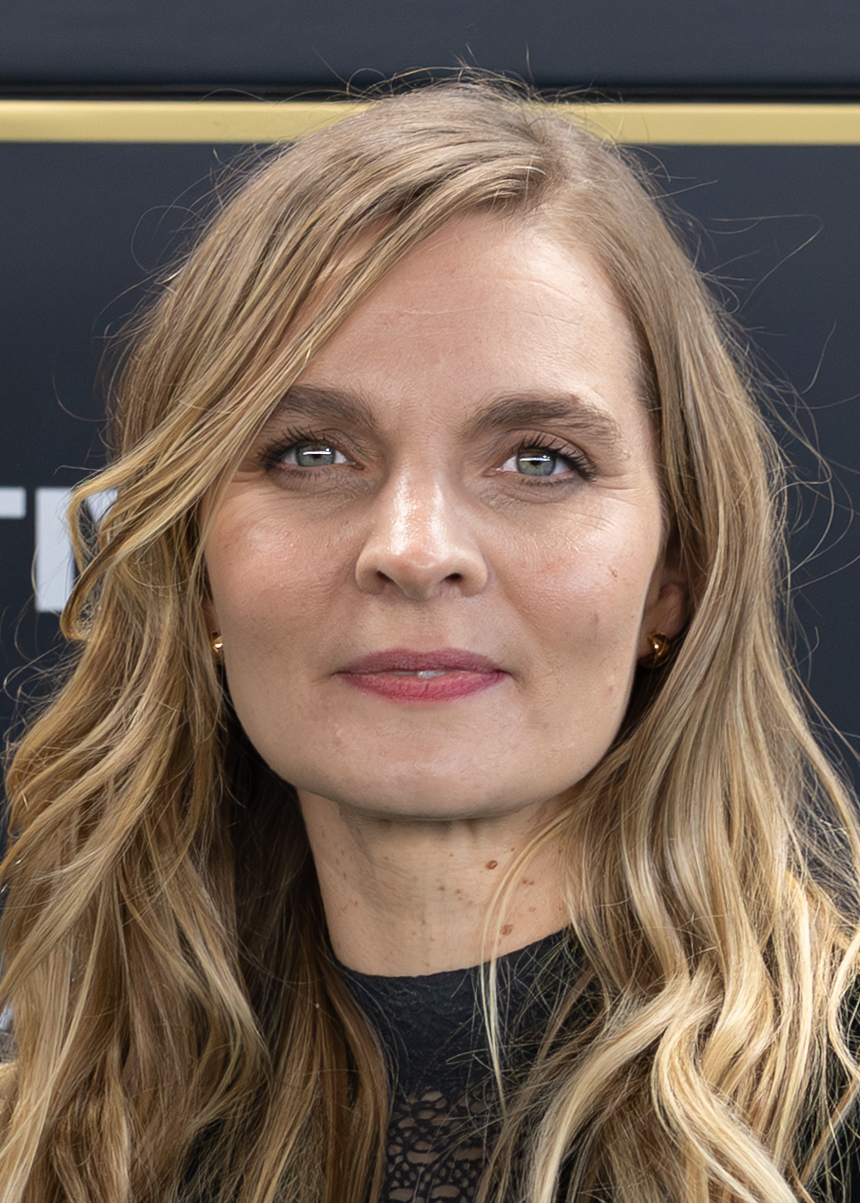
Hildur Guðnadóttir, Best Original Score winner

Winners are listed first and highlighted in bold.

Best Motion Picture – Drama	Best Motion Picture – Comedy or Musical
**Ford v Ferrari**; 1917; Bombshell; Burning Cane; Joker; The Lighthouse; Marriage Story; The Two Popes	**Once Upon a Time in Hollywood**; The Farewell; Hustlers; Knives Out; Rocketman; Uncut Gems
Best Motion Picture – Animated or Mixed Media	Best Director
**The Lion King**; Alita: Battle Angel; Buñuel in the Labyrinth of the Turtles; How to Train Your Dragon: The Hidden World; A Shaun the Sheep Movie: Farmageddon; Toy Story 4; Weathering with You	**James Mangold – Ford v Ferrari**; Pedro Almodóvar – Pain and Glory; Noah Baumbach – Marriage Story; Bong Joon Ho – Parasite; Sam Mendes – 1917; Quentin Tarantino – Once Upon a Time in Hollywood
Best Actor in a Motion Picture – Drama	Best Actress in a Motion Picture – Drama
**Christian Bale – Ford v Ferrari as Ken Miles**; Antonio Banderas – Pain and Glory as Salvador Mallo; Adam Driver – Marriage Story as Charlie Barber; George MacKay – 1917 as Lance Corporal Schofield; Joaquin Phoenix – Joker as Arthur Fleck / Joker; Mark Ruffalo – Dark Waters as Robert Bilott	**Scarlett Johansson – Marriage Story as Nicole Barber**; Cynthia Erivo – Harriet as Harriet Tubman; Helen Mirren – The Good Liar as Betty McLeish; Charlize Theron – Bombshell as Megyn Kelly; Alfre Woodard – Clemency as Warden Bernadine Williams; Renée Zellweger – Judy as Judy Garland
Best Actor in a Motion Picture – Comedy or Musical	Best Actress in a Motion Picture – Comedy or Musical
**Taron Egerton – Rocketman as Elton John**; Daniel Craig – Knives Out as Benoit Blanc; Leonardo DiCaprio – Once Upon a Time in Hollywood as Rick Dalton; Eddie Murphy – Dolemite Is My Name as Rudy Ray Moore; Adam Sandler – Uncut Gems as Howard Ratner; Taika Waititi – Jojo Rabbit as Adolf Hitler	**Awkwafina – The Farewell as Billi Wang**; Ana de Armas – Knives Out as Marta Cabrera; Julianne Moore – Gloria Bell as Gloria Bell; Constance Wu – Hustlers as Destiny
Best Actor in a Supporting Role	Best Actress in a Supporting Role
**Willem Dafoe – The Lighthouse as Thomas Wake**; Tom Hanks – A Beautiful Day in the Neighborhood as Fred Rogers; Anthony Hopkins – The Two Popes as Pope Benedict XVI; Joe Pesci – The Irishman as Russell Bufalino; Wendell Pierce – Burning Cane as Reverend Tillman; Brad Pitt – Once Upon a Time in Hollywood as Cliff Booth	**Jennifer Lopez – Hustlers as Ramona Vega**; Penélope Cruz – Pain and Glory as Jacinta; Laura Dern – Marriage Story as Nora Fanshaw; Nicole Kidman – Bombshell as Gretchen Carlson; Margot Robbie – Bombshell as Kayla Pospisil; Zhao Shu-zhen – The Farewell as Nai Nai
Best Original Screenplay	Best Adapted Screenplay
**Marriage Story – Noah Baumbach**; The Farewell – Lulu Wang; Ford v Ferrari – Jez Butterworth, John-Henry Butterworth, and Jason Keller; Once Upon a Time in Hollywood – Quentin Tarantino; Pain and Glory – Pedro Almodóvar; Parasite – Bong Joon Ho and Han Jin-won	**Joker – Todd Phillips and Scott Silver**; Dark Waters – Matthew Michael Carnahan, Mario Correa, and Nathaniel Rich; The Irishman – Steven Zaillian; Jojo Rabbit – Taika Waititi; Motherless Brooklyn – Edward Norton; The Two Popes – Anthony McCarten
Best Motion Picture – Documentary	Best Motion Picture – International
**63 Up**; The Apollo; Apollo 11; The Cave; Citizen K; For Sama; Honeyland; One Child Nation	**Truth and Justice (Estonia)**; Atlantics (Senegal); Beanpole (Russia); Les Misérables (France); Pain and Glory (Spain); The Painted Bird (Czech Republic); Parasite (South Korea); Portrait of a Lady on Fire (France)
Best Cinematography	Best Film Editing
**1917 – Roger Deakins**; Ford v Ferrari – Phedon Papamichael; The Irishman – Rodrigo Prieto; Joker – Lawrence Sher; Motherless Brooklyn – Dick Pope; Rocketman – George Richmond	**Ford v Ferrari – Andrew Buckland and Michael McCusker**; 1917 – Lee Smith; The Irishman – Thelma Schoonmaker; Joker – Jeff Groth; Marriage Story – Jennifer Lame; Rocketman – Chris Dickens
Best Art Direction and Production Design	Best Costume Design
**Motherless Brooklyn – Michael Ahern and Beth Mickle**; 1917 – Dennis Gassner and Lee Sandales; Ford v Ferrari – François Audouy and Peter Lando; Joker – Laura Ballinger and Mark Friedberg; Once Upon a Time in Hollywood – Nancy Haigh and Barbara Ling; The Two Popes – Saverio Sammali and Mark Tildesley	**Dolemite Is My Name – Ruth E. Carter**; Downton Abbey – Anna Mary Scott Robbins; Joker – Mark Bridges; Judy – Jany Temime; Rocketman – Julian Day; The Two Popes – Luca Canfora
Best Original Score	Best Original Song
**Joker – Hildur Guðnadóttir**; 1917 – Thomas Newman; Ford v Ferrari – Marco Beltrami and Buck Sanders; Harriet – Terence Blanchard; The Irishman – Robbie Robertson; Marriage Story – Randy Newman	**"(I'm Gonna) Love Me Again" – Rocketman**; "The Ballad of the Lonesome Cowboy" – Toy Story 4; "Don't Call Me Angel" – Charlie's Angels; "Into the Unknown" – Frozen 2; "Spirit" – The Lion King; "Swan Song" – Alita: Battle Angel
Best Sound (Editing and Mixing)	Best Visual Effects
**Ford v Ferrari – David Giammarco, Paul Massey, Steven A. Morrow, and Donald Sylvester**; 1917 – Scott Millan, Oliver Tarney, Mark Taylor, and Stuart Wilson; Avengers: Endgame – Tom Johnson, Daniel Laurie, Shannon Mills, Juan Peralta, and John Pritchett; Joker – Tod Maitland, Alan Robert Murray, Tom Ozanich, and Dean Zupancic; Once Upon a Time in Hollywood – Christian P. Minkler, Michael Minkler, Wylie Stateman, and Mark Ulano; Rocketman – Matthew Collinge, John Hayes, Danny Sheehan, and Mike Prestwood Smith	**Alita: Battle Angel – Joe Letteri and Eric Saindon**; Avengers: Endgame – Matt Aitken, Dan DeLeeuw, Russell Earl, and Dan Sudick; Ford v Ferrari – Mark Byers, Olivier Dumont, and Kathy Siegel; The Irishman – Pablo Helman; Joker – Mathew Giampa, Bryan Godwin, and Edwin Rivera; The Lion King – Andrew R. Jones, Robert Legato, Elliot Newman, and Adam Valdez

=== Films with multiple nominations ===
Nominations	Films
10	Ford v Ferrari
10	Joker
8	1917
8	Marriage Story
7	Once Upon a Time in Hollywood
7	Rocketman
6	The Irishman
5	Pain and Glory
5	The Two Popes
4	Bombshell
4	The Farewell
3	Alita: Battle Angel
3	Hustlers
3	Knives Out
3	The Lion King
3	Motherless Brooklyn
3	Parasite
2	Avengers: Endgame
2	Burning Cane
2	Dark Waters
2	Dolemite Is My Name
2	Harriet
2	Jojo Rabbit
2	Judy
2	The Lighthouse
2	Toy Story 4
2	Uncut Gems

=== Films with multiple wins ===
Wins	Films
5	Ford v Ferrari
2	Joker
2	Marriage Story
2	Rocketman

== Television winners and nominees ==
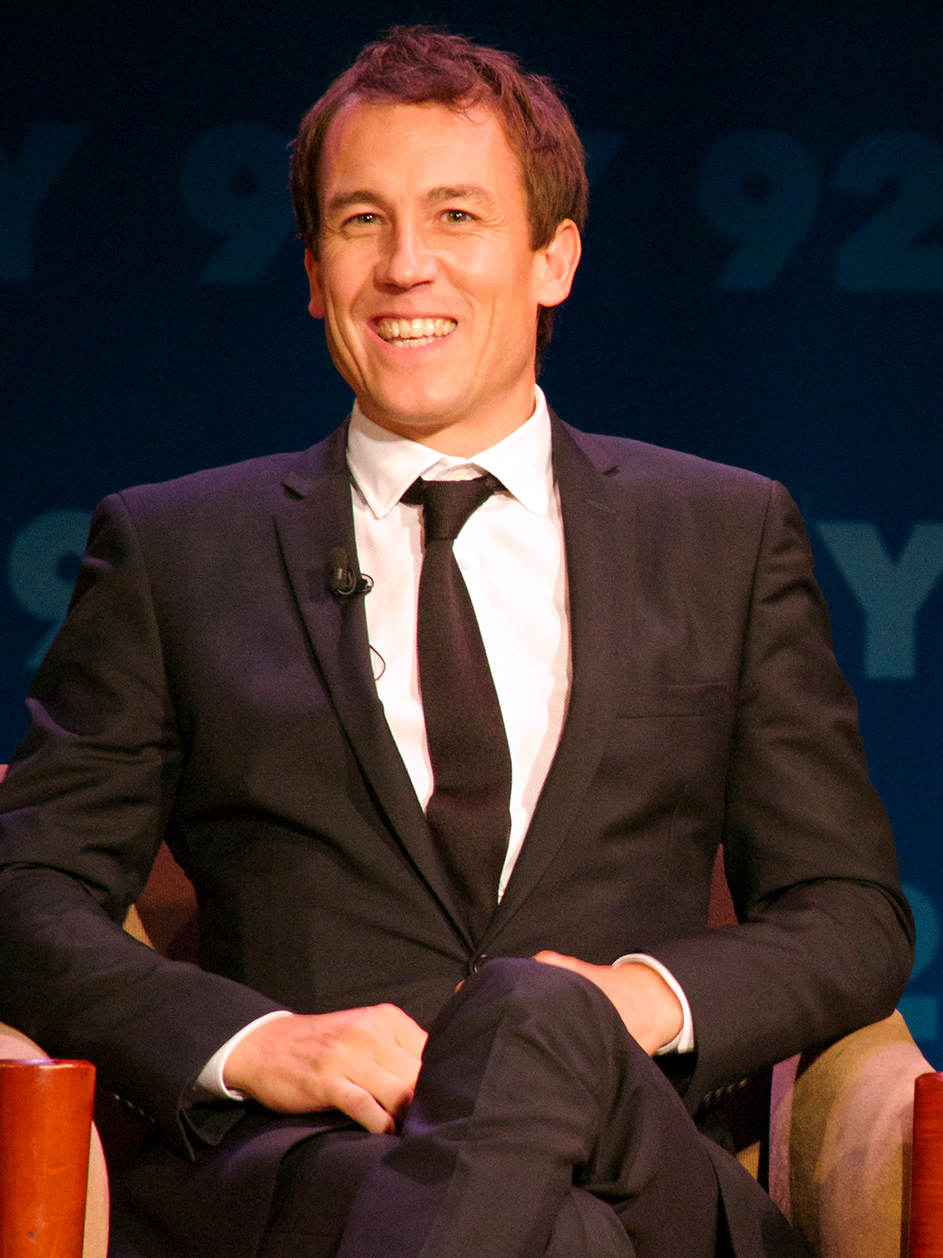
Tobias Menzies, Best Actor in a Drama / Genre Series winner

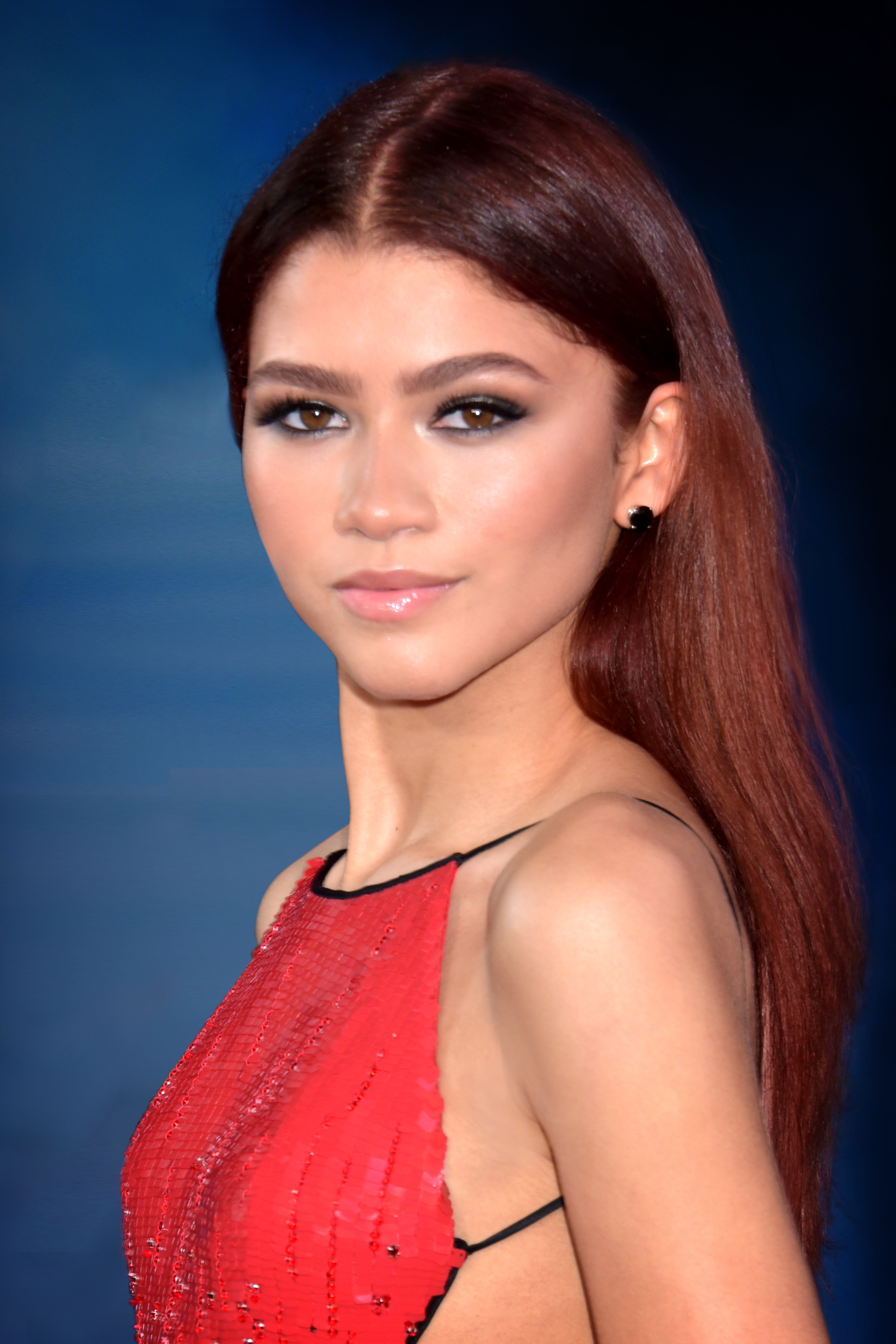
Zendaya, Best Actress in a Drama / Genre Series winner

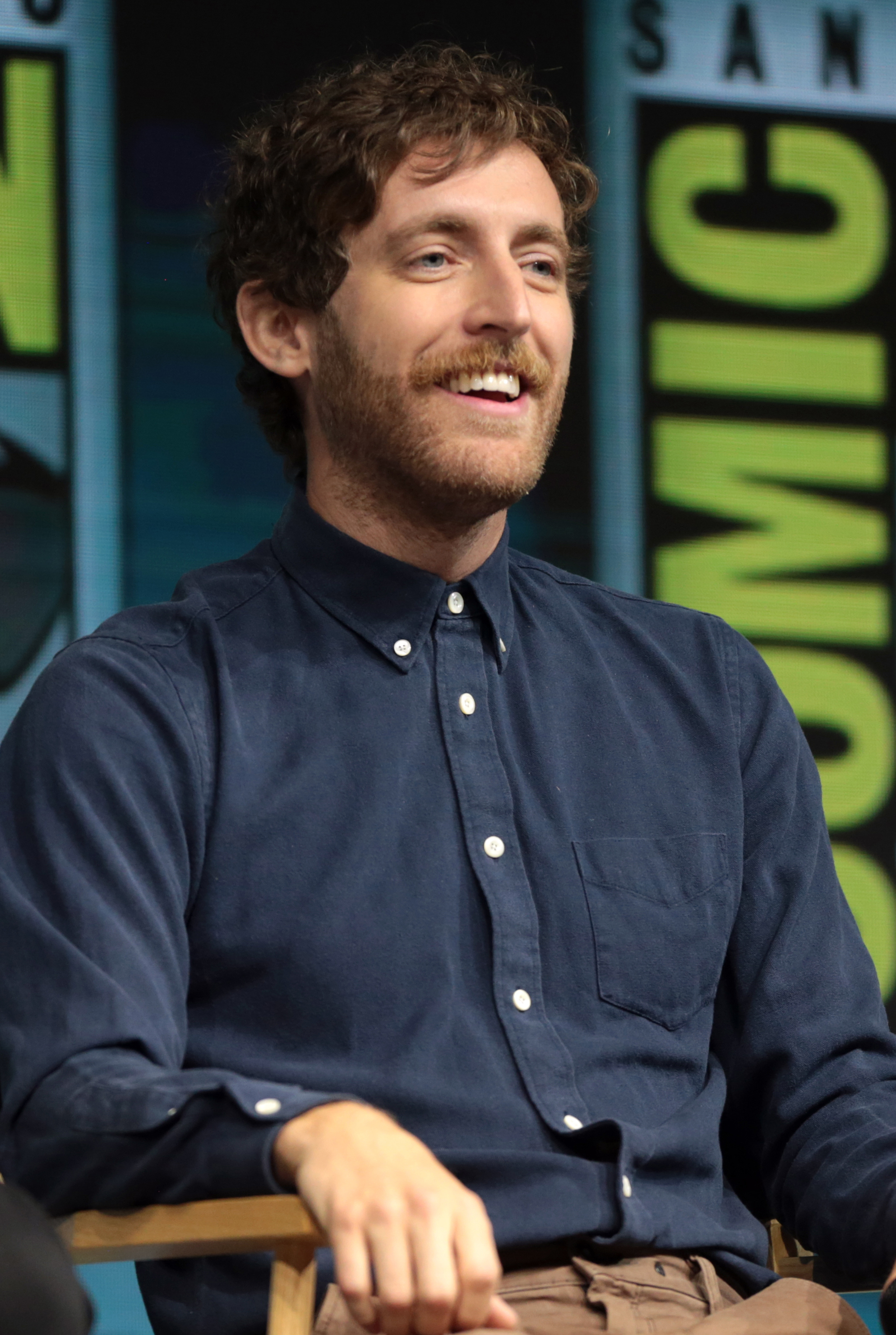
Thomas Middleditch, Best Actor in a Comedy or Musical Series winner

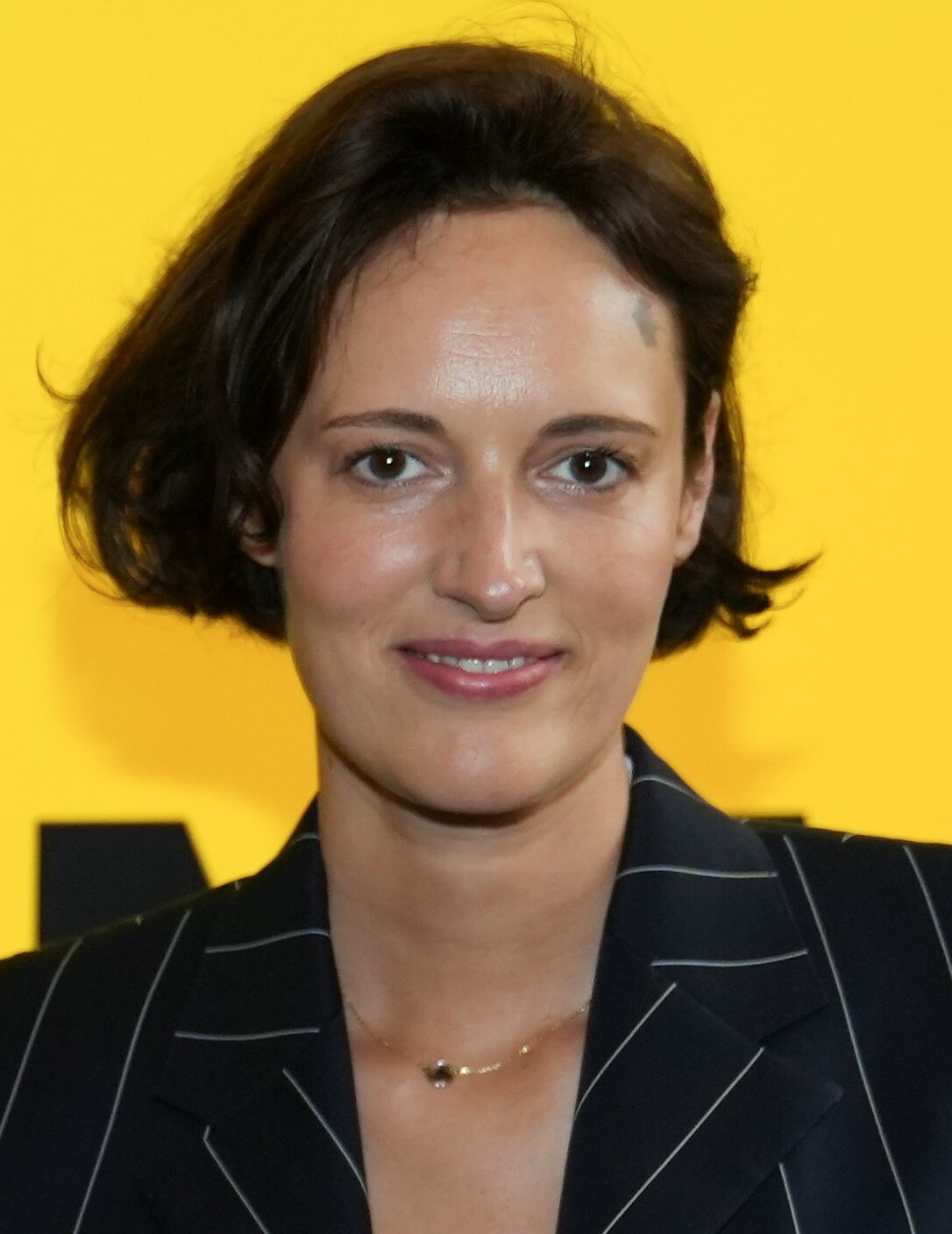
Phoebe Waller-Bridge, Best Actress in a Comedy or Musical Series winner

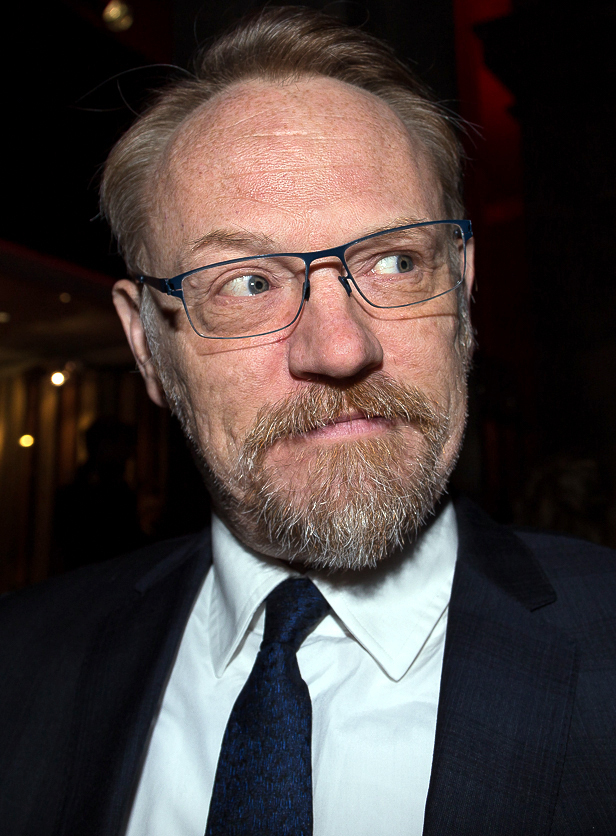
Jared Harris, Best Actor in a Miniseries & Limited Series or Motion Picture Made for Television winner

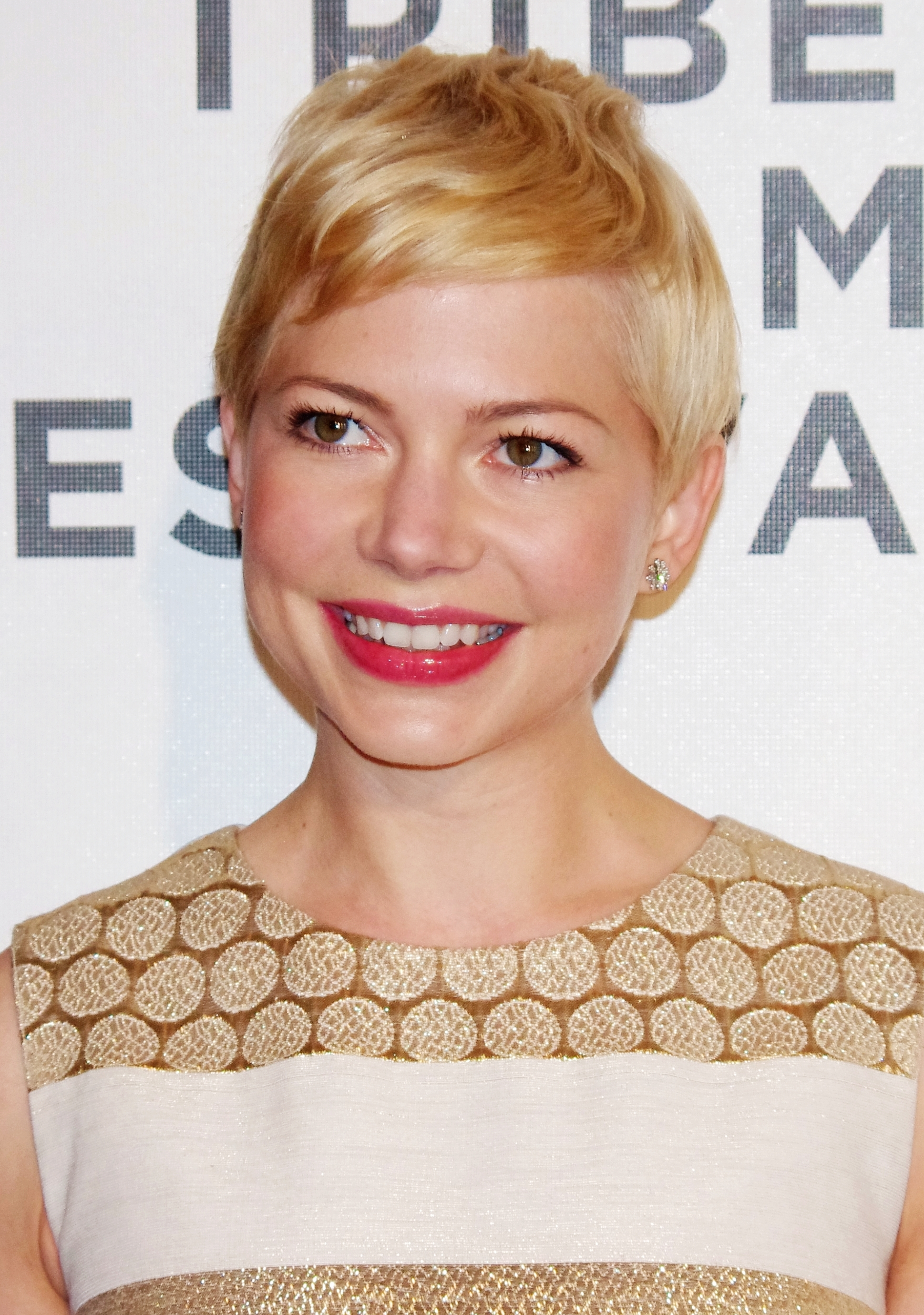
Michelle Williams, Best Actress in a Miniseries & Limited Series or Motion Picture Made for Television winner

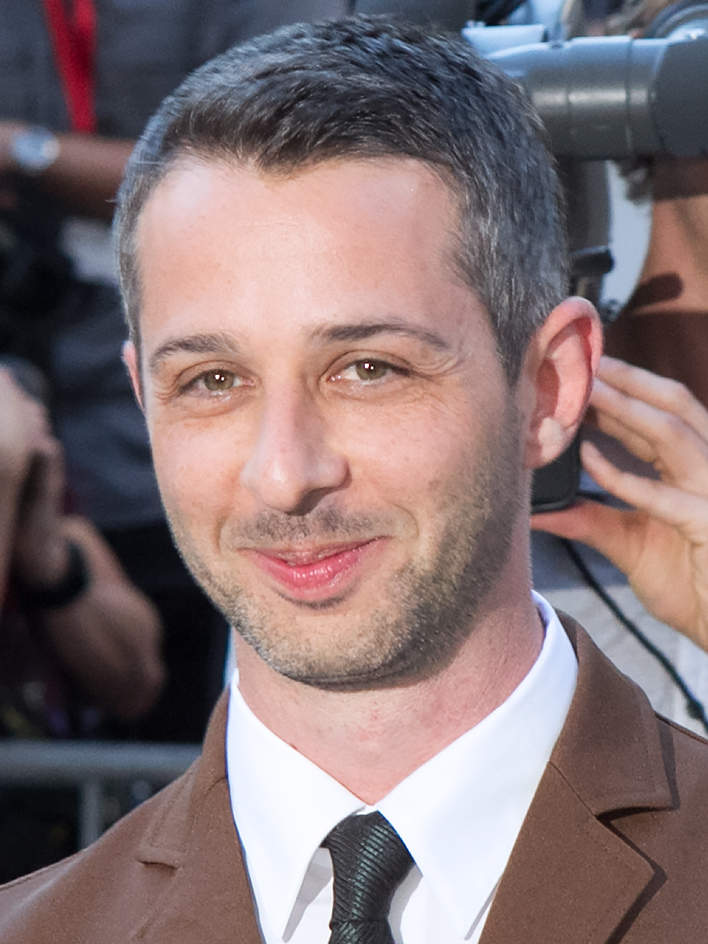
Jeremy Strong, Best Actor in a Supporting Role in a Series, Miniseries & Limited Series, or Motion Picture Made for Television winner

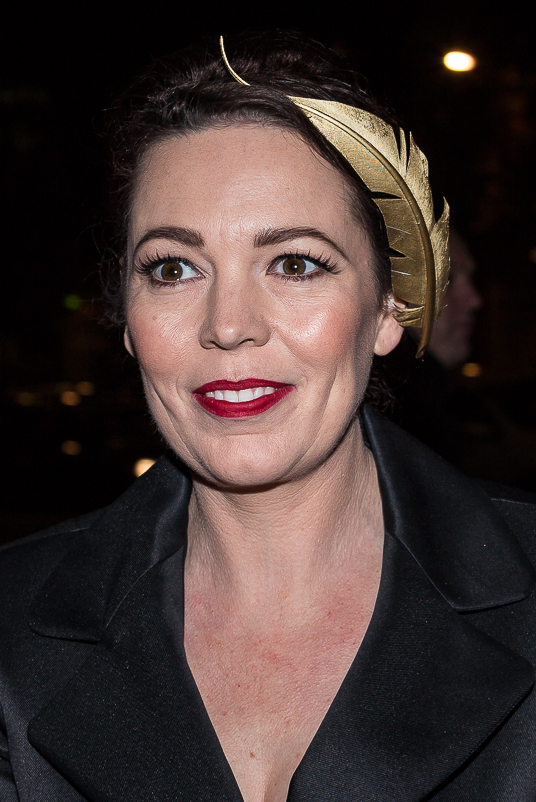
Olivia Colman, Best Actress in a Supporting Role in a Series, Miniseries & Limited Series, or Motion Picture Made for Television winner

Winners are listed first and highlighted in bold.

Best Drama Series	Best Comedy or Musical Series
**Succession (HBO)**; The Affair (Showtime); The Crown (Netflix); Killing Eve (BBC America); Mindhunter (Netflix); Mr. Mercedes (Audience)	**Fleabag (Amazon)**; Barry (HBO); The Good Place (NBC); The Kominsky Method (Netflix); The Marvelous Mrs. Maisel (Amazon); The Righteous Gemstones (HBO); Russian Doll (Netflix)
Best Genre Series	Best Miniseries & Limited Series
**Stranger Things (Netflix)**; Carnival Row (Amazon); Game of Thrones (HBO); His Dark Materials (HBO); The Terror: Infamy (AMC); Watchmen (HBO)	**Chernobyl (HBO)**; The Act (Hulu); Fosse/Verdon (FX); Unbelievable (Netflix); When They See Us (Netflix); Years and Years (HBO)
Best Motion Picture Made for Television
**El Camino: A Breaking Bad Movie (Netflix)**; Brexit: The Uncivil War (HBO); Deadwood: The Movie (HBO); The Highwaymen (Netflix)
Best Actor in a Drama / Genre Series	Best Actress in a Drama / Genre Series
**Tobias Menzies – The Crown as Prince Philip, Duke of Edinburgh**; Brian Cox – Succession as Logan Roy; Brendan Gleeson – Mr. Mercedes as Bill Hodges; Jonathan Groff – Mindhunter as Holden Ford; Damian Lewis – Billions as Robert "Bobby" Axelrod; Billy Bob Thornton – Goliath as Billy McBride	**Zendaya – Euphoria as Rue Bennett**; Olivia Colman – The Crown as Queen Elizabeth II; Jodie Comer – Killing Eve as Villanelle / Oksana Astankova; Regina King – Watchmen as Angela Abar / Sister Night; Sandra Oh – Killing Eve as Eve Polastri; Maggie Siff – Billions as Wendy Rhoades
Best Actor in a Comedy or Musical Series	Best Actress in a Comedy or Musical Series
**Thomas Middleditch – Silicon Valley as Richard Hendricks**; Ted Danson – The Good Place as Michael; Michael Douglas – The Kominsky Method as Sandy Kominsky; Bill Hader – Barry as Barry Berkman / Barry Block; Eugene Levy – Schitt's Creek as Johnny Rose; Danny McBride – The Righteous Gemstones as Jesse Gemstone	**Phoebe Waller-Bridge – Fleabag as Fleabag**; Pamela Adlon – Better Things as Sam Fox; Christina Applegate – Dead to Me as Jen Harding; Alison Brie – GLOW as Ruth "Zoya the Destroya" Wilder; Rachel Brosnahan – The Marvelous Mrs. Maisel as Miriam "Midge" Maisel; Natasha Lyonne – Russian Doll as Nadia Vulvokov; Catherine O'Hara – Schitt's Creek as Moira Rose
Best Actor in a Miniseries & Limited Series or Motion Picture Made for Television	Best Actress in a Miniseries & Limited Series or Motion Picture Made for Television
**Jared Harris – Chernobyl as Valery Legasov**; Russell Crowe – The Loudest Voice as Roger Ailes; Jharrel Jerome – When They See Us as Korey Wise; Aaron Paul – El Camino: A Breaking Bad Movie as Jesse Pinkman; Chris Pine – I Am the Night as Jay Singletary; Sam Rockwell – Fosse/Verdon as Bob Fosse	**Michelle Williams – Fosse/Verdon as Gwen Verdon**; India Eisley – I Am the Night as Fauna Hodel; Aunjanue Ellis – When They See Us as Sharonne Salaam; Joey King – The Act as Gypsy Blanchard; Helen Mirren – Catherine the Great as Catherine the Great; Niecy Nash – When They See Us as Delores Wise
Best Actor in a Supporting Role in a Series, Miniseries & Limited Series, or Motion Picture Made for Television	Best Actress in a Supporting Role in a Series, Miniseries & Limited Series, or Motion Picture Made for Television
**Jeremy Strong – Succession as Kendall Roy**; Alan Arkin – The Kominsky Method as Norman Newlander; Walton Goggins – The Righteous Gemstones as Baby Billy Freeman; Dennis Quaid – Goliath as Wade Blackwood; Andrew Scott – Fleabag as The Priest; Tony Shalhoub – The Marvelous Mrs. Maisel as Abraham "Abe" Weissman; Stellan Skarsgård – Chernobyl as Boris Shcherbina	**Olivia Colman – Fleabag as Godmother**; Patricia Arquette – The Act as Dee Dee Blanchard; Alex Borstein – The Marvelous Mrs. Maisel as Susie Myerson; Toni Collette – Unbelievable as Det. Grace Rasmussen; Meryl Streep – Big Little Lies as Mary Louise Wright; Emily Watson – Chernobyl as Ulana Khomyuk; Naomi Watts – The Loudest Voice as Gretchen Carlson

=== Series with multiple nominations ===
Nominations	Series
4	Chernobyl
4	Fleabag
4	The Marvelous Mrs. Maisel
4	When They See Us
3	The Act
3	The Crown
3	Fosse/Verdon
3	Killing Eve
3	The Kominsky Method
3	The Righteous Gemstones
3	Succession
2	Barry
2	Billions
2	El Camino: A Breaking Bad Movie
2	Goliath
2	The Good Place
2	I Am the Night
2	The Loudest Voice
2	Mindhunter
2	Mr. Mercedes
2	Russian Doll
2	Schitt's Creek
2	Unbelievable
2	Watchmen

=== Series with multiple wins ===
Wins	Series
3	Fleabag
3	Succession
2	Chernobyl
