= Alita: Battle Angel (soundtrack) =

Alita: Battle Angel (Original Motion Picture Soundtrack)

Soundtrack album by Tom Holkenborg
- Released: February 14, 2019 (digital); February 15, 2019 (CD)
- Recorded: 2017–2019
- Genre: Orchestral; electronic; soul
- Length: 64:16
- Label: Milan; Fox Music
- Producer: James Cameron; Jon Landau

Tom Holkenborg chronology
Mortal Engines (2018)	Alita: Battle Angel (2019)	Terminator: Dark Fate (2019)

Singles from Alita: Battle Angel (Original Motion Picture Soundtrack)
- 1. "Swan Song" Released: January 24, 2019

Alita: Battle Angel (Original Motion Picture Soundtrack) is the soundtrack album composed by Tom Holkenborg for the 2019 film Alita: Battle Angel directed by Robert Rodriguez, based on the Yukito Kishiro's manga series Battle Angel Alita. The soundtrack was released by Milan Records and Fox Music digitally on February 14, 2019, coinciding with the United States theatrical release. A physical soundtrack was also released, the following day. The soundtrack featured 20 tracks of Holkenborg's score. A promotional song titled "Swan Song" co-written by Holkenborg and sung by Dua Lipa was released as a single on January 24, 2019 which was accompanied by the music video directed by Floria Sigismondi.

== Development ==
Tom Holkenborg watched the initial cut of the film in August 2017, and had discussed with director Robert Rodriguez and producers James Cameron and Jon Landau, about the film's music. Holkenborg stated that the specific instruction from the director and producers, were "to feel the heart of the film". He later joined the film as score composer in December 2017 and began working on the score. As science fiction and dystopian films were heavily reliant on electronic music, Holkenborg decided to have a different approach to the film score using orchestral themes. In his career as an instrumentalist, Holkenborg used organic instruments and strings, which felt him great to find "a combination between the vast experience of an orchestra and sound design with synthesizers".

Despite being a multi-genre film, Holkenborg approached it as a "personal story about Alita" and composed it in a way where "the whole score is meant to be [seen] through her eyes". He influenced orchestral sounds from the 1950s, which was reminiscent of Henry Mancini's musical scores for Casablanca (1942) and Touch of Evil (1958), as the film is set in border towns. Calling Alita's main theme as the "important one from the album", Holkenborg opined that "her theme needed to be very organic and acoustic in nature to emphasize her humanity. The audience needs to lean in to her, not lean back, which usually happens when you use purely electronic music". He also planned for using electronic music to the score, but decided against it, as "it might not help on carrying with the emotional backstory for Alita". He also composed themes for other main characters, that appear in the first 14 minutes of the film.

Holkenborg co-wrote the song "Swan Song" with Dua Lipa through Skype. On his collaboration with Lipa, Holkenborg said "It's super easy, most of the collaborations I've done in the past didn't happen in the same room, because of people's schedules. Everything is done remotely [...] Being in the same room is always great, but when that can't happen you do the best with what you've got."

== Track listing ==
All tracks are written by Tom Holkenborg.

No.	Title	Length
1.	"Discovery"	3:13
2.	"I Don't Even Know My Own Name"	5:44
3.	"What's Your Dream?"	3:16
4.	"Double Identity"	1:54
5.	"The Warrior Within"	3:31
6.	"A Dark Past"	1:29
7.	"In Time You'll Remember"	0:58
8.	"Nova's Orders"	2:48
9.	"Jackers Mission"	2:36
10.	"Unlocking the Past"	3:52
11.	"Whose Body Is This?"	2:06
12.	"Grewishka's Revenge"	4:23
13.	"Broken Doll"	2:34
14.	"With Me"	5:41
15.	"I'd Give You My Heart"	3:07
16.	"You Just Lost a Puppet"	2:30
17.	"What Did You Do?"	3:41
18.	"In the Clouds"	3:56
19.	"Raising the Sword"	1:43
20.	"Motorball"	5:14
Total length:		64:16

== Reception ==
Holkenborg's musical approach received positive response from critics. Film Music Central wrote "Holkenborg crafts the music in a way that keeps you engaged and grounded in the story". Calling it as "a great piece of work from Holkenborg", Blueprintreview's Scott Gilliland wrote "Alita: Battle Angel isn't a big stirring action and science fiction soundtrack as many would have expected, but, it is more like another of his recent soundtracks in 'Tombraider' in that it is more considered and gives the audience a chance to understand the world we are in and allow the characters to grow around evoke the feeling that although he is world building that our only focus is the main character. In this criterion he very much succeeded as he only begins to venture towards any noise and busyness in the big action set pieces and keeps any form of tech or electronica to a minimum, letting it live somewhere distant in the score."

James Southall of Movie Wave wrote "a more than decent action/adventure score which does sound like it's the work not just of a professional film composer but actually a competent one". The Spill Magazine's Samantha Stevens gave 8 out of 10 for the score and said "With subtle echo effects and a grandiose string-dominated crescendo after the intro, it is simultaneously futuristic and classical, emotional and enticing." Jonathan Broxton of Movie Music UK wrote "There are still areas of his work that feel inferior compared to his peers – the prominence of secondary themes being the biggest one – but, with that one caveat in mind, Alita: Battle Angel has turned out to be one of 2019's most unexpectedly pleasant surprises. The main theme is good, the action music is enjoyably hyperactive, and the instrumental richness is truly impressive." Anton Smit of Soundtrack World wrote "there is no dull moment on the album, where every minute is filled with a melody or a different rhythmic pattern".

== Personnel ==
Credits adapted from CD liner notes

Production

- Score composed, produced, programmed, mixed and mastered by: Tom Holkenborg
- Soundtrack producer: Dave Jordan
- Additional music producer: Antonio Di Iorio
- Additional synth programming: Jacopo Trifone, Jonas Friedman, Max Karmazyn
- Recordist: Alan Meyerson, Brad Haehnel, Tim Lauber, Kevin Globerman
- Score editor: Peter Myles
- Copyist: Edward Trybek, Henri Wilkinson
- Recording engineer: Marc Gebauer
- Technical engineer: Alex Ruger, Emily Rice
- Music co-ordinator: Joann Orgel
- Music supervisor: Johnny Choi
- Production manager: Pablo Manyer
- Liner notes: Robert Rodriguez

Instrumentation

- Bassoon: Kenneth Munday, Rose Corrigan
- Cello: Armen Ksajikian, Cecilia Tsan, Dane Little, Dennis Karmazyn, Eric Byers, Erika Duke-Kirkpatrick, Evgeny Tonkha, Jacob Braun, Michael Kaufman, Michelle Rearick, Paula Hochhalter, Trevor Handy, Vanessa Freebairn-Smith, Helen Altenbach, Steve Erdody
- Clarinet: Ralph Williams, Stuart Clark
- Contrabass: Christian Kollgaard, David Parmeter, Drew Dembowski, Edward Meares, Geoffrey Osika, Ian Walker, Michael Valerio, Nicolas Philippon, Stephen Dress, Thomas Harte, Nico Abondolo
- Flute: Ben Smolen, Heather Clark, Jennifer Olson, Geri Rotella
- Horn: Amy Rhine, Benjamin Jaber, Daniel Kelley, Dylan Hart, Ethan Berman, Jenny Kim, Katelyn Faraudo, Kaylet Torrez, Laura Brenes, Mark Adams, Mike McCoy, Paul Klintworth, Stephanie Stetson, Steven Becknell, Teag Reaves, David Everson
- Oboe: Lara Wickes, Jessica Pearlman
- Trombone: Alan Kaplan, Andrew Martin, William Reichenbach, Craig Gosnell, John Lofton, Michael Hoffman, Phillip Keen, Steven Suminski, Steven Trapani, Steven Holtman, William Booth, Alexander Iles
- Trumpet: Christopher Still, Daniel Fornero, James Wilt, Robert Schaer, Thomas Hooten, Wayne Bergeron, Jon Lewis
- Tuba: Gary Hickman, Doug Tornquist
- Viola: Aaron Oltman, Alma Fernandez, Andrew Duckles, Carolyn Riley, Corinne Sobolewski, David Walther, Jerome Gordon, Zach Dellinger, Jonathan Moerschel, Laura Pearson, Luke Maurer, Matthew Funes, Meredith Crawford, Michael Larco, Michael Whitson, Victor de Almeida, Shawn Mann
- Violin: Akiko Tarumoto, Alyssa Park, Amy Hershberger, Ana Landauer, Andrew Bulbrook, Benjamin Powell, Benjamin Jacobson, Caroline Campbell, Charlie Bisharat, Darius Campo, Dimitrie Leivici, Eun-Mee Ahn, Grace Oh, Hana Kim, Helen Nightengale, Irina Voloshina, Jessica Guideri, Joel Pargman, Kerenza Peacock, Kevin Connolly, Kevin Kumar, Lisa Liu, Lorand Lokuszta, Lorenz Gamma, Luanne Homzy, Marc Sazer, Max Karmazyn, Maya Magub, Natalie Leggett, Nathan Cole, Phillip Levy, Radu Pieptea, Rafael Rishik, Roberto Cani, Roger Wilkie, Sarah Thornblade, Serena McKinney, Shalini Vijayan, Songa Lee, Tamara Hatwan, Julie Gigante

Vocals

- Alto Vocals: Adriana Manfredi, Callista Hoffman-Campbell, Drea Pressley, Eleni Pantages, Jessica Rotter, Jessie Shulman, Karen Schwartz, Kasondra Kazanjian, Kristen Toedtman, Lesley Leighton, Michelle Hemmings, Niké St. Clair, Sara Mann, Sharmila G. Lash
- Soprano Vocals: Andrea Zomorodian, Anna Schubert, Ayana Haviv, Carrah Stamatakis, Christina Bristow, Courtney R. Taylor, Elissa Johnston, Elyse Willis, Harriet Fraser, Holly Sedillos, Karen Hogle Brown, Rebecca Tomlinson, Suzanne Waters, Tamara Bevard

Orchestra

- Orchestrated by: Edward Trybek, Henri Wilkinson, Jonathan Beard, Tom Holkenborg
- Orchestra conductor: Conrad Pope
- Choir contractor: Jasper Randall
- Score contractor: Peter Rotter
- Concertmaster: Bruce Dukov
- Stage Manager: Damon Tedesco, Peter Nelson

Management

- Executive producer for Milan Records: JC Chamboredon, Stefan Karrer
- Graphic design and layout: Shawn Lyon
- Music clearance: Ellen Ginsburg
- Business affairs: Tom Cavanaugh
- Executive in charge of music: Danielle Diego
- Music production supervisor: Rebecca Morellato
- Music production services: Michiel Groeneveld

== Release history ==
Region	Date	Format(s)	Catalog Number	Ref.
Various	February 14, 2019	Digital download; streaming	—N/a	
United States	February 15, 2019	CD	M2-37043	
United States	March 8, 2019	Vinyl	398 166-2	
France	February 19, 2019	CD	398 145-2	
Japan	March 6, 2019	CD	WPCR 18185	
Brazil	March 21, 2019	CD	398 145-2	

== Charts ==
Chart (2019)	Peak position
UK Soundtrack Albums (OCC)	33
US Billboard 200	125
US Independent Albums (Billboard)	50
US Soundtrack Albums (Billboard)	13

== Awards ==
At the 2019 Hollywood Music in Media Awards, Tom Holkenborg received a nomination for Best Original Score in a Sci-Fi/Fantasy Film losing to Alan Silvestri for Avengers: Endgame (2019). The original song "Swan Song" received a nomination for Best Original Song at the 24th Satellite Awards.
