= Tomb Raider (soundtrack) =

Tomb Raider: Original Motion Picture Soundtrack

Film score by Tom Holkenborg
- Released: March 9, 2018 (Digital); March 16, 2018 (Physical); August 24, 2018 (Vinyl)
- Recorded: January 2018
- Studio: AIR Lyndhurst Studios, London
- Genre: Film Score
- Length: 72:00
- Label: Sony Classical Records
- Producer: Tom Holkenborg

Tom Holkenborg chronology
The Dark Tower (2017)	Tomb Raider: Original Motion Picture Soundtrack (2018)	Mortal Engines (2018)

Tomb Raider chronology
Lara Croft: Tomb Raider – The Cradle of Life (2003)	Tomb Raider (2018)	Tomb Raider: The Legend of Lara Croft (2024–2025)

Professional ratings
Review scores
Source	Rating
AllMusic	4/5 stars
Soundtrack Geek	3/5 stars
Movie Wave	No Rating

Tomb Raider: Original Motion Picture Soundtrack is the film score to the film of the same name, based on the 2013 video game of the same name by Crystal Dynamics. The music was composed and arranged by Tom Holkenborg. It was released digitally on March 9, 2018, by Sony Classical Records with the physical edition being released on March 16, 2018, followed by the vinyl being released later on August 24, 2018.

The film also features "Run For Your Life" performed by K.Flay which appears in the end credits of the film.

== Background ==
On June 14, 2017, Tom Holkenborg was announced as the film's composer for Tomb Raider. He was originally scoring Zack Snyder's Justice League but was replaced by Danny Elfman. Holkenborg commented that "It pains me to leave the project, but a big thanks to Zack for asking me to be part of his vision, and I wish Danny, Joss, and Warner Bros all the best with Justice League."

For the basis of the score, Holkenborg looked to the late Jóhann Jóhannsson's score to Sicario. But the majority of his inspiration came from the film score album, Birdy by Peter Gabriel which served as the foundation for the island scenes in the film. On creating the sound for Tomb Raider, Holkenborg combined a bunch of different animal sounds to create a canvas for the score and then worked on top of that. He then employed an original approach with director Roar Uthaug, with an emphasis on raw sound design and music to portray the journey of Lara, one of which was through the use of strong percussion to give that sense of grittiness and realism.

Scoring took place over two days at AIR Lyndhurst Studios in London, with the London Studio Orchestra conducted by John Ashton Thomas. Aljoscha Christenhuß and Antonio Di Iorio provided additional music.

== Track listing ==
All music is composed by Tom Holkenborg.

No.	Title	Length
1.	"Return to Croft Manor"	8:13
2.	"Seeking Endurance"	1:09
3.	"The Bag"	1:49
4.	"Path of Paternal Secrets"	3:39
5.	"The Devil's Sea"	4:11
6.	"Let Yamatai Have Her"	13:23
7.	"Figure in the Night"	4:15
8.	"Remember This"	3:26
9.	"Never Give Up"	5:36
10.	"Karakuri Wall"	4:38
11.	"What Lies Underneath Yamatai"	8:35
12.	"There's No Time"	4:01
13.	"Becoming the Tomb Raider"	7:15
14.	"The Croft Legacy"	2:00
Total length:		72:00

== Personnel ==
- Score Composer, Producer and mixer & Synth Programming – Tom Holkenborg
- Additional Music – Aljoscha Christenhuß & Antonio Di Iorio
- Technical Score Engineer – Alex Ruger
- Additional Programming – Emily Rice & Jacopo Trifone
- Music Editor – Simon Changer
- Additional Music Editors – Ben Smithers & Arabella Winter
- Music Consultant – Bob Badami
- Score Orchestrations and Copyist – Jonathan Beard, Edward Trybek, Henri Wilkinson & Tom Holkenborg
- Librarian – Jill Streater
- Conductor – John Ashton Thomas
- Recording Engineer and mixer – Nick Wollage
- Music Production Services – Michael Groeneveld
