= Swan Song (song) =

2019 single by Dua Lipa

Single by Dua Lipa

from the album Alita: Battle Angel (Original Motion Picture Soundtrack)
- Released: 24 January 2019
- Recorded: 2018
- Studio: Conway (Los Angeles); TaP (London); Wolf Cousins (Stockholm)
- Genre: Electropop
- Length: 3:02
- Label: Warner Bros.
- Songwriters: Justin Tranter; Kennedi Lykken; Mattias Larsson; Robin Fredriksson; Tom Holkenborg; Dua Lipa
- Producer: Mattman & Robin

Dua Lipa singles chronology
| "Electricity" (2018) | "Swan Song" (2019) | "Don't Start Now" (2019) |

Music video
- "Swan Song" on YouTube

"Swan Song" (Note: Alternatively titled "Swan Song (From the Motion Picture 'Alita: Battle Angel')") is a song by English singer Dua Lipa for the soundtrack of 2019 film Alita: Battle Angel. Lipa co-wrote the song with Justin Tranter, Kennedi Lykken, Mattias Larsson, Robin Fredriksson and Tom Holkenborg, while the production was handled by Mattman & Robin. Holkenborg also composed the soundtrack and orchestrations he created for it are used in the song. Announced in December 2018, the song was released for digital download and streaming on 24 January 2019 through Warner Bros. Records as the soundtrack's lead single.

"Swan Song" is an electropop song set to muted electronics, cinematic horns and orchestral stabs. In the song, Lipa references 1980s AIDS activist group ACT UP and sings about new beginnings and society using their voices to fight for what they believe in. Several critics praised the song for the production. It was nominated for Best Original Song at the 24th Satellite Awards. Commercially, the song reached number 24 on the UK Singles Chart and also reached the top 50 of charts in Belgium (Flanders), Ireland, Lithuania and Scotland. The song was awarded a silver certification in the UK and a gold one in Poland.

The music video for "Swan Song" was directed by Floria Sigismondi and accompanied the song's release. A blockbuster visual, it follows a loose synopsis of Alita: Battle Angel, specifically with the self-discovery themes. The video features Lipa and her crew in the fictional Iron City of the film. They encounter a giant robot and eventually Alita, before Lipa transforms into her towards the end. Several critics complimented the video's sci-fi themes. An acoustic version and a remixes extended play were released for further promotion.

== Background and development ==
At the end of 2018, Dua Lipa was contacted about an opportunity to create a song for the new film Alita: Battle Angel, which James Cameron and Robert Rodriguez had been working on. She accepted as she was instantly drawn to the film's titular character, Alita, and wanted to be a part of the film. The film team thought that Lipa would be a perfect fit for Alita: Battle Angel after seeing her music video for "New Rules". They thought her performance had the "kick-ass strength, power and attitude" Alita embodies in the film. Lipa was given the film's trailer and synopsis to begin, while she later got to see it prior to working on the song.

Lipa wrote "Swan Song" alongside Justin Tranter, Kennedi Lykken, Mattias Larsson, Robin Fredriksson and Tom Holkenborg. The singer found it exciting to write a song she already had a concept for and experiment with sounds that were different from what she was working on with her album. Holkenborg had composed the score for the film; the writers decided to take the orchestrations he created and use them in the song. The production was handled by Mattman & Robin. "Swan Song" was recorded at Conway Studios in Los Angeles, TaP Studio in London and Wolf Cousins Studios in Stockholm. Serban Ghenea mixed the song at MixStar Studios in Virginia Beach, Virginia and Randy Merrill mastered it at Sterling Sound in New York.

== Music and lyrics ==
"Swan Song"
"Swan Song" is an electropop track that features vocal chants, cinematic horns and orchestral stabs while Lipa uses triumphant vocals. The bridge paraphrases "silence equals death", the motto of advocacy group ACT UP, and the lyrics are about standing up for what one believes in.

Musically, "Swan Song" is an electropop track. It is constructed in verse–chorus form and composed in the time signature of 4/4 time in the key of C minor, with a tempo of 96 beats per minute and a chord progression of A♭–B♭–Cm–Gm7. The song begins with a burst of horns and heavy drums. The production features muted electronics, airy synths, stabbing brass samples, vocal chants, percolating percussion, cinematic horns, orchestral stabs, a driving melody, powerful strings and a mechanized, cybernetic and pulsating beat. Lipa builds on an urgency feeling in the bridge. The synths build up to the minimal chorus, while the sections progress to the final booming hook.

Lipa uses triumphant vocals, ranging from G_{3} to D_{5}. In the song, Lipa sings about new beginnings and mentions a series of obstacles she has had to overcome. The writers were inspired by how Alita fights for the lives of marginalized people. They wrote the song about how society constantly needs to speak up about what they believe in and the injustices of the world, as well as how their voices always need to be used; this message was also inspired by the film's empowering message. The song additionally took inspiration from the 1980s advocacy group ACT UP, who formed in response to the HIV/AIDS crisis at the time. The bridge paraphrases the group's motto "silence equals death" and the song's title contradicts its meaning. "Swan Song" ends with an abrupt climax that leads to a two-second fade out.

== Release and promotion ==
On 17 December 2018, it was announced that Lipa would record "Swan Song" for Alita: Battle Angel and that the song would be released ahead of the film's 14 February 2019 release. The same day, Lipa revealed the cover art. Also in December 2018, the film's trailer was released, featuring clip of the song. The following month, it was announced that the song would be released on 25 January 2019. Lipa began teasing the song on social media thereafter. Prior to the song's release, it was previewed in a TV spot for Alita: Battle Angel.

"Swan Song" was released for digital download and streaming on 24 January 2019 through Warner Bros. Records as the lead single from the film's soundtrack, being released a day earlier than originally intended. The following day, the song was sent for radio airplay in Australia and Italy. On 28 January 2019, it was sent to US adult contemporary radio formats and contemporary hit radio formats the following day. While promoting the song, Lipa wanted viewers to find a piece of themselves in Alita and inspire one to do good in everyday life. "Swan Song" was included as the closing track on physical releases of the Milan Records-released Alita: Battle Angel soundtrack. On 22 March 2019, an acoustic version of the song was released. An extended play featuring remixes by DJ Shadow and NastyNasty, Maya Jane Coles, aboutagirl and Calibre was released on 12 April 2019.

== Reception ==
In Time, Raisa Bruner viewed "Swan Song" as a "clear battle anthem" where Lipa's "mellifluous" voice adds "weight and smoothness, and a welcome human element". She concluded by stating it echoes a "mix of electronic rhythms and a touch of the real". Writing for The New York Times, Jon Pareles compared the backup chants to "remnants of past civilizations" and thought the song "puts human aspiration in electronic armor". Brennan Carley of GQ thought Lipa treated the song as a "proper" solo single instead of a soundtrack song while also stating it could be nominated for an Academy Award. Additionally, he said the song "feels properly high stakes, but also kind of weird and murky until its head-rattling chorus kicks in". Ryan Reed of Rolling Stone called the song "cinematic" while Uproxx's Chloe Gilke named "Swan Song" a "powerful", "confident, anthemic banger" and Lake Schatz of Consequence viewed it as a "defiant number".

For Idolator, Mike Nied named "Swan Song" a "soaring anthem" with a "suitably epic production" that "could easily be [Lipa's] next song to dominate the charts". Chris DeVille of Stereogum complimented how Lipa experimented with the track and compared it to Lorde's "Yellow Flicker Beat" (2014). In Popjustice, Peter Robinson praised the "creative and luxurious production" that is "sparse where it needs to be and full of dramatic and unpredictable little flourishes" while also complimenting how the song fades out at the end. Writing for Audacy, Michael Cerio viewed the song as a "sweeping epic, building like a battle hymn into a post-apocolyptic [sic] banger". "Swan Song" was nominated for Best Original Song at the 24th Satellite Awards.

In February 2019, "Swan Song" debuted at number 25 on the UK Singles Chart. In its third week, the song reached a peak of number 24. It spent a total of eight weeks on the chart. The British Phonographic Industry (BPI) awarded the song a silver certification in November 2021 for selling 200,000 track-equivalent units in the UK. In Ireland and Scotland, the song had respective peaks of numbers 24 and 27. Additionally, the song reached number 50 in Belgium (Flanders), 63 in Portugal, 67 in Sweden and 96 in Switzerland. In 2020, the song was awarded a gold certification from the Polish Society of the Phonographic Industry (ZPAV) for track-equivalent sales of 10,000 units in Poland. It reached number 99 in both Canada and Germany. In the United States, the song spent five weeks on the Billboard Bubbling Under Hot 100 Singles chart, peaking at number four. In Oceania, it reached number 68 in Australia and entered the NZ Hot Singles chart at number five.

== Music video ==
The music video is set in the Iron City from Alita: Battle Angel and features Lipa transforming into the titular character.

The music video for "Swan Song" was directed by Floria Sigismondi and filmed in December 2018. Lipa described filming the video as different from ones she had done before as a movie team was working on it and CGI was used. She knew she wanted to do a fighting scene and had people from Alita: Battle Angel come and help her out and teach her how to do the fighting. The only time Lipa had to rehearse for the videos shoot was while she was in Toronto writing for her album so she would spend the entire day in the studio and then go and practice the moves every night for two to three hours. Sigismondi wanted the video to showcase the self-discovery themes of Alita: Battle Angel. She thought that the film is a powerful story for any girl who does not know her power, a notion the director wanted to play with by putting Lipa into Alita's world and using Alita to help Lipa on a journey to discover she's stronger than she knew. Along with the song's announcement, Lipa revealed that it would also receive a music video. The video accompanied the single's release on 24 January 2019. It follows a loose synopsis of the film and is a blockbuster production.

The visual is set in the fictional Iron City from Alita: Battle Angel. It begins with Lipa and her crew rummaging through ruins and picking through mountains of trash, looking for items of value. The singer wears a chain mail dress with a black leather corset alongside heavy gold and silver chain necklaces, chunky lace-up platform boots, black pants and dark eye makeup. Lipa and her crew eventually perform dance and martial arts choreography in the city. Following this, a giant robot pops up to attack them but they escape. Lipa reemerges in another setting as if she had woken up from a nightmare and makes her way to a mirror. She encounters Alita in the mirror and performs a martial arts inspired dance break with her. The singer then transforms into Alita wearing a skin-tight black crop top. To close the video, she puts her cyborg fist into the air, posing in front of the Iron City.

Elizabeth Aubrey of NME described the video as "sci-fi, futuristic". Robinson thought it marked "the best rubbish dump-based pop video" since "Keep Your Head Up" (2009) by Girls Can't Catch. For Clash, Robin Murray viewed the video as "ambitious" and noted the sci-fi theme reminiscent of the film. Cerio compared the video to the 2008 film WALL-E. Nied called the music video "dramatic" and thought it does "a great job integrating Dua into the film's world". Gilke viewed the video as "cinematic" and thought it is "a perfect match" to the song.

== Track listings ==
- Digital download and streaming
1. "Swan Song (From the Motion Picture 'Alita: Battle Angel')" – 3:02
- Digital download and streaming – acoustic
1. "Swan Song (From the Motion Picture 'Alita: Battle Angel')" [acoustic] – 3:09
- Digital EP – remixes
1. "Swan Song (From the Motion Picture 'Alita: Battle Angel')" [DJ Shadow and NastyNasty remix] – 3:55
2. "Swan Song (From the Motion Picture 'Alita: Battle Angel')" [Maya Jane Coles rework] – 3:07
3. "Swan Song (From the Motion Picture 'Alita: Battle Angel')" [aboutagirl remix] – 3:24
4. "Swan Song (From the Motion Picture 'Alita: Battle Angel')" [Calibre remix] – 3:39

== Personnel ==
- Dua Lipa – vocals
- Mattman & Robin – production, programming, drums, percussion, guitar, piano, bass, synths, backing vocals, strings
- Lorna Blackwood – vocal production
- Kennedi Lykken – backing vocals
- Tom Holkenborg – piano, strings, bass, brass, synths
- John Hanes – engineering
- Serban Ghenea – mixing
- Randy Merrill – mastering

== Charts ==
Weekly chart performance for "Swan Song"
| Chart (2019) | Peak position |
|---|---|
| Australia (ARIA) | 68 |
| Belgium (Ultratop 50 Flanders) | 50 |
| Belgium (Ultratip Bubbling Under Wallonia) | 1 |
| Canada Hot 100 (Billboard) | 99 |
| Canada CHR/Top 40 (Billboard) | 31 |
| Canada Hot AC (Billboard) | 50 |
| China Airplay/FL (Billboard) | 4 |
| Czech Republic Airplay (ČNS IFPI) | 46 |
| Czech Republic Singles Digital (ČNS IFPI) | 31 |
| Finland Airplay (Radiosoittolista) | 55 |
| France (SNEP) | 196 |
| Germany (GfK) | 99 |
| Greece International (IFPI) | 27 |
| Hungary (Stream Top 40) | 11 |
| Ireland (IRMA) | 24 |
| Lithuania (AGATA) | 17 |
| Mexico (Billboard Ingles Airplay) | 1 |
| Netherlands (Single Tip) | 4 |
| Netherlands (Tipparade) | 1 |
| New Zealand Hot Singles (Recorded Music NZ) | 5 |
| Portugal (AFP) | 63 |
| Scotland Singles (OCC) | 27 |
| Slovakia Singles Digital (ČNS IFPI) | 21 |
| Sweden (Sverigetopplistan) | 67 |
| Switzerland (Schweizer Hitparade) | 96 |
| UK Singles (OCC) | 24 |
| US Bubbling Under Hot 100 (Billboard) | 4 |
| US Adult Pop Airplay (Billboard) | 39 |
| US Dance Club Songs (Billboard) | 24 |
| US Pop Airplay (Billboard) | 21 |

Annual chart rankings for "Swan Song"
| Chart (2019) | Rank |
|---|---|
| Tokyo (Tokio Hot 100) | 78 |

== Certifications ==
Certifications and sales for "Swan Song"
| Region | Certification | Certified units/sales |
|---|---|---|
| Canada (Music Canada) | Gold | 40,000^{‡} |
| Poland (ZPAV) | Gold | 10,000^{‡} |
| United Kingdom (BPI) | Silver | 200,000^{‡} |
^{‡} Sales+streaming figures based on certification alone.

== Release history ==
Release dates and formats for "Swan Song"
| Region | Date | Format(s) | Version | Label | Ref. |
|---|---|---|---|---|---|
| Various | 24 January 2019 | Digital download; streaming | Original | Warner Bros. | |
| Australia | 25 January 2019 | Radio airplay | Original | Warner Bros. | |
| Italy | 25 January 2019 | Radio airplay | Original | Warner Bros. | |
| United States | 28 January 2019 | Adult contemporary radio | Original | Warner Bros. | |
| United States | 29 January 2019 | Contemporary hit radio | Original | Warner Bros. | |
| Various | 22 March 2019 | Digital download; streaming | Acoustic | Warner Bros. | |
| Various | 12 April 2019 | Digital download; streaming | Remixes EP | Warner Bros. | |
