= Mortal Engines (soundtrack) =

Mortal Engines (Original Motion Picture Soundtrack)

Film score by Tom Holkenborg
- Released: December 14, 2018
- Recorded: October 2017–July 2018
- Studio: Michael Fowler Centre (Wellington, New Zealand)
- Genre: Film score
- Length: 70:08
- Label: Back Lot Music
- Producer: Tom Holkenborg

Tom Holkenborg chronology
| Tomb Raider (2018) | Mortal Engines (2018) | Alita: Battle Angel (2019) |

Mortal Engines (Original Motion Picture Soundtrack) is the soundtrack to the 2018 film of the same name featuring musical score by Tom Holkenborg. The score was recorded during October 2017 to July 2018 at the Michael Fowler Centre concert hall with New Zealand Symphony Orchestra performing the score and mixed at Park Road Post in New Zealand. The score blends and overlays modern electronic and synth-based score with orchestra. The album was released by Back Lot Music on December 14, 2018.

== Development ==
Tom Holkenborg received the first script of Mortal Engines from the producers in early 2017, and after reading it, he immediately called the producer regarding his involvement in the film. After completing the score for Tomb Raider (2018) in London, he went to New Zealand and met Peter Jackson, Fran Walsh and the director Christian Rivers, to discuss about the film and its music. Thereafter, his involvement was confirmed by the team, a week later.

The score was recorded at New Zealand from October 2017 to July 2018, with the New Zealand Symphony Orchestra performing the score. The goal was intended to create a score that blends "modern film music" with the likes of Mad Max: Fury Road (2015) and Deadpool (2016) and at the same "honoring the traditions of using thematic material with recognizable melodies played over soaring strings and brass" and to acknowledge the music of "classic Hollywood". He mixed the synth and electronic music with the orchestral portions, thereby considering it as his evolved score till date.

For London, he researched on classical compositions such as Richard Wagner's "Ride of the Valkyries" and Hector Berlioz's Symphonie fantastique where brass is heavily featured in the film's music. In an interaction with Clint Worthington of Consequence, he recalled an incident on a garbage truck driving away when he was at the dentist's office, and told his assistants that was the sound he wanted to look for. They collected some of the garbage sounds recorded on YouTube, which made the exact sound he heard. Later, with the help of cross-convolution technique, he assembled the garbage track sounds and blend with the brass music, that became the theme for Shrike (Stephen Lang).

== Track listing ==
| No. | Title | Length |
|---|---|---|
| 1. | "London Suite In C Major" | 8:54 |
| 2. | "No-One You Know" | 2:51 |
| 3. | "The Chase" | 1:08 |
| 4. | "Welcome To London" | 2:39 |
| 5. | "Miss Valentine" | 4:19 |
| 6. | "This Is For My Mother" | 1:36 |
| 7. | "The Outlands" | 4:52 |
| 8. | "A Resurrected Man" | 4:44 |
| 9. | "Ms. Fang" | 2:05 |
| 10. | "In a Sea of Clouds" | 1:28 |
| 11. | "The Weapon of the Ancients" | 2:08 |
| 12. | "Shan Guo" | 3:21 |
| 13. | "I Am the Meteor" | 2:15 |
| 14. | "First Strike" | 2:09 |
| 15. | "Night Sundered" | 4:10 |
| 16. | "In the Shadow of a Shrine" | 3:29 |
| 17. | "No Going Back" | 5:58 |
| 18. | "Windflower" | 2:28 |
| 19. | "The 13th Floor Elevator" | 4:40 |
| 20. | "Alive and Together" | 4:52 |
| Total length: | | 70:06 |

== Reception ==
Zanobard Reviews gave 6/10 to the album and wrote "Mortal Engines is a decent score. The London Suite at the start of the album is absolutely fantastic, and honestly worth the price of admission just on its own. The main themes that Holkenborg has composed are also excellent, though unfortunately they are used so sparingly it feels like a bit of a waste. Much of the album also succumbs to the standard generic action music trap, which is such a shame as the suite promised so much and the remaining tracks just don't deliver. There's a lot of wasted potential here, but on the upside there are also some truly amazing compositions, and a whole new world has been opened up with Tom Holkenborg."

Luke Bunting of Set the Tape rated 4 (out of 5) to the album and said: "Mortal Engines provides plenty of rollicking action tracks and thrills to standout amidst all of the season's blockbuster scores. It represents both a step forward for Holkenborg's career and somewhat of a missed opportunity for the film itself." Greg Wheeler of The Review Geek gave 7.5 out of 10 to the album, commenting: "If you're looking for a suitably epic soundtrack full of loud, brass segments, rolling drums and a grand sense of adventure, you can't really go wrong with this soundtrack. At times it's almost exhausting, chock full of adrenaline-fuelled chases and action but managing to capture the scale of the film perfectly. It's a bittersweet reminder of what could have been with this fantasy epic but although the film may have been disappointing, its soundtrack is anything but."

== Personnel ==
Credits adapted from liner notes.

- Music composed, produced, programmed, mixed and mastered by – Tom Holkenborg
- Additional music – Antonio Di Iorio
- Additional synth programming – Emily Rice, Jonas Friedman, Max Karmazyn
- Additional mixing – Nigel Scott
- Recording – John Neill
- Recording engineer – Graham Kennedy
- Technical engineer – Alex Ruger, Jacopo Trifone
- Lacquer cut – Dave
- Copyist – Jordan Cox
- Orchestra – The New Zealand Symphony Orchestra
- Orchestration – Edward Trybek, Henri Wilkinson, Jonathan Beard, Tom Holkenborg
- Orchestra conductor – Conrad Pope
- Choir – Voices New Zealand Chamber Choir
- Choir conductor – Karen Grylls
- Solo vocals – Morag Atchinson, Pepe Becker
