= Elliot Newman =

American visual effects artist

- Occupation: Visual effects artist

Elliot Newman is a British visual effects artist. He was nominated for an Academy Award in the category Best Visual Effects for the film The Lion King.

== Selected filmography ==
- The Lion King (2019; co-nominated with Robert Legato, Adam Valdez and Andrew R. Jones)
