= Andrew R. Jones =

American visual effects artist

- Occupation: Visual effects artist
- Years active: 1997–present

Andrew R. Jones is a visual effects artist most known for being part of the Oscar-winning team that did the visuals to Avatar and The Jungle Book.

Jones directed a segment of The Animatrix, "The Final Flight of the Osiris".

== Oscars ==
Both of these are in the category of Best Visual Effects

- 77th Academy Awards-Nominated for I, Robot. Nomination shared with Joe Letteri, Erik Nash and John Nelson. Lost to Spider-Man 2.
- 82nd Academy Awards-Avatar. Shared with Richard Baneham, Joe Letteri and Stephen Rosenbaum. Won.
- 89th Academy Awards-The Jungle Book. Shared with Robert Legato, Adam Valdez, and Dan Lemmon. Won.
- 92nd Academy Awards-The Lion King. Shared with Robert Legato, Adam Valdez, and Elliot Newman. Lost to 1917.

== Filmography ==
- Titanic (1997) - Digital stunt sequence supervisor
- Godzilla (1998) - Animation supervisor
- Final Fantasy: The Spirits Within (2001) - Animation director
- The Animatrix (2003) – "Final Flight of the Osiris" (2003) (short) - Director
- I, Robot (2004) - Animation supervisor
- Superman Returns (2006) - Animation supervisor
- The Lovely Bones (2009) - Animation consultant
- Avatar (2009) - Animation supervisor
- Parallel (2011) (short) - Director
- World War Z (2013) - Animation consultant
- Blackhat (2015) - Visual effects supervisor
- The Jungle Book (2016) - Animation supervisor
- The Lion King (2019) - Animation supervisor
- Prehistoric Planet Immersive (2024) - Director
- Lilo & Stitch (2025) - Consulting vfx supervisor
- Prehistoric Planet (2025) - Director
