= Adam Valdez =

Visual effects artist

Adam Valdez is a visual effects supervisor. Best known for his works on Oscar winning films The Lord of the Rings: The Fellowship of the Ring (2001) and The Lord of the Rings: The Two Towers (2002) as an animation head, though did not get the nomination. Valdez worked as lead visual supervisor in acclaimed films such as 10,000 BC (2008), The Chronicles of Narnia: Prince Caspian (2008), John Carter (2012), World War Z (2013), Maleficent (2014), The Jungle Book (2016) for which he won the Academy Award for Best Visual Effects at 89th Academy Awards. In 2020, he received his second Academy Award nomination for Best Visual Effects for The Lion King (2019).

== Filmography ==
Year	Title	Notes
2024	Mufasa: The Lion King	(visual effects supervisor)
2019	The Lion King	(visual effects supervisor: MPC)
2016	The Jungle Book	(visual effects supervisor: MPC)
2014	Maleficent	(vfx supervisor: MPC)
2013	World War Z	(visual effects supervisor: MPC)
2012	John Carter	(visual effects supervisor: MPC)
2010	The Chronicles of Narnia: The Voyage of the Dawn Treader	(visual effects supervisor: MPC)
2010	The Wolfman	(visual effects supervisor: MPC)
2008	The Chronicles of Narnia: Prince Caspian	(animation supervisor)
2008	10,000 BC	(animation supervisor: MPC)
2007	1408	(CG artist: MPC)
2004	AVP: Alien Vs. Predator	(visual effects supervisor: MPC)
2002	The Lord of the Rings: The Two Towers	(animation department head: Weta Digital)
2001	The Lord of the Rings: The Fellowship of the Ring	(animation supervisor: Weta Digital)
1999	Forces of Nature	(animation supervisor)
1997	Starship Troopers	(lead character animator: Tippett Studio)
1996	Dragonheart	(animator/animatics)
1996	Tremors 2: Aftershocks (Video)	(technical advisor: Tippett Studio)
1995	Three Wishes	(effects animator)
1993	Jurassic Park	(computer systems: Tippett Studio)
1993	RoboCop 3	(computer graphics: Tippett Studio - as Adam J. Valdez)
1990	RoboCop 2	(assistant mold maker: robot monster crew - as Adam J. Valdez)
