= Planet of the Apes (video game) =

2001 video game

- Developers: Visiware (PC and PlayStation); Torus Games (Game Boy Advance and Game Boy Color)
- Publishers: Ubi Soft; Fox Interactive
- Producer: Tim Hall
- Designers: Jean-Francois Graffard; Raffi Messant
- Programmer: Matus Kirchmayer
- Writer: Jean-Francois Graffard
- Composers: Lionel Gaget; Raphaël Gesqua
- Series: Planet of the Apes
- Platforms: Windows, Game Boy Color, Game Boy Advance, PlayStation
- Release: September 20, 2001: Windows; NA: September 20, 2001; FRA: October 4, 2001; UK: October 5, 2001; AU: October 25, 2001 Game Boy Color; UK: November 23, 2001; NA: November 27, 2001 Game Boy Advance; UK: November 23, 2001; NA: November 29, 2001 PlayStation; UK: June 28, 2002; NA: August 21, 2002
- Genre: Action-adventure
- Mode: Single-player

Planet of the Apes is a 2001 action-adventure video game in the Planet of the Apes franchise. The franchise's first video game, it was released as a tie-in to the 2001 Planet of the Apes film, though the plot is inspired by Pierre Boulle's 1963 novel and the 1968 film adaptation. Fox Interactive contracted Visiware to develop the game for Windows and PlayStation and partnered with Ubi Soft as co-publisher. Torus Games developed a Game Boy Advance and Game Boy Color versions, which are based on the 1968 film and its 1970 sequel.

In Visiware's game, the player controls Ulysses, an astronaut who crashes on a future Earth where intelligent apes dominate humans. Ulysses explores various environments, aiding a human resistance movement who regard him as a prophesied savior and uncovering the secrets underlying ape society. Versions of series characters, such as Zira, Cornelius, Zaius, Ursus and Nova, appear alongside new characters and species.

The game's release was delayed for three years due to problems with the long postponed film remake and Fox Interactive's decision to co-publish with another company. The delays were such that the game missed the film's release date. When it finally debuted on September 20, 2001, it met with largely negative reviews on the PlayStation and PC along with mixed reviews on the Game Boy versions, with the chief criticism being its weak controls and gameplay.

== Gameplay ==
Planet of the Apes is an action-adventure game played from a third-person view. The player controls Ulysses, an astronaut who has crash-landed on a planet inhabited by intelligent apes, with whom he must engage in battle to survive. For this, he utilizes unarmed hand-to-hand combat, clubs, knives and firearms. Items, such as weapons, may be collected in the inventory for later use. There are three different modes by which to explore any given level: Normal (non-violent traversal), Athletic (violent conflict) and Stealth (covert action). The game also features puzzle solving, like searching down a key card to unlock the next level. The player's progression can only be saved with the completion of each level.

== Synopsis ==
After drifting in space for centuries, astronaut Ulysses and his crew crash land on a planet in the year 3889. They find primitive humans, but are attacked by hunters on horseback who are revealed to be intelligent apes. The apes kill the crew and capture Ulysses, bringing him to a medical center for study. Human slave Jonah sneaks Ulysses a key that allows him to escape. Exploring the center, Ulysses overhears the apes Zira and Dr. Zaius discussing his fate; Zaius wants him executed. Eventually, Ulysses fakes his death and is brought to a morgue. There, Jonah and his friends reveal that Ulysses is on Earth, and that his arrival fulfills an ancient prophecy that a savior would return to restore humankind.

The human rebels give Ulysses one piece of an ancient relic and instruct him to retrieve the other two hidden by other tribes of humans. Ulysses heads to a ruined city, where he frees the human Nova and finds the second relic piece guarded by gorilla General Ursus. He also finds a secret file revealing that Ursus plans to use chimpanzee Dr. Cornelius' human genetics research, combined with information gleaned from studying ancient human sites, to advance the gorillas over the other apes. With help from Nova and her brother Mathias, Ulysses heads to Ape University, where Cornelius agrees to destroy his research so the gorillas cannot misuse it. Ulysses attempts to rescue Jonah from an ape prison; Jonah dies, but tells Ulysses the final relic piece is in the State Archives. Ulysses recovers the final piece and returns to Nova and Mathias.

The three pieces combine to form a map to the "Forbidden Place", located at the Statue of Liberty, which leads to The Pentagon. There, he learns the history of how the apes took over the planet: after a devastating war, humans bred genetically advanced apes as slaves. The apes rebelled and killed most humans; survivors escaped to a subterranean "Ark Project". Ulysses makes contact with the Arkanites, advanced humans still living underground, and encourages them to reunite with their brethren on the surface to defeat the apes. With his evidence, Ulysses travels to the Ape Palace to expose General Ursus before the council. Ursus is arrested, and Dr. Zaius releases Ulysses. The closing scene shows Ulysses departing with Nova, while the human forces and Arkanites amass to attack the apes.

== Development ==
=== PC and PlayStation version ===
In 1998, 20th Century Fox greenlit the most recent of several attempts at a Planet of the Apes film remake, to be produced by James Cameron. The company's video game division Fox Interactive had already started to develop a video game tie-in the previous year. Cameron dropped out and the film project went on hold, but confident a remake would progress sooner or later, Fox proceeded with the video game. It was the first ever Planet of the Apes video game; Fox had attempted a game for the Atari 2600, but abandoned it amid the video game crash of 1983 (new designers completed and released this game as Revenge of the Apes in 2003). Fox Interactive contracted French video game developer Visiware to design the Planet of the Apes game. With the film in limbo, the creators developed a new story inspired by Pierre Boulle's original novel Planet of the Apes and the 1968 film version. The designers felt an action-adventure game would best suit the material and available technology. They developed the game for PC, PlayStation, and Sega Dreamcast, though they scrapped the Dreamcast version when Sega discontinued the console. Rather than publish the game themselves, Fox Interactive opted to co-publish with a third party. This move, which industry professionals took as a sign that Fox Interactive was in decline, resulted in major production delays.

The game was officially announced at the Electronic Entertainment Expo 1999. The film project subsequently went forward under director Tim Burton; the film, released as Planet of the Apes in 2001, had a substantially different premise and story than the video game. Fox launched a major marketing campaign for the game in 2000, but release was delayed into 2001. Despite the long development, the game missed the July 27, 2001 debut of Tim Burton's film, though Fox Interactive stated that they hoped it would reduce confusion among consumers expecting a straightforward tie-in. On September 6, 2001, Fox Interactive announced a new co-publishing partnership for all its titles with Ubisoft, enabling them to finally release Planet of the Apes. The PC version appeared in North American stores on September 20, 2001, and was released in France, the United Kingdom, and Australia on October 4, October 5, and October 25, respectively. A port for PlayStation was released the following year in the United Kingdom on June 28, 2002, and in North America on August 21, 2002.

=== Game Boy version ===
In addition, Ubisoft planned a version for Game Boy Advance and Game Boy Color. Developed by Torus Games, versions for Game Boy Color and Game Boy Advance were released in the United Kingdom on November 23, 2001, and in North America on November 27, and November 29, respectively. The Game Boy version is considerably different from Visiware's PC and PlayStation game; it is a side-scroller and follows the plot of the 1968 film and its 1970 sequel, Beneath the Planet of the Apes. The player controls human Ben (originally known as Brent in Beneath the Planet of the Apes) as he searches for the films' hero, Taylor, over the course of ten levels, fighting ape warriors and other enemies.

== Reception ==
Reception

Aggregate scores
Aggregator	Score
GameRankings	(PC) 48.79% (PS) 60.00% (GBA) 59.44% (GBC) 40.00%
Metacritic	(PC) 41/100 (GBA) 54/100

Review scores
Publication	Score
AllGame	(PC) 2/5
GameSpot	(PC) 3.1/10
GameZone	(PC) 6.5/10
IGN	(PC) 4/10 (GBA) 6/10

During its lengthy development cycle, Planet of the Apes generated negative press prior to its release. Its gameplay was poorly received at its Electronic Entertainment Expo previews, with many commenters comparing it unfavorably to similar older games like Doom. Additionally, some critics considered Fox Interactive's decision to hire Visiware a misstep, as French developers of the period had a reputation for creating games with solid graphics but poor play. Others questioned the wisdom of basing the game on the decades-old original films rather than the remake.

Upon release, the PC and PlayStation versions received negative reviews from critics. Looking at the PC version, review aggregator website Metacritic calculated a score of 41/100 based on eleven critics, indicating "generally unfavorable reviews". By comparison, GameRankings calculated a score of 48.79% for the PC version, based on fourteen reviews, and 60.00% for the PlayStation version, based on one review. Erik Wolpaw of GameSpot called Planet of the Apes an "ugly, boring Tomb Raider clone", considering the game's environments, combat mechanics, and puzzles weak. Ivan Sulic of IGN wrote, "it's not that Planet of the Apes is truly bad across the boards -- just that it's truly mediocre," finding the controls and gameplay middling and the graphics out of date. Nick Woods of AllGame enjoyed the dialogue-heavy story sequences, but wrote that the positive elements could not make up for the nauseating interface and movement. GameZone's review found the sound and graphics to be highlights, but wrote that overall, the game "doesn't really toe the mark".

The Game Boy versions received mixed reviews. Looking at the Game Boy Advance version, Metacritic calculated an average score of 54/100 based on six reviews, indicating "mixed or average reviews". GameRankings calculated a 59.44% average for the Game Boy Advance version, based on nine reviews, and a 40.00% average for the Game Boy Color version, based on one review. Hilary Goldstein of IGN gave the game a rating of 6.0 out of 10, calling it a "decent side-scroller that fails to truly impress".
