= Planet of the Apes =

American science fiction media franchise

- Official franchise logo
- Created by: Pierre Boulle
- Original work: La Planète des singes (1963)
- Owner: 20th Century Studios
- Years: 1963–present

Print publications
- Books: List of books
- Novel: La Planète des singes (1963)
- Comics: List of comics

Films and television
- Films: Original series: Planet of the Apes (1968); Beneath the Planet of the Apes (1970); Escape from the Planet of the Apes (1971); Conquest of the Planet of the Apes (1972); Battle for the Planet of the Apes (1973); Remake: Planet of the Apes (2001); Reboot series: Rise of the Planet of the Apes (2011); Dawn of the Planet of the Apes (2014); War for the Planet of the Apes (2017); Kingdom of the Planet of the Apes (2024)
- Television series: Planet of the Apes (1974)
- Web series: Before the Dawn of the Apes (2014)
- Animated series: Return to the Planet of the Apes (1975)

Games
- Video games: Planet of the Apes (2001); Revenge of the Apes (2003); Planet of the Apes: Last Frontier (2017); Crisis on the Planet of the Apes VR (2018)

Audio
- Soundtracks: Rise of the Planet of the Apes; Dawn of the Planet of the Apes; War for the Planet of the Apes; Kingdom of the Planet of the Apes

Planet of the Apes is a media franchise consisting of films, books, television series, comics, and other media about a post-apocalyptic world in which humans and intelligent apes clash for control as the dominant species. The franchise started with French author Pierre Boulle's 1963 science fiction novel La Planète des singes, translated into English as Planet of the Apes or Monkey Planet. Its 1968 film adaptation, Planet of the Apes, was a critical and commercial hit, initiating a series of sequels, tie-ins, and derivative works. Arthur P. Jacobs produced the first five Apes films through APJAC Productions for distributor 20th Century Fox; following his death in 1973, Fox controlled the franchise, before its acquisition by Disney in 2019.

Four sequels followed the original film from 1970 to 1973: Beneath the Planet of the Apes, Escape from the Planet of the Apes, Conquest of the Planet of the Apes, and Battle for the Planet of the Apes. They did not approach the critical acclaim of the original, but were commercially successful, spawning a live-action television series in 1974 and an animated series in 1975. Plans for a film remake stalled in "development hell" for over 10 years before the 2001 release of Planet of the Apes, directed by Tim Burton. A reboot film series commenced in 2011 with Rise of the Planet of the Apes, which was followed by Dawn of the Planet of the Apes in 2014 and War for the Planet of the Apes in 2017. In 2019, further sequels to the 2011 reboot series entered production, with Kingdom of the Planet of the Apes released in 2024. Franchise tie-ins include books, comics, video games and toys.

Planet of the Apes is the longest-running American science-fiction film series and has grossed a total of over US$2 billion worldwide, against a combined budget of $567.5 million. It has received particular attention among film critics for its treatment of racial issues. Cinema and cultural analysts have also explored its Cold War and animal rights themes. The series has influenced subsequent media, as well as popular culture and political discourse.

== Films ==
Number	Title	Release date	Director	Screenwriters	Continuity
1	Planet of the Apes	April 3, 1968	Franklin J. Schaffner	Michael Wilson & Rod Serling	Original series
2	Beneath the Planet of the Apes	May 27, 1970	Ted Post	Paul Dehn	Original series
3	Escape from the Planet of the Apes	May 21, 1971	Don Taylor	Paul Dehn	Original series
4	Conquest of the Planet of the Apes	June 29, 1972	J. Lee Thompson	Paul Dehn	Original series
5	Battle for the Planet of the Apes	June 15, 1973	J. Lee Thompson	John William Corrington & Joyce Hooper Corrington	Original series
6	Planet of the Apes	July 27, 2001	Tim Burton	William Broyles Jr., Lawrence Konner & Mark Rosenthal	Remake
7	Rise of the Planet of the Apes	August 5, 2011	Rupert Wyatt	Rick Jaffa & Amanda Silver	Reboot series
8	Dawn of the Planet of the Apes	July 11, 2014	Matt Reeves	Mark Bomback, Rick Jaffa & Amanda Silver	Reboot series
9	War for the Planet of the Apes	July 14, 2017	Matt Reeves	Mark Bomback & Matt Reeves	Reboot series
10	Kingdom of the Planet of the Apes	May 10, 2024	Wes Ball	Josh Friedman	Reboot series
11	Untitled Planet of the Apes Film	TBA	Matt Shakman	Josh Friedman	Reboot series

== La Planète des singes ==
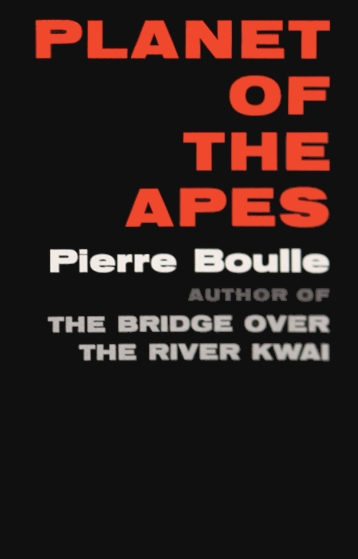
First American edition of Boulle's novel, titled Planet of the Apes

The series began with French author Pierre Boulle's 1963 novel La Planète des singes. Boulle wrote the novel in six months after the "humanlike expressions" of gorillas at the zoo inspired him to contemplate the relationship between man and ape. La Planète des singes was heavily influenced by 18th- and 19th-century fantastical travel narratives, especially Jonathan Swift's satirical Gulliver's Travels. It is one of several of Boulle's works to use science fiction tropes and plot devices to comment on the failings of human nature and mankind's overreliance on technology, though Boulle rejected the science fiction label, instead terming his genre "social fantasy".

The novel is a satire that follows French journalist Ulysse Mérou, who participates in a voyage to a distant planet where speechless, animalistic humans are hunted and enslaved by an advanced society of apes. The ape species are sorted into classes: the gorillas are police officers, the chimpanzees are scientists, and the orangutans are politicians. Eventually, Mérou discovers that humans once dominated the planet until their complacency allowed the more industrious apes to overthrow them. The story's central message is that human intelligence is not a fixed quality and could atrophy if taken for granted. Boulle considered the novel one of his minor works, though it proved to be a bestseller. British author Xan Fielding translated it into English; it was published in the United Kingdom as Monkey Planet and in the United States as Planet of the Apes.

== Original film series ==
Boulle's literary agent, Allain Bernheim, brought the novel to the attention of American film producer Arthur P. Jacobs, who had come to Paris looking for properties to adapt with his new company, APJAC Productions. To explain his interests, Jacobs would tell agents, "I wish King Kong hadn't been made so I could make it." Bernheim initially approached him about a Françoise Sagan novel, which Jacobs turned down. Remembering Jacobs's earlier comment about King Kong, Bernheim mentioned La Planète des singes, not expecting he would be interested. However, the story intrigued Jacobs, who bought the film rights immediately.

=== Planet of the Apes (1968) ===
After optioning the novel's film rights, Jacobs spent over three years trying to persuade filmmakers to take on the project. He engaged a succession of artists to create test sketches and hired veteran television writer Rod Serling, creator of The Twilight Zone, to pen the screenplay. Serling's script changed elements of Boulle's novel, introducing Cold War themes; he devised a new twist ending that revealed the planet to be a future Earth where humans had destroyed themselves through nuclear warfare. Production costs were estimated at over $10 million, a risk no studio in either Hollywood or Europe would assume. Jacobs and associate producer Mort Abrahams persevered and eventually persuaded Charlton Heston to star; Heston in turn recommended director Franklin J. Schaffner. The team recorded a brief screen test featuring Heston, which ultimately convinced 20th Century Fox the film could succeed.

Fox insisted on changes to reduce the budget to a more manageable $5.81 million. The producers hired veteran writer Michael Wilson, who had previously adapted Boulle's novel The Bridge over the River Kwai, to rewrite Serling's script. To save on special effects costs, Wilson's script described an ape society more primitive than that which appeared in the novel. The new version changed much of the plot and dialogue but retained the Cold War themes and Serling's ending. John Chambers created the makeup effects.

Heston played 20th-century American astronaut George Taylor, who travels to a strange planet where intelligent apes dominate mute, primitive humans. Kim Hunter and Roddy McDowall played the sympathetic chimpanzees Zira and Cornelius, and Linda Harrison portrayed Taylor's love interest, Nova. Maurice Evans played the villain, orangutan Minister of Science Dr. Zaius. The finale, in which Taylor comes upon a ruined Statue of Liberty and realizes he has been on Earth all along, became the defining scene of the series and one of the most iconic images in 1960s film. Planet of the Apes was released on February 8, 1968, and was a smash success with both critics and audiences. It was one of the year's 10 biggest money-makers in North America, taking in an estimated $22 million (nearly four times its budget) and earned rave reviews. John Chambers received an honorary Oscar at the 41st Academy Awards for his make-up effects, the first ever given to a make-up artist. Jerry Goldsmith's score and Morton Haack's costume design also earned Oscar nominations. Fox approached Jacobs and Abrahams about filming a sequel. Though they had not made the film with sequels in mind, its success led them to consider the prospect.

=== Beneath the Planet of the Apes (1970) ===
Planning for the sequel, eventually titled Beneath the Planet of the Apes, began two months after the original film's release. Jacobs and Abrahams considered several treatments by Serling and Boulle, eventually rejecting them. In late 1968, the producers hired Paul Dehn to write the script; he would become the primary writer for the franchise. Charlton Heston was uninterested in a sequel but agreed to shoot a few scenes if his character was killed off and his salary was donated to charity. In one of many major rewrites, Dehn altered the script to center on a new character, Brent, played by James Franciscus. With Schaffner unavailable, owing to his work on Patton, the producers hired Ted Post as director on January 8, 1969. Post struggled with the material, especially after the studio cut the budget to $3.4 million.

The story follows Franciscus's character, an astronaut who, while searching for Taylor, inadvertently follows him into the future. After encountering the apes from the first film, Brent finds Taylor imprisoned by a colony of subterranean human mutants who worship an ancient nuclear bomb. Kim Hunter, Maurice Evans and Linda Harrison returned as Zira, Zaius and Nova. David Watson replaced Roddy McDowall as Cornelius, as McDowall was unavailable due to a scheduling conflict. James Gregory played gorilla General Ursus and Paul Richards played mutant leader Méndez. The film opened on May 26, 1970. Unlike its predecessor, Beneath was poorly reviewed; critics typically regard it as the worst of the Apes sequels other than the last one, Battle for the Planet of the Apes. Nonetheless, it was a major box office hit, nearing the original's numbers. Despite a conclusion depicting the planet's nuclear destruction, Fox requested another sequel, creating a series.

=== Escape from the Planet of the Apes (1971) ===
Following the financial success of Beneath, Arthur P. Jacobs recruited Paul Dehn to write a new script with a brief telegram: "Apes exist, sequel required." Dehn immediately started work on what became Escape from the Planet of the Apes. The producers hired a new director, Don Taylor. Fox gave the production a greatly diminished budget of $2.5 million, which required a tight production schedule.

To work around the budget, as well as Beneath's seemingly definitive ending, the film took the series in a new direction by transporting Zira (Kim Hunter) and Cornelius (Roddy McDowall, returning to the role after being absent from Beneath) back in time to the contemporary United States, reducing the need for expensive sets and ape makeup effects. In the film, Zira and Cornelius are initially accepted by American society, but the humans' fears that their child will bring about the domination of the human race by evolved apes leads to conflict. Jacobs's wife, Natalie Trundy, who appeared as a mutant in Beneath and would play the ape Lisa in the next two sequels, was cast as Dr. Stephanie Branton. Bradford Dillman played Dr. Lewis Dixon, Ricardo Montalbán played Armando and Eric Braeden portrayed the villain, the president's science advisor Otto Hasslein.

Compared to its predecessors, Escape dwelt more heavily on themes of racial conflict, which became a primary focus through the rest of the series. The film opened on May 21, 1971, less than a year after Beneath. It was well received by critics. From this point critics began seeing the films less as independent units and more as installments in a greater work; Cinefantastique editor Frederick S. Clarke wrote that the burgeoning series had "the promise of being the first epic of filmed science fiction." It also performed well at the box office, though not as strongly as its predecessors. Fox ordered a third sequel.

=== Conquest of the Planet of the Apes (1972) ===
Based on the strong positive response to Escape, Fox ordered Conquest of the Planet of the Apes, though it provided a comparatively low budget of $1.7 million. Paul Dehn returned as the scriptwriter, and producer Jacobs hired J. Lee Thompson to direct. Thompson had worked with Jacobs on two earlier films as well as during the initial stages of Planet, but scheduling conflicts had made him unavailable during its long development process. For Conquest, Thompson and Dehn focused heavily on the racial conflict theme, an ancillary concern in the early films that became a central focus in Escape. In particular, Dehn associated the apes with African-Americans and modeled the plot after the 1965 Watts riots and other episodes from the Civil Rights Movement. Roddy McDowall signed on to play Caesar, the son of his previous character Cornelius. Ricardo Montalban returned as Armando, while Don Murray played Governor Breck, Severn Darden played Kolp and Hari Rhodes played MacDonald.

Following Escape, Conquest is set in a near future where humans have turned apes into slaves; Caesar rises from bondage to lead an ape rebellion. The film opened on June 30, 1972. Reviews were mixed, but the ending left the series open to another sequel and Conquest was successful enough at the box office that Fox commissioned another film.

=== Battle for the Planet of the Apes (1973) ===
Fox approved Battle for the Planet of the Apes with a $1.2 million budget, the lowest of the series. The filmmakers went into the project knowing that it would be the end of the series. J. Lee Thompson returned as director. Series writer Paul Dehn submitted a treatment, but illness forced him to leave the film before completing the script. The producers subsequently hired John William Corrington and Joyce Hooper Corrington to write the screenplay. Battle continued Conquest's focus on racial conflict and domination but, likely based in part on the studio's wishes, the Corringtons discarded Dehn's pessimistic treatment in favor of a story with a more hopeful, though ambiguous, resolution.

Battle follows Caesar as he leads the apes and their human subjects after a devastating war that destroyed much of the planet. He contends with both an attack by radiation-scarred human mutants and a coup attempt as he attempts to build a better society for both apes and humans. McDowall returned as Caesar and Severn Darden returned as Kolp. Paul Williams played the orangutan Virgil, Austin Stoker played MacDonald (the brother of Hari Rhodes' character) and Claude Akins played the gorilla general Aldo. John Huston played the orangutan Lawgiver in a frame narrative. The film opened on May 2, 1973. It made a profit over production costs, but received poor reviews from critics, who regard it as the weakest of the five films.

Critics have offered various interpretations of the film's message and its significance for the series. Particular attention has been paid to the ambiguous imagery in the ending: set over 700 years after the main events, the last scene depicts a statue of Caesar shedding a single tear as the Lawgiver recounts Caesar's story to an integrated audience of ape and human children. By one interpretation, the statue cries tears of joy because the species have broken the cycle of oppression, giving the series an optimistic finale. By another, the statue weeps because racial strife still exists, implying the dystopian future of Planet and Beneath is unavoidable.

== Television and web series ==
Series	Season	Episodes	Originally released		
Series	Season	Episodes	First released	Last released	Network
Planet of the Apes	1	14	September 13, 1974	December 20, 1974	CBS
Return to the Planet of the Apes	1	13	September 6, 1975	November 29, 1975	NBC
Before the Dawn of the Apes	1	3	July 1, 2014		YouTube

=== Planet of the Apes TV series ===
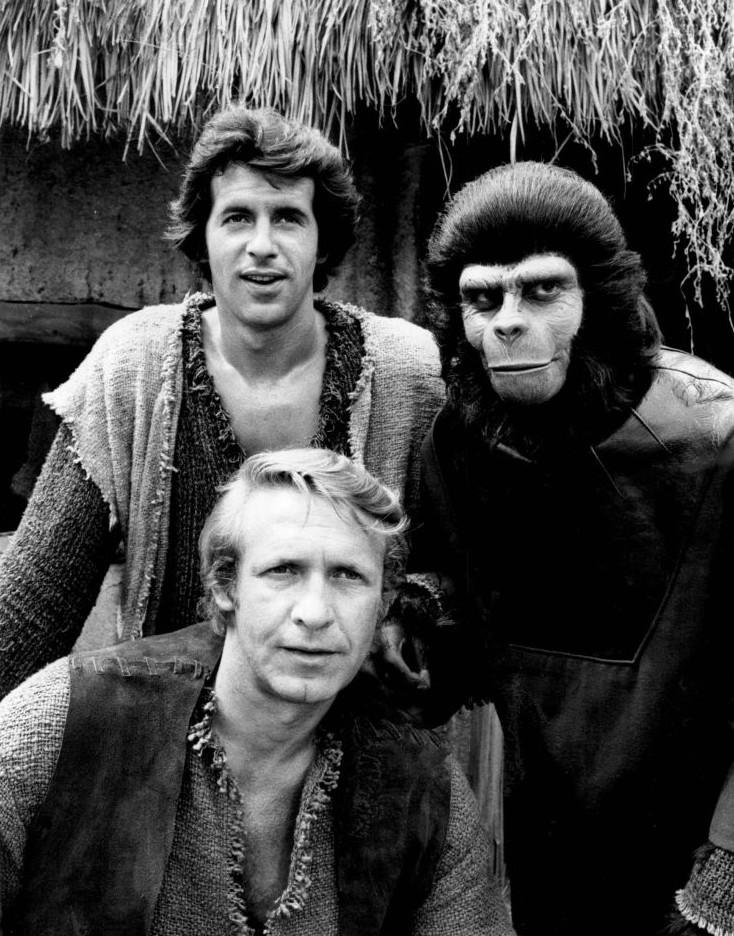
The lead cast of the Planet of the Apes television series: James Naughton as Burke, Ron Harper as Virdon and Roddy McDowall as Galen

As well as their profitable returns at the box office, the films earned very high ratings on television after their theatrical runs. To capitalize on this success, Arthur P. Jacobs conceived of an hour-long live-action television series to follow the films. He first had the idea in 1971 during the production of Conquest, which he then anticipated would be the final film, but he shelved the project once Fox ordered a fifth installment. Jacobs died on June 27, 1973, bringing an end to the APJAC Productions era of the Planet of the Apes franchise. Former Fox executive Stan Hough took over as producer for the television project, titled Planet of the Apes. CBS picked up the series for its 1974 autumn lineup.

Ron Harper and James Naughton played Alan Virdon and Peter Burke, two 20th-century American astronauts who pass through a time warp to a future where apes subjugate humans (unlike the original film, the humans can speak). Roddy McDowall returned to the franchise as Galen, a chimpanzee who joins the astronauts. Booth Coleman played orangutan Councillor Zaius and Mark Lenard played gorilla General Urko. The episodes portray Virdon, Burke, and Galen as they search for a way home, aid downtrodden humans and apes and avoid the authorities. The show premiered on September 13, 1974, filling CBS's 8–9 pm time slot on Fridays. It earned low ratings during its run, a fact the production team attributed to repetitive storytelling and too little screen time for the apes who made the franchise famous. Given the considerable production costs, CBS canceled the show after 14 episodes, the last airing on December 20, 1974.

In 1981, Fox reedited 10 of the episodes into five television films. Each film combined two episodes and (in some markets) added new introductory and concluding segments starring McDowall as an aged Galen. The films were given what scholar Eric Greene calls "the most outlandish titles of the Apes corpus": Back to the Planet of the Apes; Forgotten City of the Planet of the Apes; Treachery and Greed on the Planet of the Apes; Life, Liberty and Pursuit on the Planet of the Apes; and Farewell to the Planet of the Apes.

Greene finds the show's position in the Apes timeline significant: set in 3085, it occurs about 900 years before Taylor's crash in the original film and 400 years after the Lawgiver's sermon in Battle. By depicting a future where apes dominate humans, it implies the Lawgiver's message of equality between man and ape has failed, giving weight to the more pessimistic interpretation of Battle's ending. Greene argues that the show emphasized the theme of racial conflict less than the films had, though the episodes "The Trap" and "The Liberator" made it a central focus.

=== Return to the Planet of the Apes animated series ===
In 1975, after the failure of the live-action television series, NBC and 20th Century Fox agreed to adapt Planet of the Apes for an animated series. The network contracted DePatie-Freleng Enterprises to produce a half-hour Saturday-morning cartoon titled Return to the Planet of the Apes. Doug Wildey, co-creator of Jonny Quest, took on most creative control as associate producer, storyboard director and supervising director. Wildey had only watched the original film and Beneath and thus based his interpretation on them. As such, the show relied less on the themes and plot developments from Escape, Conquest, and Battle and instead returned to the Vietnam War and Cold War themes prominent in the first two films.

The plot concerns three American astronauts, Bill Hudson (Tom Williams), Jeff Allen (Austin Stoker, who played MacDonald in Battle) and Judy Franklin (Claudette Nevins), who inadvertently journey to Earth's far future. They find the world populated by three groups: mute humans who inhabit desert caves, subterranean human "Underdwellers" fashioned after the mutants of Beneath and civilized apes who subjugate the humans. Through the show, the astronauts become increasingly involved in the planet's affairs and in defending the humans against an ape invasion. The cast featured characters based on those from the previous films and TV series, including Nova (Nevins again), General Urko (Henry Cordin), Zira (Philippa Harris), Cornelius (Edwin Mills) and Dr. Zaius (Richard Blackburn). NBC broadcast 13 episodes between September 6 and November 29, 1975. The show did not achieve particularly strong ratings. The network considered producing a second three-episode season to complete the storyline, but this never materialized.

=== Before the Dawn of the Apes web-series ===
Before the Dawn of the Apes is a three-part YouTube mini-series released in July 1, 2014 that takes place between the 10 year time span from Rise of the Planet of the Apes to Dawn of the Planet of the Apes, created in promotion of the latter.

== Remake film ==
=== Planned relaunch and development hell ===
Fox initiated plans to relaunch the Planet of the Apes series in the 1980s, but the project fell into a drawn-out and fruitless development phase—"development hell"—for over 10 years, one of the most protracted development periods in film history. It began in 1988, when Fox announced that Adam Rifkin, then a 21-year-old independent film director, would develop a new Apes movie. At a Fox executive's invitation, Rifkin pitched a concept for Return to the Planet of the Apes, an alternative sequel to Planet that ignored the other four films. In Rifkin's initial concept, Taylor's descendant Duke launches a Spartacus-like uprising against Roman-inspired ape oppressors led by General Izan. Days before the project was scheduled to enter pre-production, Fox brought in new studio executives, who sent it back to development. They commissioned Rifkin to write several redrafts, but found them unsatisfactory and ultimately scrapped the project.

After several years in limbo, Fox returned to the Apes concept, this time with Oliver Stone as a producer. Stone brought in Terry Hayes as screenwriter and they developed a script titled Return of the Apes. In their script, humanity is threatened by an ailment encoded in their DNA, so two scientists go back in time thousands of years to stop it at its origin. They discover the disease was engineered by advanced apes to ensure humanity's eventual destruction. Arnold Schwarzenegger committed to star as scientist Will Robinson and Phillip Noyce agreed to direct. The draft impressed Fox president Peter Chernin, but other executives were ambivalent about the action script, believing that it should be lighter. At one point, executive Dylan Sellers insisted the script include a comic scene involving apes playing baseball as his "stamp" on the film and fired Hayes when he left it out. This move caused Noyce to quit as well and subsequently, almost everyone involved in the project left for one reason or another.

After the collapse of the Stone-Hayes project, Fox brought on Chris Columbus to develop a new Apes concept. Columbus hired Sam Hamm to write a screenplay taking elements from Boulle's novel and various unused treatments. In Hamm's script, an ape astronaut from a distant planet unleashes a devastating virus on Earth. Scientists go to the astronaut's planet, where apes hunt humans; they locate a cure but return to find Earth overrun by the apes. Schwarzenegger remained attached, but Fox found the script underwhelming. Columbus left the project in 1995 after his mother's death and James Cameron stepped in to produce. Cameron intended to go in a "very different direction" with the script, but following the critical and financial success of his film Titanic, he dropped out of the project. Fox approached a series of directors to take over, without success.

=== Planet of the Apes (2001) ===
In 1999, Fox hired William Broyles, Jr. to write a new script. Fox insisted on a July 2001 release date but otherwise offered Broyles considerable creative license. This prospect attracted director Tim Burton, who hoped to do a "re-imagining" of Planet of the Apes. Burton found the production arduous, largely due to Fox's strict release schedule. The studio budgeted the film at $100 million, meaning Broyles' ambitious script had to be altered to reduce costs; Lawrence Konner and Mark Rosenthal worked on rewrites even as the film entered production. The tight schedule meant that all stages of production were rushed.

The film stars Mark Wahlberg as astronaut Leo Davidson, who accidentally travels through a wormhole to a distant planet where talking apes enslave humans. He leads a human revolt and upends ape civilization by discovering that the apes evolved from the normal apes who had accompanied his mission and had arrived on the planet years before. Helena Bonham Carter played chimpanzee Ari, while Tim Roth played the human-hating chimpanzee General Thade. The film received mixed reviews; most critics believed it failed to compare to the original. Much of the negative commentary focused on the confusing plot and twist ending, though many reviewers praised the special effects. The film succeeded at the box office, taking in $362 million worldwide. Fox had initially hoped for a sequel, but the difficult production left Burton unenthusiastic about participating, and the film failed to generate enough interest for the studio to pursue a follow-up.

== Reboot film series ==
=== Rise of the Planet of the Apes (2011) ===
In 2005, screenwriters Rick Jaffa and Amanda Silver developed a concept for a new Planet of the Apes film, eventually titled Rise of the Planet of the Apes. Inspired by news articles on apes raised as humans and advances in genetics, Jaffa conceived an idea for a film about a genetically enhanced chimpanzee raised in a human household. He and Silver pitched the concept to Fox as a way to reboot the Apes franchise by reinventing the story of the chimpanzee Caesar, the lead character of Conquest and Battle. Fox was impressed and bought the pitch, but development struggled for five years as the production cycled through scripts, writers, directors and producers. In 2010, producers Chernin and Dylan Clark of Chernin Entertainment stepped in to move the film forward, retaining Jaffa and Silver as writers.

In the final script, Caesar receives enhanced cognition in utero from an experimental drug administered to his mother and is then raised by Will Rodman, the creator of the drug. After a physical altercation with a neighbor, a court ordered that Caesar be turned over to an ape sanctuary. Here, Caesar uses his ingenuity to launch an uprising. The screenplay contains complex connections to other entries in the series, causing some confusion as to its exact relation to them. Oliver Lindler writes that while the film's premise might identify it as a remake of Conquest, official dispatches and professional reviewers typically avoided the term, instead calling the film a prequel or "origin story" to the original Planet of the Apes film and/or a reboot of the series; fans and bloggers were more likely to refer to it as a "remake". The completed script attracted director Rupert Wyatt. To portray ape characters realistically, the production avoided practical effects in favor of motion-capture acting, partnering with New Zealand visual effects company Weta Digital. Wyatt cast James Franco as Will Rodman, while veteran performance-capture actor Andy Serkis signed on to star as Caesar.

Rise debuted on August 5, 2011. Critics reviewed it positively, especially praising the visual effects and Serkis's performance. It was a major box office hit, taking in $482 million globally, more than five times its $93 million budget. Weta's special effects earned the film two Visual Effects Society Awards and an Oscar nomination at the 84th Academy Awards, among other accolades. The strength of Serkis's performance also inspired Fox to promote him for Oscar consideration; he was not nominated by Academy voters. Following the movie's success, Fox immediately planned for a sequel.

=== Dawn of the Planet of the Apes (2014) ===
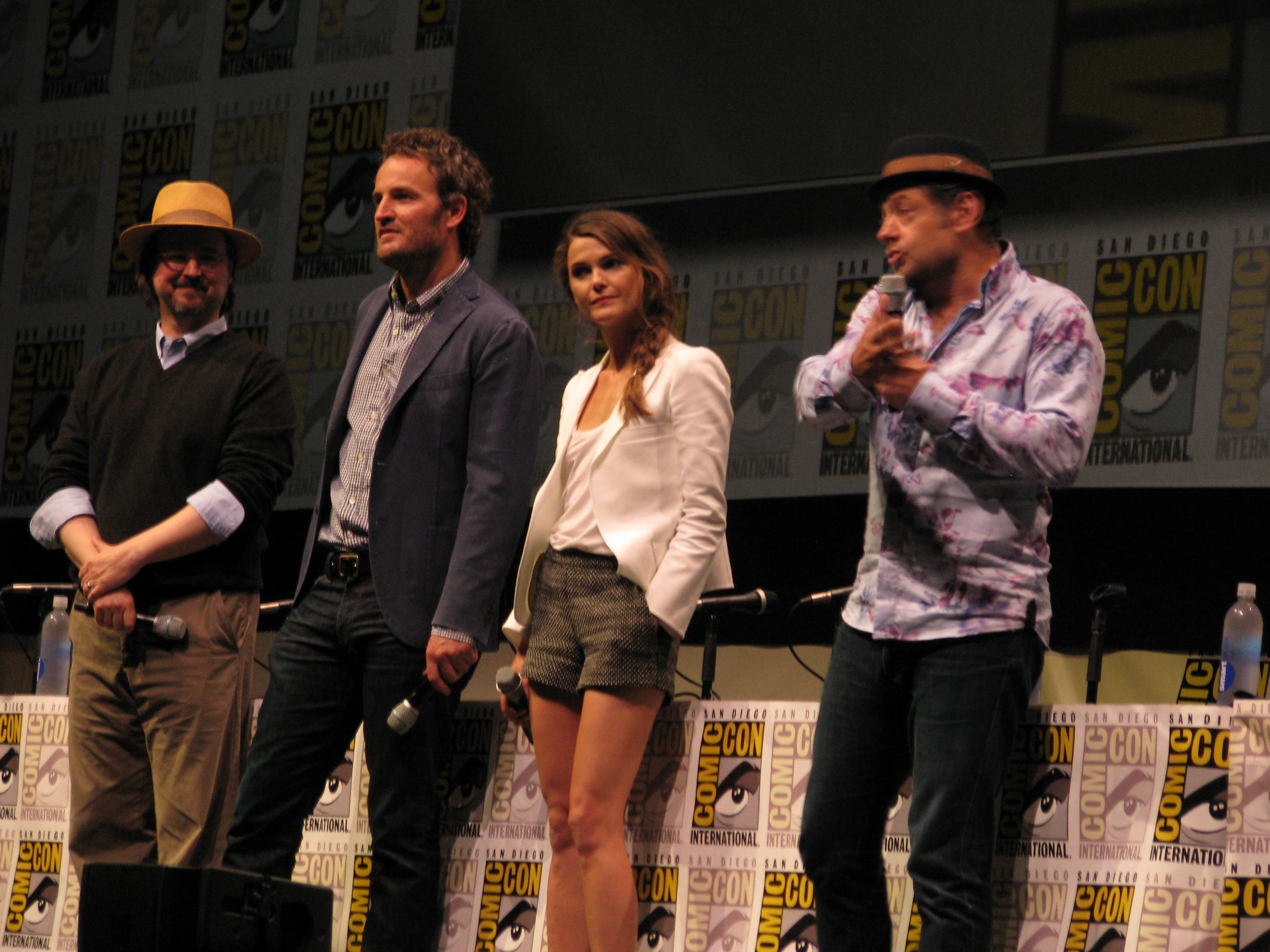
Director and cast of Dawn of the Planet of the Apes (from left): Matt Reeves and stars Jason Clarke, Keri Russell, and Andy Serkis

Producers Peter Chernin and Dylan Clark started planning the film eventually titled Dawn of the Planet of the Apes just after Rise's release in 2011. Fox allocated a budget of $40 million, although the ultimate budget increased to $170 million. Rick Jaffa and Amanda Silver returned to pen the script and produce and the studio quickly signed Andy Serkis to reprise his role as Caesar. Director Rupert Wyatt withdrew from the project due to production and scheduling issues and was replaced by Matt Reeves.

Set 10 years after Rise, the film establishes that the Simian Flu, a side effect of the drug that enhanced the apes' intelligence, has killed most humans. Caesar struggles to maintain peace as his ape community is drawn into violent clashes with nearby human survivors. Weta Digital again provided special effects work, which combined practical sets, digitally manipulated backgrounds and performance capture ape characters. The lead human characters were played by Jason Clarke, as Malcolm; Keri Russell, as Ellie; and Gary Oldman, as Dreyfus. Released on July 11, 2014, the film was very well received by critics, who found it a strong follow-up to Rise and lauded the combination of an engaging script with impressive special effects. It also performed very strongly at the box office, taking in $711 million in worldwide grosses. Its special effects received several honors, including three Visual Effects Society Awards and an Oscar nomination at the 87th Academy Awards.

=== War for the Planet of the Apes (2017) ===
Fox was confident enough in Dawn of the Planet of the Apes that the studio started planning for the next installment months before the film debuted. After Fox and Chernin Entertainment screened Matt Reeves' cut of Dawn, he was contracted to return as director; he also wrote the script with Mark Bomback. Peter Chernin, Dylan Clark, Rick Jaffa and Amanda Silver again served as producers. Given a $150 million budget, War for the Planet of the Apes was released on July 14, 2017.

Set 2 years after Dawn, the film depicts the apes and humans in armed conflict and follows Caesar and his followers as they track down the mysterious Colonel, a human paramilitary leader, and search for a new home. Serkis returned as Caesar, Woody Harrelson played the villainous Colonel and Steve Zahn played Bad Ape. It earned widespread critical acclaim; reviewers praised the effects and narrative and found the film a fitting conclusion to Caesar's story. It earned $491 million at the worldwide box office.

It received numerous awards and nominations, including nominations for Best Visual Effects and Best Special Visual Effects at the 90th Academy Awards and 71st British Academy Film Awards, respectively.

=== Kingdom of the Planet of the Apes (2024) ===
In October 2016, it was reported that a fourth film in the new series was being discussed. Shortly before the release of War in July 2017, Reeves said that he expressed interest in making more Apes films and that Steve Zahn, who played Bad Ape in the film, had set up a story for further sequels. Writer Mark Bomback hinted that further films would be possible. In April 2019, following the acquisition of 21st Century Fox by Disney, Walt Disney Studios announced that future Planet of the Apes films were in development. In August 2019, Disney stated that any future installments would take place in the universe first established in Rise of the Planet of the Apes. In February 2020, Wes Ball was announced as director of the next film, with Joe Hartwick Jr. and David Starke serving as producers. Ball explained that the story will take place after the events of War for the Planet of the Apes, and continue to follow "Caesar's legacy". In May 2020, it was announced that Josh Friedman will serve as screenwriter alongside Ball, while Rick Jaffa and Amanda Silver will return to the franchise as producers. In an interview with The Hollywood Reporter, 20th Century Studios president Steve Asbell stated that production would start between the late summer or early fall of 2022. In August 2022, Owen Teague was announced to have been cast in a lead role, Noa. In September 2022, Freya Allan and Peter Macon were announced to have been cast and the title was revealed to be Kingdom of the Planet of the Apes. Production for the film began in October 2022 in Sydney, New South Wales at Disney Studios Australia.

300 years after the events of War, ape civilizations have emerged from the oasis to which Caesar led his fellow apes, while humans have regressed into a feral, primitive state. When the ape king Proximus Caesar, armed with weapons forged from lost human technology, preaches Caesar's teachings to enslave other clans, the young chimpanzee hunter Noa embarks on a harrowing journey alongside a human woman named Mae to determine the future for apes and humans alike. Released on May 10, 2024, the film received positive reviews, with praise for its action sequences, visual effects, and performances of the cast. It has earned $392 million at the worldwide box office.

=== Untitled Kingdom of the Planet of the Apes sequel (2027) ===
Asbell announced that a sequel to Kingdom of the Planet of the Apes is in development. It is planned to be released on May 14, 2027. In May 2026, it was reported a new film unrelated to the previous film will be directed by Matt Shakman and written by Josh Friedman.

== Other media and merchandise ==
=== Books ===
Pierre Boulle's novel La Planète des singes was translated and reprinted several times after its original publication in 1963. All four of the original series' sequels spawned novelizations by established science fiction writers of the day, each of which went through multiple reprints of their own. Michael Avallone wrote the novelization for Beneath the Planet of the Apes in 1970. Jerry Pournelle, who later co-authored Lucifer's Hammer and The Mote in God's Eye, wrote the Escape from the Planet of the Apes novelization in 1974. John Jakes, former Science Fiction Writers of America president, wrote the Conquest of the Planet of the Apes novelization in 1972. David Gerrold, scriptwriter for the Star Trek episode "The Trouble with Tribbles", wrote the Battle for the Planet of the Apes novelization in 1973. Novelizations of the live action and animated television series were also produced. William T. Quick wrote the 2001 Planet of the Apes novelization; he also wrote two prequel novels (Planet of the Apes: The Fall (2002) and Planet of the Apes: Colony (2003)), and several other book tie-ins were published.

American science-fiction writer Alec Effinger wrote four books based on the live action television series. Man the Fugitive contains the episodes The Good Seeds and The Cure, Escape to Tomorrow contains the episodes The Surgeon and The Deception, Journey into Terror contains the episodes The Horse Race and The Legacy, and Lord of the Apes contains the episodes The Gladiators and The Tyrant. All were published by Award Books in 1974.

The 2011 reboot series also inspired several tie-in novels, including Firestorm and Revelations by Greg Keyes.

=== Comics ===
Planet of the Apes–based comics have been published regularly since 1968. Among the most notable is Marvel Comics' Planet of the Apes magazine, published from 1974 to 1977. The black-and-white series featured adaptations of each of the films, new Apes stories by Doug Moench, series news, essays, interviews, and other material. It became one of Marvel's most successful titles, attracting 300 to 400 fan letters with every issue, so many that the studio had to suspend its practice of writing personal responses. Marvel also published the monthly title Adventures on the Planet of the Apes from 1975 to 1976, comprising color reprints of the Planet and Beneath adaptations.

In 1991, during a resurgence of interest in the franchise, Malibu Comics launched a new monthly black-and-white Planet of the Apes comic through its Adventure Comics studio. The debut issue sold 40,000 copies, a record for black-and-white comics, leading to a successful run of 24 issues over two years. The series follows Caesar's grandson and heir Alexander as he struggles to govern ape civilization. The comic's success led Malibu to publish five four-issue spinoff miniseries: Ape City, Planet of the Apes: Urchak's Folly, the Alien Nation crossover Ape Nation, Planet of the Apes: Blood of the Apes and Planet of the Apes: The Forbidden Zone. Malibu also published two one-shot comics, A Day on the Planet of the Apes and Planet of the Apes: Sins of the Fathers, a prequel story to the original film; a trade paperback collecting the first four issues of the main series, titled Monkey Planet; and reissues of stories from Marvel's earlier Apes series.

Gold Key Comics, Dark Horse Comics, and Boom! Studios have also produced Planet of the Apes comic books. The Boom! releases include crossovers with other properties: 2014's Star Trek/Planet of the Apes: The Primate Directive and 2017's King Kong story Kong on the Planet of the Apes. In 2018, Boom! released a graphic novel, Planet of the Apes: Visionaries, adapted by Dana Gould and Chad Lewis from the original 1968 film's unused screenplay by Rod Serling.

=== Toys and merchandise ===
The series, and particularly the live-action Apes television show and the Return to the Planet of the Apes cartoon, generated numerous toy and merchandising tie-ins. During the 1970s, Fox licensed around 60 companies to produce about 300 different Apes products, including action figures and playsets, model building kits, coloring books, book-and-record sets, trading cards, toy weapons, costumes, apparel, branded tableware, and lunch boxes. This level of merchandising was unusual for the time and the success of Apes merchandise may have inspired the campaigns that later became commonplace for films and television series. The action figures, sold by Mego beginning in 1973, were the first such toys sold as film tie-ins; they proved popular and inspired the rise of action figure series based on popular culture franchises. Eric Greene writes that Apes toys were popular enough to lead some contemporary children to engage in apes-vs.-humans role-playing make believe games that simulated the series' conflicts in a manner similar to "Cowboys and Indians". With the release of the 21st-century films, Fox licensed several companies to manufacture new Apes toys, including detailed action figures of new and "classic" characters sold as collectibles.

=== Video games ===
In 1983, 20th Century Fox Videogames developed a Planet of the Apes game for the Atari 2600, which was to be the first computer game based on the series. The game was still in the prototype phase when Fox shuttered its game division during the video game crash of 1983 and it never saw release. It was assumed lost until 2002, when collectors identified a prototype, found earlier in a case labeled Alligator People, as the missing Apes game. Independent designers Retrodesign completed and released the game as Revenge of the Apes in 2003. In the game, the player controls Taylor as he fights apes across several levels inspired by the film to reach the Statue of Liberty.

A video game based on the series did not appear until 2001. Fox Interactive began developing a Planet of the Apes game in 1998 for PC and PlayStation as a tie-in to the long-gestating remake project. Fox and developer Visiware proceeded with the game when the project went into limbo, creating their own story based on Boulle's novel and the original films. The game is an action-adventure in which players control astronaut Ulysses as he explores an ape-ruled future Earth. Fox Interactive's decision to co-publish with another company, Ubisoft, further delayed the game's release. Despite its long development, the game missed the debut of Tim Burton's Planet of the Apes film by two months; it finally appeared on September 20, 2001, to mostly negative reviews. Additionally, Ubisoft produced a substantially different Planet of the Apes game for Game Boy Advance and Game Boy Color, a side-scroller following the first two films.

In 2014, Fox partnered with Ndemic Creations on a substantial Dawn of the Planet of the Apes–themed update to the mobile game Plague Inc. Players create and spread a "simian flu" virus to eradicate humans while helping apes survive. In 2017, Fox commissioned an adventure game to accompany War for the Planet of the Apes called Planet of the Apes: Last Frontier. Serkis' digital effects company The Imaginarium worked on the game and Serkis performed motion capture. It was released on PlayStation 4 on November 21, 2017, to mixed reviews. In 2018, Fox's virtual reality division FoxNext VR Studio partnered with developers Imaginati Studios on a VR first-person shooter, Crisis on the Planet of the Apes VR. The player controls a chimpanzee attempting to escape a human detention facility. It was released on PC and PlayStation 4, receiving negative to average reviews.

== Themes and analysis ==
=== Racial issues ===
Eric Greene, author of a book on the role of race in the original films and spinoff material, writes that "when seen as one epic work, the Apes saga emerges as a liberal allegory of racial conflict." In Greene's interpretation, the franchise's plot arc is rooted in the central conflict in which humans and apes alternately subjugate one another in a destructive cycle. Difference between human and ape manifests primarily in physical appearance, and dominance derives from social power rather than innate superiority. Each film shifts the power balance so that the audience identifies sometimes with the humans and at other times with the apes. According to Greene, this arc's central message is that unresolved racial discord inevitably leads to cataclysm. Other critics have adopted or echoed Greene's interpretation.

Producers Abrahams and Jacobs did not consciously intend the first film's racial undertones and did not appreciate them until Sammy Davis Jr. pointed them out in 1968. Subsequently, the filmmakers incorporated the theme more overtly in later installments; as a result, race moves from being a secondary motif in the first two films to becoming the major concern of the last three.

Several critics have written that the reboot films downplay this theme from the original series, removing the racial subtext of conflict between humans and apes. These critics generally argue that this is to the films' detriment, writing that it softens the series' edge, leaves it thematically shallow, and marginalizes non-white characters; several critics have written that the films appear to invoke a "post-racial America", rather than exploring issues of race. Others write that the films incorporate racial themes in subtler ways, but that their presentation oversimplifies a complex message to the point of reinforcing racial norms rather than challenging them.

=== Cold War and nuclear apocalypse ===
The Cold War and the threat of nuclear holocaust are major themes introduced in Rod Serling's original Planet of the Apes script. The films are apocalyptic and dystopian, suggesting the era's tensions could well lead to world destruction. The films critique both sides of the war, with the oppressive ape society and the underground mutant city featuring traits of both Western culture and the Soviet bloc. According to Greene, Cold War motifs were central to the first two films and some spinoff media, but were less significant in the later sequels, which foregrounded racial conflict instead.

=== Animal rights ===
Questions of animal rights also figure heavily in the series; Greene considers this related to the racial themes. The first film portrays Taylor treated cruelly by apes who consider him an animal; in later films, humans abuse apes for the same reason. The idea of primate rights is much more dominant in the reboot films, which directly invoke the question of great ape personhood in portraying Caesar and his followers struggling for their rights in a society that does not consider them legal persons.

== Cultural impact and legacy ==
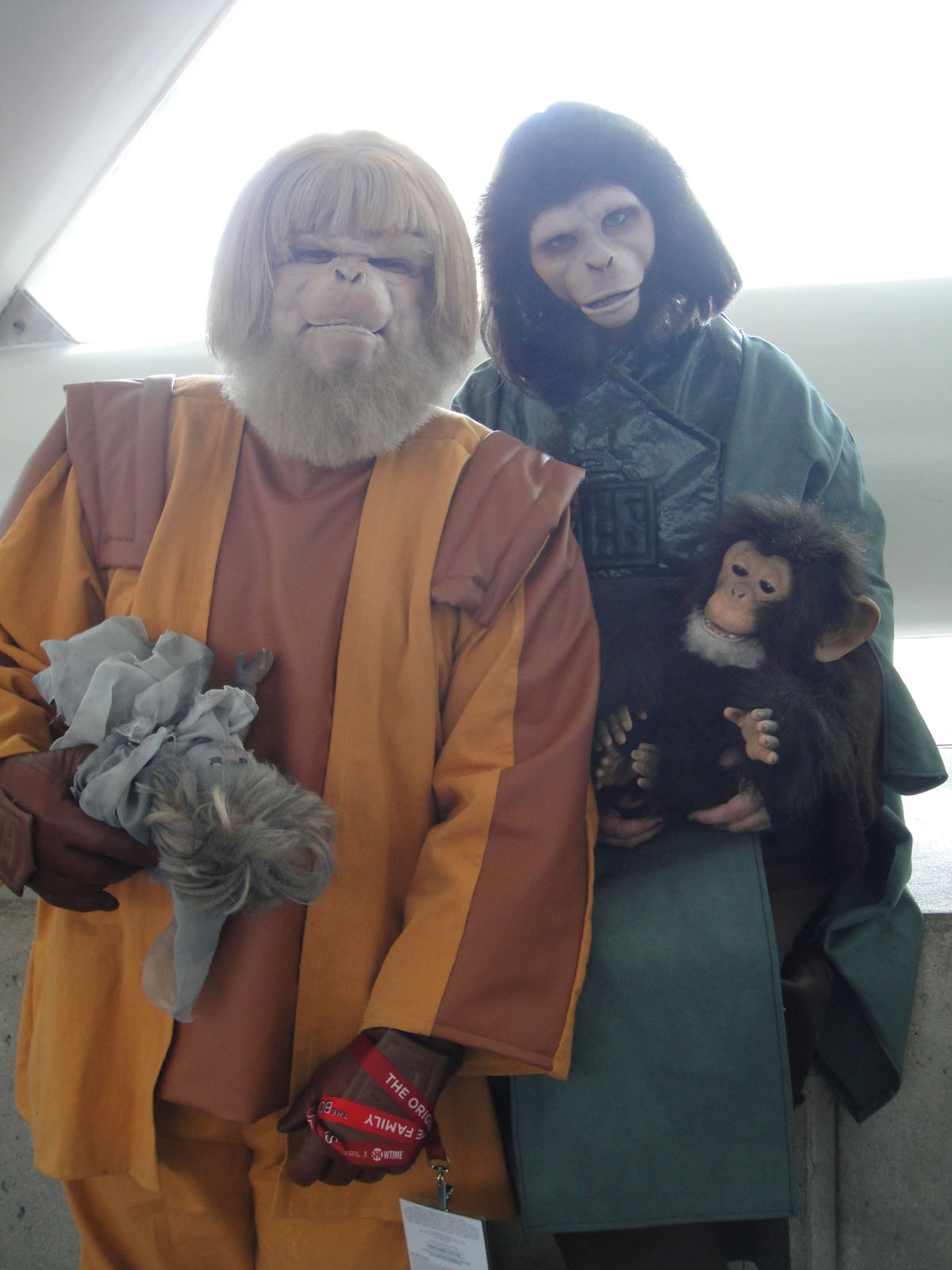
Fans in costume as Dr. Zaius and Dr. Zira at a science fiction convention

Planet of the Apes received popular and critical attention well after production ended on the original films and television series. Fans' interest in the franchise continued through publications like Marvel Comics' Planet of the Apes magazine and science fiction conventions, where the series was sufficiently popular to inspire "apecons"—conventions devoted entirely to films involving apes—in the 1970s. The series' distinctive ape costumes were employed in live appearances, including by musician Paul Williams (Virgil from Battle) on The Tonight Show Starring Johnny Carson and by Mike Douglas on The Mike Douglas Show. In the 1970s, fans Bill Blake and Paula Crist created Cornelius and Zira costumes; their routine was convincing enough that Fox licensed them to portray the characters at events. The films earned strong ratings when they aired on television after their releases and various stations rebroadcast them together in marathons in later years. The live-action television series was reformatted into five TV movies for further broadcast in 1981 and the Sci-Fi Channel ran both it and the cartoon series in the 1990s.

Planet of the Apes had a wide impact on subsequent popular media. In terms of production, the series' success with sequelization, spinoffs and merchandising established a new model of media franchising in Hollywood filmmaking, in which studios develop films specifically to generate multimedia franchises. In terms of content, the series influenced various films and television productions during the 1970s and 1980s that used science fiction settings and characters to explore race relations, including Alien Nation, Enemy Mine, and V. More direct influence can be seen in DC Comics' 1972–1978 series Kamandi: The Last Boy on Earth and the Japanese franchise Time of the Apes, which concern human protagonists in post-apocalyptic worlds ruled by talking animals. Mel Brooks' 1987 science fiction spoof Spaceballs lampooned the original Planet's Statue of Liberty ending.

Interest in the series resurged in the 1990s, as plans for a new film and other media circulated. Greene attributes this renewed interest to a combination of "pop culture nostalgia and baby boomer economics", as well as a "political ferment" rising at the time that hearkened back to the period when the films were first released. Inspired particularly by the publication of the Malibu Comics series, during this period fans founded new clubs, websites, and fanzines active in the U.S., Canada, Brazil, and other countries. Companies began producing new branded merchandise, including clothing, toys, and costumes.

Especially after the 1990s, artists in diverse media referenced, incorporated, or were otherwise influenced by the series. Planet of the Apes turned up in songs by various musicians, allusions in films, comedy bits by Dennis Miller and Paul Mooney, and an episode of Saturday Night Live hosted by Charlton Heston. The Simpsons parodied the series several times. In particular, the episode "A Fish Called Selma" features the washed-up actor Troy McClure starring in a Broadway musical adaptation called Stop the Planet of the Apes, I Want to Get Off! Artist Martha Rosler incorporated footage of Cornelius and Zira's interrogation from Escape in her installation "Global Taste: A Meal in Three Courses", while Guillermo Gómez-Peña and Coco Fusco employed video from Planet in a 1993 performance art piece at the Whitney Museum of American Art.

The series' impact has extended to the political sphere, and groups of various leanings have employed its themes and imagery in their discourse. The phrase "planet of the apes" has been used for an overturning of the political or racial status quo. Eric Greene writes that it is especially popular among racial nationalists and reactionaries of different stripes. According to Greene, white supremacists liken minority advancement to the films' world in which supposed "inferiors" seize control, while black nationalists subvert the reference to celebrate the "racial apocalypse"; in this spirit, gangsta rap group Da Lench Mob titled their 1994 album Planet of da Apes. Greene writes that these uses invert the anti-racist message of the films. Planet's final image of the ruined Statue of Liberty has become a common political reference; for example, Greenpeace used it in an advertising campaign against nuclear testing. The series' themes and imagery have been invoked in political discussions on topics as varied as 1960s culture, urban decay, contemporary wars, and gun violence.

== Reception ==
=== Box-office performance ===
Film	Release date	Box office gross			Box office ranking		Budget	Ref(s)
Film	Release date	North America	Other territories	Worldwide	All time North America	All time worldwide	Budget	Ref(s)
Planet of the Apes	February 8, 1968	$32,589,624	$9,864	$32,599,488	#2,328	—N/a	$5.8 million	
Beneath the Planet of the Apes	May 27, 1970	$18,999,718	—N/a	$18,999,718	#3,301	—N/a	$3.4 million	
Escape from the Planet of the Apes	May 21, 1971	$12,348,905	—N/a	$12,348,905	#4,089	—N/a	$2.5 million	
Conquest of the Planet of the Apes	June 14, 1972	$9,043,472	—N/a	$9,043,472	#4,555	—N/a	$1.7 million	
Battle for the Planet of the Apes	May 23, 1973	$8,844,595	—N/a	$8,844,595	#4,581	—N/a	$1.2 million	
Planet of the Apes	July 27, 2001	$180,011,740	$182,200,000	$362,211,740	#215	#282	$100 million	
Rise of the Planet of the Apes	August 5, 2011	$176,760,185	$305,040,688	$481,800,873	#235	#184	$93 million	
Dawn of the Planet of the Apes	July 11, 2014	$208,545,589	$502,098,977	$710,644,566	#167	#90	$170 million	
War for the Planet of the Apes	July 14, 2017	$146,880,162	$343,839,601	$490,719,763	#343	#185	$150 million	
Kingdom of the Planet of the Apes	May 10, 2024	$171,096,048	$226,206,820	$397,302,868	—N/a	—N/a	$160 million	
Total		$965,120,038	$1,559,338,852	$2,524,506,124			$687.6–792.6 million	

=== Critical and public response ===
Film	Rotten Tomatoes	Metacritic	CinemaScore
Planet of the Apes	86% (96 reviews)	79 (14 reviews)	—N/a
Beneath the Planet of the Apes	37% (30 reviews)	46 (9 reviews)	—N/a
Escape from the Planet of the Apes	75% (28 reviews)	69 (9 reviews)	—N/a
Conquest of the Planet of the Apes	52% (23 reviews)	49 (6 reviews)	—N/a
Battle for the Planet of the Apes	33% (27 reviews)	40 (5 reviews)	—N/a
Planet of the Apes	43% (200 reviews)	50 (34 reviews)	B−
Rise of the Planet of the Apes	82% (269 reviews)	68 (39 reviews)	A−
Dawn of the Planet of the Apes	91% (317 reviews)	79 (48 reviews)	A−
War for the Planet of the Apes	94% (362 reviews)	82 (50 reviews)	A−
Kingdom of the Planet of the Apes	80% (228 reviews)	66 (57 reviews)	B

=== Accolades ===
Title	Academy Awards		BAFTA Awards		Annie Awards		Critics Choice Awards	
Title	Nominations	Wins	Nominations	Wins	Nominations	Wins	Nominations	Wins
Planet of the Apes (1968)	2 (Note: Academy Award for Best Costume Design) (Note: Academy Award for Best Original Score)	1 (Note: Academy Honorary Award)						
Planet of the Apes (2001)			2 (Note: BAFTA Award for Best Costume Design) (Note: BAFTA Award for Best Makeup and Hair)					
Rise of the Planet of the Apes	1 (Note: Academy Award for Best Visual Effects)		1 (Note: BAFTA Award for Best Special Visual Effects)			1 (Note: Annie Award for Outstanding Achievement for Character Animation in a Live Action Production)	2 (Note: Critics' Choice Movie Award for Best Supporting Actor) (Note: Critics' Choice Movie Award for Best Action Movie)	1 (Note: Critics' Choice Movie Award for Best Visual Effects)
Dawn of the Planet of the Apes	1		1			1	1 (Note: Critics' Choice Movie Award for Best Sci-Fi/Horror Movie)	1
War for the Planet of the Apes	1		1			1	1	1
Kingdom of the Planet of the Apes	1		1			1	1	

== Cast and crew ==
=== Recurring cast and characters ===
List indicators

This section includes characters who have appeared in recurring roles in the series.

- An empty grey cell indicates the character was not in the film.
- ^{A} indicates an appearance through archival footage or audio.
- ^{C} indicates a cameo role.
- ^{S} indicates an appearance through use of special effects.
- ^{U} indicates an uncredited appearance.
- ^{V} indicates a voice-only role.

Character	Original series					Remake	Reboot series			
Character	Planet of the Apes	Beneath the Planet of the Apes	Escape from the Planet of the Apes	Conquest of the Planet of the Apes	Battle for the Planet of the Apes	Planet of the Apes	Rise of the Planet of the Apes	Dawn of the Planet of the Apes	War for the Planet of the Apes	Kingdom of the Planet of the Apes
Dr. Zira	Kim Hunter	Kim Hunter	Kim Hunter		Kim Hunter^{A}					
Dr. Cornelius	Roddy McDowall	David Watson	Roddy McDowall		Roddy McDowall^{A}					
George Taylor	Charlton Heston	Charlton Heston	Charlton Heston^{A}							
Dr. Zaius	Maurice Evans	Maurice Evans				Charlton Heston^{U}				
Nova	Linda Harrison	Linda Harrison								
Landon	Robert Gunner		Robert Gunner^{A}							
Caesar			Walker Edmiston^{V}	Roddy McDowall	Roddy McDowall		Andy Serkis	Andy Serkis	Andy Serkis	^{S}
Armando			Ricardo Montalbán	Ricardo Montalbán						
Dr. Otto Hasslein			Eric Braeden		Eric Braeden^{A}					
Kolp				Severn Darden	Severn Darden					
Lisa				Natalie Trundy	Natalie Trundy					
Cornelius II					Bobby Porter			^{S}	Devyn Dalton	^{S}
Maurice							Karin Konoval	Karin Konoval	Karin Konoval	Karin Konoval^{C}
Rocket							Terry Notary	Terry Notary	Terry Notary	Terry Notary^{C}
Cornelia							Devyn Dalton	Judy Greer	Judy Greer	
Koba							Christopher Gordon	Toby Kebbell	Toby Kebbell	
Will Rodman							James Franco	James Franco^{U}		
Blue Eyes								Nick Thurston	Max Lloyd-Jones	
Luca								Scott Lang	Michael Adamthwaite	
Lake									Sara Canning	^{S}

=== Crew ===
Crew/detail	Original series					Remake	Reboot series			
Crew/detail	Planet of the Apes	Beneath the Planet of the Apes	Escape from the Planet of the Apes	Conquest of the Planet of the Apes	Battle for the Planet of the Apes	Planet of the Apes	Rise of the Planet of the Apes	Dawn of the Planet of the Apes	War for the Planet of the Apes	Kingdom of the Planet of the Apes
Crew/detail	1968	1970	1971	1972	1973	2001	2011	2014	2017	2024
Director	Franklin J. Schaffner	Ted Post	Don Taylor	J. Lee Thompson	J. Lee Thompson	Tim Burton	Rupert Wyatt	Matt Reeves	Matt Reeves	Wes Ball
Producer(s)	Arthur P. Jacobs	Arthur P. Jacobs	Arthur P. Jacobs	Arthur P. Jacobs	Arthur P. Jacobs	Richard Zanuck	Peter Chernin, Dylan Clark, Rick Jaffa and Amanda Silver	Peter Chernin, Dylan Clark, Rick Jaffa and Amanda Silver	Peter Chernin, Dylan Clark, Rick Jaffa and Amanda Silver	Wes Ball, Joe Hartwick Jr., Rick Jaffa, Amanda Silver, Jason Reed
Story by	Michael Wilson and Rod Serling	Paul Dehn and Mort Abrahams	Paul Dehn	Paul Dehn	Paul Dehn	William Broyles Jr., Lawrence Konner and Mark Rosenthal	Rick Jaffa and Amanda Silver	Mark Bomback, Rick Jaffa and Amanda Silver	Mark Bomback and Matt Reeves	Josh Friedman
Screenwriter(s)	Michael Wilson and Rod Serling	Paul Dehn	Paul Dehn	Paul Dehn	John William Corrington and Joyce Hooper Corrington	William Broyles Jr., Lawrence Konner and Mark Rosenthal	Rick Jaffa and Amanda Silver	Mark Bomback, Rick Jaffa and Amanda Silver	Mark Bomback and Matt Reeves	Josh Friedman
Composer	Jerry Goldsmith	Leonard Rosenman	Jerry Goldsmith	Tom Scott	Leonard Rosenman	Danny Elfman	Patrick Doyle	Michael Giacchino	Michael Giacchino	John Paesano
Cinematographer	Leon Shamroy	Milton Krasner	Joseph Biroc	Bruce Surtees	Richard Kline	Philippe Rousselot	Andrew Lesnie	Michael Seresin	Michael Seresin	Gyula Pados
Editor(s)	Hugh Fowler	Marion Rothman	Marion Rothman	Alan Jaggs and Marjorie Fowler	Alan Jaggs and John Horger	Chris Lebenzon and Joel Negron	Conrad Buff and Mark Goldblatt	Stan Salfas and William Hoy	Stan Salfas and William Hoy	Dan Zimmerman and Dirk Westervelt
