= Dr. Zaius =

Fictional character from the Planet of the Apes franchise

- Planet of the Apes character
- Maurice Evans as Dr. Zaius
- First appearance: Planet of the Apes (1963)
- Last appearance: Return to the Planet of the Apes (1975)
- Created by: Pierre Boulle
- Portrayed by: Original series; Maurice Evans; Television series; Booth Colman
- Voiced by: Richard Blackburn

In-universe information
- Species: Evolved orangutan
- Occupation: Politician

Dr. Zaius is a fictional character from the Planet of the Apes franchise, first appearing in Pierre Boulle's 1963 novel Planet of the Apes (La Planète des singes). He appears in the first two films of the franchise, where he is portrayed by Maurice Evans; in the television series, where he is played by Booth Colman; and in the animated series, where he is voiced by Richard Blackburn.

Dr. Zaius serves as the primary antagonist of the original film. Dr. Zaius is an orangutan politician and member of the Ape National Assembly, as well as Minister of Science and Chief Defender of the Faith. He is aware of the true origins of the ape society, and the reason why humanity fell as the dominant species, but does not wish the other apes to learn of this fact.

== Development ==
Dr. Zaius first appeared in Pierre Boulle's 1963 novel La Planete des singes, published in English as Planet of the Apes. A screen test for the 1968 film of the same name cast Edward G. Robinson as Dr. Zaius. For the film itself, Maurice Evans played the character, and he reprised his role in the first sequel, Beneath the Planet of the Apes (1970). In the 1974 television series, Booth Colman depicts the Zaius character.

To create the character, a plaster death mask was created of Evans's face. According to Evans:

"the sticky stuff was slapped on and not until I was on the verge of suffocation were soda straws inserted through the wet plaster into my nostrils and mouth. To be imprisoned helplessly ... was the oddest of sensations. Eventually, Johnny Chambers, creator of the ape makeup and expert torturer in chief, peeled off the beastly thing and bore it in triumph to his workshop ...."

Chambers used the death mask as a model for how to make the ape makeup. Each shooting day, makeup artist Kenny Chase applied the three pieces of the Dr. Zaius mask to Evans's face.

== Depictions ==
=== Novel ===
In Boulle's 1963 novel, Dr. Zaius is an antagonistic orangutan, appearing as an authority on simian science who believes talking humans are dangerous. When the apes' congress releases from captivity the novel's human protagonist, Ulysse Merou, on the grounds that he can speak, Zaius is dismissed from his position, though Merou fears that Zaius could return to power and threaten him again.

=== Original films ===
In Planet of the Apes (1968), Zaius is an orangutan simultaneously appointed as Minister of Science and Chief Defender of the Faith. Zaius knows the true origins of the ape society, how humanity fell as the dominant species, and the reasons why the "Forbidden Zone" is so named, and he blames human nature for it all. Zaius prefers an ignorant ape culture to the scientifically open one posed by Cornelius and Zira. Intelligent humans like Taylor (and human technology) cause Zaius to fear another downfall, along with the possibility of a human resurgence. Zaius destroys the archaeological findings of human artifacts predating the ape society. Zaius' actions are to protect the world from humanity, but he has respect for Taylor, advising him not to pursue the mystery as to how the apes evolved from humans because it will not help him and he may not like what he discovers.

In Beneath the Planet of the Apes, Zaius leaves on a military expedition with General Ursus to invade the "Forbidden Zone" and meets Taylor once more, in a showdown between the gorillas and a mutant human race living underground in the Zone. After Nova is killed by a stray bullet from a gorilla, Taylor resigns/commits himself to disabling the doomsday bomb with Brent's help, but gorilla gunfire kills Brent and mortally wounds Taylor. Taylor pleads with Zaius, but Zaius refuses any help (unaware of the active firing controls of the bomb), declaring "Man is evil, capable of nothing but destruction!" In Taylor's dying moments, his hand falls on the bomb's triggering mechanism, causing it to activate and destroy the Earth.

=== Television series ===
Zaius appears in the 1974 Planet of the Apes television series as an orangutan who chases the human protagonists in an attempt to hide the existence of intelligent humans. Although depicted by a different actor than in the films, the costume is the same, and the character occasionally seems to make references to the events of the movies. However, the series does not call him "Doctor", and according to Critical Studies in Television "[i]t's not entirely clear what Zaius is in the TV series but he seems to be more of a government official".

== Reception ==
A punk band from Anchorage, Alaska named Dr. Zaius, after the character, performed at the 1994 New Music Seminar. In 1996, The Simpsons episode "A Fish Called Selma" depicted an animated version of Dr. Zaius, voiced by Hank Azaria, as the subject of a song entitled "Dr. Zaius" (a parody of "Rock Me Amadeus"). Starting in 2012, comedian Dana Gould began performing as a parody version of the character in live performances and later in a recorded talk show format entitled “Hanging With Doctor Z”.

== Sources ==
=== Books ===
- Gittinger, Julie L. (2019). Personhood in Science Fiction: Religious and Philosophical Considerations. Palgrave Macmillan. doi:10.1007/978-3-030-30062-3. ISBN 978-3-030-30061-6.
- Greene, Eric (1998). Planet of the Apes as American Myth: Race, Politics, and Popular Culture. Wesleyan University Press. ISBN 0-8195-6329-3. First edition published by McFarland & Company in 1996.
- Littman, Greg (2013). "Banana Republic". In Huss, John (ed.). Planet of the Apes and Philosophy: Great Apes Think Alike. Popular Culture & Philosophy Series. Open Court Publishing Company. pp. 125–142. ISBN 978-0-8126-9822-0.
- Montoneri, Bernard; El Hajj, Murielle (2024). "Pierre Boulle's Planet of the Apes (1963): From Novel to Screenplay". In Montoneri, Bernard (ed.). Time Travel in World Literature and Cinema. Palgrave Macmillan. pp. 5–42. doi:10.1007/978-3-031-52315-1_2. ISBN 978-3-031-52314-4.
- Rollin, Bernard E. (2013). "Science's Crazy Dogma". In Huss, John (ed.). Planet of the Apes and Philosophy: Great Apes Think Alike. Popular Culture & Philosophy Series. With John Huss. Open Court Publishing Company. pp. 41–52. ISBN 978-0-8126-9822-0.
- Timmerman, Travis Michael (2013). "Who Comes First, Humans or Apes?". In Huss, John (ed.). Planet of the Apes and Philosophy: Great Apes Think Alike. Popular Culture & Philosophy Series. Open Court Publishing Company. pp. 67–82. ISBN 978-0-8126-9822-0.

=== Journals ===
- Benson, Nicholas (March 2019). "Apes on TV: Medium Specificity and Considerations of Continuity in Early Transmedia Storytelling". Critical Studies in Television: The International Journal of Television Studies. 14 (1): 22–39. doi:10.1177/1749602018809790.
- Jardine, Adam (2018). "The Pedagogic Value of Science Fiction: Teaching about Personhood and Nonhuman Rights with Planet of the Apes". The University of Notre Dame Australia Law Review. 20: 1–41.
- Vint, Sherryl (Autumn 2009). "Simians, Subjectivity and Sociality: 2001: a Space Odyssey and Two Versions of Planet of the Apes". Science Fiction Film and Television. 2 (2): 225–250.

=== Periodicals ===
- Liebenson, Donald (February 14, 2022). "Dana Gould's Decade as Planet of the Apes' Dr. Zaius". Vulture.
- Strauss, Neil (July 22, 1994). "For Unknowns of Pop, a Gig to Remember". The New York Times. pp. C1, C26.
- Ulin, David L. (July 14, 2014). "The Transformation of Planet of the Apes, from Book to Movie Legend". Los Angeles Times.
