= Return to the Planet of the Apes =

1975–1976 animated series

- DVD cover
- Genre: Animation; Adventure; Action; Cartoon series; Science fiction
- Based on: Characters by Pierre Boulle
- Developed by: David H. DePatie; Friz Freleng
- Starring: Austin Stoker; Phillippa Harris; Henry Corden; Richard Blackburn; Edwin Mills; Claudette Nevins; Tom Williams
- Theme music composer: Dean Elliott
- Country of origin: United States
- Original language: English
- No. of episodes: 13

Production
- Running time: 24 minutes without commercials
- Production companies: DePatie–Freleng Enterprises; 20th Century-Fox Television

Original release
- Network: NBC
- Release: September 6 – November 29, 1975

Return to the Planet of the Apes is a 1975 American Saturday morning animated television series based on the 1968 film Planet of the Apes and its sequels, which were, in turn, based on the 1963 novel of the same name by Pierre Boulle. The series aired on NBC from September 6 to November 29, 1975. Unlike the film, its sequels, and the 1974 live-action television series, which involved a primitive ape civilization, Return to the Planet of the Apes depicted a technologically advanced society, complete with automobiles, film, and television; as such it more closely resembled both Boulle's original novel and early concepts for the first Apes film which were changed due to budgetary limitations in the late 1960s.

Produced following the last of the big-screen features and short-lived live-action television series, this series was among the last Planet of the Apes projects for several years following a number of comic books from Marvel Comics (August 1974 – February 1977) and a series of audio adventures from Power Records in 1974. Aside from a number of comic book series published by Malibu Comics in the early 1990s, the next project based upon Boulle's concepts would be Tim Burton's reimagining in 2001.

Along with the second Planet of the Apes film, Beneath the Planet of the Apes, this is one of only two original Planet of the Apes productions in which Roddy McDowall was not involved.

== Production ==
In 1975, after the failure of the live-action series, NBC and 20th Century Fox agreed to adapt Planet of the Apes for an animated series. The network contracted DePatie–Freleng Enterprises to produce a half-hour Saturday-morning cartoon titled Return to the Planet of the Apes. Doug Wildey, co-creator of Jonny Quest, took on most creative control as associate producer, storyboard director, and supervising director. Wildey had only watched the original film and Beneath, and thus based his interpretation on them. As such, the show relied less on the themes and plot developments from Escape, Conquest, and Battle and instead returned to the Vietnam War and Cold War themes prominent in the first two films.

The plot concerns three American astronauts, Bill Hudson (Tom Williams), Jeff Allen (Austin Stoker, who played MacDonald in Battle), and Judy Franklin (Claudette Nevins), who inadvertently journey to Earth's far future. They find the world populated by three groups: mute humans who inhabit desert caves, subterranean human "Underdwellers" fashioned after the mutants of Beneath, and civilized apes who subjugate the humans. Through the show, the astronauts become increasingly involved in the planet's affairs and in defending the humans against an ape invasion. The cast featured characters based on those from the previous films and TV series, including Nova (Nevins again), General Urko (Henry Cordin), Zira (Philippa Harris), Cornelius (Edwin Mills), and Dr. Zaius (Richard Blackburn). NBC broadcast thirteen episodes between September 6 and November 21, 1975. The show did not achieve particularly strong ratings. The network considered producing a second, three-episode season to complete the story, but this never materialized.

== Broadcasting history ==
Airing on NBC, the series premiered on September 6, 1975 and was broadcast through November 29, 1975 and continuing in reruns until September 4, 1976, although only thirteen episodes were produced. The series aired Saturday mornings at 11:00 AM Eastern/10:00 AM Central. The opening credits voice-over was done by Ted Knight.

The series was later shown in reruns on the Sci Fi Channel in 1992 as part of Sci Fi Cartoon Quest. In Asia, the series was broadcast on STAR TV in 1994 - 1997.

Music for the series was provided by Dean Elliott, recorded in England and conducted by Eric Rogers.

== Story ==
As with the film and the live-action series, Return to the Planet of the Apes involved a handful of astronauts from Earth who were hurtled into the future and found themselves stuck in a world populated by advanced apes and primitive humans. Over the course of the thirteen episodes the astronauts attempted to keep one step ahead of the apes while at the same time trying to make some sense of what had happened. Additionally, they did their best to safeguard the human population from the apes.

Each episode was self-contained to an extent. The story threads did weave in and out, with characters and plots from earlier episodes popping up in later ones. In order for the series to make any sense, the episodes need to be viewed in order.

The animated series does chronologically fit with the rest of the Apes universe. It borrows characters and elements from the movies, the TV series and the original novel. General Urko is borrowed from the TV series. Along with Zaius, Zira and Cornelius, Brent (renamed here as Ron Brent) and Nova are from the movie series. Krador and the Underdwellers in the animated series are loosely based on the mutants in Beneath the Planet of the Apes.

Unlike the movies, the animated series borrows more from the original novel. The apes live in a more civilized society and they have televisions, radios, cars, airplanes, and boats.

As with the live action television series, the animated series was concluded before the resolution of the storyline, and it is not learned if the astronauts are able to return to their own time period. There are some hints to the conclusion of the series. Doctor Zaius, in recognising the threat of a military overthrow from General Urko, assures that he is relieved of command. Further, Cornelius and Zira, in recognising that simian society was established long after human society had deteriorated, believed that the time was right for humans to be offered equal rights to that of apes and intend to present their proposition to the Senate.

Characters in the animated series frequently mention prominent apes noticeably named after human historical figures by appropriately inserting the word "ape" into their name. A notable example is "William Apespeare", an ape analog of William Shakespeare. Another scene shows a couple of ape soldiers chatting about a new movie called The Apefather, an apparent analog of The Godfather (unlike the live-action series and movies, the ape society is presented as being technologically advanced – as in the novel – rather than agrarian).

== Cast and characters ==
- Bill Hudson (Richard Blackburn and Tom Williams) – One of the two male astronauts; blond, blue-eyed, depicted as wearing a blue T-shirt and white pants.
- Cornelius (Henry Corden and Edwin Mills) – A male chimpanzee scientist.
- Zira (Philippa Harris) – A female chimpanzee scientist who is very outspoken against the gorilla regime.
- General Urko (Henry Corden) – A power-hungry gorilla general who plans to drive the humans and Underdwellers off the planet as well as to conquer all non-gorillas.
- Judy Franklin (Claudette Nevins) – The lone female astronaut and an expert airplane pilot; she is kidnapped and held by the Underdwellers for a time before being rescued.
- Jeff Allen (Austin Stoker) – The other male astronaut; an African American, depicted as wearing a red turtleneck shirt. Stoker previously played Mr. MacDonald in Battle for the Planet of the Apes, and is the only cast member of the live action movies to have played a part in the series.
- Dr. Zaius (Richard Blackburn) – The orangutan leader of the Ape Senate, depicted as a grandfatherly politician who questions the tactics of General Urko.
- Nova (Claudette Nevins) – A human female who joins Bill, Judy, and Jeff on their adventures.
- Ronald Brent – A U.S. astronaut who launched in the 21st century but arrived in the time of ape rule a number of years prior to the Hudson/Allen/Franklin expedition.
- Krador – The leader of the Underdwellers.
- The Underdwellers – A group of underground persons based on the mutants in the film Beneath the Planet of the Apes.
- Kigor - A virtuous yeti who helps the group twice; first by saving them from Urko's soldiers, and next by helping them defeat a mutant bird.

== Episodes ==
No.	Title	Written by	Original release date
1	"Flames of Doom"	Larry Spiegel	September 6, 1975
The NASA spacecraft Venturer travels through space at an advanced speed, allowing astronauts Bill Hudson, Jeff Allen and Judy Franklin to travel years into the future. After beginning to reel wildly, the craft enters a planet's atmosphere and crashes into a desolate desert. Bill, Jeff and Judy escape their disabled, sinking ship and discover they are in the year 3979 A.D. With no better plan, they begin trekking across the wasteland. They encounter electrical storms, high-velocity winds, tremors, unexplained flames and ruins. During their journey, an earthquake swallows Judy, and the other astronauts collapse from exhaustion. A tribe of primitive humans takes the two men to their cave dwellings and nurse them back to strength. One tribeswoman, Nova, wears US astronaut I.D. dog tags around her neck belonging to Ronald Brent, an astronaut born in the year 2079. Gas bombs are eventually thrown into the caves by an army of gorillas. Nova manages to hide Jeff, but Bill is captured along with most of the tribe and taken to Ape City in cages. The Book of Simian Prophecy states that humans must only be exterminated if it is ever discovered that they can speak.
2	"Escape from Ape City"	Larry Spiegel	September 13, 1975
Realizing that Bill can speak, one of the captured humans motions for him to keep silent. At Ape City, chimpanzee scientists Zira and Cornelius choose Bill and other humans for laboratory study. Bill, whom Zira dubs "Blue Eyes", scores highly on all tests, much to her delight. After Cornelius suggests doing a probe of Bill's brain, the astronaut speaks in protest. Zira and Cornelius are shocked. While Bill explains who he is, a gorilla soldier overhears him. He reports his discovery to the Supreme Council, the only apes who know that man used to rule everything before destroying his civilization with war. They know that if man ever regains intelligence he could regain power and eventually destroy the world again. Orangutan leader Dr. Zaius orders all humans destroyed. Meanwhile, Zira and Cornelius help Bill escape. At the city limits, he meets Nova and Jeff. Together, they break into an army stockade, steal a truck and haul all the captured humans away. After reaching the mountains, they block the pass by blowing up the truck.
3	"The Unearthly Prophecy"	Jack Kaplan and John Barrett	September 20, 1975
While searching the desert, the gorilla army spots Bill and Jeff. A chase ensues that is interrupted when a hole opens up on the ground. As the doorway closes, the two men crawl in and ride a conveyor down a dark shaft. There, they find the remains of the New York Public Library among rubble. This reveals to them that the planet they are in is actually future Earth. Bill and Jeff then enter a cavern operated by cloaked figures. An alarm rings and the figures begin chanting the name "Oosa" (USA). Following the crowd, the astronauts find Judy in a hooded robe. She is being mind-controlled by the Underdwellers, descendants of humans who sought safety underground during the holocaust. They believe that prophecy has foretold of Judy, or Oosa, helping them return to the surface. Jeff helps Judy revive her memory, and the three astronauts escape. They encounter illusions sent to stop them, but manage to reach the surface opening. However, the version of Judy with Bill and Jeff turns out to be an illusion, a projection, and she vanishes just before the men crawl up to the surface. The pair vow to return for her someday. Note: The novelization of this episode is titled, A Date With Judy, which may have been an earlier title. Some have erroneously assumed that to be an unfilmed episode.
4	"Tunnel of Fear"	Larry Spiegel	September 27, 1975
Bill and Jeff know that the humanoids must be moved to a safer place for protection from the apes. Their one hope is to ask Zira and Cornelius for help. As night falls, the two men sneak into Ape City. After entering the lab through a window, they talk to Cornelius and Zira. Cornelius is reluctant to help, but ends up suggesting a valley which lies to the south of his latest digging site. He has never seen it, but knows of its existence from an old map in the Simian National Library. He promises to make a copy of the map and take them to the general area. The next day, the group travels to Cornelius' digging sites. The valley can be safely reached by an unexplored underground river. Bill and Jeff take the map, bid Zira and Cornelius farewell and head for the underground river. While traveling, a waterfall current begins pulling them nearer the edge. The walls are too smooth to hold and they plummet over. Later, they are revived by humans; they have reached the humanoid caves. They decide to name the discovered haven New Valley.
5	"Lagoon of Peril"	J.C. Strong	October 4, 1975
A gorilla soldier returns delirious from the Forbidden Zone, claiming to have seen a craft fall out of the sky and crash in a lagoon while carrying three humans (Bill, Jeff and Judy). To verify this story, the apes decide to lead an expedition into the Forbidden Zone. If the ship is found, there will be enough evidence to begin the annihilation of all humans, as the apes believe that Bill and Jeff have infected them with the ability to think. The astronauts decide to reach the ship first and blow it up, with Nova acting as their guide. As it travels through the Forbidden Zone, illusions keep slowing down the ape expedition. Reaching the lagoon first, the humans raft to the capsule and set its self-destruct mechanism to detonate in five minutes. However, on their way out, a giant sea serpent appears. Jeff drives it off with a blast from the ship's laser. Before the ship explodes, the humans reach the shore. The army arrives and, after seeing the serpent, Zaius deduces that what the delirious soldier saw was that animal, not a spacecraft. He announces to the press that rumors of intelligent humans are false.
6	"Terror on Ice Mountain"	Bruce Shelly	October 11, 1975
During an archaeological dig, Cornelius uncovers A Day at the Zoo, an ancient human book. If the gorilla general Urko ever gets it, that book can be deadly to humanity, as it might prove that man preceded the ape. Cornelius also finds an old blueprint for a hot-air balloon. Ape-built balloons have always crashed, but this design is different. With help from the astronauts, Cornelius builds a balloon and departs with Bill. They reach Mount Ghar, but are forced off course by a storm and crash. Because of the terribly low temperatures, they collapse and are taken to the temple of Kigor, god of the mountain apes. There, the High Lama suggests traveling up the mountain and making an offering to Kigor, a giant statue that the balloon struck before crashing. On their journey they are attacked by gorilla ski-troopers. Kigor breaks out of his ice covering, revealing himself to be a real, living Kong-like giant gorilla and subdues the ski-troopers to protect the group. Before leaving, Cornelius asks the Lama to keep the book. After placing it in a cave below Kigor, the Lama assures that no one will touch the book but Bill and Cornelius.
7	"River of Flames"	Jack Kaplan and John Barrett	October 18, 1975
Judy appears to Bill and Jeff, insisting that they come to the below world. Apparently, lava is flooding the below world, and if it reaches the reactor room, the Underdwellers (and perhaps the entire planet) will die. The laser they rescued from the ship could cut a new path for the lava to flow away from there. Bill and Jeff agree to help only if Judy is allowed to leave with them. Still believing Judy to be the fulfillment of their prophecy, Krador, the Underdwellers' leader, reluctantly agrees, if she returns when needed. Meanwhile, gorilla soldiers find and steal Bill and Jeff's laser. Sneaking into the army's camp, the pair reclaims the weapon. At the below world, they enter the main cavern and begin blasting through the mountainside. However, the laser runs out of power, as one of its energy cells was lost at the apes' camp. Seeing smoke coming from the mountain, the apes use artillery on what they think is Bill's campfire. Instead, they complete the hole Jeff had begun, letting the lava diverge. The reactor is safe and Krador lets Judy leave with Bill and Jeff.
8	"Screaming Wings"	Jack Kaplan and John Barrett	October 25, 1975
Heading for the humanoid settlement, Bill, Jeff and Judy spot the ape army testing a restored World War II-era fighter plane. Meanwhile, Urko demands Zaius to give him complete authority, and threatens using the plane to secure his power. After hearing of this, Zira and Cornelius meet with Bill and give him directions to Urko's fortress. There, the astronauts slip past the guards and find the plane's hangar. They discover that, using the plane as a guide, the apes are building an entire fleet. Humanoids are being herded as target practice in the next day's demonstration. While wearing disguises, the three humans approach Largo, the airshow's pilot, and tie him up. Judy disguises herself in Largo's flight suit while Jeff and Bill send a locomotive crashing into the aircraft factory, destroying it. Without the original plane, the apes cannot create more. Bill and Jeff round all the humans into the truck and speed off while Judy protects them from the air. Later, in the desert, the astronauts wonder if the plane could ever help them get back home.
9	"Trail to the Unknown"	Larry Spiegel	November 1, 1975
In Ape City, Dr. Zaius visits Cornelius and Zira to thank them for stealing the plane and sabotaging Urko's dictatorship. He also insists that their secret is safe with him. Meanwhile, Bill, Jeff, Judy and the human tribe depart on the river for New Valley. The trip takes them to a desert, where they come upon the wreck of a futuristic United States spaceship. It belongs to Ron Brent, who left Earth on August 6, 2109. After he crashed, Nova's tribe nursed his broken leg. He decided to join in their travels, but was separated from them. He has lived in his crashed ship for the past twenty years. Brent joins their expedition, bringing his ship's self-destruct mechanism with him. Finally, the humans reach New Valley and begin building a fortress. Just as it is finished, the gorilla army arrives. However, their gas grenades do not penetrate the fortress. Unable to believe the humans were smart enough to build defenses, Urko is forced to return to the city for the heavier artillery. Figuring he will return, Bill decides to destroy the land bridge into the Valley with Brent's destruct mechanism. First, however, they must get the plane.
10	"Attack from the Clouds"	Larry Spiegel	November 8, 1975
During the night, Ape City is awakened by the sounds of a huge flying monster. Zaius later tells the Senate that the monster has been scared off. In New Valley, Bill and Judy prepare to leave and return with the aircraft. As they watch over their herd of animals, the monster swoops down, takes one of the calves and flies away. During the night, Bill and Judy spot an ape patrol searching for the P-40. The next day, they find the aircraft exactly where they left it. Back at the human settlement, the monster attacks again, causing a stampede that nearly tramples Nova. The herd is chased into a cave. Jeff plans to cut an opening in the hillside so that food can be taken to the herd. Bill and Judy reach New Valley just in time to engage the monster in an air battle. At the end, the P-40 strikes the monster with its landing gear and the beast plummets into the lake below. Bill and Judy land safely, but the monster survives the fall.
11	"Mission of Mercy"	Larry Spiegel	November 15, 1975
As a result of the fight with the monster, most of the plane's fuel is gone, leaving only a two-to-three-hour supply. Bill and Jeff leave to find more fuel, planning to hide inside an old farm house. Meanwhile, Nova gets Acute Infectious Streptococholus, a contagious lung disease which is fatal after seventy-two hours. However, there is a serum that can cure the victim and immunize others. Believing Zira and Cornelius could help, Judy flies to the farmhouse. The trip exhausts all of the fuel left in the plane. They now have a day and a night to get more fuel, obtain the serum and return to New Valley. Judy reaches the lab, where Zira and Cornelius agree to make the serum. Meanwhile, the men reach an abandoned air base and begin loading fuel into a truck. The apes finish the serum and drive Judy back to the plane. While carrying the fuel, Bill and Jeff are spotted by gorillas, but manage to get away. Judy and the chimps meet the men at the farmhouse. With the plane, Judy reaches New Valley in time to save Nova and prevent the disease from spreading.
12	"Invasion of the Underdwellers"	J.C. Strong	November 22, 1975
Urko and his gorillas steal valuable items all over Ape City, hoping to frame the Underdwellers and convince Zaius to declare war on the below world. At New Valley, Krador appears, announcing the Underdwellers are innocent. Meanwhile, Urko assures the council that he can win the war by blowing up the tunnel entrance to the below world. Krador shows the astronauts the Tomb of the Unknown Ape, where all the stolen items are hidden. They must act soon, before Urko detonates the tunnel entrance, flooding the below world and causing Ape City to collapse. With Krador's help, Bill convinces Zira and Cornelius to take Zaius to the tomb. After seeing the stolen goods, Zaius tries to radio Urko and halt the attack, but the general ignores him. While the Underdwellers hold a final service in the great cathedral with Judy, Bill and Jeff reach the tunnel's entrance and send the gorillas' barge of explosives back toward the dock where it detonates. Furious, Zaius orders the gorillas to clean up the damage and return the stolen items. Urko must also apologize to the city on TV, and the Senate suspends him from duty for three months without pay.
13	"Battle of the Titans"	Bruce Shelly	November 29, 1975
With Urko out of the picture, Cornelius and Zira decide to risk a trip to Mount Ghar and retrieve the ancient book that proves that man once ruled the planet. Perhaps by showing the Senate the evidence, laws will be passed granting man some kind of protection. Meanwhile, Urko convinces Col. Rotok, the gorilla army's new leader, to attack a still-unprotected flank of New Valley. Bill and Cornelius decide to go together on the hot air balloon as a gesture to the High Lama that apes and humans are together in this decision. They are spotted on takeoff by gorilla soldiers, whose driving awakens the flying monster from the lake it had fallen in. When the tribe realizes that the army is closing in, Judy gets on the plane and frightens the gorillas with the old aircraft. At the mountains, the High Lama takes Bill and Cornelius to Kigor. They dig up A Day at the Zoo before the monster appears and attacks the group. The ice over Kigor then crumbles, and the giant ape fights off the monster. Bill and Cornelius mend Kigor's wounds before flying home, hoping the book will bring unity to Earth.

== Reception ==
The series has been criticized for poor production values. Reviewers felt that the constant reuse of backgrounds and lack of movement made the action on screen dull and slow. The voicework has also been criticized for sometimes being unemotional and equally monotonous.

Despite these criticisms, the series was noted for highly detailed backgrounds, illustrations, character designs and camera effects, due in part to veteran cartoonist Doug Wildey. While animation was poor due to budget and time constraints, still artwork, which featured prominently in the program, was extremely detailed, with extensive shading, looking more like a comic book than a television cartoon.

== Home release ==
The Return to the Planet of the Apes series was released as a part of the Ultimate DVD Collection in early 2006 by 20th Century Fox Home Entertainment. The Return to the Planet of the Apes: The Complete Animated Series release on DVD was delayed until October 3, 2006. This was the first time the series was released stand-alone on DVD. Only three of the episodes were restored in the discs included in the Ultimate DVD Collection, but all 13 were restored in the individual release. The individual release also included them in their intended order, as opposed to their airdate order as presented in the box set. The individual release also includes the option of watching the episodes with a preview of the next episode, which was not present in the box set release.

The episode list on the back of the DVD case for the individual release has many errors. The episodes are listed in airdate order as opposed to the chronological order on the actual DVDs, one episode is listed as airing the day before it actually aired and two are shown as having the same airdate, resulting in the airdates of the two subsequent episodes being one week off.

== Novelizations ==
Three novelizations based on the series were published by Ballantine Books in 1976 under the pseudonym William Arrow: Visions from Nowhere, Escape from Terror Lagoon and Man, the Hunted Animal. The first and third books were written by William Rostler and the second by Donald J. Pfeil. In 2018, Titan Books reprinted all three in Planet of the Apes Omnibus: Volume 4.
