= Kingdom of the Planet of the Apes (soundtrack) =

Kingdom of the Planet of the Apes (Original Motion Picture Soundtrack)

Film score by John Paesano
- Released: May 10, 2024
- Recorded: 2024
- Genre: Film score
- Length: 113:57
- Label: Hollywood
- Producer: John Paesano

John Paesano chronology
Diary of a Wimpy Kid Christmas: Cabin Fever (2023)	Kingdom of the Planet of the Apes (2024)

Kingdom of the Planet of the Apes (Original Motion Picture Soundtrack) is the score album to the 2024 film of the same name directed by Wes Ball, which is the standalone sequel to War for the Planet of the Apes (2017), the fourth installment in the Planet of the Apes reboot franchise, and the tenth film overall in the film series. The album features musical score composed by John Paesano and was released through Hollywood Records alongside the film on May 10, 2024.

== Development ==
John Paesano was assigned as the composer for Kingdom of the Planet of the Apes, marking his fourth collaboration with Wes Ball after working on the Maze Runner film trilogy (2014–2018). He is the third composer after Patrick Doyle and Michael Giacchino, who scored the predecessors in the Planet of the Apes reboot film series. Paesano wanted to honor Jerry Goldsmith's score for the 1968 film and Giacchino's score for Dawn of the Planet of the Apes (2014) and War for the Planet of the Apes (2017), to follow the musical legacy of the franchise and take the score in a new direction where he wanted "to take it to a place where the franchise is headed".

Paesano went ahead with organic instrumentation and soundscape for the score, with a detuned and imperfect piano cue played prominently in the score as "the idea was to use instruments that could exist in the world they were living in, and maybe that piano had been sitting in a schoolhouse for 300 years, and they stumbled across it". The percussion base was borrowed from Goldsmith's original motifs and he further used oil drums with the notion of the oil drum existing in the fictional kingdom.

The score was built on three recurring themes: a theme where the humans and the apes discover the new world, the eagle clan theme and Noa's theme. He wanted to use simple motif for Noa's theme as the character goes on a journey of self-discovery. The theme follows a tonal shift after Noa leaves the kingdom, where he referred Goldsmith's cues for the themes and grows stronger in the climatic water chase sequence. It was further built aggressive when the metallic oil drum rounds out the percussion. The French horn players blow through the air pieces instead of the body to give a breathing sound.

One of the themes "Human Hunt" recalls Goldsmith's music where the similar sequence featured in the 1968 film and "accompanying it were Goldsmith’s harsh and syncopated rhythms driven by percussion as armed apes on horseback chase humans". He rearranged the first 30 seconds of the theme in the beginning which brought the film to life.

== Track listing ==
Kingdom of the Planet of the Apes (Original Motion Picture Soundtrack)
No.	Title	Length
1.	"Discovery"	6:31
2.	"The Climb"	3:01
3.	"Maybe Echo"	2:10
4.	"Eagle Clan"	3:52
5.	"We Have Good Rain"	2:04
6.	"Broken"	2:47
7.	"Marauders in the Mist"	3:45
8.	"For Caesar"	4:27
9.	"Noa's Purpose"	4:12
10.	"The Valley Beyond"	1:44
11.	"I Am Raka"	5:21
12.	"Memories of Home"	3:50
13.	"Caesar's Compassion"	2:07
14.	"She Is Different"	3:03
15.	"They Are Like You"	3:34
16.	"Human Hunt"	4:44
17.	"New Weapon"	5:15
18.	"A Kingdom for Apes"	3:41
19.	"What a Wonderful Day"	3:29
20.	"Apes Will Learn, I Will Learn"	3:49
21.	"Together Strong"	3:10
22.	"Very Clever Apes"	7:57
23.	"Simian Summit"	3:31
24.	"A Past Discovered"	5:44
25.	"Cannot Trust a Human"	5:21
26.	"Ape Aquatics"	3:57
27.	"It Was Ours"	4:40
28.	"We Will Rebuild"	4:03
29.	"A New Age"	2:08
Total length:		113:57

== Reception ==
David Rooney of The Hollywood Reporter wrote "John Paesano’s full-bodied orchestral score propels things along with a robust emotional charge". Pete Hammond of Deadline Hollywood described it as a "stirring" score. JoBlo.com wrote "the score by John Paesano nods at Jerry Goldsmith’s classic score for the original in a pretty pleasing way." Dishya Sharma of News18 wrote "The music by John Paesano helps elevate scenes in many places." ComicBook.com described it as "a killer score by John Paesano that calls back to the Jerry Goldsmith themes of the original film". The Film Stage was critical of the score, saying that it "infrequently ushers in twangy guitar strums that make its genre ambitions not just nakedly apparent, but embarrassing". Zanobard Reviews wrote "John Paesano’s Kingdom of the Planet Of The Apes is an impressive score, forming a pretty perfect bridge between Michael Giacchino’s wondrously serene and Jerry Goldsmith’s iconically eerie prior works for the franchise while also introducing some excellent new themes of its own, and binding it all together in an Apes musical tapestry that’s more than worthy of the franchise."
