= The Marvelous Palace And Other Stories =

The Marvelous Palace and Other Stories
- First edition (French)
- Author: Pierre Boulle
- Original title: Histoires Perfides
- Language: French
- Publisher: Groupe Flammarion; Vanguard Press (English)
- Publication date: 1976; 1977 (English)
- Publication place: France
- Media type: Print (hardcover)
- Pages: 187
- ISBN: 0-8149-0788-1
- OCLC: 3965973
- LC Class: PZ4.B764 Mar PQ2603.O754

The Marvelous Palace And Other Stories (French: Histoires Perfides) is a collection of short stories by French author Pierre Boulle, published in French in 1976 and in English in 1977. The English language edition is translated by Margaret Giovanelli. The collection contains six stories, all thematically related, and presented in the voice of a centenarian story-teller from the Orient.

The collection includes an introduction, in which the narrator introduces the storyteller, who is generally referred to as "Old Man." After the introduction, each of the six short stories is narrated by the Old Man:

- The Royal Pardon
- The Marvelous Palace
- The Laws
- The Limits of Endurance
- Compassion Service
- The Angelic Monsieur Edyh

The stories are all recountings of tales from the Old Man's distant past as a minister of "the Religion of Doubt" in the far off Kingdom of Shandong. Each story presents a brief moral dilemma, usually with a surprise ending.
