= Beneath the Planet of the Apes =

1970 American science fiction film

- Theatrical release poster by Tom Chantrell
- Directed by: Ted Post
- Screenplay by: Paul Dehn
- Story by: Paul Dehn; Mort Abrahams
- Based on: Characters by Pierre Boulle
- Produced by: Arthur P. Jacobs
- Starring: James Franciscus; Kim Hunter; Maurice Evans; Linda Harrison; Charlton Heston
- Cinematography: Milton R. Krasner
- Edited by: Marion Rothman
- Music by: Leonard Rosenman
- Production company: APJAC Productions
- Distributed by: 20th Century-Fox
- Release date: May 26, 1970
- Running time: 95 minutes
- Country: United States
- Language: English
- Budget: $2.5 million
- Box office: $19 million

Beneath the Planet of the Apes is a 1970 American science fiction film directed by Ted Post from a screenplay by Paul Dehn, based on a story by Dehn and Mort Abrahams. The film is the sequel to Planet of the Apes (1968) and the second installment in the original Planet of the Apes film series. It stars James Franciscus, Kim Hunter, Maurice Evans, and Linda Harrison, and features Charlton Heston in a supporting role. In the film, a second spacecraft arrives on the planet ruled by apes, carrying astronaut Brent (Franciscus), who searches and finds Taylor (Heston) only to realize the apes are not their greatest threat.

Beneath the Planet of the Apes was released in the United States on May 26, 1970, by 20th Century-Fox. The film received mixed reviews from critics. It was followed by Escape from the Planet of the Apes in 1971.

== Plot ==
Time-displaced astronaut Taylor and the mute Nova (Note: First introduced in Planet of the Apes.) travel through the desert of the Forbidden Zone in search of a new life away from Ape City. Without warning, fire shoots up from the ground and chasms open. Confused by this, Taylor investigates a cliff wall and disappears through it. Unable to reach him, Nova is left alone.

After being sent to search for Taylor and his crew, a second spaceship crash-lands on the Forbidden Zone. Brent, the only survivor, notes he is in the year 3955, but assumes he has travelled to another planet. After burying his fellow astronaut Skipper, he encounters Nova and notices she is wearing Taylor's dog tags. Hoping Taylor is still alive, he rides with her to Ape City and is shocked to discover the simian civilization. The gorilla General Ursus leads a rally for the apes to conquer the Forbidden Zone and use it as a potential food source, against the objections of the orangutan Dr. Zaius. Brent is wounded by a gorilla soldier and taken by Nova to the home of the chimpanzees Cornelius and Zira, who treat his wound and mention their time with Taylor.

Attempting to flee the city, Brent and Nova are captured by gorillas. Ursus orders they be used for target practice, but Zira helps them escape. They hide in a cave that turns out to be the ruins of the Queensboro Plaza station of the New York City Subway. Brent realizes he is in Earth's post-apocalyptic future. Upon hearing a humming sound deeper into the tunnels, Brent becomes so agitated and erratic, he attempts to kill Nova but fails, before stopping and backing away to another room. Entering the remains of St. Patrick's Cathedral, he finds a population of telepathic humans who worship an ancient nuclear bomb.

Brent and Nova are captured and interrogated by the telepaths, who are descendants of the human survivors of a nuclear holocaust. They mutated over generations and claim to be a peaceful society, despite using mind-control and illusion on their enemies. The mutants force Brent into revealing the apes' march on the Forbidden Zone. Their attempts to repel the invaders with illusions of fire and other horrors fail, as Zaius sees through them. With the apes closing in, the telepaths plan to detonate their "Divine Bomb" as a last resort, holding a religious ritual. During the ritual, the telepaths remove their human masks to reveal disfigurements of sickly pale skin, scarring and vascular varicose disease.

Brent is separated from Nova and taken to a cell where he finds Taylor. One mutant, explaining that they cannot let them leave the city alive for fear of revealing it to the apes, uses his telepathic powers to force Brent and Taylor to fight each other. Nova escapes her guard and runs to the cell, screaming her first spoken word: "Taylor!" This breaks the mutant's concentration, freeing the astronauts from his control long enough for them to kill him. Taylor recognizes the bomb's insignia "ΑΩ" as a "doomsday bomb", which has a cobalt casing capable of igniting the atmosphere and incinerating the entire planet.

The apes invade the subterranean city, making their way to the cathedral; many mutants are either captured, killed, or die by suicide. After Nova is killed by a gorilla in the midst of the chaos, Taylor and Brent reach the cathedral as Mendez, the telepaths' leader, is shot dead after raising the bomb into activation position. The humans attempt to stop Ursus from accidentally setting off the weapon, but Taylor is shot in the chest while pleading to Zaius. Zaius refuses to listen and decries humanity's violence and the ruination of all things, unaware that his own apes are doing the same thing. When Brent is gunned down after killing Ursus, the mortally wounded Taylor curses Zaius, before he dyingly collapses, bringing down his hand on the bomb's detonation switch. The bomb goes off, destroying the entire planet.

== Cast ==
=== Humans ===
- James Franciscus as Brent: an American astronaut, who was sent on a mission to rescue Taylor.
- Linda Harrison as Nova: a human native to the planet, unable to speak.
- Tod Andrews as Skipper: an American astronaut, part of Brent's rescue mission.
- Charlton Heston as Taylor: an American astronaut, marooned on the planet and captured by the mutated humans.

=== Apes ===
- Kim Hunter as Zira: A chimpanzee and veterinary psychologist, wife of Cornelius, who helps the humans avoid capture from the apes.
- Maurice Evans as Dr. Zaius: An orangutan and leader in the ape's religion and science ministries.
- James Gregory as General Ursus: A gorilla and leader of the ape's military, who convinces the apes to invade the Forbidden Zone to stop the threat posed by the humans.
- David Watson as Cornelius: A chimpanzee and archeologist, husband of Zira.
- Thomas Gomez as Minister: An orangutan and minister in the ape's religion.

=== Mutant humans ===
- Paul Richards as Mendez: A mutated human and the leader of the mutant humans who live in the Forbidden Zone, is referred to as "Mendes the Divine and Invincible, Leader of the Underground" in promotional material.
- Victor Buono as Fat Man: A mutated human and member of the religious council of the mutants, is referred to as "Adiposo" in promotional material.
- Jeff Corey as Caspay: A mutated human and member of the religious council of the mutants.
- Natalie Trundy as Albina: A mutated human and member of the religious council of the mutants.
- Don Pedro Colley as Negro: A mutated human and member of the religious council of the mutants, is referred to as "Ongoro" in promotional material.
- Gregory Sierra as Verger: A mutated human, who sends Brent and Nova to be interrogated by the religious council of the mutants.

== Production ==
=== Development and writing ===
Soon after Planet of the Apes became a hit, a sequel started being considered by 20th Century-Fox. Screenwriter Rod Serling was consulted, but the producers wanted the script sooner than Serling, who was busy at the time, would have been able to provide it so Serling declined. Then the producers turned to the author of the original novel, Pierre Boulle, who wrote a draft for a sequel called Planet of the Men, where protagonist George Taylor would lead an uprising of the enslaved men to take back control from the apes as the gorilla general Ursus wants to fight humans. Boulle's script was rejected as it was felt that it lacked the "visual shock and the surprise" of the original. Associate producer Mort Abrahams then wrote story elements, and British writer Paul Dehn was hired to develop them into a script, tentatively called Planet of the Apes Revisited. Dehn drew on his trauma of the 1945 atomic bombings and the fear of nuclear warfare on the story. One of the elements thought up by Abrahams and Dehn was a half-human, half-ape child, but despite even going through make-up tests this was dropped due to the implication of bestiality. According to screenwriter Dehn the idea for Beneath the Planet of the Apes came about from the end of the first installment which suggested that New York City was buried underground.

Although Charlton Heston showed little interest in reprising his role as Taylor, studio head Richard D. Zanuck thought the actor was essential to the sequel. After some disagreement with the actor's agents, Heston agreed to briefly appear with the provision that his character be killed and that his pay go to charity. The writers decided to have Taylor disappear at the story's start and only return by the film's ending, and have a new protagonist for the major part of the story. James Franciscus accepted the role of Brent as a break from his usual TV fare.

Director Franklin J. Schaffner was invited to return to the series, but declined due to a commitment to Patton. Television and film director Ted Post was approached, and while objecting to the script for "not making a point at all", the producers asked what he did not like. Post then wrote a letter saying that "the loss of a planet is the loss of all hope". Post tried to get the other writer of the original, Michael Wilson, but a budget cut prevented him from doing so. Post and Franciscus – who wanted to help clarify the actions of and give depth to the character of Brent – spent a week rewriting the script, leading to over fifty pages of notes suggesting story ideas to fix some of the narrative problems in Paul Dehn's script.

Roddy McDowall could not return for his role in this sequel, because he was in London directing Tam Lin. Actor David Watson portrayed Cornelius in this film with McDowall only appearing briefly in clips from the first film used during Beneath's pre-title sequence. Along with the animated series Return to the Planet of the Apes, this film is one of only two 1970s Planet of the Apes productions in which McDowall does not appear. Orson Welles was offered the role of General Ursus, but he turned it down objecting against spending all his screentime in a mask and make-up. The part ultimately went to James Gregory.

Before Zanuck was fired as studio president during production, he suggested that Post add an element suggested by Heston, the Alpha Omega doomsday bomb, to end the series. However, before the film's release, the producers were considering ideas for another sequel.

=== Filming ===
Production began in February 1969. The sequel, now titled Beneath the Planet of the Apes, had its budget reduced from $5 million to $2.5 million because Fox had suffered recently from several underperforming big-budget films, like Star!, Hello, Dolly! and Tora! Tora! Tora! Nonetheless, the studio expected the film to return Fox to profitability. Heston's parts were filmed in just eight days. The sets of the mutants' council chamber and the temple of the bomb were redresses of the Grand Central – 42nd Street station and Harmonia Gardens sets from the film Hello, Dolly!

=== Music ===
The original Apes composer, Jerry Goldsmith, was invited to write the score for the sequel, but Schaffner was using Goldsmith for Patton. Leonard Rosenman was hired to compose the score. Rosenman tried to blend Goldsmith's distinctive score with his own style, showcased in productions such as Fantastic Voyage. An official soundtrack LP was issued on the Amos Records label soon after the film's debut in 1970. For the LP, Rosenman was asked to rearrange his score for a smaller orchestra, adding contemporary elements such as electric guitar and rock percussion. These re-recorded pieces were interspersed with dialogue taken from the film. The soundtrack featured some of the leading Los Angeles studio musicians of the time, including bassist Carol Kaye and Moog pioneer Paul Beaver.

A short sequence of diegetic music features in the scene set in the ruins of St. Patrick's Cathedral, in which the telepaths are heard singing a dystopian hymn in praise of the atom bomb. For this scene, Rosenman composed a discordant setting of Cecil Frances Alexander's 1848 Christian hymn "All Things Bright and Beautiful", with the lyrics altered to pay homage to the "Bomb Almighty".

== Novelization ==
The novelization of the film by Michael Avallone retained the original scripted ending. Brent does not kill General Ursus. Taylor confronts him and Dr. Zaius. As Taylor tries to reason with Zaius, Zaius condemns him and Ursus repeatedly shoots Taylor with his pistol; Brent's rifle empties and the gorillas kill him. Ursus is horrified, telling Zaius that he has emptied the pistol into Taylor; he should be dead, but he still lives. Knowing he is dying, Taylor (after Zaius refuses to help him) decides to stop the violence by detonating the bomb. This he does, destroying the Earth itself.

== Comic book adaptations ==
Gold Key Comics produced an adaptation of Beneath the Planet of the Apes in 1970. This was the first comics publication in the Planet of the Apes franchise. Later, Marvel Comics published a different version in two series (b/w magazine 1974–77, color comic book 1975-76). Malibu Comics reprinted the Marvel adaptations when they had the license in the early 1990s.

In 2015 IDW Publishing produced a mini series called Planet of the Apes - The Primate Directive where the crew of the TOS Enterprise followed a Klingon ship into the universe of Beneath the Planet of the Apes which the Klingons are trying to use as a way to get around the Organian Treaty by expanding their empire into another universe. Both crews of the Enterprise and Klingon ship become behind the scenes characters in the events of Beneath the Planet of the Apes. A tricorder with the sling-shot effect is left behind and is used by Dr. Milo to allow the spaceship he, Cornelius, and Zira are in to travel back through time.

== Release ==
The film opened May 26, 1970 at Loew's Beverly Theatre in Los Angeles and opened two days later at Loew's State II and Loew's Orpheum theatres in New York and a day later at the Roosevelt Theatre in Chicago. The film was a surprise runaway success and a sequel was rushed into production. The film grossed $250,000 in its opening week from 4 theaters finishing 9th at the US box office. It reached number one in its sixth week of release with a gross of $863,500. It grossed $19 million at the U.S. and Canadian box office. According to Fox records the film required $8,100,000 in theatrical rentals to break even and by 11 December 1970 had made worldwide rentals of $13,825,000 so made a profit for the studio.

== Reception ==
A. H. Weiler of The New York Times wrote that the film was "proof, in living color, that Heston is vulnerable and that a sequel to striking science fiction can be pretty juvenile." Variety panned the film as "hokey and slapdash," adding, "The dialog, acting and direction are substandard." Gene Siskel of the Chicago Tribune gave the film two stars out of four:

Missing from the sequel is much of the droll humor of the original as well as the adventure. It was a gross error to try to give the series a moral.

Kevin Thomas of the Los Angeles Times called it a "striking, imaginative picture," adding, "Director Ted Post, writers Mort Abrahams and Paul Dehn are to be congratulated for sounding so timely a toll of doom in such an entertaining context." Gary Arnold of The Washington Post wrote that the film was:

...inferior in every respect to its predecessor—a condition common to virtually every sequel in movie history—but it's reasonably entertaining and fast-moving, a good enough Saturday matinee kind of movie.

The Monthly Film Bulletin declared:

Certainly it's nice to see some of the magnificent settings again, and most of the acting is of a high standard; but this isn't enough to transcend the script's limitations or the virtual annihilation of the original's deftly constructed atmosphere.

Frederick S. Clarke in Cinefantastique said:

All technical departments are up to the standard of the previous film, and the special effects are much more plentiful. Beneath the Planet of the Apes is the finest film that could possibly be made given Planet of the Apes as a premise. Keep it in that perspective and you’ll enjoy it.

The film holds a 37% rating at the review aggregation website Rotten Tomatoes based on 30 reviews, with an average grade of 5.1 out of 10. The consensus states: "Beneath the Planet of the Apes offers more action than its predecessor -- unfortunately, at the expense of the social subtext that elevates the franchise's best entries." On Metacritic, the film received an average score of 46 out of 100 based on 9 critics, indicating "mixed or average reviews."

== See also ==
- List of American films of 1970
