= Before the Dawn of the Apes =

- Distributed by: 20th Century Fox; Vice Media's Motherboard
- Release date: 2014
- Country: United States
- Language: English

Before the Dawn of the Apes, or simply Before the Dawn, is a series of three 2014 short films produced by 20th Century Fox and Vice Media's Motherboard, which take place after the events of Rise of the Planet of the Apes and before the events of Dawn of the Planet of the Apes.

Spread of Simian Flu: Before the Dawn of the Apes (Year 1) or Quarantine, is the first short film in the series. Directed by Isaiah Seret, the film takes place during the first year of the Simian Flu outbreak. It features a father and his daughter, who learn to survive after the mother is infected with the Simian Flu, forcing her to quarantine.

Struggling to Survive: Before the Dawn of the Apes (Year 5) or All Fall Down, is the second short film in the series. Directed by Daniel Thron, the film takes place during the fifth year of the Simian Flu outbreak. By now, the majority of humans have died from the Simian Flu. It features an orphan teenage girl who takes items and supplies from abandoned houses and trades them with other people to survive. She also tries to control her fear in response to the world becoming more dangerous.

Story of the Gun: Before the Dawn of the Apes (Year 10) or The Gun, is the third short film in the series. Directed by Dylan Southern and Will Lovelace, the film features a shotgun, whose ownership changes several times over the course of ten years during the Simian Flu outbreak, with all of the owners following an ill-fated path. Ten years after the initial outbreak, human society has collapsed.
