= Revenge of the Apes =

- Developers: 20th Century Fox; Retrodesign
- Publisher: Retrodesign
- Designer: John Marvin
- Platform: Atari 2600
- Release: 2003
- Genre: Action-adventure
- Mode: Single-player

Revenge of the Apes (originally intended to be released as Planet of the Apes) is a video game originally developed in 1983 by 20th Century Fox for the Atari 2600. Planned as the Planet of the Apes franchise's first video game, it was still in the prototype phase when Fox shuttered its game division during the video game crash of 1983. It went unreleased and was assumed lost until 2002, when collectors identified a mislabeled cartridge as the missing Planet of the Apes game. It was completed and released as Revenge of the Apes by Retrodesign in 2003.

== Gameplay ==
Revenge of the Apes on Atari 2600

The player controls Taylor, the protagonist of the 1968 film Planet of the Apes, through several environments inspired by the film: a forest, a river, the ape village, a desert, and caverns. Obstacles include three types of apes: harmless chimpanzees; orangutans, who inflict damage and imprison Taylor in the ape village if they touch him; and gorillas, who inflict more damage, fire projectiles, and also imprison Taylor. The action button fires Taylor's gun and allows him to escape the ape village cage and pits. Counters at the top of the screen track Taylor's life, which decreases with damage, and his limited number of escapes. Players beat the game by navigating to the last board: a ruined Statue of Liberty, as seen in the film. Upon completion, the game restarts with a higher difficulty setting.

== Development and history ==
20th Century Fox commenced work on what it planned to be the first ever Planet of the Apes video game in 1983. The game was developed for the Atari 2600; John Marvin served as programmer. Marvin completed enough of the work to bring the prototype game through initial playtesting, but he left Fox for a new job at Epyx before finishing the project. The game remained unfinished when Fox closed its video game division three months later amid the video game crash of 1983, and Planet of the Apes never saw release.

The game was thought to be lost until the 1990s when collectors found a copy of the Planet of the Apes prototype in a case labeled Alligator People, another abandoned Fox game. They initially assumed the game was in fact Alligator People due to the labeling and the lack of solid information about either title. In 2002, a genuine copy of Alligator People was located, leading to speculation about what the previously found game could be. Collector Matt Reichert's research established that the game was actually John Marvin's lost Planet of the Apes, which had apparently been stored in the wrong case. In 2003, independent designers Retrodesign completed and published the game under the title Revenge of the Apes. Additions included a soundtrack and an updated Statue of Liberty ending.

== Reception ==
Video game writer Brett Weiss wrote that the game is fairly generic, but of interest to Planet of the Apes fans. Earl Green of Allgame stated that "gameplay is a bit less than thrilling, but graphics are adequate," and noted that additional features would likely have been added had production continued on the prototype.
