= Claudette Nevins =

American actress (1937–2020)

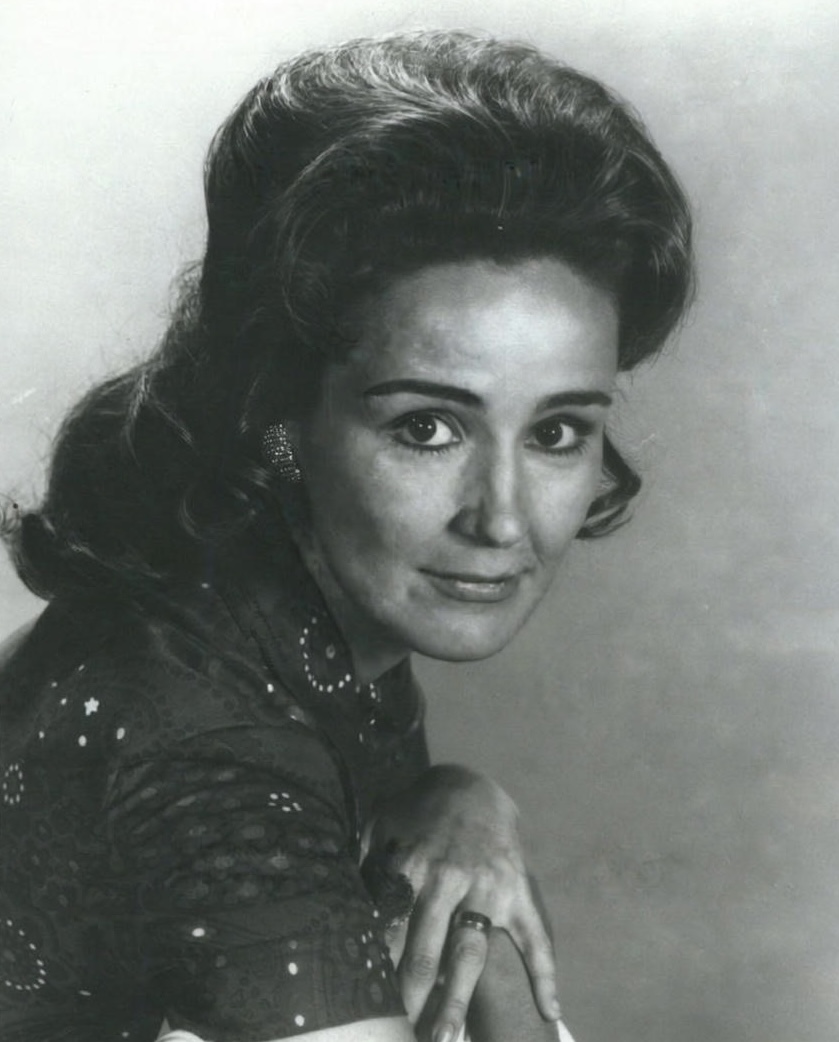
- Nevins in Headmaster, 1970
- Born: Claudette Weintraub; April 10, 1937; Wilkes-Barre, Pennsylvania, U.S.
- Died: February 20, 2020 (aged 82); Los Angeles, California, U.S.
- Education: New York University
- Occupation: Actress
- Years active: 1959–2005
- Spouses: Elliot Nevins; Benjamin L. Pick
- Children: 2

Claudette Nevins (née Weintraub; April 10, 1937 – February 20, 2020) was an American stage, film and television actress.

== Biography ==
Claudette Nevins was born in Wilkes-Barre, Pennsylvania, and grew up in Brooklyn, New York. She was a daughter of merchant Joseph Weintraub and garment worker Anna Lander, both of whom emigrated from small towns in Austria to America. Nevins was a graduate of the Fiorello H. LaGuardia School of Performing Arts and a 1957 Phi Beta Kappa graduate of New York University, with a degree in English.

Nevins debuted on Broadway in The Wall (1960) with other Broadway appearances including Plaza Suite (1968) and Danton's Death (1965). She also appeared in In White America (off-Broadway) with Gloria Foster and Moses Gunn.

The National Company of The Great White Hope, in which she starred with Brock Peters, took her to Los Angeles, after which she began working in television. For two and a half years she was seen in the long-running daytime soap opera Love of Life playing Laurie Krakauer. She appeared as a series regular in Headmaster (opposite Andy Griffith), Husbands, Wives, and Lovers, and Married: the First Year (a David Jacobs project). Her guest star appearances include Beverly Hills 90210, Barnaby Jones, Melrose Place, JAG, Three's Company, Lou Grant, Without a Trace, M*A*S*H, Hart to Hart, Trial and Error, and many others.

Her first film was the 1961 3D feature The Mask, which later became a cult classic. Other feature film appearances include Sleeping With the Enemy (with Julia Roberts), All the Marbles (with Peter Falk), and Tuff Turf (with James Spader).

Her work in regional theaters included the following: Arena Stage; Major Barbara, The Iceman Cometh, Ring Round the Moon, The Cherry Orchard with the Atlanta Repertory; King Arther, The Hostage, The Little Foxes, Major Barbara, The Homecoming, You Can't Take It With You, Twelfth Night, and with LA Shakespeare; Comedy of Errors; La Mirada: Blithe Spirit.

Nevins was a member of the Matrix Theatre Company, where she appeared in Alan Bennett's Habeas Corpus, J. B. Priestley's Dangerous Corner, Caryl Churchill's Mad Forest, and The Water Children. Other stage appearances in Los Angeles include Passion Play (Taper), Isn't it Romantic? (Pasadena), P.S. Your Cat is Dead (Westwood) and Philadelphia Story (Court).

She was a member of the Antaeus Company and with them has done staged readings of Noël Coward's Hay Fever, O'Neill's Long Day's Journey into Night, and Shakespeare's Richard III and King John.

In addition, she had extensive on-camera and voice-over commercial credits.

== Personal life ==
Nevins married Benjamin L. Pick, with whom she had two daughters, Jessica and Sabrina. Nevins died February 20, 2020, in hospice care at her home in Los Angeles.

== Selected filmography ==
=== Film ===
- 1961: The Mask .... Pam Albright
- 1981: All the Marbles .... Solly
- 1982: The American Adventure .... Mother (voice)
- 1983: Over Here, Mr. President .... Maggie Bohanon
- 1985: Tuff Turf .... Page Hiller
- 1987: Jake's M.O. .... Sigournet Tompkins
- 1991: Sleeping with the Enemy .... Dr. Rissner
- 1996: Final Vendetta .... Dr. Lisa Farrow
- 1997: The Doyles
- 1998: Star Trek: Insurrection .... Son'a Officer #2
- 2000: Aladdin and the Adventure of All Time .... (voice)
- 2004: Eulogy .... Barbara Collins

=== Television series ===
- 1964: The Nurses .... Grace Kearney
- 1965: The Defenders .... Ruth Parker
- 1970: Headmaster .... Margaret Thompson
- 1972: The F.B.I.
- 1973: The Bob Newhart Show
- 1973–1974: Police Story .... Ellen Calabrese
- 1974: Mrs. Sundance (TV Movie) .... Mary Lant
- 1974: The Magician .... Suzanne
- 1974–1980: Barnaby Jones .... Anita Parks / Pat Runkle / Claudia Elwood / Francis Yeager / Lisa Howard
- 1975: Harry O .... Jessica Shannon / Margin Wayne
- 1975: Guilty or Innocent: The Sam Sheppard Murder Case (TV Movie) .... Marilyn Sheppard
- 1975: Return to the Planet of the Apes .... Nova / Judy Franklin
- 1976: The Dark Side of Innocence (TV movie) .... Maggie Hancock
- 1976: Rich Man, Poor Man Book II .... Mrs. Martindale
- 1976: Electra Woman and Dyna Girl .... Empress of Evil
- 1976–1978: Switch .... Alice / Genevieve
- 1977: The Possessed (TV Movie) .... Ellen Summer
- 1977: The Rockford Files .... Ann Louise Clement
- 1977: Lou Grant .... Irene Mott
- 1978: Barnaby Jones .... Pat Reed
- 1978: Husbands, Wives & Lovers .... Courtney Fielding
- 1979: The Lazarus Syndrome
- 1979: Three's Company .... Barbara
- 1979: Married: The First Year .... Barbara Huffman
- 1979: Mrs. Columbo .... Sybil
- 1979: M*A*S*H .... Donna Marie Parker
- 1980: Knots Landing .... Susan Philby
- 1980: Family .... Claire Hopkins
- 1981: Behind the Screen .... Angela Aries
- 1981: Hart to Hart .... Señora Piranda
- 1981: Jacqueline Bouvier Kennedy (TV Movie) .... Janet Bouvier Auchincloss
- 1981: CHiPs .... Hannah Chadway
- 1982: Police Squad! .... Veronica Rivers
- 1982: Magnum, P.I. .... Phyllis Reardon
- 1982: Don't Go to Sleep (TV Movie) .... Dr. Robin Samuel
- 1984: Steambath .... Dr. Blossom Jennings
- 1982–1983: One Day at a Time .... Marge
- 1986: Hardcastle and McCormick .... Judge Sheila Mooney
- 1987: The Tortellis .... The Arbiter
- 1987: Hotel .... Myrna Dawson
- 1988: Head of the Class .... Mrs. Samuels
- 1988: L.A. Law .... Sarah Schindler
- 1989: Free Spirit .... Mildred Crater
- 1990: Dallas .... Lizzie Burns
- 1991: Designing Women .... Roseland Price
- 1991: Child of Darkness, Child of Light (TV Movie) .... Lenore Beavier
- 1991: Dead Silence (TV Movie) .... Mrs. Stillman
- 1992–1998: Melrose Place .... Constance Fielding
- 1993: Picket Fences .... Claudia Graham
- 1993: Beverly Hills, 90210 .... Vivian Carson
- 1994: Lois & Clark: The New Adventures of Superman .... Barbara Trevino
- 1994: Thunder Alley .... Ellen
- 1995: Coach .... Mrs. DiMateo
- 1996: ER .... Judge
- 1997: 7th Heaven .... Mrs. Rainy
- 1997–2004: JAG .... Porter Webb
- 1998: Ally McBeal .... Mrs. Hollings
- 2000: Judging Amy .... Karen Cassidy
- 2000: The District .... Judge Arlene Sidwell
- 2001–2002: Providence .... Joyce Sidwell
- 2001–2002: The Agency .... Audrey Simmons
- 2004: Without a Trace .... Cathy Payton
- 2005: Strong Medicine .... Ava Rey (final appearance)
