= Mort Abrahams =

American television producer

- Born: March 26, 1916; New York
- Died: May 28, 2009 (aged 93); Sherman Oaks, California
- Occupation: Film producer
- Spouse: Dorothy Abrahams
- Children: Marjie Abrahams, Joel Abrahams

Mort Abrahams (26 March 1916 – 28 May 2009) was an American film and television producer. Among his credits are nine episodes of spy series The Man from U.N.C.L.E. and, as associate producer, the films Doctor Dolittle, Planet of the Apes, Goodbye, Mr. Chips and Beneath the Planet of the Apes, co-writing the story of the latter.

== Biography ==
Abrahams was the son of a stockbroker. His interest in film was piqued while he worked at Bank of America that tasked him to try and sell several unsuccessful films that the bank had invested in to the television market. He began his career by producing several early science fiction series: Tom Corbett, Space Cadet (1950–55) and Tales of Tomorrow (1951-53); and then a live anthology series for General Electric Theater (1954–55) which included actors James Dean and Natalie Wood.

As a producer at Music Corporation of America in the 1950s, Abrahams was an executive producer on early TV shows including "Suspicion," "Kraft Suspense Theatre" and "G.E. Theatre," hosted by Ronald Reagan.

For Herbert B. Leonard Prods. and ABC, he produced the on-the-road adventure "Route 66" in 1962–63 and the spy-themed "U.N.C.L.E." in 1964–65. From 1969–71, he was vice president in charge of production at Ray Stark's Rastar Prods., which during his tenure produced 1970's "The Owl and the Pussycat." Abrahams joined the American Film Theatre company in 1972 as an executive, and he closed production on eight films – including John Frankenheimer's "Iceman" and the Katharine Hepburn-starring "A Delicate Balance" – in a span of 10 months.

In the 1980s, Abrahams worked on telefilms, including "Separate Tables" starring Julie Christie and "The Arch of Triumph" starring Anthony Hopkins. He worked as vp production in 1986 for World Media Prods. He later worked as producer-in-residence for the Center for Advanced Film and Television at the AFI, serving from 1989 to 1994.

== Personal life ==
Abrahams was married to his college sweetheart Dorothy Abrahams; they had two children. He was pre-deceased by his son. Among his survivors is his daughter, Marjie Abrahams of RSA Films.
