= Pierre Boulle =

French novelist (1912–1994)

- Born: Pierre François Marie Louis Boulle; 20 February 1912; Avignon, France
- Died: 30 January 1994 (aged 81); Paris, France
- Occupation: Author
- Writing career
- Period: 1950–1992
- Notable works: The Bridge over the River Kwai; Planet of the Apes

Pierre François Marie Louis Boulle (20 February 1912 – 30 January 1994) was a French author. He is best known for two works, The Bridge over the River Kwai (1952) and Planet of the Apes (1963), that were both made into award-winning films.

Boulle was an engineer serving as a secret agent with the Free French in Southeast Asia, when he was captured and imprisoned for two years. These experiences inspired The Bridge over the River Kwai, about the notorious Death Railway, which became an international bestseller. The film, named The Bridge on the River Kwai, by David Lean won seven Academy Awards (including Best Adapted Screenplay), and Boulle was credited with writing the screenplay, because its two actual screenwriters had been blacklisted.

His science-fiction novel Planet of the Apes, in which intelligent apes gain mastery over humans, developed into a media franchise spanning over 55 years that includes ten films, two television series, comic books and popular themed merchandise.

== Life and career ==
Born in Avignon, France, Pierre Boulle was baptised and raised as a Catholic, although later in life he became an agnostic. He studied at the prestigious École supérieure d'électricité (Supélec) where he received a degree in engineering in 1933. From 1936 to 1939, he worked as a technician at SOCFIN rubber plantations in Malaya. Boulle met a Frenchwoman at a dinner held at his supervisor's residence, The White Palace, who was separated from her husband. She was soon to become the love of his life, to whom he would write tender love letters. She later chose to return to her husband, an official in French Indochina. During World War II she and her husband escaped into Malaya, but one of her children died in the process. Boulle would later meet her after the war, and they enjoyed a platonic friendship.

At the outbreak of World War II, Boulle enlisted with the French army in Indochina. After German troops occupied France, he became a supporter of Charles de Gaulle and joined the Free French Mission in Singapore. Boulle served as a secret agent under the name Peter John Rule and was sent on a mission to help resistance movements in China, Burma, and French Indochina. In 1943, he was captured by Vichy France loyalists on the Mekong River. Two years later, Boulle managed to escape from Saigon.

Boulle was later made a chevalier of the Légion d'Honneur and decorated with the Croix de Guerre and the Médaille de la Résistance. He described his war experiences in the non-fiction My Own River Kwai. After the war he kept in touch with his war comrades for the rest of his life.

After the war, Boulle returned to work for a while in the plantations of SOCFIN in Malaya. In 1949 he moved back to Paris and began to write, drawing from his memories of Malaya and Indochina. While in Paris, too poor to afford his own flat, he lived in a hotel until his recently widowed sister, Madeleine Perrusset, allowed him to move into her large apartment. She had a daughter, Françoise, whom Pierre helped raise, but plans for him to officially adopt the girl never materialized.

== The Bridge over the River Kwai ==
While in Paris, Boulle used his war experiences in writing Le Pont de la rivière Kwaï (1952; The Bridge over the River Kwai), which became a multi-million-copy worldwide bestseller, winning the French "Prix Sainte-Beuve". The book was a semi-fictional story based on the real plight of Allied POWs forced to build a 415 km (258 mi) railway that passed over the bridge, and which became known as the "Death Railway". 16,000 prisoners and 100,000 Asian conscripts died during construction of the line. His character of Lt-Col. Nicholson was not based on the real Allied senior officer at the Kwai bridges, Philip Toosey, but was reportedly an amalgam of his memories of collaborating French officers. Both the book and film outraged former prisoners because Toosey did not collaborate with the enemy, unlike the fictional Colonel Nicholson. Boulle outlined the reasoning which led him to conceive the character of Nicholson in an interview which forms part of the 1969 BBC2 documentary Return to the River Kwai made by former POW John Coast. A transcript of the interview and the documentary as a whole can be found in the new edition of John Coast's book Railroad of Death.

David Lean made the book into a motion picture that won seven 1957 Academy Awards, including the Best Picture, and Best Actor for Alec Guinness. Boulle himself won the award for Best Adapted Screenplay despite not having written the screenplay and, by his own admission, not even speaking English. Boulle had been credited with the screenplay because the film's actual screenwriters, Carl Foreman and Michael Wilson, had been blacklisted as communist sympathizers. The Motion Picture Academy added Foreman's and Wilson's names to the award in 1984.

Kim Novak accepted the Oscar on behalf of Pierre Boulle.

== Planet of the Apes ==
In 1963, following several other reasonably successful novels, Boulle published his other famous novel, La planète des singes, translated in 1964 as Monkey Planet by Xan Fielding, and later re-issued as Planet of the Apes. With inspiration drawn from observing the wildlife from his years in the plantations in Malaya, the book was highly praised and given such reviews as this example from England's Guardian newspaper: "Classic science fiction ... full of suspense and satirical intelligence." In the year 2500, a group of astronauts, including journalist Ulysse Mérou, voyage to a planet in the star system of Betelgeuse. They land to discover a bizarre world where intelligent apes are the Master Race and humans are reduced to savages: caged in zoos, used in laboratory experiments and hunted for sport. The story focuses on Ulysse's capture, his struggle to survive, and the shattering climax as he returns to Earth and a horrific final discovery. The novel is also a wry parable on science, evolution, and the relationship between man and animal.

In 1968, the book was made into an Oscar-winning film, directed by Franklin J. Schaffner and starring Charlton Heston. The screenplay, originally written by Rod Serling, focused more on action and deviated in many ways from the novel, including the addition of its own classic twist ending that was different from the novel's. It inspired four sequels, a television series, an animated series, a 2001 remake of the original title by Tim Burton, and a 2011 reboot, Rise of the Planet of the Apes, directed by Rupert Wyatt.

The five films of the original series (1968–1973) have become cult classics. Boulle, who had thought his novel to be unfilmable, was taken by surprise at the worldwide success and impact of the film. He wrote a script for a sequel titled Planet of the Men, but the producers of the original film turned it down. The second film, Beneath the Planet of the Apes, which came out in 1970, was also very successful. It was followed by Escape from the Planet of the Apes in 1971, Conquest of the Planet of the Apes in 1972, and Battle for the Planet of the Apes in 1973.

In September 1973, the original film was first aired on network television. The marketing of toys and other products relating to the film series skyrocketed at this time, creating an 'Apemania' craze. In June 1974, Marvel Comics also released a magazine based on the novel and film called Planet of the Apes. By September 1974, Planet of the Apes had become a television series. In 1975, an animated Return to the Planet of the Apes series was shown on television.

== Other adaptations ==
The French film Le Point de mire, based on Boulle's novel Le Photographe, was released in 1977. There have also been TV films based on Boulle's novels William Conrad in 1958 (US) and 1973 (France), La Face in 1959 (US) and 1966 (West Germany), and Un Métier de Seigneur in 1986 (France), as well as the short story "Le Miracle" (from E=mc^{2}) in 1985 (US).

Another film adaptation is in production for Boulle's A Noble Profession (Un Métier de Seigneur), a spy thriller partly based on Boulle's real-life experience working as a secret agent during the Second World War. The movie is being produced by Tessa Bell and Andrea Chung.

== Death ==
Boulle died in Paris, on 30 January 1994, at the age of 81.

== Works ==
=== Novels ===
- William Conrad (1950; tr. in 1955 as Not the Glory by Xan Fielding; also issued as Spy Converted)
- Le Sacrilège malais (1951; tr. in 1959 as Sacrilege in Malaya by Xan Fielding; also issued as S.O.P.H.I.A.)
- Le Pont de la rivière Kwaï (1952; tr. in 1954 as The Bridge over the River Kwai by Xan Fielding)
- Le Bourreau (1954; tr. in 1961 by Xan Fielding, US title: The Executioner, UK title: The Chinese Executioner)
- L'Épreuve des hommes blancs (1955; tr. in 1957 as The Test by Xan Fielding; also issued as White Man's Test)
- La Face (1956; tr. in 1956 as Saving Face by Xan Fielding; also issued as Face of a Hero)
- Les Voies du salut (1958; tr. in 1958 as The Other Side of the Coin by Richard Howard)
- Un métier de seigneur (1960; tr. in 1960 as A Noble Profession by Xan Fielding; also issued as For a Noble Cause)
- La Planète des singes (1963; tr. in 1964 as Monkey Planet by Xan Fielding; later issued as Planet of the Apes)
- Le Jardin de Kanashima (1964; tr. in 1965 as Garden on the Moon by Xan Fielding)
- Le Photographe (1967; tr. in 1967 by Xan Fielding, US title: The Photographer, UK title: An Impartial Eye)
- Les Jeux de l'esprit (1971; tr. in 1973 as Desperate Games by Patricia Wolf)
- Les Oreilles de jungle (1972; tr. in 1972 as Ears of the Jungle by Michael Dobry and Lynda Cole) - story of the Vietnam war told from the perspective of a North Vietnamese commander
- Les Vertus de l'enfer (1974; tr. in 1974 as The Virtues of Hell by Patricia Wolf)
- Le Bon Léviathan (1978; tr. in 1978 as The Good Leviathan by Margaret Giovanelli)
- Les Coulisses du Ciel (1979; tr. in 1985 as Trouble in Paradise by Patricia Wolf)
- L'Énergie du désespoir (1981)
- Miroitements (1982; tr. in 1986 as Mirrors of the Sun by Patricia Wolf)
- La Baleine des Malouines (1983; tr. in 1984 by Patricia Wolf, US title: The Whale of the Victoria Cross, UK title: The Falklands Whale)
- Pour l'amour de l'art (1985)
- Le Professeur Mortimer (1988)
- Le Malheur des uns... (1990)
- À nous deux, Satan ! (1992)
- L'Archéologue et le Mystère de Néfertiti (2005; posthumous)

=== Short story collections ===
- Contes de l'absurde (1953)
- E=mc^{2} (1957)
- Histoires charitables (1965)
- Time Out of Mind: And Other Stories (1966; twelve stories from Boulle's first three collections tr. by Xan Fielding and Elisabeth Abbott)
- Quia absurdum: sur la Terre comme au Ciel (1966; tr. in 1970 as Because It Is Absurd: On Earth as It Is in Heaven by Elisabeth Abbott)
- Histoires perfides (1976; tr. in 1977 as The Marvelous Palace And Other Stories by Margaret Giovanelli)
- L'Enlèvement de l'obélisque (2007; posthumous)

=== Non-fiction ===
- Le Siam (Walt Disney) (1955; tr. in 1958 as Walt Disney's Siam by Herbert Knapp)—in Walt Disney's "Le Monde et ses habitants"/"The World and its Inhabitants" series
- L'étrange croisade de l'empereur Frédéric II (1963)
- Aux sources de la rivière Kwaï (1966; tr. in 1967 by Xan Fielding, US title: My Own River Kwai, UK title: The Source of the River Kwai)—memoir
- L'univers ondoyant (1987)
- L'îlon (1990)—memoir
