= Planet of the Apes (novel) =

1963 French novel by Pierre Boulle

- First edition cover
- Author: Pierre Boulle
- Original title: La Planète des singes
- Translator: Xan Fielding
- Language: French
- Genre: Science fiction
- Publisher: Éditions Julliard
- Publication date: 1963
- Publication place: France
- Media type: Print (hardback and paperback)

La Planète des singes, published in English as Planet of the Apes in the U.S. and Monkey Planet in the UK, is a 1963 science fiction novel by French author Pierre Boulle. It was adapted into the 1968 film Planet of the Apes, launching the Planet of the Apes media franchise.

The novel tells the tale of three human explorers from Earth who visit a planet orbiting the star Betelgeuse, in which great apes are the dominant intelligent and civilized species, whereas humans are reduced to a savage animal-like state.

== Plot ==
In a frame story, a rich couple sailing in space, Jinn and Phyllis, rescue and translate a manuscript from a floating bottle.

The manuscript was written by Ulysse Mérou, a French journalist who, in 2500, was invited by Professor Antelle to accompany him and his disciple, physician Arthur Levain, to Betelgeuse. Because of time dilation, centuries pass on Earth during their two years in transit. They land their shuttle on a temperate, lushly forested planet which they name Soror (Latin for sister). Attracted by a naked "golden" woman whom they call Nova, they swim below a waterfall. She is frightened by their pet chimpanzee, Hector, and strangles it. Her tribe, who exhibit the behavior of dumb animals, wreck the newcomers' clothing and shuttle.

Gorillas, dressed as big-game hunters, attack the tribe with firearms. Many are killed including Arthur. Ulysse is captured and brought to a city populated by apes. The apes smoke tobacco, photograph their hunting trophies, drink through straws, and appear civilized. Their society is divided into three strata: militaristic gorillas as police and soldiers, conservative orangutans as politicians and religious authorities, and liberal chimpanzees as scientists.

In an urban biological research facility, Ulysse recognizes conditioning methods being used on captured humans. He is mated with Nova. Curious chimpanzee researcher Zira takes an interest in his geometric drawings and his ability to speak a few simian words. With help from Zira's fiancé, Cornélius, Ulysse makes a speech in front of several thousand apes. He is granted freedom, social prestige, and tailored clothing. Antelle reverts to primitive humanity in the zoo and is moved to the laboratory for safety, where he is mated to a young female.

Cornélius, an archaeologist, excavates an ancient human city and invites Ulysse. An unconscious human lab subject recites from genetic memory the events that led to the fall of human civilization: humans tamed apes and used them as servants. As apes learned to talk, a cerebral laziness took hold of the humans. Apes took over human homes, driving the humans into camps outside of the cities. In the final memory, apes attacked the last human camp.

Nova bears Ulysse a son named Sirius who walks and talks at three months. Fearing for their lives, they take the place of the human test subjects in a space flight experiment. Because all humans look alike to apes, Ulysse and Nova escape without notice and rendezvous with the orbiting ship. Ulysse programs the ship back to Earth. As they fly over Paris, Orly Airport and the Eiffel Tower look the same. When they land, however, they are greeted by a field officer in a jeep who is a gorilla. Horrified, Ulysse and Nova take off in their ship, leaving Earth behind. Ulysse then writes his manuscript as a record of what has happened, places it in a bottle, and casts it into space.

In the frame story, it is revealed that Jinn and Phyllis are chimpanzees. They discard Ulysse's story as fantasy because they find the idea of intelligent humans unbelievable.

== Publication history ==
The novel was published in France in 1963 by Éditions Julliard.

The first English language version, with a translation by Xan Fielding, was published in the United States by Vanguard Press in June 1963 under the title Planet of the Apes.

In January 1964, it was published in the United Kingdom as Monkey Planet by Secker & Warburg of London, then re-issued as Planet of the Apes in August 1973 to tie it in to the film franchise it inspired.

The first paperback edition was published in the US in March 1964 by Signet / New American Library.

In May 1964, Saga: The Magazine For Men printed an abridged version of the novel.

== Adaptations ==
Following the 1968 film adaptation, the novel was spun off into the titular Planet of the Apes media franchise. An earlier draft of the 1968 film's screenplay, authored by The Twilight Zone creator Rod Serling, more closely adapted the novel in terms of the imagery of the ape society. A comics adaptation of this version appeared as Planet of the Apes: Visionaries.

A second adaptation of the book was released in 2001. In essence, it remade the 1968 film, though the ending of this adaptation more closely reflected the ending of the original novel.

== See also ==
- Ape and Essence
- Genus Homo
- "Living Fossil"
- Les Animaux dénaturés
- "No Connection"
