= Cornelius (Planet of the Apes) =

Fictional character

- Planet of the Apes character
- Roddy McDowall as Cornelius
- First appearance: Planet of the Apes (1968)
- Last appearance: Escape from the Planet of the Apes (1971)
- Created by: Pierre Boulle
- Portrayed by: Roddy McDowall; David Watson (Beneath the Planet of the Apes)

In-universe information
- Species: Evolved chimpanzee
- Occupation: Archeologist; Historian
- Family: Caesar (son)
- Spouse: Zira (wife)

Cornelius is a fictional character in the Planet of the Apes universe. He first appears in Pierre Boulle's novel La Planète des singes, and goes on to appear in the first three films of the franchise: Planet of the Apes (1968), Beneath the Planet of the Apes (1970), and Escape from the Planet of the Apes (1971). He was portrayed by actor Roddy McDowall in the first and third films; owing to McDowall's absence, he was played instead by David Watson in Beneath.

Cornelius is an ape historian, archeologist, and scientist, and the fiancé (later husband) of Zira. He is the inventor of a theory which states that apes evolved from a more primitive species, possibly humans. Along with Zira, he befriends George Taylor, the human astronaut stranded in the future, and later accepts that apes did not evolve from humans. In Beneath the Planet of the Apes, he later befriends Brent, another astronaut who has been sent to rescue Taylor. Later, he, along with Zira and Dr. Milo, find themselves in the 1970s thanks to a time warp after escaping the destruction of Earth in Taylor's spaceship. He is the father of Caesar.

== Background ==
In 1968's Planet of the Apes, Cornelius is introduced as the husband of Dr. Zira, an animal psychologist and veterinarian, both of whom are on the scientific staff of Dr. Zaius. Cornelius begins to question how the ape society began, especially its evolution. Cornelius sees that Taylor is worthy of consideration as an intelligent being. Cornelius and Zira escape with Taylor to the "Forbidden Zone" (a wasteland where humans are said to come from) to a site where Cornelius had been digging the year before. Dr. Zaius pursues them, is captured by Taylor and is forced to accept the evidence for a pre-ape human society. Cornelius accepts that apes did not evolve from humans, and rediscovered the inventions that humans had created. Taylor leaves; the artifacts are destroyed, and Cornelius and Zira return home.

In Beneath the Planet of the Apes, Cornelius and Zira meet another astronaut, Brent, who appears at their doorstep after being shot by a gorilla. Cornelius gives Brent a map leading to where they left Taylor and instructs him not to let other apes hear him speak.

In Escape from the Planet of the Apes, Cornelius and Zira themselves become astronauts, escaping their world in Taylor's spacecraft that was found and restored by their friend Dr Milo, and travelling back in time to roughly 1–3 years after Taylor's departure. They discover a world run by humans and deduce it is their own planet from the apes' prehistory. After being celebrities, the apes are imprisoned and interrogated by the humans. Zira is pregnant and this puts the fear of an ape-run Earth in the humans. Zira gives birth to Milo (renamed Caesar in Conquest of the Planet of the Apes ) and is taken into hiding by Armando, a sympathetic circus owner. After being discovered by Dr. Hasslein, Cornelius and Zira escape with a normal chimpanzee baby, which they had switched with Milo to ensure his safety. All three are killed.

== Behind the scenes ==
Cornelius first appeared in 1963 in Pierre Boulle's novel La Planète des singes (known in English as Planet of the Apes).

During a 1966 makeup test for the original film, actor James Brolin portrayed Cornelius, alongside Linda Harrison (later to play Nova) as Zira and Edward G. Robinson as Dr. Zaius. Actor Roddy McDowall was later cast to play Cornelius in the film.

In 1970, during the filming of the movie's sequel Beneath the Planet of the Apes, McDowall was unavailable to reprise his role as Cornelius, as he was busy directing the film Tam Lin. David Watson was instead cast to portray Cornelius; McDowall still appeared in the film by way of archive footage from the first film played at the beginning. For the next film, 1971's Escape from the Planet of the Apes, McDowall reprised his role. The film sees Cornelius and Zira, along with colleague Dr. Milo, escaping the destruction of Earth in the prior film by travelling back in time to the 1970s in Taylor’s spacecraft. Although Cornelius died at the end of the film, McDowall would go on to play Cornelius’s son, Caesar, in the next two films, Conquest of the Planet of the Apes and Battle for the Planet of the Apes, as well as Galen in the TV series.

== Legacy ==
Cornelius has become one of the most well-known and iconic characters in the Planet of the Apes franchise, and has appeared on much merchandise. Decades later, McDowell said in an interview,

"Cornelius was actually a dull sort of character, though he was stronger in Escape because the film had more humor .... Actually with the first film, Cornelius has very little to do in it. He's more or less a true blue Sam. Zira's a much more electric character. She's the one with the humor and the sort of teasing. I didn't mind that, because as it evolved, when we were doing Planet, the 'total' was the thing that fascinated me. I thought that Frank Schaffner's managing of that film was fantastic. Because, after all, nobody ever tried that before. But to be an actor in the first film was entirely different than being an actor in the third, fourth, and fifth."

He also inspired the later character of Galen in the Planet of the Apes TV series, also played by Roddy McDowall. Caesar, in both Battle for the Planet of the Apes and the reboot trilogy, has a son named Cornelius in honor of McDowall’s character.
