= Natalie Trundy =

American actress (1940–2019)

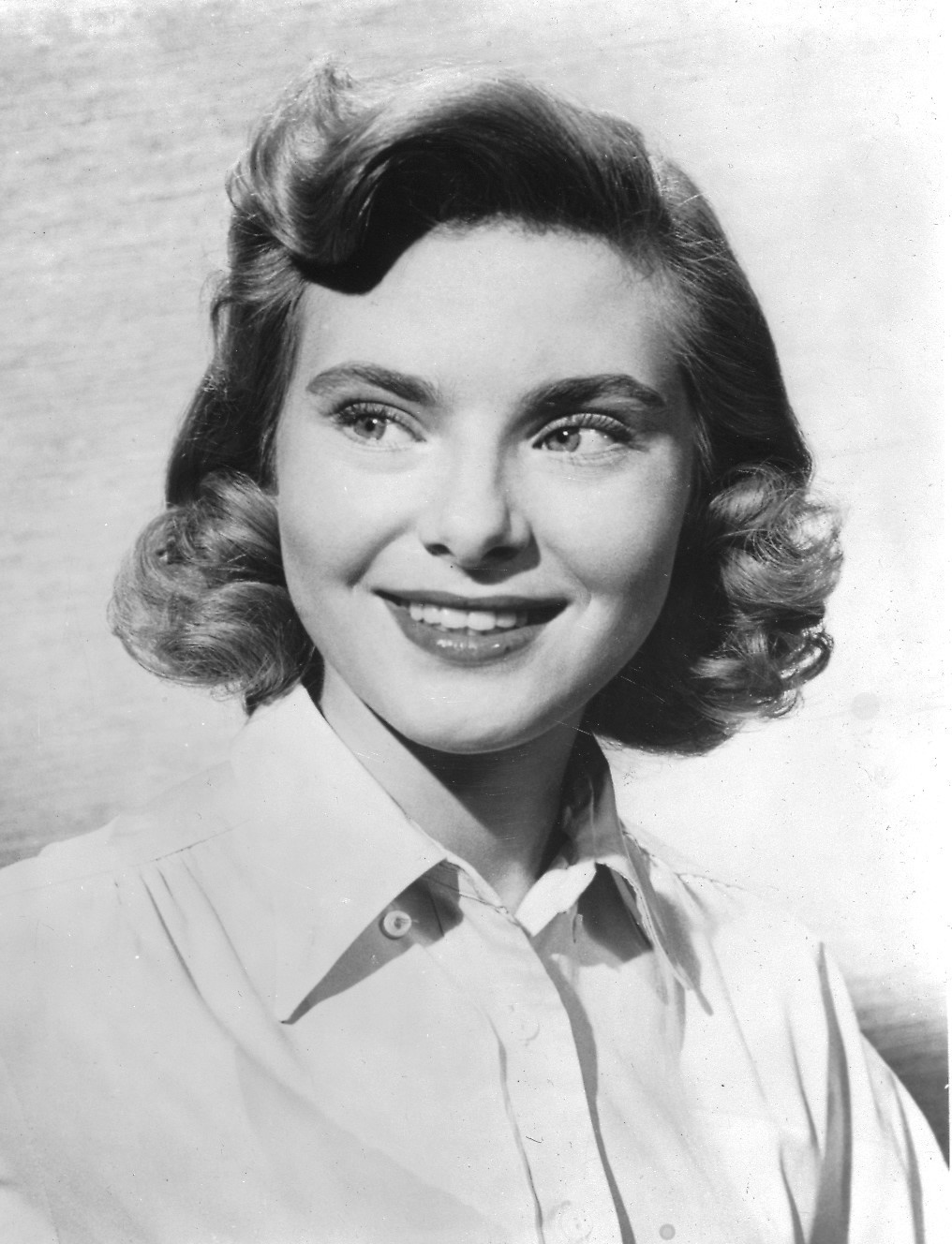
- Born: Natalie Trundy Campagna; August 5, 1940; Boston, Massachusetts, U.S.
- Died: December 5, 2019 (aged 79); Los Angeles, California, U.S.
- Occupation: Actress
- Years active: 1953–1978
- Spouses: Charles H. Hirshon (m. 1959; annul. 1960) Arthur P. Jacobs (m. 1968; died 1973) Carmine Roberto Foggia (m. 1974; div. 1980) Scott Cristle (m. 1982; div. 1984) Andres Lopez (m. 1985)
- Children: 2

Natalie Trundy (born Natalie Trundy Campagna, August 5, 1940 – December 5, 2019) was an American stage, film, and television actress.

== Early years ==
Trundy (pronounced "Troon-dee") was born in Boston, Massachusetts, the daughter of an Italian father, Frank Campagna, and an Irish mother, Natalie (née Trundy) Campagna. Her father was a wealthy insurance executive, and she had a younger sister named Beverly Marie Campagna. When she was young, her father's work resulted in the family moving to New York City, where she attended Marymount School of New York.

== Stage ==
Trundy performed on Broadway when she was 12 years old, earning the role of 15-year-old Nancy in A Girl Can Tell by convincingly (and unknown to the producers) acting older than her true age during the auditions.

== Film ==
As an actress, she starred in the 1962 film Mr. Hobbs Takes a Vacation. In May 1963, she was struck by a car, and suffered a ruptured disc in her back, disrupting the momentum of her acting career as she spent a year recovering in a back brace.

Trundy's second husband Arthur P. Jacobs produced films and television through his APJAC Productions. APJAC produced the original Planet of the Apes movie series. In the early 1970s, Trundy played the telepathic mutant Albina in Beneath the Planet of the Apes, the early 1970s human Dr. Stephanie Branton in Escape from the Planet of the Apes, and featured as the nearer-future chimpanzee Lisa, the mate of Caesar, in both Conquest of the Planet of the Apes and Battle for the Planet of the Apes. Trundy's last film was 1974's Huckleberry Finn, also produced by APJAC Productions.

== Television ==
Newspaper columnist Erskine Johnson once described Trundy as a "sort of electronic Shirley Temple who sparkled on TV between the ages of 11 and 16," adding that she appeared, uncredited, "in nearly 200 live New York TV shows" in those early days of television.

As Trundy and television matured, she made a number of credited appearances in network television series, including the 1960 episode "The Twisted Image" on Thriller, the 1960 episode "Denver McKee" on Bonanza, the 1963 episode "The Case of the Golden Oranges" on Perry Mason, the 1963 episode "Valley of the Shadow" on The Twilight Zone, as well as guest appearances on episodes of The Alfred Hitchcock Hour, The Silent Force and Wagon Train. Trundy last appeared in a 1978 episode of the series Quincy, M.E..

== Producing ==
After her second husband's death in 1973, Trundy assumed control of his company, APJAC Productions.

== Personal life ==
Trundy was married five times. In September 1959, 19-year-old Trundy married 22-year-old trust fund millionaire Charles Hirshon, but the marriage was annulled in 1960. Her second husband was movie producer Arthur P. Jacobs. Trundy had two children (born 1976 and 1977) during her six-year marriage to her third husband Carmine Roberto Foggia. She had a short marriage to Scott Cristle in the early 1980s and married Andres Lopez in 1985.

== Filmography ==
Film
Year	Title	Role	Notes
1956	The Monte Carlo Story	Jane Hinkley	
1957	The Careless Years	Emily 'Miley' Meredith	
1960	Walk Like a Dragon	Mrs. Susan Allen	
1962	Mr. Hobbs Takes a Vacation	Susan Carver	
1970	Beneath the Planet of the Apes	Albina	
1971	Escape from the Planet of the Apes	Dr. Stephanie Branton	
1972	Conquest of the Planet of the Apes	Lisa	
1973	Battle for the Planet of the Apes	Lisa	
1974	Huckleberry Finn	Mrs. Loftus	

== Selected television appearances ==
- The Twilight Zone (1963) (Season 4 Episode 3: "Valley of the Shadow") as Ellen Marshall
- Perry Mason (1963) (Season 6 Episode 20: "The Case of the Golden Oranges") as Sandra Keller
- The Alfred Hitchcock Hour (1963) (Season 1 Episode 25: "The Long Silence") as Jean Dekker
- Perry Mason (1964) (season 7, episode 29): "The Case of the Tandem Target" as Irma Hodge
