= Dr. Maximus =

Dr. Maximus may refer to:

- Dr. Maximus, a character from the Planet of the Apes films
- Ibn Arabi, a 12th Century philosopher known as Doctor Maximus in medieval Europe
