= Tarzan on the Planet of the Apes =

2016 comic book miniseries

Publication information
- Publisher: Boom! Studios
- Format: Ongoing series
- Main character(s): Tarzan; Caesar; Planet of the Apes

Tarzan on the Planet of the Apes is a 2016 comic book miniseries combining the Tarzan and Planet of the Apes media franchises. written by David Walker and Tim Seeley, art by Fernando Dagnino and colour work by Sandra Molina

== Plot ==
In an alternate take on Escape from the Planet of the Apes where Cornelius, Zira and Dr. Milo travel to late-1800s Africa instead of the 1970s, the apes become the leaders of the Mangani and Caesar and Tarzan are raised as brothers. However, as Tarzan grows up and humans arrive in the jungle, they are separated by slave traders. Eventually they reunite when the war between man and ape takes them from the jungles of Africa to the inner earth realm of Pellucidar.

== Reception ==
The series has gained mostly positive critical reviews.

== See also ==
- Tarzan in comics
- Planet of the Apes (comics)
