= Planet of the Apes 4 =

Planet of the Apes 4 may refer to:

- Conquest of the Planet of the Apes (1972), the fourth film in the original Planet of the Apes film series
- Kingdom of the Planet of the Apes (2024), the fourth film in the rebooted film series
