= Arthur P. Jacobs =

American press agent and film producer (1922–1973)

- Born: March 7, 1922; Los Angeles, California, US
- Died: June 27, 1973 (aged 51); Los Angeles, California, US
- Occupation: Film producer
- Spouse: Natalie Trundy (m. 1968)

Arthur P. Jacobs (March 7, 1922 – June 27, 1973) was an American film producer. Prior to being a producer, he worked in various studios and was a press agent. Beginning in 1963 until his death, he was responsible for film productions such as the Planet of the Apes series, Doctor Dolittle, Goodbye, Mr. Chips, Play It Again, Sam and Tom Sawyer through his company APJAC Productions.

== Early life ==
Arthur P. Jacobs was born to a Jewish family in Los Angeles. He lost his father in a car accident in 1940 and his mother to cancer in 1959. Jacobs majored in cinema at the University of Southern California in 1942. Starting as a courier at Metro-Goldwyn-Mayer in 1943, he was promoted to their publicity department before being lured to Warner Bros. as a publicist in 1946. In 1947, he left Warners to open his own public relations office, and in 1956 he formed The Arthur P. Jacobs Co., Inc. Among his clients were Gregory Peck, James Stewart, Judy Garland and Marilyn Monroe.

== Career ==
In 1963, Jacobs formed the feature film production company APJAC Productions, which released its first film, What a Way to Go! through 20th Century-Fox the following year. Jacobs had been able to secure financing for the project on the strength of Fox contract star Monroe's agreement to star in it, but her death in 1962 forced Jacobs to replace her with Shirley MacLaine. What a Way to Go! became one of Fox's highest-grossing releases of 1964, earning Jacobs enough credibility for the studio to finance Doctor Dolittle, ultimately a much-maligned movie that failed both critically and commercially upon its release in 1967. Planet of the Apes, however, became a box office hit in 1968 and spawned four sequels. That same year he married actress Natalie Trundy, who would play various characters in all four sequels.

At the same time, Jacobs's APJAC merged with Jerome Hellman Productions and produced the musical Goodbye, Mr Chips for Jacobs's former employer, MGM. Despite being cheaper and less troublesome to produce than Dr. Dolittle, it, too, went mostly unnoticed at the box office.

According to Trundy, Jacobs stated, "I will never in my lifetime make a film that cannot be seen by the whole family" and gave the rights to Midnight Cowboy to his associate, Jerome Hellman, for no fee, saying, "I will not have my name on it". Midnight Cowboy went on to win the 1969 Academy Award for Best Picture for Hellman.

In 1973, APJAC Productions was renamed APJAC International. Jacobs produced the Reader's Digest-financed Tom Sawyer, a musical which featured both a script and musical score by the Sherman Brothers. It was to be the first in a five-picture deal with the prolific composers. But on June 27, 1973, during production of the second film, Huckleberry Finn, Jacobs died suddenly of a heart attack at the age of 51.

In addition to producing Huckleberry Finn, Jacobs was working on a number of projects at the same time. He had just made a pilot for a TV series, Topper Returns, starring Roddy McDowall, Stefanie Powers and John Randolph; was the Executive Producer of a Planet of the Apes TV series; and was developing a full-length science fiction feature called Voyage of the Oceanauts. He also wanted to produce a film version of the Frank Herbert novel Dune.

Trundy, who was filming Huckleberry Finn on location at the time of her husband's death, assumed control of APJAC Productions. A 1975 article in Planet of the Apes UK stated that APJAC later sold "all rights and privileges" of the Apes adventures to 20th Century-Fox, choosing to concentrate on future projects.

== Filmography ==
- Huckleberry Finn (1974), aka Mark Twain's Huckleberry Finn: A Musical Adaptation (USA: promotional title)
- Battle for the Planet of the Apes (1973)
- Tom Sawyer (1973), aka A Musical Adaptation of Mark Twain's 'Tom Sawyer' (USA: promotional title)
- Conquest of the Planet of the Apes (1972)
- Play It Again, Sam (1972)
- Escape from the Planet of the Apes (1971)
- Beneath the Planet of the Apes (1970)
- Goodbye, Mr. Chips (1969)
- The Chairman (1969)... aka The Most Dangerous Man in the World (UK)
- Planet of the Apes (1968)
- Doctor Dolittle (1967)
- What a Way to Go! (1964)

== Television ==
- Topper Returns (1973) (TV) (executive producer)

== Literature ==
- Hall, Sheldon; Neale, Stephen (2010). Epics, Spectacles, and Blockbusters: A Hollywood History. Detroit: Wayne State University Press. ISBN 978-0-8143-3008-1.
