= Battle for the Planet of the Apes =

1973 film directed by J. Lee Thompson

- Theatrical release poster
- Directed by: J. Lee Thompson
- Screenplay by: John William Corrington; Joyce Hooper Corrington
- Story by: Paul Dehn
- Based on: Characters by Pierre Boulle
- Produced by: Arthur P. Jacobs
- Starring: Roddy McDowall; Claude Akins; Natalie Trundy; Severn Darden; Lew Ayres; Paul Williams; John Huston
- Cinematography: Richard H. Kline
- Edited by: Alan L. Jaggs; John C. Horger
- Music by: Leonard Rosenman
- Production company: APJAC Productions
- Distributed by: 20th Century-Fox
- Release date: June 13, 1973
- Running time: 87 minutes
- Country: United States
- Language: English
- Budget: $1.7 million
- Box office: $8.8 million

Battle for the Planet of the Apes is a 1973 American science fiction film directed by J. Lee Thompson from a screenplay by John William Corrington and Joyce Hooper Corrington, based on a story by Paul Dehn. The film is the sequel to Conquest of the Planet of the Apes (1972) and the fifth and final installment in the original Planet of the Apes film series. It stars Roddy McDowall, Claude Akins, Natalie Trundy, Severn Darden, Lew Ayres, Paul Williams, and John Huston. In the film, after conquering the oppressive humans, Caesar (McDowall) tries to keep the peace amongst the humans and apes, but uprisings endure.

Battle for the Planet of the Apes was released in the United States on June 13, 1973, by 20th Century-Fox. The film received mixed-to-negative reviews from critics, grossing $8.8 million against a budget of nearly $2 million.

== Plot ==
The orangutan Lawgiver, in "North America – 2670 A.D.", (Note: 1,300 years before the events of Planet of the Apes (1968)) explains to an unseen audience some key events of ape and human events in the late 20th century, (Note: The narration includes clips from Escape from the Planet of the Apes (1971) and Conquest of the Planet of the Apes (1972)) then moves forward to the story of the chimpanzee Caesar in the early 21st century, years after a global nuclear war has destroyed human civilization.

Living with his wife, Lisa and their son, Cornelius, Caesar creates a new society while trying to cultivate peace between the apes and remaining humans. Caesar is opposed by an aggressive gorilla general named Aldo, who wants to imprison the humans who freely roam Ape City while doing menial labor.

After defusing followers of Aldo who attacked a human teacher Abe for saying "No" to apes, Caesar wonders if his own parents could have taught him how to make things better. MacDonald, Caesar's human assistant, reveals to Caesar that his older brother (Note: the like-named MacDonald, from Conquest of the Planet of the Apes) told him of archived footage of Cornelius and Zira within the underground, now radioactive ruins of what is known as the Forbidden City from the last film. Caesar travels with MacDonald and his orangutan advisor Virgil to the Forbidden City to find the archives.

It is revealed that mutated and radiation-scarred humans are living within the city, under the command of Governor Kolp, the man who once captured Caesar. Caesar and his party view the recordings of his parents, learning about the future and Earth's eventual destruction before they are forced to flee when Kolp's soldiers hunt them. Fearing the mutant humans may attack Ape City, Caesar reports his discoveries. When Caesar calls MacDonald and a select group of humans to the meeting, Aldo leads the gorillas away.

Kolp's scouts find Ape City. Believing Caesar is planning to finish off all mutant humans, Kolp declares war on Ape City despite his assistant Méndez's attempt to get him to see reason. Aldo plots a coup d'état in order for the gorillas to take control. Cornelius overhears from a nearby tree, but is critically wounded when Aldo spots him and hacks off the tree branch he is on with his sword. The next day, after a gorilla scouting pair are attacked by Kolp's men, Aldo takes advantage of a grieving Caesar's absence to have all humans corralled while looting the armory. Cornelius eventually dies from his wounds, leaving a devastated Caesar with the revelation that Cornelius was not hurt by humans.

When Kolp's ragtag force launches their attack, Caesar orders the defenders to fall back. Finding Caesar lying among dozens of fallen apes, Kolp expresses his intention to personally kill him. The apes, however, are merely feigning death and launch a counterattack that captures most of the mutant humans. Kolp and his remaining forces try to escape, only to be slaughtered by Aldo's troops once they are out in the open.

Aldo confronts Caesar about releasing the corralled local humans and orders the gorillas to kill them. When Caesar shields the humans and Aldo threatens him, Virgil, having learned the truth from MacDonald, reveals Aldo's role in Cornelius's death. Enraged with Aldo for breaking their most sacred law, "ape shall never kill ape", all the apes begin to angrily approach Aldo. Caesar pursues him up a large tree, their confrontation resulting in Aldo falling to his death.

With Caesar now realizing that apes are no different than their former human slaveowners, he agrees to MacDonald's request for humans to be treated as equals, co-existing in a new society. They store their guns in the armory; Caesar and Virgil reluctantly explain to the armory's overseer, an orangutan named Mandemas, that they will still need their weapons for future conflicts and can only wait for the day when they will no longer need them.

The scene returns to the Lawgiver, saying it has now been over 600 years since Caesar's death. His audience is revealed to be a group of young humans and apes, the Lawgiver noting that their society still waits for a day when their world will no longer need weapons, while they "wait with hope". A closeup of a statue of Caesar shows a single tear falling from one eye.

== Cast ==
- Roddy McDowall as Caesar / Cornelius (archive footage) (voice)
- Claude Akins as Aldo
- Natalie Trundy as Lisa
- Severn Darden as Kolp
- Lew Ayres as Mandemus
- Paul Williams as Virgil
- Austin Stoker as MacDonald
- Noah Keen as Abe, Teacher
- Richard Eastham as Mutant Captain
- John Huston as The Lawgiver
- France Nuyen as Alma
- Paul Stevens as Mendez
- Heather Lowe as Doctor
- Bobby Porter as Cornelius
- Michael Stearns as Jake
- Cal Wilson as Soldier
- Pat Cardi as Young Chimp
- John Landis as Jake's Friend
- Eric Braeden as Dr. Otto Hasslein (archive footage) (voice)
- Kim Hunter as Zira (archive footage) (voice)

== Production ==
=== Development ===
Initially, writer Paul Dehn, who had provided the script for every previous sequel, was hired to provide a story treatment for the fifth film in the series. Dehn withdrew from the project prior to completing the screenplay for health reasons. Screenwriters John William Corrington and Joyce Hooper Corrington were brought in after the success of their film The Omega Man, although prior to that, neither one of them had written any science fiction films. Joyce Carrington later admitted they had never seen any of the Apes films prior to being hired to write the script for Battle. Dehn was unavailable for the initial rewrites, but was hired to come in and do a final polish on the script. Dehn was given a story credit despite an appeal to the Writers Guild of America for shared credit on the screenplay. Dehn claimed to have rewritten 90% of the dialogue and he altered the ending. The original script by the Corringtons ended on a playground with ape and human children fighting. Dehn chose to go with a close up of a statue of Caesar with a tear falling from its eye which Joyce Corrington characterized as "...stupid. It turned our stomachs when we saw it." The Writers Guild of America ruled in favor of the Corringtons for sole screenplay credit.

=== Filming ===
Principal photography took place on the Fox Movie Ranch for an estimated budget of $1.7 million. Heading into filming, director J. Lee Thompson was unhappy with both the script and the scope of the production, which he felt could have used a bigger budget to assist in the portrayal of Battle. Thompson had agreed to direct without a script in place and regretted that Paul Dehn could not have been on the project throughout the writing process.

Battle for the Planet of the Apes was the second-to-last film produced by Arthur P. Jacobs. He died June 27, 1973, at age 51, exactly two weeks after its release.

== Extended cut ==
The syndicated television version adds a few scenes cut from the theatrical release. One scene takes place after Aldo chases teacher Abe, where MacDonald reminds him why humans should not say "no" to an ape.

Another scene towards the end of the film shows the beginnings of the House of Mendez cult, as the humans in the city are about to fire off the doomsday bomb (as seen in Beneath the Planet of the Apes), but decide not to, as it would destroy the world. In Beneath, one can see many signs of Mendez in the Forbidden Zone, a hymnal on the pipe organ reading "Mendez II", busts of past leaders of the mutant society (such as Mendez XIV), and the mutant leader in Beneath is also named Mendez. It is clear that Governor Mendez is a different leader than his predecessors, Breck and Kolp, since he is more sympathetic to the apes, as long as they do not invade their territory.

In 2006, the Planet of the Apes movies were re-released separately and in a new box set. This version was earlier released in a Japanese laserdisc boxset. Listed are the additional scenes:

- Near the end of the opening credits, the score continues to its original ending for 25 seconds, with extra footage of General Aldo approaching Ape City on his horse.
- The chase of the teacher of the apes is longer by 20 seconds.
- The mutant chief is walking around in his HQ, and has more dialogue.
- The entry into the ruins of the Forbidden City of the ape scout party with Caesar is 40 seconds longer, with more dialogue.
- The escape from the Forbidden City shows more footage and dialogue involving the apes.
- The scene where Cornelius is "shot" by a human boy begins slightly earlier, making it clear that the shooting is a game – which makes more sense, since no mutant party had yet even approached Ape City.
- DELETED SCENE: In this edited scene, Governor Kolp tells his lieutenant to fire an atomic missile on Ape City when he gives the signal.
- The mutant assault is 45 seconds longer. In this sequence, there were three more smaller cuts that reduced the battle scene by 40 additional seconds, and originally there was no musical score.
- The scene where Governor Kolp calls "Sergeant York" is missing.
- There are additional shots and dialogue before the mutants lay down the smoke screen.
- Roughly six minutes of the battle were cut.
- The scene where Aldo kills Governor Kolp and his followers in the school bus has been restored.
- The fight between Aldo and Caesar is longer.
- DELETED SCENE: Mendez has become the new governor and talks the mutant lieutenant out of firing the atomic missile. As they argue, they discover it is the Alpha-Omega bomb from Beneath the Planet of the Apes.

== Reception ==
Battle for the Planet of the Apes grossed a domestic total of $8.8 million, making it the lowest-grossing film in the series.

The film received mixed to negative reviews from critics. The film holds a 33% "Rotten" rating on the review aggregate website Rotten Tomatoes, based on 28 critical reviews. The critical consensus reads: "Bereft of bright ideas and visually shabby, Battle for the Planet of the Apes takes a celebrated franchise and blows it all up -- the maniacs!" On Metacritic, the film has an average score of 40 out of 100 based on 5 critics, indicating "mixed or average reviews." Roger Ebert of the Chicago Sun-Times gave the film two stars out of four, stating, "Battle looks like the last gasp of a dying series, a movie made simply to wring the dollars out of any remaining ape fans." Gene Siskel of the Chicago Tribune awarded one star out of four and wrote, "The fifth and last in the successful Apes series is the worst of the lot, a bloody bore." A.D. Murphy of Variety noted, "This is the fifth and last feature film of the 'Apes' series, and the fact shows too obviously in the Arthur P. Jacobs production, which is routine programmer material for fast playoff ... J. Lee Thompson's perfunctory direction both reflects and sets the sluggish tone pervading the 86-minute film." Vincent Canby of The New York Times opined that director J. Lee Thompson "will not win any awards for 'Battle,' but the film's simplicity defuses criticism. The chimpanzee and orangutan make-up remains remarkable, and the lines are occasionally bright and funny. There are far worse ways of wasting time." Tom Shales of The Washington Post wrote that the film "ends it all with more of a thud than a bang—prolonging the concept but, again, failing to extend the idea." Kevin Thomas of the Los Angeles Times wrote in a positive review that although the film "is launched from a more thinly contrived premise than any of its predecessors it becomes just as involving as they were, thanks to the strong appeal of the series' allegorical underpinnings and to the adroit direction of J. Lee Thompson, who stages several spectacular (rather than gory) battle scenes with the same finesse he displays in the film's more intimate moments." David McGillivray wrote that "almost every line of the Corringtons' thin script attests the strain of having to find anything new for the apes to say or do." John Dooley has remarked that the taboo on "No!" sounds like the N-word taboo, building on the series allegory about racism.

== Legacy ==
In the 2012 film Argo, based on the 1980 "Canadian Caper" rescue from Iran of U.S. diplomats hiding at the Canadian ambassador's residence, Tony Mendez gets the idea for the fictitious Argo cover story from watching Battle for the Planet of the Apes on television. This was a nod to the role of Planet of the Apes make-up artist John Chambers in the Canadian Caper.

== See also ==
- List of American films of 1973
