= Alan Jaggs =

British film editor (1918–2008)

- Born: 19 February 1918; Exmouth, Devon, United Kingdom
- Died: 28 April 2008 (aged 90); Mill Valley, California, United States
- Other name: Alan L. Jaggs
- Occupation: Editor
- Years active: 1938-1974 (film & TV)

Alan Jaggs (1918–2008) was a British film editor.

== Selected filmography ==
- The Return of the Frog (1938)
- Meet Maxwell Archer (1940)
- Dangerous Moonlight (1941)
- Alibi (1942)
- We'll Meet Again (1943)
- Happidrome (1943)
- Rhythm Serenade (1943)
- English Without Tears (1944)
- Mr. Emmanuel (1944)
- Men of Two Worlds (1946)
- The October Man (1947)
- Hungry Hill (1947)
- Escape (1948)
- Cardboard Cavalier (1949)
- Treasure Island (1950)
- Conquest of the Planet of the Apes (1972)
- Battle for the Planet of the Apes (1973)

== Bibliography ==
- Eric Greene. Planet of the Apes as American Myth: Race, Politics, and Popular Culture. Wesleyan University Press, 1998.
