= Severn Darden =

American actor (1929–1995)

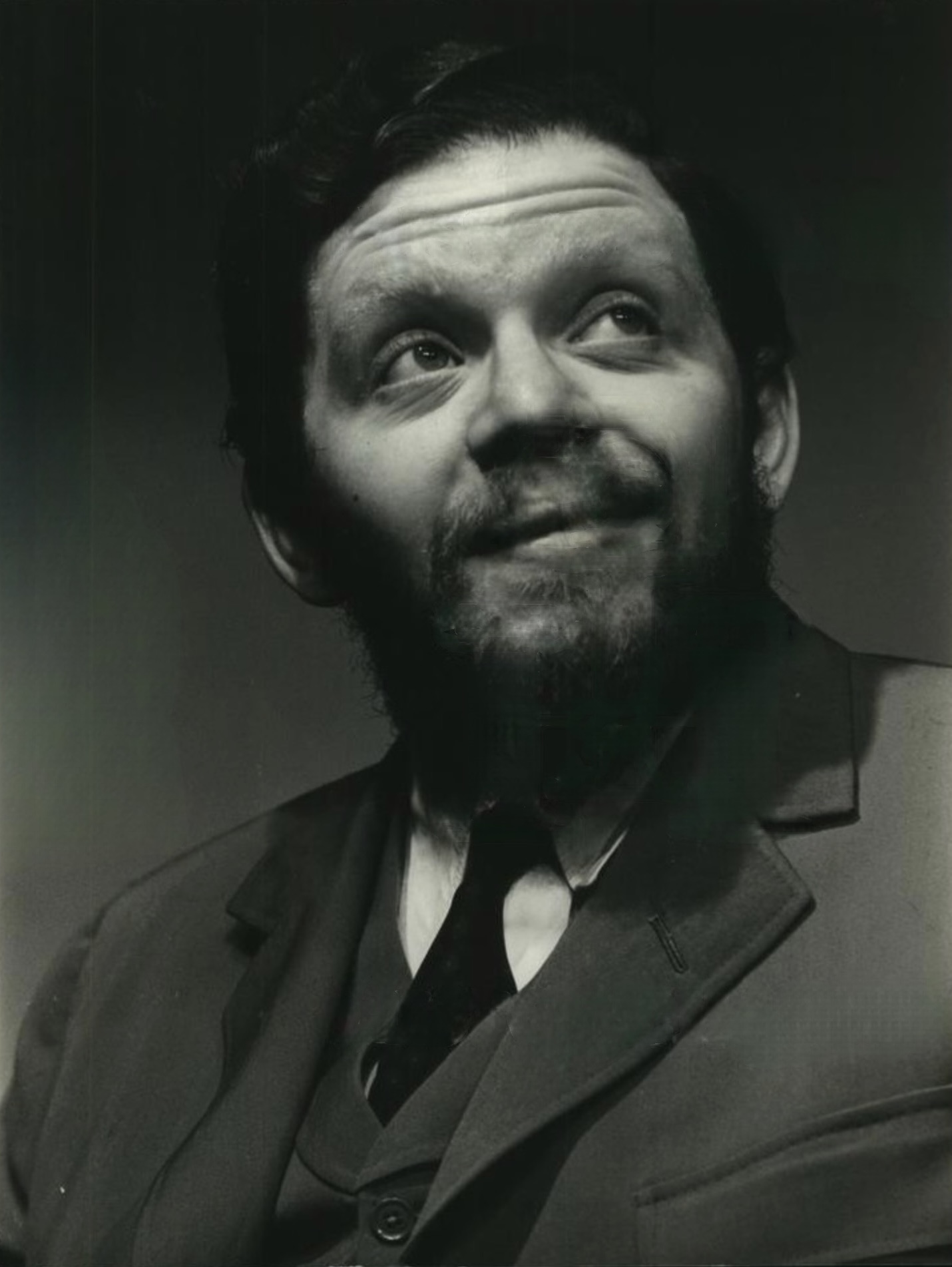
- Darden in 1961
- Born: Severn Teakle Darden Jr. November 9, 1929; New Orleans, Louisiana, U.S.
- Died: May 27, 1995 (aged 65); Santa Fe, New Mexico, U.S.
- Occupations: Actor, comedian
- Years active: 1961–1989
- Spouse(s): Erin Martin; Heather Bleackley

Severn Teakle Darden Jr. (November 9, 1929 – May 27, 1995) was an American comedian and actor, and a founding member of The Second City Chicago-based comedy troupe as well as its predecessor, the Compass Players. He is known from his film appearances for playing the human leader Kolp in the fourth and fifth Planet of the Apes films. His live comedy improv skit under the character of "Walther von der Vogelweide" was influential with two generations of comic performers. He has been called the "improviser's improvisor", and the original "kamikaze improviser" archetype, prefiguring Jim Belushi and Chris Farley.

== Background ==
Born in New Orleans, Louisiana, he attended the University of Chicago, where he was a "campus legend" according to poet Paul Carroll. Darden's offbeat and intellectual sense of humor was a major element in the style of The Second City at that time, and is evident throughout his work. Carroll described him as a combination of surrealistic New Orleans and tough, caustic "Chicago Style" comedy. An example of his offbeat humor is the way he squeezed the phrase "Know thyself" into the seven-character limitation of a New Mexico license plate: NOYOSEF.

Darden was a core comedian in Paul Sills' Compass Players, the first improvisation theater in the US; it performed around the Chicago area during the mid-1950s. Sills went on to found The Second City in 1959 and brought in many of the comedians from Compass Players, including Darden.

He was present at the February 12, 1964 Acid Test organized by the Merry Pranksters in Watts, Los Angeles at Youth Opportunities. He participated with the experimental artists collective "The TeePee Video Space Troupe" (aka "The TP Video Space Troupe") organized by filmmaker Shirley Clarke.

Darden appeared in various movies and television series. A signature performance is in the 1967 comedy The President's Analyst; there he plays a major role as Kropotkin, a Soviet agent with a laid-back persona, much like Darden's own. He played a junk dealer in another early film, Luv (1967), based on the play of the same title by Murray Schisgal, which also starred Jack Lemmon, Peter Falk, Elaine May, and Nina Wayne. He also played the cold-hearted Kolp in Conquest of the Planet of the Apes and Battle for the Planet of the Apes.

Among his early TV roles were the artist Karpathia in the Car 54, Where Are You? episode "Toody and the Art World"; a toy manufacturer in an episode of The Monkees; and Dr. Herb Chisholm in a 1976 episode of the sitcom The Practice. He had previously played a fussy neuroscientist whose sleep experiments went wrong in a 1974 episode of Kolchak: The Night Stalker. He appeared in "Never Con a Killer," the 1976 pilot for the crime drama The Feather and Father Gang.

Darden was later featured in the 1985 comedy Real Genius as a highly respected, but befuddled college dean, and in 1986 in the Off-Broadway improvisational sketch comedy show Sills & Company, directed by Paul Sills.

After triple heart bypass surgery, he lived in semi-retirement in Los Angeles; he then moved to Santa Fe, New Mexico in 1992, where he died of congestive heart failure at age 65. His interment was at Lake Lawn Park and Mausoleum in his hometown of New Orleans.

Darden was married two or possibly three times. In the 1960s he was married to Erin Martin, a fellow performer who co-starred with Darden in the 1963 Off-Broadway production To the Water Tower. His last wife was Heather Bleackley, to whom he was still married when he died.

== Works ==
=== Routines ===
==== The Metaphysics Lecture ====
This faux university lecture was developed by Darden while with the Compass Players. It was first performed as a solo act in 1959 at the Gate of Horn music club. According to his New York Times obituary, this routine was influential with two generations of comedians.

Darden assumes the character of a German-accented speaker, Prof. Walther von der Vogelweide (borrowing the name of the famous medieval poet). An announcer introduces the lecture as A Short Talk on the Universe, and the professor begins as follows: "Now, why — you will ask me — have I chosen to speak on the Universe, rather than some other topic. Well, it's very simple: there isn’t anything else!" The lecture is loaded with digressions and double-talk about time, space, etc., ending with questions from the audience on which he improvises.

==== Oedipus ====
This was another Prof. Walther von der Vogelweide lecture (with the assistance of the rest of the Second City cast). The subject was "free will and necessity in the light of […] Oedipus Rex", or "what would have happened to Oedipus if he had read the book before going on the journey". The professor plays the role of Oedipus and refuses to perform the acts that would lead to his fate, but finds that despite his apparent agency the other characters respond in ways that produce the same results.

In the first scene, Oedipus encounters his father Laius, knowing that if all goes according to the book the two will get into a brawl, and he will commit the serious sin of killing his own father. Aware of this, Oedipus is very deferential to Laius, only to find that the father is extremely touchy and hostile to anything that smacks of sycophancy. Despite Oedipus' continued deference and protestations, Laius becomes increasingly angry and finally suffers a fatal heart attack.

In the next scene, the Sphinx energetically tries to wheedle him into answering her riddle correctly, which Oedipus does not want to do. At one point she says, "Think of the power—of the glory—". He responds, "I don't need power and glory, I'm a full professor."

In the last scene, Oedipus is on the very point of gouging his eyes out when he suddenly stops and says "Wait a minute." He has realized something which he announces to the crowd: the actual results were due to chance or forced on him against his will. He explains how that applies to each "choice" and ends with "It's not my fault!" The people murmur among themselves for a few seconds, then repeatedly shout in agreement, and his eyes are saved. The professor ends the sketch by saying, "So you see, my dear students, the lesson that we learn from this is that Man has free will, but tragic poets do not, and Art is not Nature."

==== Football Comes to the University of Chicago ====
This sketch was originally developed for the Compass Players and revisited for Second City. It satirized the university and its students, presenting a possible explanation for the failure to introduce football. A typical coach teaches "Football 202" and struggles with the intellectual students. Darden plays Morgenstern, a student who states his field is the "history of arithmetic". After the coach mentions the football positions called "ends", Morgenstern asks where the beginnings for those ends are, because ends must have beginnings, according to Aristotle. The coach presents the football, and Morgenstern declares, "It's a demi-poly-tetrahedron."

=== Films ===
- Goldstein (1964) – Doctor
- The Double-Barrelled Detective Story (1965) – H.S. Stevens
- Dead Heat on a Merry-go-round (1966) – Miles Fisher
- Fearless Frank (1967) – Doctor / Claude
- Luv (1967) – Vandergist
- The President's Analyst (1967) – V.I. Kydor Kropotkin
- P.J. (1968) – Shelton Quell
- Model Shop (1969) – Portly Man
- The Mad Room (1969) – Nate
- Justine (1969) – Bathazar
- The Virgin President (1969) – U.S. President / Fillmard Millmore
- They Shoot Horses, Don't They? (1969) – Cecil
- To See or Not to See (animated short; 1969) – Voice
- Pussycat, Pussycat, I Love You (1970)
- Bongo Wolf's Revenge (1970)
- Vanishing Point (1971) – J. Hovah
- The Hired Hand (1971) – McVey
- Werewolves on Wheels (1971) – One
- The Last Movie (1971) (also composer) – Mayor
- Cisco Pike (1972) – Lawyer
- The War Between Men and Women (1972) – Dr. Harris
- Every Little Crook and Nanny (1972) – Dominic
- Conquest of the Planet of the Apes (1972) – Kolp
- The Legend of Hillbilly John (1972) – Mr. Marduke
- Play It as It Lays (1972) – Hypnotist
- Dirty Little Billy (1972) – Big Jim McDaniel
- Battle for the Planet of the Apes (1973) – Governor Kolp
- The Day of the Dolphin (1973) – Schwinn – Foundation
- I Wonder Who's Killing Her Now? (1975) – Mr. Fletch / Dr. deHart
- Jackson County Jail (1976) – Sheriff Dempsey
- Mother, Jugs & Speed (1976) – Moran
- Victory at Entebbe (1976, TV Movie) – Moshe Meyer
- Wanda Nevada (1979) – Merlin Bitterstix
- A Small Circle of Friends (1980) – Art Professor
- Why Would I Lie? (1980) – Dr. Barbour
- In God We Tru$t (1980) – Priest
- Hopscotch (1980) – Maddox
- Soggy Bottom U.S.A. (1981) – Horace Mouthamush
- Saturday the 14th (1981) – Van Helsing
- Quarterback Princess (1983) – Mr. Hobart
- A Minor Miracle (1983) – Seminary Provincial
- Real Genius (1985) – Dr. Meredith
- Back to School (1986) – Dr. Borozini
- The Telephone (1988) – Max

=== Television series ===
- Alfred Hitchcock Presents (1961) (Season 7 Episode 6: "Beta Delta Gamma") as Franklin
- Charlie Paradise TV series pilot (1960). Darden played an eccentric painter named Flute who is murdered in his Greenwich Village studio in this unsold pilot intended as a spinoff to the Edward Binns CBS drama "Brenner", and which was eventually repackaged for air as the last episode of the series.
- Car 54, Where Are You? (1962) (Season 1 Episode 21: "Toody and the Art World") Darden plays Karpathia, a painter whose work appears to awaken an enthusiasm for modern art in Toody. This episode is particularly notable because Karpathia's temperament and accent somewhat resemble those of Professor Walther von der Vogelweide. Thus the portrayal gives us a hint of what Darden was like in his lectures. Darden's scenes take up about 9 minutes of the episode.
- Honey West (1966) (Season 1 Episode 27: "Little Green Robin Hood") as Dr. Gregory Ames
- The Monkees (1966) (Season 1 Episode 3: "Monkee vs. Machine") He plays the confused president of a toy company who is manipulated by Daggart (Stan Freberg), a scheming executive who wants to make shoddier toys for the purpose of "planned obsolescence".
- I Dream of Jeannie (1967) (Season 3 Episode 12: "Jeannie and the Great Bank Robbery") as Milton
- The Monkees (1968) (Season 2 Episode 19: "The Monkee's Paw") In a very brief scene, Darden has an uncredited role as a psychiatrist who angrily insists that the Monkees' interpretations of inkblots are wrong. This is notable because the portrayal is exactly like Professor Walther von der Vogelweide in his most vehement moments.
- Daniel Boone (1968) (Season 5 Episode 9: "Valley of the Sun") as Sir Hubert Spencer
- It Takes a Thief (1969) (Season 3 Episode 1: "Saturday Night in Venice") as Ambassador Nikolai Palenkin
- Alias Smith and Jones (1971) (Season 1 Episode 14: "Never Trust an Honest Man") Oscar Harlenjen and Alan Harlenjen (In a dual role, as father and son)
- Night Gallery (1972) (Season 2 Episode 21: "You Can't Get Help Like That Anymore") as Dr. Kessler
- Kolchak: The Night Stalker (1974) (Season 1 Episode 9: "The Spanish Moss Murders") as Dr. Aaron Pollack
- Wonder Woman (1975) (TV movie) "The New Original Wonder Woman"
- The Ghost Busters (1975) (Season 1 Episode 11: "Dr. Jekyll and Mr. Hyde...Together, for the First Time!") as Dr. Jekyll
- Harry O (1975) (Season 2 episode 6: "The Acolyte")
- Barney Miller (1976) (Season 2 Episode 22: "The Mole") as Randolph Cook
- Captains and the Kings (1976) (TV movie) as Plover
- The Six Million Dollar Man (1976)
  - (Season 3 Episode 17: "The Secret of Bigfoot, Part 1") as Apploy
  - (Season 3 Episode 18: "The Secret of Bigfoot, Part 2") as Apploy
  - (Season 4 Episode 1: "The Return of Bigfoot, Part 1") as Apploy
- The Bionic Woman (1976) (Season 2 Episode 1: "The Return of Bigfoot: Part II") as Apploy
- Laverne & Shirley (1977) (Season 2 Episode 23: "Citizen Krane") as Charles Pfister Krane
- Cheers (1983) (Season 2 Episode 4: "Homicidal Ham") as Professor DeWitt (with fellow Second City alumni Shelley Long and George Wendt)
- The Paper Chase (1984) (Season 2 Episode 12: "The War of the Wonks") as Professor Edwin
- Faerie Tale Theatre (1986) (Season 5 Episode 2: "The Princess Who Had Never Laughed") as Farmer Silas
- Beauty and the Beast (1988) (Season 1 Episode 20: "To Reign in Hell") as Waterman (uncredited)
- Beauty and the Beast (1989) (Season 2 Episode 14: "When the Blue Bird Sings") as Mr. Smythe

=== Recordings ===
- The Metaphysics Lecture (recorded Jan. 30, 1961) and Oedipus are on an LP of Darden comedy routines titled The Sound of My Own Voice (and Other Noises), Mercury OCS 6202, OCLC 12851697.
- Football Comes to the University of Chicago is on CD 3 of the collection But Seriously: the American Comedy Box, Rhino R2 71617, 1995, ISBN 1-56826-457-7.
