= List of Planet of the Apes characters =

Planet of the Apes is a science fiction media franchise consisting of films, books, television series, comics, and other media about a post-apocalyptic world in which humans and intelligent apes clash for control as the dominant species. Accordingly, the primary characters of the franchise include individuals belonging to both species, acting as protagonists and antagonists across the series in three disparate timelines. This list features characters from the original film (based on Pierre Boulle's 1963 novel Planet of the Apes), its sequels, and reboots.

== Characters introduced in the original film series ==
=== Taylor ===
Taylor
- Planet of the Apes character
- First appearance: Planet of the Apes (1968)
- Last appearance: Beneath the Planet of the Apes (1970)
- Created by: Michael Wilson; Rod Serling
- Portrayed by: Charlton Heston

In-universe information
- Full name: George Taylor
- Species: Human
- Occupation: Astronaut
- Affiliation: National Aeronautics and Space Administration (NASA)

George Taylor, more commonly known as Taylor, is the main protagonist of the original Planet of the Apes film also appearing in Beneath the Planet of the Apes. Taylor is an American astronaut and the leader of a space expedition. Taylor was played by Charlton Heston. While Taylor's first name is never spoken in dialogue, the end credits of Planet of the Apes identify him as George Taylor. Taylor was born or very likely born, in Fort Wayne, Indiana, where he learned to read and write in Jefferson Public School.

At the start of Planet of the Apes, Taylor and two of his crew wake from hibernation to discover their spaceship has crash-landed in a lake on what they take to be an Earth-like, but largely barren, planet orbiting a Sun-like star in the constellation Orion. The ship's chronometer reads as Earth year 3978, 2,010 Earth years after their take-off. As the ship sinks, the three astronauts escape.

Taylor and his crew explore, finding mute humans being hunted by gorillas on horseback. Taylor is shot in his throat, and taken to Ape City. His crew mates Dodge and Landon are killed and lobotomised, respectively. Taylor is examined by chimpanzee psychologist Dr. Zira and Dr. Cornelius, thinking he might be a missing link between humans and their "evolved superiors", the apes. Learning of Taylor's intelligence, orangutan Dr Zaius wants Taylor put to death and to know where he came from. Taylor escapes from the laboratory with Cornelius and Zira, and eventually ends up discovering the planet he is on is Earth.

In Beneath the Planet of the Apes, Heston returns as Taylor, helping another astronaut named Brent, who was originally sent to rescue Taylor, to destroy a nuclear weapon worshipped by underground mutants. In the process, the weapon is detonated, destroying everything.

In Escape from the Planet of the Apes, Taylor is briefly mentioned and referred to as Colonel Taylor despite the character never being given a military rank in the two previous films.

=== Dr Cornelius ===
Dr Cornelius
- Planet of the Apes character
- First appearance: Planet of the Apes (1968)
- Last appearance: Escape from the Planet of the Apes (1971)
- Created by: Pierre Boulle
- Portrayed by: Roddy McDowall; David Watson (Beneath the Planet of the Apes)

In-universe information
- Species: Chimpanzee
- Occupation: historian, archaeologist
- Affiliation: Ape City

Dr. Cornelius is a chimpanzee archaeologist and historian who appears in the original novel of Planet of the Apes (La Planète des singes), and also the first three installments of the classic movie series of the same name. Cornelius was played in the first and third film by Roddy McDowall, and in the second by David Watson.

In 1968's Planet of the Apes, Cornelius is introduced as the fiancé of Dr. Zira, an animal psychologist and veterinarian, both of whom are on the scientific staff of Dr. Zaius. Cornelius begins to question how the ape society began, especially its evolution. Cornelius sees that Taylor is worthy of consideration as an intelligent being. Cornelius and Zira escape with Taylor to the "Forbidden Zone" (a wasteland where humans are said to come from) to a site where Cornelius had been digging the year before. Dr. Zaius pursues them, is captured by Taylor and is forced to accept the evidence for a pre-ape human society. Cornelius accepts that apes did not evolve from humans, and rediscovered the inventions that humans had created. Taylor leaves; the artifacts are destroyed, and Cornelius and Zira return home.

In Beneath the Planet of the Apes, Cornelius and Zira meet another astronaut, Brent, who appears at their doorstep after being shot by a gorilla. Cornelius gives Brent a map leading to where they left Taylor and instructs him not to let other apes hear him speak.

In Escape from the Planet of the Apes, Cornelius and Zira themselves become astronauts, escaping their world in Taylor's spacecraft that was found and restored by their friend Dr Milo, and travelling back in time to roughly 1–3 years after Taylor's departure. They discover a world run by humans and deduce it is their own planet from the apes' prehistory. After being celebrities, the apes are imprisoned and interrogated by the humans. Zira is pregnant and this puts the fear of an ape-run Earth in the humans. Zira gives birth to Milo (renamed Caesar in Conquest of the Planet of the Apes ) and is taken into hiding by Armando, a sympathetic circus owner. After being discovered by Dr. Hasslein, Cornelius and Zira escape with a normal chimpanzee baby, which they had switched with Milo to ensure his safety. All three are killed.

=== Dr Zira ===
Dr Zira
- Planet of the Apes character
- First appearance: Planet of the Apes (1968)
- Last appearance: Escape from the Planet of the Apes (1971)
- Created by: Pierre Boulle
- Portrayed by: Kim Hunter

In-universe information
- Species: Chimpanzee
- Occupation: psychologist, veterinarian
- Affiliation: Ape City

Dr. Zira is a chimpanzee psychologist and veterinarian, who specializes in the study of humans, in the novel and subsequent film series. Zira was played in the first three films by Kim Hunter.

Zira is the partner of Cornelius, with both reporting to Dr. Zaius. Zira is outspoken by nature, deploring war and militancy and despising the gorillas who make both a way of life. In the original novel, Zira discovers that her caged laboratory human, called Ulysse Mérou, isn't a native-born, mute human of her planet, but a space traveller capable of speech. Zira secretly teaches him the language of the apes in hopes of eventually making a public demonstration.

In Planet of the Apes, Zira meets astronaut Taylor, who is unable to speak after being shot in the throat. As Zira tends to his wound, she discovers Taylor has intelligence beyond any human she has ever seen; she pairs him with a female human called Nova, also intelligent (though somewhat less evolved and incapable of speech), hoping the two will breed. Taylor eventually speaks and Zira shows him off to Cornelius. Both believe that he might be a “missing link” to explain the similarities between ape-human behaviour and anatomy. In both novel and film, Zira ultimately helps Mérou/Taylor and Nova to escape the world of the apes, coming to appreciate each as thinking creatures like herself.

In Beneath the Planet of the Apes, Zira and Cornelius meet the astronaut Brent, who has been sent to rescue Taylor, but is now in need of help. Zira treats Brent's wounds and sends him on with Nova.

In Escape from the Planet of the Apes, Zira (who is now pregnant), Cornelius and Dr Milo travel back-in-time, via Taylor's restored spaceship, to a time 1–3 years after Taylor's space mission began. Zira and Cornelius are first celebrated by the modern human society on Earth, but are then publicly rejected, partly due to Zira's confessions of her connections with human experiments. Zira and Cornelius are confined and interrogated, where details of their origin, as well as humanity's downfall, further stigmatise the couple. After her baby is born, he is swapped-out for another baby chimp; her actual son, Milo, is moved to safety. Zira and Cornelius escape with the normal chimpanzee baby but are shot in the process. In Battle for the Planet of the Apes, Zira appears in video stills, as her voice tells the story of their space-flight and Earth's destruction while her son, Caesar, watches.

=== Dr Zaius ===
Planet of the Apes character

Dr Zaius
- Species: Orangutan
- First appearance: Planet of the Apes (1968)
- Last appearance: Beneath the Planet of the Apes (1970)
- Created by: Pierre Boulle
- Portrayed by: Maurice Evans; Booth Colman; Richard Blackburn (voice)

Dr. Zaius is an orangutan who has a minor role in the Pierre Boulle novel Planet of the Apes, but becomes a prominent antagonist in the films. A character called Councilor Zaius appears in the television series based upon it. Zaius was played by Maurice Evans in the films and by Booth Colman in the television series. Zaius was voiced in the animated series by Richard Blackburn. In a short film used to pitch the story's concept, Zaius was played by Edward G. Robinson.

In Planet of the Apes, Zaius is the Minister of Science and Chief Defender of the Faith, which grants him access to ancient scrolls not privy to the ape masses. Zaius knows the true origins of the ape society, how humanity fell as the dominant species, and the reasons why the "Forbidden Zone" is so named, and he blames human nature for it all. Zaius prefers an ignorant ape culture to the scientifically open one posed by Cornelius and Zira. Intelligent humans like Taylor (and human technology) cause Zaius to fear another downfall, along with the possibility of a human resurgence. Zaius destroys the archaeological findings of human artifacts predating the ape society. Zaius' actions are to protect the world from humanity, but he has respect for Taylor, advising him not to pursue the mystery as to how the apes evolved from humans because it will not help him and he may not like what he discovers.

In Beneath the Planet of the Apes, Zaius leaves on a military expedition with General Ursus to invade the "Forbidden Zone" and meets Taylor once more, in a showdown between the gorillas and a mutant human race living underground in the Zone. Taylor tries to keep the mutants from activating a Doomsday bomb, being shot in the process by gorillas. Mortally wounded, Taylor begs Zaius to help him stop the bomb; Zaius refuses, declaring "Man is evil, capable only of destruction!" In Taylor's last dying moments, his hand accidentally falls on the bomb's triggering mechanism, causing it to activate and destroy Earth.

In the television series, a character called Councillor Zaius serves as a government official, with authority over all the humans in his district. The young chimpanzee Galen becomes his new assistant, but becomes a fugitive with two human astronauts Virdon and Burke, fleeing from Zaius and his gorilla enforcer, General Urko.

=== General Aldo ===
In Battle for the Planet of the Apes, Aldo is the general of the gorilla militia which guards the outskirts of Ape City. Aldo was played by Claude Akins.

Aldo is jealous of his human advisers as well as of Caesar and his son, Cornelius. Aldo would like to replace Caesar as leader. Humans live alongside apes in the city, but as second class citizens. He discovers a large number of irradiated humans still alive underground in the bomb-destroyed city they escaped. Aldo uses this as an excuse to corral all the humans of Ape City and declare martial law. Caesar and Aldo fight together against the attack, and beat back the humans. Aldo ignores Caesar's order to stand down, and leads his forces to hunt down the retreating mutant humans. Caesar discovers Aldo's role in his son's death. Upon Aldo's return from the hunt, Caesar confronts him resulting in Aldo's death.

A chimpanzee character named Aldo was portrayed by David Chow in the previous film Conquest of the Planet of the Apes. Another Aldo is mentioned in Escape from the Planet of the Apes as the first ape to say "no" (a word that had repeatedly been spoken to him by humans), but it is never confirmed if that Aldo is either of the same characters depicted in the other films.

=== Armando ===
Armando is a circus owner, a human friend of Cornelius and Zira, and the foster-father of Caesar in Conquest of the Planet of the Apes. Armando was played by Ricardo Montalbán.

Armando is a believer in Saint Francis of Assisi, "who loved all animals". Armando aids Cornelius and Zira in Escape from the Planet of the Apes, when most of humanity rejects them. The United States Government plans to sterilise the couple for the benefit of humanity. Armando states that if the human race is ever dominated by another species, he would like most of all for it to be the chimpanzee. Armando saves their newly born son Milo (Caesar), but cannot save Cornelius and Zira from being killed. He takes responsibility for Caesar, raising him publicly as a circus chimpanzee, while privately teaching him human knowledge and introducing him to human habits. In Conquest of the Planet of the Apes, Armando brings Caesar to a large city for the first time after raising him in remote areas. Caesar is unaware of apes' adoption as pets to replace the dogs and cats lost to a space-born plague. Armando keeps Caesar on a short leash in public, but catches the attention of the police during an incident where Caesar cries out. Armando claims to be the one who cried out, and instructs Caesar to wait for him near the docks where shipments of apes arrive nightly for "conditioning". Caesar finds himself assigned to Ape Management's command post. Armando undergoes a lengthy interrogation at the hands of the state's authorities, who believe his alibi, but insist on using a hypnotic device which compels its subjects to tell the complete truth. Unwilling to betray Caesar, Armando throws himself through a window to his death.

=== Governor Breck ===
Governor Breck is the main antagonist in Conquest of the Planet of the Apes. Breck was played by Don Murray.

Breck is a province governor who rules in an authoritarian manner; he witnesses an ape auction one day, and on a whim bids on a young chimpanzee. He wins the bid and shows the chimpanzee a book to choose a name from. The name he chooses is "Caesar", pretending to just point randomly. Breck decides to assign Caesar to his command post, as a messenger. Breck discovers irregularities in Caesar's original shipment to the city, leading him to torture Caesar with an electroshock table, eventually forcing Caesar to reveal he can talk. Ordering his assistant to kill Caesar, Breck is betrayed as the assistant helps Caesar to escape. The escaped Caesar starts a revolution which forces Breck to declare martial law and order all apes be killed. Breck loses the struggle and is captured by the apes, being forced to admit to his only failures, as the apes raise their weapons and beat Breck to his death.

=== Brent ===
Brent is an American astronaut and a main protagonist in Beneath the Planet of the Apes. Brent was played by James Franciscus.

Brent is sent after Taylor's ship on its flight to another star. Brent's ship follows the same trajectory and runs into the same problems, crash-landing in the "Forbidden Zone". Brent is the sole survivor and meets Nova; he sees she wears Taylor's dog tags and demands she take him to Taylor. Nova takes Brent to Ape City to look for Zira, where Brent is shot by a gorilla. Brent is tended to by Cornelius and Zira, who help smuggle them out of Ape City into the Forbidden Zone, where they find the remains of New York City and its mutant inhabitants. Brent is interrogated by the mutants as to his purpose and the purpose of the apes tracking him. Brent is reunited with Taylor in a prison cell, where they are forced to fight each other; the fight is disrupted by the arrival of Nova and the three escape as the gorilla army invades the underground city. The three attempt to stop the apes from destroying the city, but Brent is killed by the gorilla troops moments before the mutant's Doomsday bomb is detonated.

=== Dr Otto Hasslein ===
Dr Otto Hasslein is a physicist, proposer of the "Hasslein curve" and attached to the space flight project that involved both Taylor and Brent. Hasslein was played by Eric Braeden. He is the main antagonist of Escape from the Planet of the Apes.

In Escape from the Planet of the Apes, Dr Hasslein explains to a television news presenter his theories of time, and his belief that changing the future may be possible. He compares time to be a highway with an infinite number of lanes, all going from the past to the future; by changing lanes, one can change destiny. Hasslein learns that talking chimpanzees have arrived in the present day from Earth's future. While the other members of the Presidential Commission appointed to deal with the "alien visitors" are initially skeptical of the time-travel story, Hasslein sees confirmation of his theories and is afraid that the pair's presence may start humanity's downfall. Hasslein's influence results in the apes being taken into custody, drugged and interrogated. The apes' testimony results in the decision that Zira should be prevented from giving birth and both apes should be sterilised. Cornelius and Zira escape military custody and Hasslein orders a full-scale hunt. Hasslein tracks down the apes as they are about to board a ship and demands the now-newborn baby be handed over. Zira refuses and, as other authorities approach, Hasslein shoots both Zira and the baby. This is seen by Cornelius who shoots at Hasslein, killing him.

=== Kolp ===
Kolp is a government official and later Governor of a band of mutants, he is the main antagonist of the Battle for the Planet of the Apes. Kolp was played by Severn Darden.

Kolp first appears in Conquest of the Planet of the Apes as a ruling secret police official on Governor Breck's staff. He helps interrogate Armando and track down the originating shipment that had carried Caesar to Ape Management. Kolp survives the final fight in Conquest by hiding with other humans in underground bunkers.

Several years after the war in Battle for the Planet of the Apes, Kolp is in charge of the humans left in what was Ape Management, now called the Forbidden Zone. Kolp's agents discover ape spies and he assumes they have come to loot or attack; the party is driven off and tracked back to Ape City. Kolp is jealous of the relative health and prosperity of Ape City, and marshals his forces to conquer it. Méndez, Kolp's second-in-command, points out that attacking Ape City would end years of peace and is dismissed by Kolp. Kolp supervises the attack commanding his troops to destroy Ape City. Kolp confronts Caesar in the fight, taunting him, and eventually loses the upper hand allowing Caesar to launch a counterattack which forces Kolp back. Kolp is killed by Aldo and his gorilla troops.

=== Dr Maximus ===
Dr Maximus is the Commissioner for Animal (i.e., human) Affairs in Planet of the Apes. Maximus was played by Woodrow Parfrey.

Dr Zaius brings Dr Maximus to the laboratory where Cornelius and Zira have given safe haven to Taylor. As Commissioner of Animal Affairs, Dr Maximus orders that Taylor be removed from the area, which is restricted to apes. Dr Maximus is part of the National Academy tribunal which tries to discover if Zira and Cornelius surgically altered Taylor to speak.

=== Méndez ===
Méndez is the leader of a group of mutant humans in Beneath the Planet of the Apes. Méndez was played by Paul Richards.

Méndez leads the descendants of survivors of a nuclear war, which destroyed most of humanity and allowed the apes to rise to power. The humans have mutated gaining psychic powers and losing their human appearance, whereby they wear masks and wigs to resemble their ancestors more closely. The mutants worship a still operational nuclear missile left over from their ancestors. When Taylor and Brent are captured, Méndez decides to have them kill each other. When the apes arrive, Méndez tries to reason with General Ursus but is killed after arming the missile, moments before Taylor detonates the missile's warhead.

Méndez is also the name of a subordinate of Kolp in Battle for the Planet of the Apes. Méndez was played by Paul Stevens.

Méndez is left in charge of the underground city when Governor Kolp goes to battle with Ape City. After Kolp loses the battle, the missile is meant to be fired at Ape City, but Méndez decides not to, knowing the missile will kill them all; he instead chooses to venerate the weapon. Implicitly, he is the ancestor of the other Méndez. Some early home video releases omit the later scene, obscuring this plot element.

=== Nova ===
Nova is a primitive mute young woman in the novel Planet of the Apes by Pierre Boulle. In the first two Planet of the Apes films, Nova was played by Linda Harrison.

In Planet of the Apes, Nova is captured by the apes alongside Taylor, they are taken to ape city where they are paired up in a cell. Eventually she and Taylor escape to the Forbidden Zone with the help of Zira and Cornelius.

In Beneath the Planet of the Apes, she and Taylor journey through the Forbidden Zone, where Taylor mysteriously disappears. Nova meets another astronaut, Brent. Brent is brought by Nova to Zira and Cornelius, but they are captured by the gorillas. Escaping, they head for the Forbidden Zone, where they discover a forgotten city peopled by telepathic mutants who worship a massive cobalt bomb. Nova and Brent are imprisoned, Brent with Taylor. Nova, seeing Brent and Taylor trying to kill each other, both being hypnotized by one of the mutants, and cries out Taylor's name. This frees Taylor from their mind control, which allows all three to escape, at the same time as General Ursus' army invades the city. The trio are ambushed by a gorilla soldier, who fatally shoots Nova, before Brent and Taylor manage to kill him.

A variation of Nova appears in War for the Planet of the Apes, portrayed by Amiah Miller. This incarnation is a child who was rendered mute after being infected with a mutated strain of the Simian Flu that leaves infected mute and primitive. She was originally cared for by her father in a remote settlement until he is killed by Caesar in self-defense and taken in by Caesar's orangutan ally, Maurice, who later names her Nova after a Chevy Nova emblem she received from Bad Ape. Nova also learns how to communicate with sign language.

In Kingdom of the Planet of the Apes, Nova is a young woman who encounters the protagonist Noa and his orangutan acquaintance Raka. When they first encounter her, Raka names her Nova, but her real name is later revealed to be Mae. It is unknown what became of the original Nova.

=== General Ursus ===
General Ursus is the gorilla general in ape city in Beneath the Planet of the Apes, serving as the main antagonist of the film. Ursus was played by James Gregory.

At a meeting of the Ape Council, General Ursus uses the recent raids by wild humans as a cover to invade the Forbidden Zone, where few apes have ventured since the beginning of their society. Ursus thinks a tribe of humans lives there, due to his gorilla scouts failing to return from the Zone. Ursus is successful and assembles a gorilla army, which marches into the Forbidden Zone accompanied by Dr Zaius. The group of intelligent mutants that dwell in the Forbidden Zone use their psychic powers to deter the apes, Ursus and his gorillas are frightened, but Dr Zaius becomes enraged, charging forward. Ursus and his soldiers then follow Zaius, finding the entrance to the mutant city and leading the apes into the heart of the mutant world which houses a nuclear weapon. Ursus meets the mutant leader, who is killed, and commands for the nuclear weapon to be pulled down. Zaius pleads with Ursus not to touch the missile, fearing its true intent. Ursus ignores him, but is shot dead by Taylor and Brent as the humans try and prevent damage to the bomb.

=== Virgil ===
Virgil is a genius orangutan scientist in Battle for the Planet of the Apes. Virgil was played by Paul Williams.

Virgil is Ape City's foremost scientist and teacher, and an advisor and friend to Caesar. Virgil's students are both apes and humans, and he feels sorry for the humans' second-class citizen status in Ape City. Virgil accompanies Caesar on a trip to the Forbidden Zone to search for recordings of Caesar's parents, Cornelius and Zira. They return from the Forbidden City after encountering and escaping from the mutated human survivors of the city. Caesar and Virgil reluctantly prepare Ape City for a possible attack by the mutants. General Aldo sees this as a way to seize power. Caesar's son Cornelius is injured in a fall from a tree and Virgil realises Aldo was responsible. Virgil leads the apes in defence when the mutant humans attack. After the battle, he tells Caesar that Cornelius was killed by Aldo. Later, Virgil helps to rebuild Ape City, with apes and humans now sharing equal status.

== Characters introduced in the Planet of the Apes television series (1974) ==
=== Galen ===
Galen
- Planet of the Apes character
- Portrayed by: Roddy McDowall

In-universe information
- Species: Chimpanzee

Galen is a friendly and compassionate chimpanzee, the young assistant of Dr Zaius. Owing to his discovery of the truth about Earth's history, and conflict with Urko, he becomes a fugitive and the companion of the two human astronauts, Virdon and Burke. Galen was portrayed by Roddy McDowall.

=== Alan Virdon ===
Colonel Alan J. Virdon (played by Ron Harper) is the older and senior of the two astronauts stranded on the planet. Virdon is the more level-headed of the two surviving astronauts (a third astronaut died in the crash of their vessel), preferring to talk rather than fight.

=== General Urko ===
General Urko
- Planet of the Apes character
- Portrayed by: Mark Lenard

In-universe information
- Species: Gorilla

Urko is Chief of Security. A violent gorilla, he is sent to capture the astronauts, and is the main antagonist of the series. Urko was played by Mark Lenard.

=== Peter Burke ===
Peter J. Burke (played by James Naughton) is one of two astronauts stranded on the planet. The younger and junior of the two, he is more cynical of the apes than his commander, and more likely to fight than parley. An expert in many fields of technology and medicine, he is also a proficient martial arts specialist.

== Characters introduced in Planet of the Apes (2001) ==
=== General Thade ===
General Thade
- Planet of the Apes character
- First appearance: Planet of the Apes (2001)
- Created by: Tim Burton; William Broyles Jr.; Lawrence Konner; Mark Rosenthal
- Portrayed by: Tim Roth

General Thade is a chimpanzee general and the main antagonist of Tim Burton's 2001 film. Thade was played by Tim Roth.

General Thade is an ambitious and brutal leader, actively hating all humans and wanting them all exterminated. Thade gets his hatred from his father Zaius, who knew that humans were once in charge. Thade schemes to be given absolute power by the ape senate. As he pursues the ape Ari romantically, she is found gathering with human rebels and Thade brands her with a human mark. When Thade is told of a landed spacecraft, he kills the messengers to ensure the secret is kept and attempts to use the spacecraft to increase his own power; but he is stopped by Leo.

Thade's statue is shown at the end of the film in a scene where Leo has returned to Earth, apparently in his own time, only to find everything has been swapped out to apes and a statue of Thade now exists where the Lincoln Memorial should be.

=== Captain Leo Davidson ===
Captain Leo Davidson is a USAF astronaut and the main protagonist of the 2001 film. Leo was played by Mark Wahlberg.

Leo Davidson is an astronaut in Earth-orbit who in his ship accidentally falls through a vortex to another world inhabited by apes who enslave him. Leo escapes from slavery alongside other native humans and plans to try and return to Earth. Leo encounters and befriends Ari, a high-ranking female chimpanzee, who helps him. Leo makes it to his downed ship which he was separated from in the vortex. The ship landed thousands of years prior, thanks to the vortex, the apes on board escaping and creating the current ape society. Leo leads a human rebellion against the apes; as the fighting continues, another Earth ship descends into the battle, which is a podship that was following closely after Leo's ship into the vortex. The podship contains a trained chimpanzee from Leo's time which the apes interpret as the return of their God-creator, Semos. Hostilities between humans and apes cease, Leo gives the chimpanzee to Ari and takes off in the newly arrived podship, piloting it through the same electromagnetic storm that brought him there. Leo ends up crashing in front of the Lincoln Memorial in Washington, D.C., on Earth in what he believes to be his own time. As Leo realises the memorial is of General Thade, ape police officers surround him.

=== Ari ===
Ari is the chimpanzee daughter of Senator Sandar, a high-ranking member of the ape senate. Ari was played by Helena Bonham Carter.

Ari believes that apes and humans should co-exist as equals alongside one another, being depressed at how humans are treated in current ape society. Ari buys Leo in an auction and helps him and other humans escape ape city into the forbidden zone. Thade uses Ari's disappearance as a pretext to install martial law.

=== Colonel Attar ===
Attar is a gorilla colonel of the ape armies and loyal to General Thade. Attar was played by Michael Clarke Duncan.

Attar was a cruel subordinate of General Thade. Attar hates Leo for the disrespect Leo shows to ape culture, and helps lead the ape army as Thade follows Leo and Ari into the forbidden zone. As the spacepod lands during the ape-human battle, Attar accepts the trained chimpanzee inside as his God returned. In the ensuing revelations that follow, Attar realises that Thade and the elders of ape society have misled the general ape population for centuries by keeping their origins secret.

== Characters introduced in the reboot film series ==
=== Blue Eyes ===
Blue Eyes is the prince of the San Francisco Ape Colony, a member of the Ape Council, a soldier of the Ape Army, the young son of Caesar and Cornelia, and the older brother of Cornelius. Unlike other evolved apes, Blue Eyes possesses blue colored eyes, instead of green colored eyes, which is the reason for his name.

Blue Eyes is uniquely the only chimpanzee in the entire San Francisco Ape Colony, with these rare eye colors. The reason behind Blue Eyes' unique blue-irises remains a mystery, since all the other apes that were exposed to the ALZ-112 and ALZ-113 or born with advanced intelligence typically have green-irises.

=== Will Rodman ===
Planet of the Apes character

Will Rodman
- Species: Human
- First and last appearance: Rise of the Planet of the Apes
- Created by: Rick Jaffa and Amanda Silver
- Portrayed by: James Franco

Dr William "Will" Rodman is a research scientist at Gen-Sys Industries and the principal protagonist in Rise of the Planet of the Apes. Rodman was played by James Franco.

Will Rodman is a young scientist working at Gen-Sys Industries, a pharmaceutical company in San Francisco. He has been working over five years on a cure for Alzheimer's disease, which his father Charles Rodman suffers from. Will is using apes to research a drug that allows the brain to repair itself by recreating its cells. A presentation to the board of directors of the laboratory to move the testing to trials on humans fails when a chimpanzee which has had the drug rampages and is shot. The project is scrapped and all the other apes tested with the drug are ordered to be destroyed. Will secretly steals a baby chimpanzee, not being willing to destroy it, adopting it and naming him, "Caesar". Three years later, Will juxtaposes the decline in his father with Caesar growing more intelligent; this convinces Will to steal drugs from the lab to use on his father. Five years later, Charles seems to have fully recovered, being administered regular dosages of the experimental drug. Caesar is also showing more intellectual powers and keen to explore beyond his own home he shares with Will and Charles. Will grows to love Caesar like a son and explains to Caesar his origins including his mother and the reason for his intelligence. An altercation with a neighbor due to the deterioration of Charles' condition results in Caesar being taken away to a facility for abandoned apes. Will realises the human body's immune system will eventually fight and repel the experimental drug and works on a stronger strain. Will reveals to Jacobs the human trial and gets permission to test the new strain on more apes. The new more powerful drug is given on a bonobo named Koba, which appears to work. Will realises he and Jacobs are not aligned with the purpose and use of the new drug and quits the laboratory. Charles' condition is too far gone for Will to be able to administer the new drug and he dies. Will tries to take Caesar home by bribing the owner of the facility, who takes the bribe, but Caesar refuses to go. After Caesar and the other apes escape from the laboratory, Will tries again to take him home, but Caesar refuses and they part as friends.

Ten years later in Dawn of the Planet of the Apes, a wounded Caesar retreats to the derelict Rodman house. Caesar watches an old video tape of Will teaching Caesar sign language. Malcolm asks who Will was, and Caesar responds that Will was a good man like Malcolm, as Will has died from the Simian Flu virus off-screen.

=== Caroline Aranha ===
Caroline Aranha is a virtuous primatologist and veterinarian at the San Francisco Zoo; as well as the heroine and girlfriend of Will Rodman in Rise of the Planet of the Apes. Aranha was played by Freida Pinto.

=== Charles Rodman ===
Charles Rodman is a sufferer of Alzheimer's disease and father to Will Rodman in Rise of the Planet of the Apes. Rodman was played by John Lithgow.

Charles, having once been a talented professional pianist and music teacher, is suffering from Alzheimer's and slowly losing his faculties. Charles' son, Will, is researching for a cure to Alzheimer's using apes as test subjects at Gen-Sys Laboratories. Will secretly and irresponsibly tests an experimental drug on Charles, after seeing how the drugs affects a chimpanzee named Caesar, who he is rearing at home. Charles recovers his mental abilities and is able to play the piano again. This continues for five years, with Charles helping to raise Caesar. Altercations with a neighbor occur as Charles starts to relapse, showing symptoms of Alzheimer's returning, with the most serious incident resulting in Caesar attacking and biting the neighbor, causing the police to be involved.

=== Steven Jacobs ===
Steven Jacobs is the manager of Gen-Sys Laboratories and the main antagonist in 2011's Rise of the Planet of the Apes. Jacobs was played by David Oyelowo, the last name of the character being a nod to Arthur P. Jacobs, the producer of the original Planet of the Apes series.

Jacobs runs the laboratories, supervising Dr Rodman's research on drugs to cure Alzheimer's. One of Rodman's chimpanzee subjects goes berserk and Jacobs shuts down research on the drug. Five years later, Jacobs discovers Rodman has been using the drug on his own father and approves further work to refine it, including tests on more subjects against the warnings of Rodman. The main test subject, a chimpanzee named Caesar, escapes the laboratories to the San Bruno Primate Shelter. Jacobs loses other chimpanzees at his labs after they are attacked by Caesar. Jacobs chases the fleeing ape subjects with the help of the police and attempts to destroy them on the Golden Gate Bridge. Jacobs is coordinating the hunt from a helicopter, which crashes onto the bridge. As Jacobs pleads for help from the apes, Caesar turns his back, leaving him to face Koba, a previous test subject, who pushes Jacobs and the helicopter off the bridge to his death.

=== Dodge Landon ===
Dodge Landon is an employee at the San Bruno Primate Shelter in Rise of the Planet of the Apes where he enjoys abusing the apes. Landon was played by Tom Felton, the first and last name being nods to the two astronauts Dodge and Landon in the original Planet of the Apes.

When Caesar arrives at the facility, Dodge treats him poorly, enjoying torturing him. Eventually, Dodge is caged by Caesar but escapes. As repercussion for the caging, Dodge uses a cattle-prod to threaten Caesar and the other apes under his command. Caesar manages to turn the tide of power and uses a water hose on Dodge, electrocuting him to death.

=== Malcolm ===
Malcolm is the co-leader of surviving humans post-Simian Flu and former architect in Dawn of the Planet of the Apes. Malcolm was played by Jason Clarke.

Malcolm leads a small group of humans who form a strong bond with Caesar and his apes, coming to understand they need not be rivals for resources in a post-flu world. Malcolm's understanding personality makes Caesar compare him to Will Rodman, the father figure in Caesar's life.

In a deleted scene from War for the Planet of the Apes, Col. McCullough reveals to Caesar that Malcolm tried to convince him not to go to war with the apes. McCullough dismissed Malcolm as crazy and killed him.

=== Dreyfus ===
Dreyfus is a former Police Chief and Mayor of San Francisco in Dawn of the Planet of the Apes. Dreyfus was played by Gary Oldman.

Dreyfus was the passionate leader of a group of humans living in California after losing his wife and children to the Simian Flu. Dreyfus encounters Caesar and his colony at a local power station and, seeing them as a threat to humans, decides to wipe them all out leading him to become corrupt. In the final battle between the apes and humans, Dreyfus sacrifices himself to blow up the skyscraper which he hopes will kill the apes, but his death was ultimately in vain.

=== J. Wesley McCullough ===
J. Wesley McCullough is a Green Beret Colonel (former 1st Special Forces Group) in charge of a rogue battalion called Alpha Omega in War for the Planet of the Apes. He was played by Woody Harrelson.

He was a ruthless military officer, especially towards apes. He would become obsessed with destroying Caesar's ape clan, determined to preserve humans as the dominant species on Earth.

During the events of Dawn of the Planet of the Apes, Koba led an attack against Dreyfus' human settlement. In the process, the survivors made contact with Joint Base Lewis-McChord, in Seattle, Washington, where the last of the US Army was stationed. In response to the distress, Colonel McCullough's unit was deployed to California to exterminate the apes, including Caesar. After two years of war, a disillusioned McCullough went rogue from his commanders. He also ordered the extermination of all infected humans as the Simian Flu mutated, causing humans, including his own son, to lose the power of speech, being able only to grunt like animals. He had managed to capture and subjugate Caesar and his clan into forced labor, reinforcing his stronghold as the rest of the US Army would attack out of disagreement with his methods. During the battle, he fell victim to the mutated virus after picking up a contaminated doll, causing him to lose his speech. He took a gun and committed suicide.

== See also ==
- List of fictional primates
