= Caesar (Planet of the Apes) =

Planet of the Apes character

- Planet of the Apes character
- From left to right: Kelly as Baby Milo in Escape from the Planet of the Apes, Roddy McDowall as Caesar in Conquest of the Planet of the Apes, Andy Serkis as Caesar in War for the Planet of the Apes.
- First appearance: Escape from the Planet of the Apes (1971)
- Last appearance: Kingdom of the Planet of the Apes (2024)
- Created by: Paul Dehn
- Portrayed by: Original series; Kelly (Baby Milo); Walker Edmiston (voice of baby Milo); Roddy McDowall; Reboot series; Andy Serkis

In-universe information
- Alias: Milo (original series)
- Species: Evolved Chimpanzee
- Occupation: Revolutionary leader; Ruler; Original series: Circus performer; Slave; Messenger; Scholar; Reboot series: Tribal chief
- Family: Original series: Zira (mother; deceased); Cornelius (father; deceased); Armando (foster father; deceased); Comic series: Tarzan (adoptive brother); Reboot series: Bright Eyes (mother; deceased); Alpha (father; deceased); Will Rodman (adoptive father; deceased); Caroline Aranha (adoptive mother; deceased); Charles Rodman (adoptive grandfather; deceased)
- Spouses: Original series: Lisa (wife); Reboot series: Cornelia (wife; deceased)
- Children: Original series: Cornelius II (son; deceased); Reboot series: Blue Eyes (son; deceased); Cornelius (son)
- Relatives: Reboot series: Lake (daughter-in-law)
- Origin: Original series: San Francisco, California; United States; Comic series: Mangani Kingdom; Africa; Reboot series: San Francisco, California, United States (West African descent)

Caesar is a fictional character in the 20th Century Fox's Planet of the Apes franchise. He is the leader of the apes in both the original and reboot series. Caesar is portrayed by Roddy McDowall in Conquest of the Planet of the Apes (1972) and Battle for the Planet of the Apes (1973); his likeness is reprised in the comic series Tarzan on the Planet of the Apes (2016). Andy Serkis portrayed the character in the reboot series, consisting of Rise of the Planet of the Apes (2011), Dawn of the Planet of the Apes (2014), and War for the Planet of the Apes (2017).

Caesar is an evolved chimpanzee who is the leader of the ape army, the king of the ape colony, and the patriarch of the royal ape family. In the original series, Caesar is the biological son of Cornelius and Zira, the foster son of Armando, the husband of Lisa, and the father of Cornelius II. In the comic series, Caesar was raised by Cornelius and Zira, along with a human adoptive brother, Tarzan.

In the rebooted series, Caesar is instead the son of Alpha and Bright Eyes, two normal apes, the latter of which was experimented on in an effort to cure Alzheimer's, with the intelligence gained passed on to Caesar. Caesar is raised by Will Rodman, the scientist in charge of the experiment, and his girlfriend Caroline Aranha after the death of his mother, but is forced to live in captivity at the San Bruno Primate Shelter after attacking a neighbor.

Caesar later leads his fellow apes in a rebellion against abusive handlers and the police by unleashing the deadly ALZ-113 virus, which is dangerous to the human population but not the apes. Caesar maintains dominance over his community of intelligent apes while also having to deal with the threat of war against human survivors, who had been pushed to near-extinction due to a pandemic known as the Simian Flu, originating from the ALZ-113 virus.

Serkis' performance as Caesar in the rebooted series garnered praise from critics.

== Background ==
=== Original series ===
Born as "Milo", named after his parents' friend Dr. Milo, Caesar first appeared in Escape from the Planet of the Apes as the son of talking chimpanzees Cornelius and Zira after they travelled back in time to the Earth of Taylor's era. As the infant was feared to be the cause of the future where his parents originated, Milo was raised by circus owner Armando after Zira switched him with a young chimpanzee recently born to Armando's primitive chimpanzee, Heloise, prior to his parents' death by the action of the human Dr. Otto Hasslein. As Hasslein killed the infant with Zira disposing of the body, Milo was assumed dead and was raised by Armando as a mute acrobat who was renamed "Caesar".

In Conquest of the Planet of the Apes, two decades after the events in Escape, a now-adult Caesar and Armando maintain a charade by having Armando keep him on a chain as a pet, while Armando secretly educates Caesar on the events that led to the apes' state of slavery. Caesar is taken to a city for the first time and sees groups of apes being dispersed, chimps and orangutans being scolded or punished for honest mistakes or for exhibiting apelike behavior. Upon seeing the barbaric treatments of his fellow apes, he impulsively cries out, "Lousy human bastards!" Armando attempts to convince the police that he was the one who spoke, but Caesar panics and runs away in the commotion with Armando deciding to have him join an arrival shipment of apes while he attempts to bluff his way out of trouble.

Passing his conditioning with flying colors, Caesar is held at an auction and is sold to Governor Breck and supervised by his assistant Mr. MacDonald. When Breck brings out a reference book as a means to formally name him, Caesar chooses his adopted name under the guise of a random picking and is assigned to the city's "ape management" command post and its lockup for disobedient apes. He is also selected to mate with Lisa at that time. When Caesar learns that Armando died while in custody, he plots an ape revolt and convinces the other apes to join him. But Caesar is belatedly traced, where he soon gets captured and then gets interrogated and tortured by Breck, who forces him to expose his identity as the offspring of Cornelius and Zira. When Breck is about to execute Caesar, MacDonald excuses himself from the scene and turns off the breaker settings for the electroshock table, where Caesar pretends to be dead before he kills the handler and begins the revolt. Within hours, the city is in flames, the police and military have been beaten down, and the apes are now in control. Caesar predicts that word will spread of his revolution and the same thing will soon happen around the world. Despite MacDonald's pleas to prevent further violence, Caesar declares that humanity will destroy itself and the apes will become the masters of the world, only to cease when Lisa musters the ability to speak, convincing Caesar not to condemn all of humanity.

In Battle for the Planet of the Apes, 29 years after Caesar led the revolt in Conquest and 12 years after the world got destroyed by a nuclear war, Caesar took his apes and the remaining captive humans and they started a new civilization together. Even though apes and humans are coexisting in peace, a gorilla named Aldo is the only one who opposes Caesar and despises the humans. Wanting to know about his parents, Caesar travels to the ruined city to find the archives about his parents, where he is accompanied by MacDonald, the younger brother of the late MacDonald from Conquest and his ape advisor Virgil. After learning who they are and about the eventual destruction of Earth, Caesar manages to escape the city when he, MacDonald and Virgil get attacked by a group of mutated, radiation-scarred humans led by Governor Kolp who have survived and are living in the city. Meanwhile, Aldo plots to overthrow Caesar and have the gorillas take control of the ape-human village, where Caesar's son Cornelius eavesdrops on Aldo, who kills the young ape in the process. Taking advantage of Caesar's grief and absence, Aldo has all the humans in the village imprisoned and raids the armory to prepare for battle against the mutated humans and to overthrow Caesar.

When Kolp and the mutated humans launch an attack on the village, Caesar and the apes manage to defeat and capture most of them, where Kolp and his remaining forces try to escape but they get killed by Aldo and his troops. Caesar tries to defend the imprisoned humans when Aldo tries to kill the rest of the humans and threatens Caesar. When Virgil reveals that Aldo has killed Cornelius, Caesar becomes furious and chases him up a tree, which results in Aldo falling to his death. Realizing that apes are no different from humans, Caesar agrees with MacDonald that humans are to be treated as equals in order to coexist.

The movie is told as a flashback, where the beginning and ending scene takes place 600 years after Caesar's death and it shows the Lawgiver telling a story to a group of both ape and human children. He tells them the story about how Caesar fought a battle that solidified his position as ape leader and convinced him to give a joint ape-human society a chance, instead of one species dominating the other. Screenwriter Paul Dehn said the tear on Caesar's statue at the end of the film was to tell the audience that Caesar's efforts ultimately failed.

=== Comic series ===
In Tarzan on the Planet of the Apes, following an alternate take on Escape from the Planet of the Apes, where Cornelius, Zira and Dr. Milo traveled to late-1800s Africa instead of the 1970s, the apes become the leaders of the Mangani, and Caesar and the human Tarzan are raised as brothers. However, as Tarzan grows up and humans arrive in the jungle, the brothers are separated by slave traders, reuniting only when the war between man and ape takes them from the jungles of Africa to the inner earth realm of Pellucidar.

=== Reboot series ===
Caesar is the main protagonist of the reboot series, sharing the previous version's compassionate nature while forbidding his followers from killing innocent humans and those who don't seek to harm them. However unlike his original incarnation, he doesn't seek for global conquest and to enslave humanity for he sees both man and apes as unlikely equals, indicating that his bloodline will watch over the humans that survived the Simian Flu, who are now devolved of intelligence and reverted to animal instincts.

First appearing in Rise of the Planet of the Apes, Caesar is the son of a female chimpanzee Bright Eyes who was taken from the African wild to the pharmaceutical company Gen-Sys in the San Francisco Bay Area to be subjected to an experimental viral-based cure of Alzheimer's known as ALZ-112. Developed by Will Rodman, ALZ-112 genetically increases Bright Eyes' intelligence that gets passed onto Caesar as he was still in his mother's womb. When born, Caesar ends up orphaned after his mother is killed trying to protect him, an action mistaken by lab security after she runs amok, which labels the experiment a failure. Caesar is saved by sympathetic ape handler Franklin, after which Will smuggles the little ape out of the lab and takes him back home. Will's father Charles, who has Alzheimer's disease, names him after Julius Caesar. Discovering that Caesar has inherited his mother's intelligence through being exposed to ALZ-112, Will decides to raise him. Following an incident where he attacks their aggressive neighbor who threatens Charles, Caesar is forced to stay at the San Bruno Primate Shelter, an ape sanctuary where he is tormented by one of the caretakers while gradually taking command of the apes, while also developing a close friendship with a Bornean orangutan named Maurice. Caesar eventually proves smart enough when he breaks free from his cage, steals the ALZ-113, a stronger version of the intelligence-enhancing formula and releases it among the other captive apes. After saying his first word "No!" in a confrontation with one of the caretakers, Caesar leads the apes out of the sanctuary as they recruit other captive apes from the zoo and from Gen-Sys, rallying them to escape San Francisco and make their way to the Muir Woods while clashing with the police. Once in the Muir Woods, Caesar shares an emotional farewell with Rodman as he decides to live free among his own kind.

In Dawn of the Planet of the Apes, set ten years after the ALZ-113 virus decimated most of the human population, Caesar is now middle-aged and mated to Cornelia. They have two sons, Blue Eyes and a newborn, Cornelius. While assuming the humans to have died out, Caesar discovers that humans are still alive when he sees a group from the remnants of San Francisco entering their territory and personally warns them to stay out. When the group's leader Malcolm explains they are trying to repair a dam to return power to the city, Caesar allows them to do their work. Despite the successful repairing of the dam and the growing friendship between apes and humans, Koba, a bonobo, becomes disillusioned with Caesar after seeing his leader's compassion and respect for the humans. He shoots Caesar, framing the humans, and leads the apes into attacking the humans and their colony. Caesar survives the gunshot and is nursed back to health by Malcolm's wife, Ellie. Blue Eyes helps Caesar free his loyal allies before Caesar confronts Koba and ultimately kills him. As the military arrives, having been called during Koba's takeover, Caesar realizes that the damage has already been done. He convinces Malcolm to flee with his family as he and his clan prepare to fight the military.

In War for the Planet of the Apes, two years after the events of Dawn, Caesar and the apes are fighting in an ongoing war with Alpha-Omega, a paramilitary group. After a recent victory in the Muir Woods, Caesar, in an attempt to make peace, spares the lives of soldier Preacher and three other soldiers. He sends them back to Alpha-Omega's leader, Colonel J. Wesley McCullough. After the battle, Blue Eyes and Rocket return from a journey, where they have discovered a place within the desert that can be safe for the apes. Later, the Colonel launches an assault on the apes' home, where he kills Cornelia and Blue Eyes, leaving only Cornelius alive. Leaving Cornelius in the care of Blue Eyes' mate Lake, Caesar departs to confront McCullough, accompanied by Maurice, Luca and Rocket, while the other apes head for the desert. After unintentionally killing the albino western lowland gorilla Winter for betraying the location of the apes to the humans, Caesar fears that his desire for vengeance may cause him to end up like Koba. He and the group are joined by a mute girl named Nova and an ape hermit named Bad Ape. When Caesar reaches Alpha-Omega's base, a former weapons depot that was turned into a relocation facility when the virus began to spread, he discovers that his clan has been captured by McCullough and he gets captured as well. Witnessing his fellow apes being forced to build a wall, Caesar learns that McCullough is fending off rival military forces who seek to destroy him for killing humans, including his own men, who are infected with a mutated strain of ALZ-113 that is making them devolve into mute primitives. While Caesar is tortured with hypothermia and starvation, Nova sneaks into the facility to give him food and water. Caesar, together with Rocket, Bad Ape and Maurice, free the apes from their cages and help them escape via an underground tunnel that leads out of the facility. Caesar sends his followers away while he confronts McCullough, but the facility is attacked by the military forces. Caesar reaches McCullough, but he spares his life upon realizing that he has succumbed to the infection. He watches McCullough, who would rather die than become a primitive, take his own life. In a battle among Caesar's apes, Alpha-Omega and the military forces, Caesar detonates the facility's fuel supply before joining the others in taking refuge when an oncoming avalanche wipes out the remaining soldiers. Departing the facility, the remaining apes cross the desert and settle in an oasis. With Caesar dying from a wound that Preacher inflicted on him, he accepts his end with grace and dies peacefully while Maurice promises Caesar that Cornelius will know who his father was, what he stood for and what he did to protect the apes. The opening scene of Kingdom of the Planet of the Apes reveals that Caesar's body was cremated on a funeral pyre shortly after his death.

== Reception ==
Andy Serkis's performance as Caesar in the rebooted Planet of the Apes trilogy garnered massive critical acclaim. Andrew Howley from National Geographic has compared Caesar's evolution to that of natural human evolution. Fans have embraced Caesar as one of the best film characters of the 2010s, as well as one of the most impressive displays of visual effects in cinema. Many fans were upset due to the lack of Academy Award nominations Serkis received for his performance. In particular, fans were upset that Serkis was not nominated for Best Actor for his performance in War for the Planet of the Apes.

=== Accolades ===
Serkis's performance as Caesar gained many nominations for several awards. Serkis won the Saturn Award for Best Supporting Actor for his performance in Rise of the Planet of the Apes, as well as nominations Empire Award for Best Actor, Broadcast Film Critics Association award for Best Supporting Actor, and the Satellite Award for Best Supporting Actor in a Motion Picture.

For his performance in Dawn of the Planet of the Apes, Serkis was nominated for the AACTA International Award for Best Supporting Actor, won the Empire Award for Best Actor, as well as being nominated again for the Saturn Award for Best Supporting Actor.

For his performance in War For the Planet of the Apes, Serkis was nominated for the Saturn Award for Best Actor, and won many awards from the Washington D.C. Area Film Critics Association, San Francisco Film Critics Circle, Utah Film Critics Association, Los Angeles Online Film Critics Society, and the Houston Film Critics Society award for Best Actor.

== See also ==
- List of fictional primates
