= Conquest of the Planet of the Apes =

1972 science fiction film directed by J. Lee Thompson

- Theatrical release poster
- Directed by: J. Lee Thompson
- Written by: Paul Dehn
- Based on: Characters by Pierre Boulle
- Produced by: Arthur P. Jacobs
- Starring: Roddy McDowall; Don Murray; Ricardo Montalbán; Natalie Trundy; Hari Rhodes
- Cinematography: Bruce Surtees
- Edited by: Marjorie Fowler; Alan L. Jaggs
- Music by: Tom Scott
- Production company: APJAC Productions
- Distributed by: 20th Century-Fox
- Release date: June 14, 1972
- Running time: 88 minutes
- Country: United States
- Language: English
- Budget: $1.7 million
- Box office: $9.7 million

Conquest of the Planet of the Apes is a 1972 American science fiction film directed by J. Lee Thompson and written by Paul Dehn. The film is the sequel to Escape from the Planet of the Apes (1971) and the fourth installment in the original Planet of the Apes film series. It stars Roddy McDowall, Don Murray, Ricardo Montalbán, Natalie Trundy, and Hari Rhodes. In the film, set in a world that has embraced ape slavery, Caesar (McDowall), the son of the late simians Cornelius and Zira, surfaces out of hiding from the authorities and prepares for a rebellion against humanity.

Conquest of the Planet of the Apes was released in the United States on June 14, 1972, by 20th Century-Fox. The film received mixed reviews from critics. It was followed by Battle for the Planet of the Apes in 1973.

== Plot ==
Following a worldwide pandemic from a space-borne disease that wiped out all dogs and cats in 1983, the government in the year 1991 has become a series of Schutzstaffel-patterned police states that took chimpanzees, gorillas, and orangutans as pets before establishing a culture based on ape slave labor. These events were foretold in 1973 as testimony by two chimpanzee scientists who came from the distant future, Cornelius and Zira, before they were killed. Widely believed to be dead, their baby was secretly raised by the circus owner Armando as a young horseback rider. In 1991, now fully grown and named Caesar, the ape is brought to one of the cities to distribute flyers for Armando's circus. During their trip, Armando advises Caesar not to speak in public for fear of his life.

After seeing a gorilla being beaten and drugged, Caesar shouts "Lousy human bastards!". Armando attempts to defuse the ensuing commotion by taking responsibility for the exclamation. He plans to turn himself in to the authorities and bluff his way out while instructing Caesar to hide among the apes for safety. Caesar obeys and hides in a cage of orangutans, finding himself being trained for slavery through violent conditioning. He is then sold at auction to Governor Breck. Caesar is then put to work by Breck's chief aide MacDonald, whose African-American heritage allows him to sympathize with the apes to the disgust of his boss.

Meanwhile, Armando is interrogated by Inspector Kolp, who suspects his "circus ape" is the child of Cornelius and Zira. Kolp's assistant puts Armando under a machine that psychologically forces people to be truthful. Realizing he cannot fight the machine, Armando jumps through a window and dies. When Caesar learns of Armando's death, he loses faith in human kindness. In secret, he begins teaching the apes combat and has them gather weapons.

Unfortunately, Breck eventually learns that Caesar is the ape the police are hunting. Meanwhile, Caesar realizes MacDonald is an ally to the apes' cause and reveals himself to him. MacDonald understands Caesar's intent to depose Breck, but expresses his doubts about the revolution's effectiveness. Caesar is later captured by Breck's men and is electrically tortured into speaking. Hearing him speak, Breck orders Caesar to be killed. With MacDonald's help, Caesar manages to trick Breck into believing he died. Once Breck leaves, Caesar kills his torturer and escapes.

To build his numbers, Caesar takes over Ape Management. While setting the city on fire, Caesar and the rest of the apes proceed to the command center, killing most of the riot police that attempt to stop them in the process. After succeeding in this, Caesar has Breck marched out to be executed. MacDonald pleads with Caesar not to succumb to brutality and be merciful to the former masters.

As the apes raise their rifles to beat Breck to death, Caesar's girlfriend Lisa voices her objection, saying "No!" She is the first ape to speak other than Caesar, but the other apes are concerned about Caesar's bloodlust as well. Caesar reconsiders and orders the apes to lower their weapons, deciding that they can afford to be humane, since the fight is already won and they "have seen the birth of the planet of the apes".

== Original ending ==
In the original ending of the film Caesar ignores MacDonald's pleas, and instead dedicates his life to man's downfall. Following a poor reception from preview audiences the ending was reworked with the dubbed follow-up.

== Cast ==
- Roddy McDowall as Caesar
- Don Murray as Governor Breck
- Ricardo Montalbán as Armando
- Natalie Trundy as Lisa
- Hari Rhodes as MacDonald
- Severn Darden as Kolp
- Lou Wagner as busboy
- John Randolph as commission chairman
- Asa Maynor as Mrs. Riley
- H. M. Wynant as Hoskyns
- David Chow as Aldo
- Buck Kartalian as Frank (Gorilla)
- John Dennis as policeman
- Paul Comi as second policeman
- Gordon Jump as auctioneer
- Dick Spangler as announcer

== Production ==
J. Lee Thompson, who had maintained an interest in the franchise ever since producer Arthur P. Jacobs invited him for the original Planet of the Apes, was hired to direct Conquest of the Planet of the Apes. Thompson had worked with Jacobs on two earlier films, What a Way to Go! and The Chairman, as well as during the initial stages of Planet, but scheduling conflicts had made him unavailable during its long development process.

Thompson staged every scene with attention to detail, such as highlighting the conflicts with color: the humans wear black and other muted colors, while the apes' suits are colorful. Don Murray suggested to Thompson his wardrobe with a black turtleneck sweater, and rehearsed his scenes after translating his dialogue into German "to get this kind of severe feeling of the Nazis". Screenwriter Paul Dehn wrote the film incorporating references to the racial conflicts in North America during the early 1970s, which Thompson further highlighted by shooting some scenes in a manner similar to a news broadcast. The primary location was Century City, Los Angeles, that had previously been part of the 20th Century-Fox backlot and translated well the bleak future with monochromatic buildings in a sterile ultramodern style. Also used as a shooting location was the University of California, Irvine, in Orange County. In addition, TV producer Irwin Allen contributed props and clothes to the film: he let the makers of 'Conquest' borrow his Seaview jumpsuits from Voyage to the Bottom of the Sea, brown clothes and computers and cabinets for Ape Management that were used first on The Time Tunnel and other sets and props from other Allen productions.

Of the five original films, Conquest is the only entry filmed in Todd-AO 35 using Arriflex ARRI 35IIC cameras with lenses provided by the Carl Zeiss Group; the other Apes pictures were filmed in Panavision.

=== Original opening and ending ===
The original cut of Conquest ended with the apes' execution of Governor Breck. After a preview screening in Phoenix on June 1, 1972, the impact of the graphic content caused the producers to rework the film, even though they did not have the budget to do so. Roddy McDowall recorded a complement to Caesar's final speech, which was portrayed through editing tricks - Caesar being mostly shown through close-ups of his eyes, the gorillas hitting Breck with the butt ends of rifles played backwards to imply they were acquiescing to Caesar's directive of non-violence - and assured a lower rating. The film's Blu-ray version adds an unrated version, restoring the original ending and many other graphic scenes. The unrated version is 117,5 seconds shorter than the original theatrical version and has a running time of 86 minutes.

Conquest is the only Apes film without a pre-title sequence. The film's script and novelization describes a nighttime pre-title scene where police on night patrol shoot an escaping ape and discover that his body is covered with welts and bruises as evidence of severe abuse (in a later scene Governor Breck refers to the "ape that physically assaulted his master," thereby prompting MacDonald to report that the escape must have been the result of severe mistreatment). The scene appears in the first chapter of John Jakes's novelization of the film, and in the Marvel Comics adaption of the film in the early 1970s, both of which were probably based directly on the screenplay and not on the final edit of the actual film. An article in the Summer 1972 issue of Cinefantastique (volume 2, issue 2) by Dale Winogura shows and describes the scene being shot, but it is unknown why it was cut. The Blu-ray extended cut does not contain the pre-credit opening.

=== Continuity ===
Screenplay writer Paul Dehn, who wrote and co-wrote the sequels, said in interviews with Cinefantastique (quoted in The Planet of the Apes Chronicles, by Paul Woods) that the story he was writing had a circular timeline:

The whole thing has become a very logical development in the form of a circle. I have a complete chronology of the time circle mapped out, and when I start a new script, I check every supposition I make against the chart to see if it is correct to use it...While I was out there [in California], Arthur Jacobs said he thought this would be the last so I fitted it together so that it fitted in with the beginning of Apes One, so that the wheel had come full circle and one could stop there quite happily, I think?

— January 1972

== Reception ==
Howard Thompson of The New York Times wrote that "J. Lee Thompson's direction furiously propels the action in a compact chromium-and-glass setting—and wait till you see that last battle royal." Arthur Murphy of Variety wrote, "McDowall is extremely good as usual in simian character, and Thompson's staging keeps the pace very lively." Gene Siskel of the Chicago Tribune gave the film 2.5 stars out of four, calling it "excellent in the first half hour," but found "the concluding action sequences run on too long without any original slashing, maiming, or setting on fire." Kevin Thomas of the Los Angeles Times wrote that the film "may be the best since No. 1, 'Planet of the Apes'," calling it "a self-contained allegory in which man's cruelty to beasts becomes symbolic of man's inhumanity to man. It is a simple but powerful premise, thoroughly developed with a good balance between dialog and action by Dehn and splendidly directed by J. Lee Thompson." Clyde Jeavons of The Monthly Film Bulletin wrote, "This comic-book adventure is a far cry from the provocative Pierre Boulle vision so impressively realised by Franklin Schaffner four films ago; and in spite of some crude allegorical pretensions, it can't really be considered seriously as more than another excuse by APJAC to get maximum wear out of an expensive set of costumes."

On Rotten Tomatoes, the film has an approval rating of 52% based on 23 reviews. The critical consensus reads: "Conquest of the Planet of the Apes is as angry and relevant as any of its predecessors, but budget constraints and a stale script rob this revolution of the scope it requires." On Metacritic, the film received an average score of 49 out of 100 based on 6 critics, indicating "mixed or average reviews."

=== Box office ===
The film earned $4.5 million in theatrical rentals at the North American box office.

== See also ==
- List of American films of 1972
