= Roddy McDowall =

British-American actor (1928–1998)

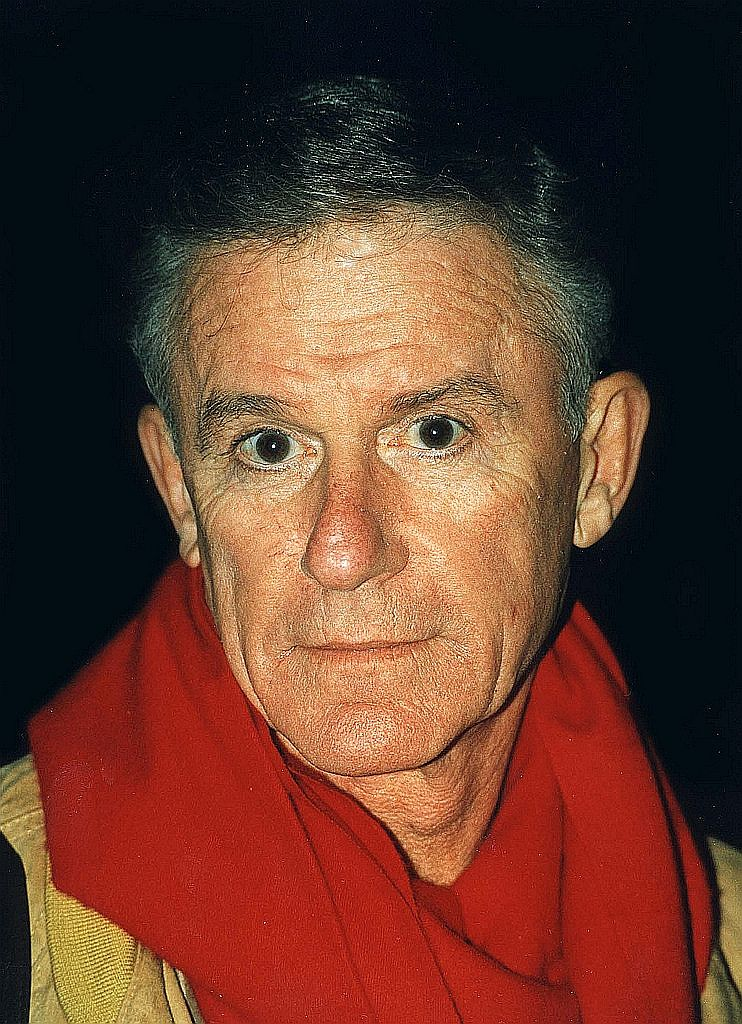
- McDowall in 1997
- Born: Roderick Andrew Anthony Jude McDowall; 17 September 1928; London, England
- Died: 3 October 1998 (aged 70); Los Angeles, California, US
- Citizenship: United Kingdom; United States (after 1949)
- Education: St Joseph's College
- Occupation: Actor
- Years active: 1938–1998
- Political party: Democratic
- Partner: Montgomery Clift (1950s)
- Military career
- Allegiance: United States
- Branch: United States Army; United States Army Reserve
- Service years: 1946–1954; 1960–1962
- Rank: Corporal
- Unit: 67th Battalion, 13th Armored Division; 63rd Infantry Division; 77th Sustainment Brigade
- Conflicts: Korean War

Roderick Andrew Anthony Jude McDowall (17 September 1928 – 3 October 1998) was a British and American actor, with a career spanning six decades on stage and screen. Following early roles as a child star in his native England, he appeared in the American films How Green Was My Valley (1941), My Friend Flicka (1943), and Lassie Come Home (1943). As an adult, McDowall won a Tony Award for his performance in Jean Anouilh's The Fighting Cock (1959–60), played Mordred in the Broadway musical Camelot (1960–61), and was nominated for a Golden Globe for his performance in Cleopatra (1963).

He subsequently appeared in a variety of film and television roles, notably as Cornelius and Caesar in the Planet of the Apes films (1968–73) and Galen in the spin-off television series, as well as The Greatest Story Ever Told (1965), Bedknobs and Broomsticks (1971), The Poseidon Adventure (1972), The Legend of Hell House (1973), The Fantastic Journey (1977), Fright Night (1985), Overboard (1987), A Bug's Life (1998), and as the voice of Jervis Tetch / Mad Hatter in the DC Animated Universe.

McDowall served in various positions on the board of governors for the Academy of Motion Picture Arts and Sciences and the selection committee for the Kennedy Center Honors, contributing to various charities related to the film industry and film preservation. He was a founding member of the National Film Preservation Board and represented the Screen Actors Guild on that board until his death. He was also active as a photographer and journalist.

== Early life ==
McDowall was born in Herne Hill, London, the only son of Thomas Andrew McDowall (1896–1978), a merchant seaman, and his Irish wife Winifred (née Corcoran). Both of his parents were enthusiastic about the theatre. McDowall and his elder sister, Virginia, were raised in their mother's Catholic faith. He attended St Joseph's College, Beulah Hill, Upper Norwood, a Roman Catholic secondary school in London.

== Career ==
=== British films ===
After appearing as a child model as a baby, and winning an acting prize in a school play at age nine, McDowell started appearing in films, including I See Ice (1938) with George Formby and Hey! Hey! USA (1938) with Will Hay.

=== Early US films ===
McDowall and his sister were taken to the United States by their mother after the outbreak of World War II. He became a naturalised United States citizen on 9 December 1949 and lived in the United States for the rest of his life.

McDowall served in the U.S. Army Reserves, and after basic training, was assigned to the 67th Armored Infantry Battalion, 13th Armored Division of the U.S. Army's Organized Reserve Corps headquartered in Los Angeles. Later, he was assigned to the 63rd Infantry Division. McDowall served from 1946 to 1954, spanning from the end of World War II to the end of the Korean War. He then served in the 77th Infantry Division from 1960 to 1962.

McDowall's American film career began with the 1941 thriller Man Hunt, directed by Fritz Lang. It was made by 20th Century Fox, which also produced McDowall's next film, How Green Was My Valley (1941), on which he and Maureen O'Hara became lifelong friends. The film won the Academy Award for Best Picture, and McDowall's role as Huw Morgan made him a household name.

=== Stardom ===
McDowall in Lassie Come Home (1943)

Fox promoted McDowall to top billing for On the Sunny Side (1942), and he was top billed again for an adaptation of My Friend Flicka (1942). Metro-Goldwyn-Mayer borrowed McDowall for the star role in Lassie Come Home (1943) with Elizabeth Taylor, who became another lifelong friend, and kept him for a leading role in The White Cliffs of Dover (1944). In 1944, exhibitors voted McDowall the number-four "Star of Tomorrow" after which Fox gave McDowall another starring vehicle, Thunderhead, Son of Flicka (1945).

=== Theatre ===
McDowall turned to the theatre, taking the title role of Young Woodley in summer stock in Westport, Connecticut, in July 1946. In 1947, he played Malcolm in Orson Welles's stage production of Macbeth in Salt Lake City, and reprised the role in the actor-director's film version in 1948.

=== Monogram Pictures ===
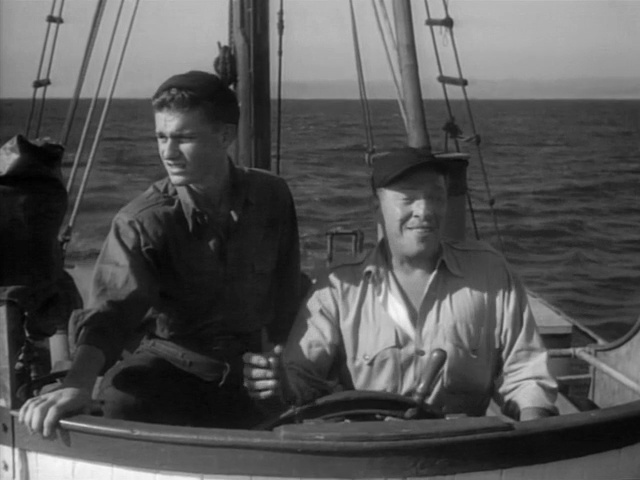
McDowall and Roland Winters in Killer Shark (1950)

McDowall then signed a three-year contract with Monogram Pictures to make two films a year. He starred in seven films at Monogram, for which he also worked as associate producer, including Kidnapped (1948), an adaptation of the Robert Louis Stevenson story, wherein he played David Balfour.

=== 1950s: Television and theatre ===
After relocating to New York City, McDowall became a frequent presence in live television drama, appearing in numerous televised plays and anthology series throughout the 1950s. He also had a significant career on Broadway, including a production of Misalliance (1953) that he said "broke the mould" in how he was judged as an actor. Ira Levin's No Time for Sergeants (1955–57) was a major hit, followed by a critical success with Compulsion (1957–58) based on the Leopold and Loeb case, after which McDowell won a Tony Award for Peter Brook's The Fighting Cock (1960).

=== 1960: Return to Hollywood ===
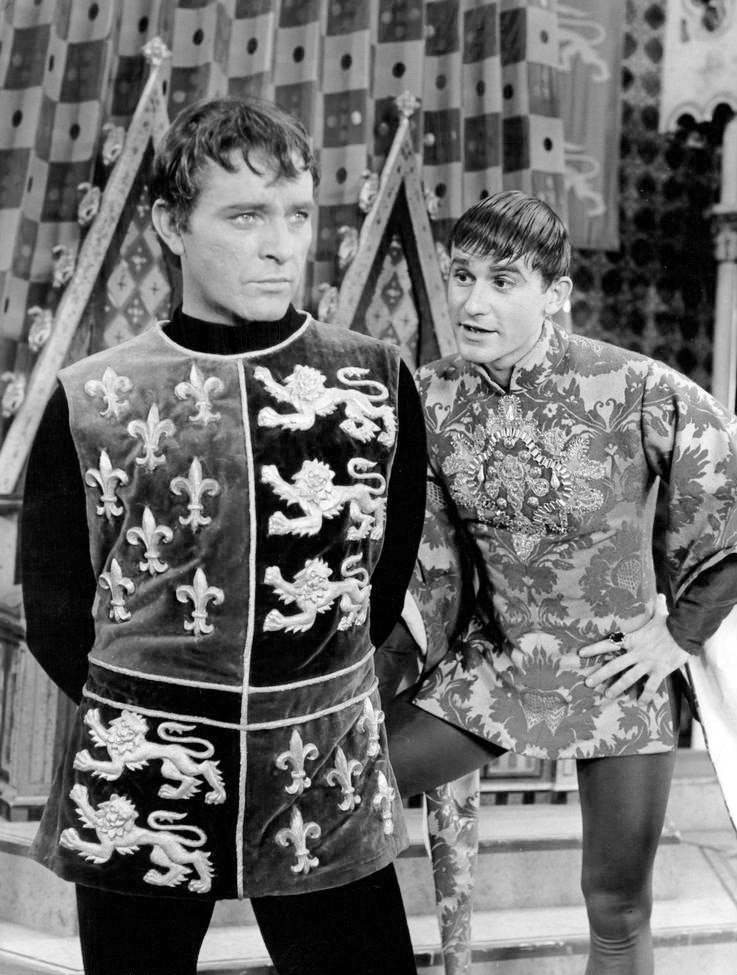
McDowall as Mordred with Richard Burton in the Broadway musical Camelot (1960)

McDowall enjoyed another big hit on Broadway with the musical Camelot (1960–63), which starred Julie Andrews and Richard Burton. He took part in a TV production of The Tempest (1960) alongside Burton and Maurice Evans, before appearing in his first film in almost a decade, The Subterraneans (1960), followed by Midnight Lace (1960). He was also seen in The Longest Day (1962) prior to his portrayal of Octavian in Cleopatra. He worked in film throughout the decade, notably in The Greatest Story Ever Told (1965), Inside Daisy Clover (1965), Lord Love a Duck (1966), and 5 Card Stud (1968), though his most memorable role was as Cornelius in Planet of the Apes. He appeared in three Planet of the Apes sequels and the TV series.

McDowall continued to work regularly in television, including his Emmy-winning turn in Sunday Showcase and a production of The Power and the Glory (1961) with Laurence Olivier, George C. Scott, and Julie Harris.

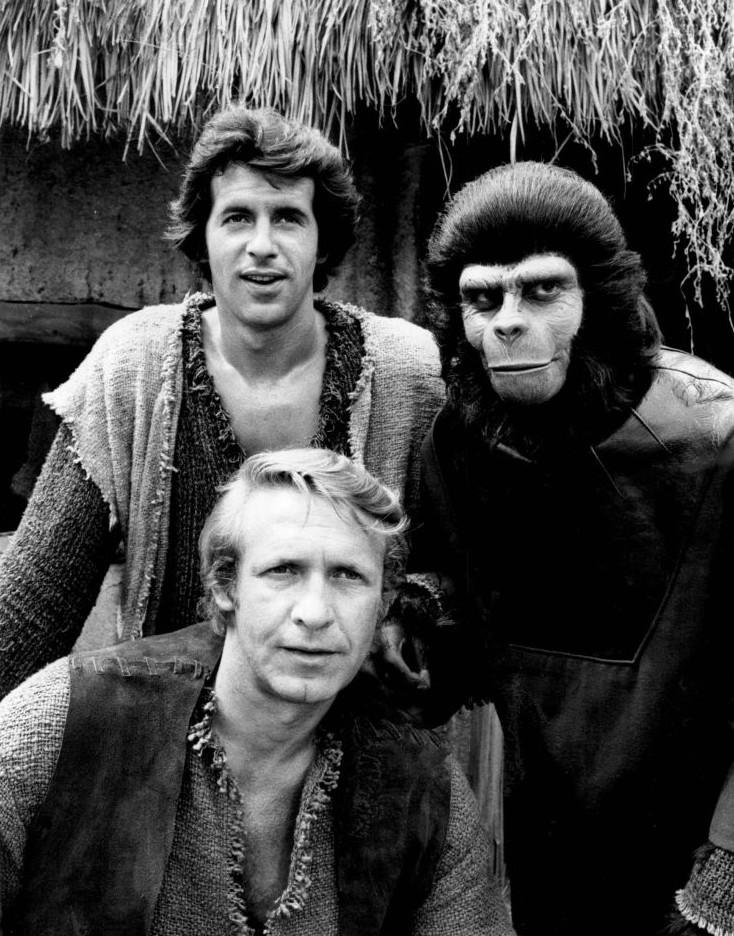
McDowall in full costume, with co-stars Ron Harper (front) and James Naughton (back), in the Planet of the Apes TV series (1974)

=== 1970s–1990s ===
McDowall made his lone effort as a director with Tam Lin (1970, also known as The Ballad of Tam Lin and The Devil's Widow). As an actor, he was in Pretty Maids All in a Row (1971), Escape from the Planet of the Apes (1971), and Disney's Bedknobs and Broomsticks (1971). In addition to his television work, most significantly in Columbo, he made his third Apes film as Caesar, son of his earlier character, Cornelius, in 1972's Conquest of the Planet of the Apes. He took supporting roles in The Life and Times of Judge Roy Bean (1972) and The Poseidon Adventure (1972) before his final Apes film, Battle for the Planet of the Apes (1973). During the short-lived TV spin-off of Planet of the Apes (1974), he made a guest appearance on The Carol Burnett Show in his Planet of the Apes makeup and performed a love duet with Burnett.

Asked about his career in a 1975 interview, McDowall said, "I just hope to keep working and in interesting things." For the rest of his life, he alternated between features, TV films, and guesting on TV series, including Overboard, on which he also served as executive producer.

In 1989, he said, "I feel as Henry Fonda did that every job I get may be my last. I'm one of those creatures born to be working. I feel better when I'm working. I don't like it when I'm not working and I've never worked as much as I want to."

He was the subject of This Is Your Life in 1993, when he was surprised by Michael Aspel at the Pacific Design Center in West Hollywood.

In one of his final public appearances, McDowall hosted the MGM Musicals Tribute at Carnegie Hall in 1997.

== Other work ==
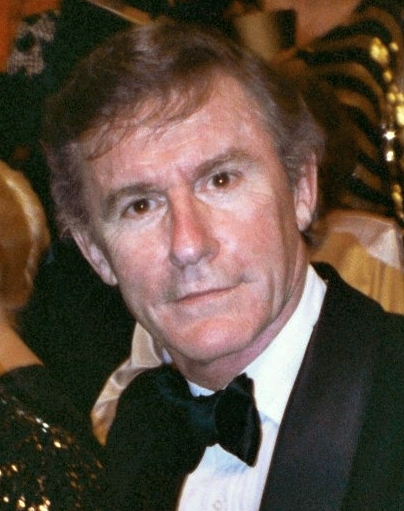
McDowall in 1988

=== Academy of Motion Picture Arts and Sciences ===
McDowall served for several years in various capacities on the board of governors of the Academy of Motion Picture Arts and Sciences, the organization that presents the Academy Awards (Oscars), and on the selection committee for the Kennedy Center Awards. He was chairman of the Actors' Branch for five terms. He was elected president of the Academy Foundation in 1998, the year that he died. He worked to support the Motion Pictures Retirement Home, where a rose garden named in his honour was officially dedicated on 9 October 2001. It remains part of the campus.

=== Photographer and author ===
McDowall received recognition as a photographer, working with Look, Vogue, Collier's, and Life. His work includes a cover story on Mae West for Life and the cover of the 1964 Barbra Streisand album, The Third Album. He took the photograph when Streisand performed on The Judy Garland Show in October 1963.

He published five books of photographs, each featuring photos and profile interviews of his celebrity friends interviewing each other, such as Elizabeth Taylor, Judy Garland, Judy Holliday, Maureen O'Hara, Katharine Hepburn, Lauren Bacall, and others, starting with Double Exposure in 1968.

== Honours ==
For his contributions to television, McDowall received a star on the Hollywood Walk of Fame in 1960, at 6632 Hollywood Blvd.

== Personal life ==
McDowall had a close relationship with American actor Montgomery Clift. McDowall had been introduced to Clift by mutual friend Elizabeth Taylor. McDowall’s relationship with Clift overlapped with Clift's relationship with actor Judy Balaban, during which McDowall would occasionally accompany them on public outings. Balaban has said she was ignorant of Clift's sexual orientation and his close relationship with McDowall. During the two and a half years that Clift stayed away from films, McDowall's career was also nonexistent. He devoted himself entirely to Clift and moved from Los Angeles to New York City to be closer to his idol.

McDowall appeared with Clift in Clift’s final movie, The Defector. Clift later stated that he could never have finished the film without McDowall's moral support. McDowall sent flowers to Clift’s funeral after his sudden death.

In 1974, the FBI raided McDowall's home and seized his collection of films and television series in the course of an investigation into film piracy and copyright infringement. His collection consisted of 160 16mm prints and more than 1000 video cassettes, at a time before the era of commercial videotapes, when no legal aftermarket existed for film. McDowall had purchased Errol Flynn's home cinema films and transferred them all to tape for longer-lasting archival storage. No charges were filed.

=== Death ===
McDowall was diagnosed with cancer, and died on 3 October 1998, aged 70. His body was cremated and his ashes were scattered into the Pacific Ocean on 7 October 1998, off Los Angeles County. Dennis Osborne, a screenwriter, cared for McDowall in his final months, and was quoted as saying, "It was very peaceful. It was just as he wanted it. It was exactly the way he planned."

== Filmography ==
=== Film ===
Year	Title	Role	Notes
1938	Convict 99	Jimmy	
1938	Murder in the Family	Peter Osborne	
1938	John Halifax	Boy	
1939	Poison Pen	Choir Boy	Uncredited
1940	His Brother's Keeper	Boy	
1940	Dead Man's Shoes	Boy	
1940	Just William	Ginger	
1940	Saloon Bar	Boy	
1941	You Will Remember	Young Bob Slater	
1941	Man Hunt	Vaner	
1941	This England	Hugo	
1941	How Green Was My Valley	Huw Morgan	
1941	Confirm or Deny	Albert Perkins	
1942	Son of Fury: The Story of Benjamin Blake	Young Benjamin Blake	
1942	On the Sunnyside	Hugh Aylesworth	
1942	The Pied Piper	Ronnie Cavanaugh	
1943	My Friend Flicka	Ken McLaughlin	
1943	Lassie Come Home	Joe Carraclough	
1944	The White Cliffs of Dover	Young John Ashwood	
1944	The Keys of the Kingdom	Young Francis Chisholm	
1945	Thunderhead, Son of Flicka	Ken McLaughlin	
1945	Molly and Me	Jimmy Graham	
1946	Holiday in Mexico	Stanley Owen	
1948	Rocky	Chris Hammond	
1948	Macbeth	Malcolm	
1948	Kidnapped	David Balfour	
1949	Tuna Clipper	Alec MacLennan	
1949	Black Midnight	Scott Jordan	
1950	Big Timber	Jimmy	
1950	Killer Shark	Ted	
1952	The Steel Fist	Eric Kardin	
1958	The Big Country	Hannassey Watchman	Uncredited
1960	The Subterraneans	Yuri Gilgoric	
1960	Midnight Lace	Malcolm Stanley	
1962	The Longest Day	Pvt. Morris	
1963	Cleopatra	Octavian	
1964	Shock Treatment	Martin Ashley	
1965	The Greatest Story Ever Told	Matthew	
1965	That Darn Cat!	Gregory Benson	
1965	The Third Day	Oliver Parsons	
1965	The Loved One	D.J. Jr.	
1965	Inside Daisy Clover	Walter Baines	
1966	Lord Love a Duck	Alan Musgrave	
1966	The Defector	Agent Adams	
1967	The Adventures of Bullwhip Griffin	Bullwhip Griffin	
1967	The Cool Ones	Tony Krum	
1967	It!	Arthur Pimm	
1968	Planet of the Apes	Cornelius	
1968	5 Card Stud	Nick Evers	
1969	Midas Run	Wister	
1969	Hello Down There	Nate Ashbury	
1969	Angel, Angel, Down We Go	Santoro	
1970	Tam Lin	-	Director. McDowall's only directorial outing.
1971	Pretty Maids All in a Row	Proffer	
1971	Escape from the Planet of the Apes	Cornelius	
1971	Terror in the Sky	Ralph Baird	
1971	Bedknobs and Broomsticks	Rowan Jelk	
1972	Conquest of the Planet of the Apes	Caesar	
1972	The Life and Times of Judge Roy Bean	Frank Gass	
1972	The Poseidon Adventure	Acres	
1973	Arnold	Robert	
1973	The Legend of Hell House	Benjamin Franklin Fischer	
1973	Battle for the Planet of the Apes	Caesar	
1974	Dirty Mary, Crazy Larry	Grocery Store Manager	
1975	Funny Lady	Bobby	
1976	Mean Johnny Barrows	Tony Da Vince	
1976	Embryo	Frank Riley	
1977	Sixth and Main	Skateboard	
1978	Laserblast	Dr. Mellon	
1978	The Cat from Outer Space	Mr. Stallwood	
1978	Circle of Iron	White Robe	
1978	The Thief of Baghdad	Hasan	
1979	Scavenger Hunt	Jenkins	
1979	Nutcracker Fantasy	Franz/Fritz	
1979	The Black Hole	V.I.N.CENT. (voice)	
1981	Charlie Chan and the Curse of the Dragon Queen	Gillespie	
1982	Evil Under the Sun	Rex Brewster	
1982	Class of 1984	Terry Corrigan	
1985	Fright Night	Peter Vincent	
1986	GoBots: Battle of the Rock Lords	Nuggit (voice)	
1986	Friends Are Forever: Tales of the Little Princess	Zak the Cat (voice)	
1987	Dead of Winter	Mr. Murray	
1987	Overboard	Andrew	
1988	Doin' Time on Planet Earth	Minister	
1988	Fright Night Part 2	Peter Vincent	
1989	The Big Picture	Judge	
1989	Cutting Class	Mr. Dante	
1990	Shakma	Sorenson	
1991	Timmy's Gift: A Precious Moments Christmas	Narrator (voice)	
1991	Going Under	Secretary Neighbor	
1992	Double Trouble	Philip Chamberlain	
1993	The Evil Inside Me	Pauly	
1993	The Return of Captain Sinbad	Narrator (voice)	
1994	Mirror, Mirror II: Raven Dance	Dr. Lasky	
1995	The Grass Harp	Amos Legrand	
1995	The Alien Within	Dr. Henry Lazarus	
1995	Last Summer in the Hamptons	Thomas	
1996	Star Hunter	Riecher	
1996	It's My Party	Damian Knowles	
1997	The Second Jungle Book: Mowgli & Baloo	King Murphy	
1998	Something to Believe In	Gambler	
1998	A Bug's Life	Mr. Soil (voice)	Posthumous release
1998	Star Power: The Creation of United Artists	Narrator (voice)	Posthumous release

=== Television ===
Year	Title	Role	Notes
1951	Family Theatre	Private Huntington (The Professor)	Episode: "Hill Number One: A Story of Faith and Inspiration"
1960	The Twilight Zone	Sam Conrad	Episode: "People Are Alike All Over"
1961	Naked City	Donnie Benton	Episode: "The Fault in Our Stars"
1963	Arrest and Trial	Paul LeDoux	Episode: "Journey into Darkness"
1964	The Alfred Hitchcock Hour	George, Gerald Musgrove	2 episodes
1964	Combat!	Murfree	Episode: "The Long Walk"
1964	Kraft Suspense Theatre	Robert "Professor" Benson	Episode: "The Wine-Dark Sea"
1965	Ben Casey	Dwight Franklin	Episode: "When I am grown to Man's Estate"
1966	12 O'Clock High	Technical Sergeant Willets	Episode: "Angel Babe"
1966	Batman	Bookworm	2 episodes
1966	Run for Your Life	Gyula Bognar	Episode: "Don't Count on Tomorrow"
1967	The Invaders	Lloyd Lindstrom	Episode: "The Experiment"
1969	Journey to the Unknown	Rollo Verdew	Episode: "The Killing Bottle"
1969	It Takes a Thief	Roger	Episode: "Boom at the Top"
1969	Night Gallery	Jeremy Evans	Segment: "The Cemetery"
1969, 1970	The Name of the Game	Philip Saxon, Early McCorley	2 episodes
1972	Columbo	Roger Stanford	Episode: "Short Fuse"
1972	The Rookies: Dirge for Sunday	Fenner	Episode: "Dirge for Sunday"
1972	Mission: Impossible	Leo Ostro	Episode: "The Puppet"
1973–1974	The Carol Burnett Show	Himself – Guest	
1973	Barnaby Jones	Stanley Lambert	Episode: "See Some Evil... Do Some Evil"
1973	McMillan & Wife	Jamie McMillan	Episode: "Death of a Monster... Birth of a Legend"
1974	Planet of the Apes	Galen	14 episodes
1976	Ellery Queen	The Amazing Armitage	Episode: "The Adventure of the Black Falcon"
1976	Mowgli's Brothers	Various (voices)	Television short
1977	The Feather and Father Gang	Vincent Stoddard	Episode: "The Mayan Connection"
1977	The Rhinemann Exchange	Bobby Ballard	3 episodes
1977	The Fantastic Journey	Dr. Jonathan Willoway	8 episodes
1977	Wonder Woman	Henry Roberts, Professor Arthur Chapman	2 episodes
1979	Buck Rogers in the 25th Century	Governor Saroyan	Episode: "Planet of the Slave Girls"
1979	$weepstake$	Theodore	Episode: "Billy, Wally and Ludmilla, and Theodore"
1979	Supertrain	Talcott	Episode: "The Green Lady"
1979	Fantasy Island	Gary Pointer	1 episode
1979	Hart to Hart	Dr. Peterson	Episode: "Hart to Hart"
1979	The Love Boat	Fred Beery	Episode: "Second Chance/Don't Push Me/Like Father, Like Son" S2 E16
1979	Mork & Mindy	Chuck the Robot (voice)	Episode: "Dr. Morkenstein"
1980	The Martian Chronicles	Father Stone	3 episodes
1980–1981	Fantasy Island	Mephistopheles	2 episodes
1982–1983	Tales of the Gold Monkey	Bon Chance Louie	20 episodes
1985	Hollywood Wives	Jason Swankle	3 episodes
1985, 1989	Murder, She Wrote	Gordon Fairchild, Dr. Alger Kenyon	2 episodes
1985	Bridges to Cross	Norman Parks	Episode: "Memories of Molly"
1987, 1989	Matlock	Don Mosher, Christopher Hoyt	2 episodes
1989	Around the World in 80 Days	McBaines	3 episodes
1991	The Pirates of Dark Water	Niddler (voice)	5 episodes
1991	An Inconvenient Woman	Cyril Rathbone	2 episodes
1992	The Legend of Prince Valiant	King Frederick (voice)	Episode: "The Battle of Greystone"
1992	Quantum Leap	Edward St. John V	Episode: "A Leap for Lisa"
1992	Darkwing Duck	Sir Quackmire Mallard (voice)	Episode: "Inherit the Wimp"
1992–1994	Batman: The Animated Series	Jervis Tetch / Mad Hatter (voice)	4 episodes
1993	2 Stupid Dogs	Chameleon (voice)	Episode: "Chameleon"
1993	SWAT Kats: The Radical Squadron	Lenny Ringtail, Madkat (voice)	Episode: "Enter the Madkat"
1994	Red Planet	Headmaster Marcus Howe (voice)	3 episodes
1994	The Tick	Breadmaster (voice)	Episode: "The Tick vs. The Breadmaster"
1996	Tracey Takes On...	Rex Gaydon	Episode: "Nostalgia"
1996	Gargoyles	Proteus (voice)	Episode: "The New Olympians"
1996	Duckman	Akers (voice)	Episode: "Apocalypse Not"
1996	Pinky and the Brain	Snowball (voice)	6 episodes
1998	The New Batman Adventures	Jervis Tetch / Mad Hatter (voice)	2 episodes
1998	Superman: The Animated Series	Jervis Tetch / Mad Hatter (voice)	Episode: "Knight Time"; posthumous role
1998	Behind the Planet of the Apes	Narrator	Television documentary; posthumous role
1999	Godzilla: The Series	Hugh Trevor (voice)	Episode: "DeadLoch"; posthumous role

==== TV films and miniseries ====
Year	Title	Role	Notes
1960	The Tempest	Ariel	
1967	The Cricket on the Hearth	Cricket Crocket (voice)	
1968	The Legend of Robin Hood	Prince John	
1971	Terror in the Sky	Dr. Ralph Baird	
1971	A Taste of Evil	Dr. Michael Lomas	
1971	What's a Nice Girl Like You...?	Albert Soames	
1973	Miracle on 34th Street	Dr. Sawyer	
1974	The Elevator	Marvin Ellis	
1976	Flood!	Mr. Franklin	
1978	The Immigrants	Mark Levy	
1978	The Thief of Baghdad	Hasan	
1980	The Memory of Eva Ryker	MacFarland	
1980	The Return of the King	Samwise Gamgee (voice)	
1981	The Million Dollar Face	Derek Kenyon	
1984	The Zany Adventures of Robin Hood	Prince John	
1985	Alice in Wonderland	March Hare	
1987	The Wind in the Willows	Ratty (voice)	
1988	Remo Williams: The Prophecy	Chuin	
1991	Timmy's Gift: A Precious Moments Christmas	Narrator (voice)	
1994	Hart to Hart: Home Is Where the Hart Is	Jeremy Sennet	
1996	Dead Man's Island	Trevor Dunnaway	
1996	Unlikely Angel	Saint Peter	

== Stage appearances ==
- Young Woodley (1946)
- Macbeth (1947)
- Misalliance (1953)
- Escapade (1953)
- Julius Caesar (1955)
- The Tempest (1955)
- No Time for Sergeants (1955)
- Diary of a Scoundrel (1956)
- Good as Gold (1957)
- Compulsion (1957)
- Handful of Fire (1958)
- Look After Lulu (1959)
- The Fighting Cock (1959)
- Camelot (1960)
- The Astrakhan Coat (1967)
- Charlie's Aunt (1975)
- Dial M for Murder (1995–96)
- A Christmas Carol: The Musical (1997)

== Radio appearances ==
Year	Program	Episode/source	Ref.
1943	Lux Radio Theatre	My Friend Flicka	
1947	Suspense	One Way Street	
1948	The Voyage of the Scarlet Queen	Rocky Iii and the Dead Mans Chest	
1952	Family Theater	A Lullaby for Christmas	

== Awards and nominations ==
Award	Year	Category	Work	Result	Ref.
Golden Globe Awards	1964	Best Supporting Actor – Motion Picture	Cleopatra	Nominated	
National Board of Review Awards	1941	Best Acting	How Green Was My Valley	Won	
Primetime Emmy Awards	1961	Outstanding Performance in a Supporting Role by an Actor or Actress in a Single Program	NBC Sunday Showcase ("Our American Heritage: Not Without Honor")	Won	
Primetime Emmy Awards	1964	Outstanding Single Performance by an Actor in a Leading Role	Arrest and Trial ("Journey into Darkness")	Nominated	
Saturn Awards	1983	Best Supporting Actor	Class of 1984	Nominated	
Saturn Awards	1986	Best Supporting Actor	Fright Night	Won	

== Bibliography ==
- Best, Marc. Those Endearing Young Charms: Child Performers of the Screen (South Brunswick and New York: Barnes & Co., 1971), pp. 176–181.
- Dye, David. Child and Youth Actors: Filmography of Their Entire Careers, 1914–1985. Jefferson, North Carolina: McFarland & Co., 1988, pp. 140–144.
- Holmstrom, John. The Moving Picture Boy: An International Encyclopaedia from 1895 to 1995, Norwich, Michael Russell, 1996, pp. 158–159.
