= 13th Academy Awards =

- Date: February 27, 1941
- Site: Biltmore Bowl, Biltmore Hotel; Los Angeles, California
- Hosted by: Bob Hope

Highlights
- Best Picture: Rebecca
- Most awards: The Thief of Bagdad (3)
- Most nominations: Rebecca (11)

The 13th Academy Awards were held on February 27, 1941, to honor films released in 1940. This was the first year that sealed envelopes were used to keep the names of the winners secret. The accounting firm of Price Waterhouse was hired to count the ballots, after voting results in 1939 were leaked by the Los Angeles Times. The gathering was addressed over the radio by President Franklin D. Roosevelt.

Walter Brennan's victory for his performance in The Westerner made him the first actor to win an Academy Award more than twice.

Best Original Screenplay was introduced at this ceremony, alongside Best Screenplay, which would eventually become Best Adapted Screenplay, and Best Original Story.

Independent producer David O. Selznick, who had produced the previous year's Best Picture winner Gone with the Wind (1939), produced the film with the most nominations again this year, Rebecca (11), and campaigned heavily for its win. The film won Best Picture, making Selznick the first to produce two consecutive winners; its only other win was for Best Cinematography (Black and White), marking the last time to date a film would win Best Picture but not win for either directing, acting, or writing.

The film's distributor, United Artists, was the last of the original film studios (Metro-Goldwyn-Mayer, Columbia, 20th Century-Fox, Warner Bros., RKO Radio, Universal, and Paramount) to win Best Picture. Rebecca was the first American film directed by Alfred Hitchcock, and the only one of his films to win Best Picture. Hitchcock had two films nominated for Best Picture, the other being Foreign Correspondent, and two other directors also had two films in the running: Sam Wood (Our Town and Kitty Foyle) and John Ford (The Long Voyage Home and The Grapes of Wrath, which won Best Director).

Pinocchio was the first animated feature film to win competitive Oscars, for Best Original Score and Best Original Song, starting a long tradition of animated films winning in these categories. The Thief of Bagdad received the most Oscars of the evening (3), the first time a film not nominated for Best Picture won the most awards. This and Pinocchio were the first films not nominated for Best Picture to receive multiple awards in Oscar history.

== Winners and nominees ==
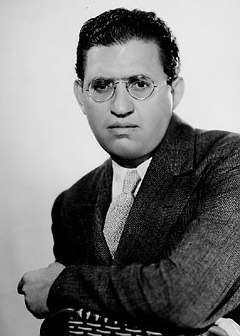
David O. Selznick; Best Picture winner

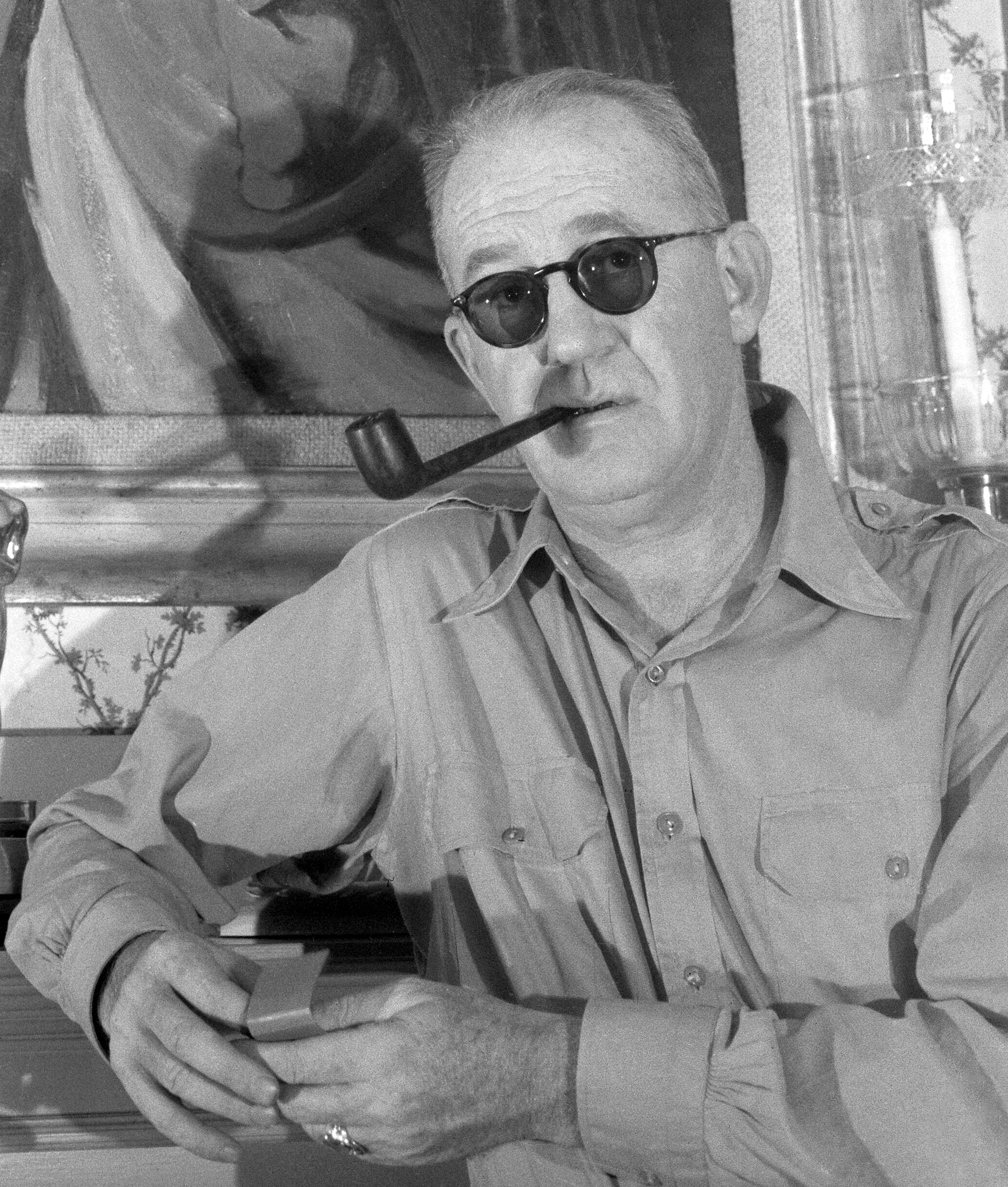
John Ford; Best Director winner

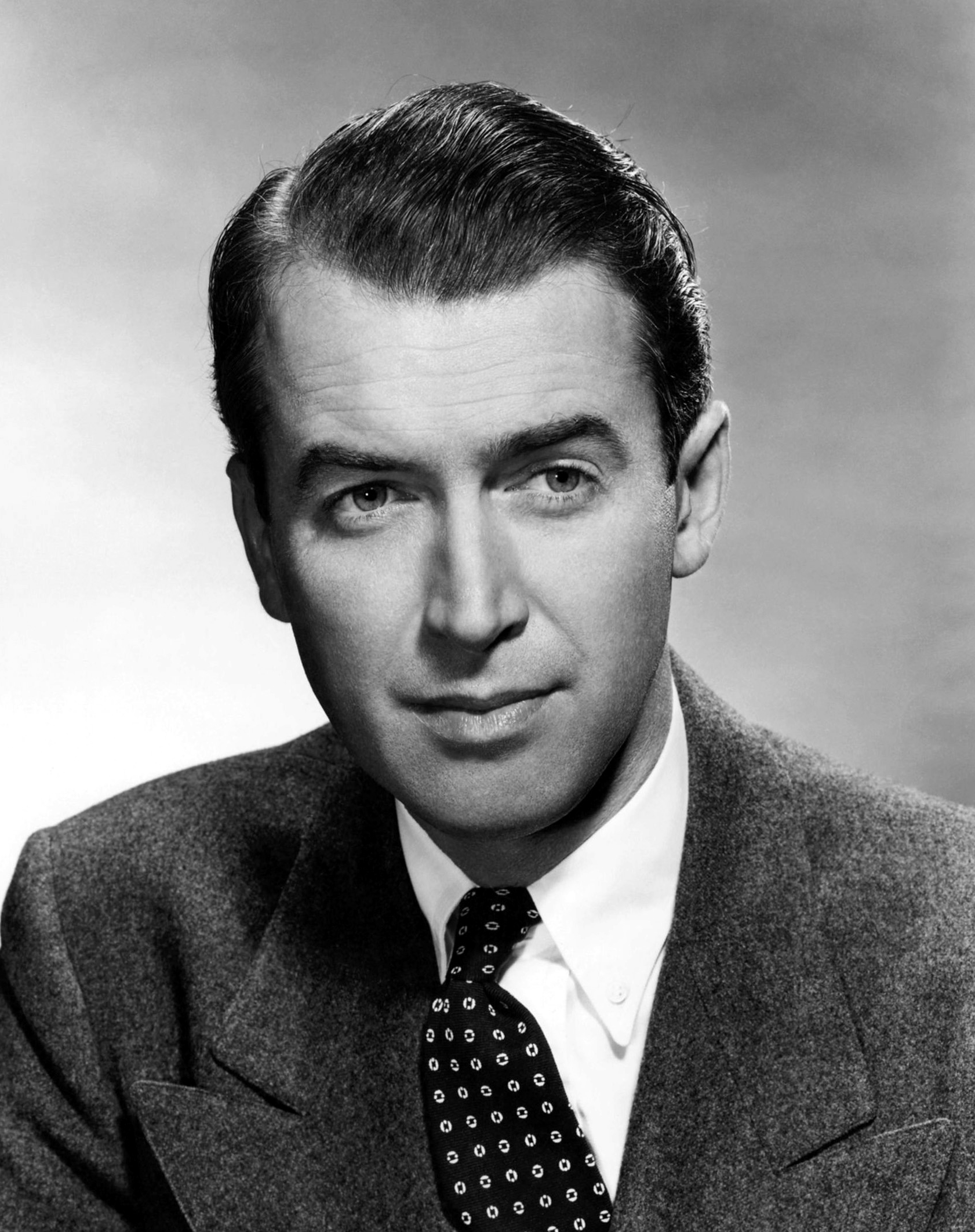
James Stewart; Best Actor winner

Ginger Rogers; Best Actress winner

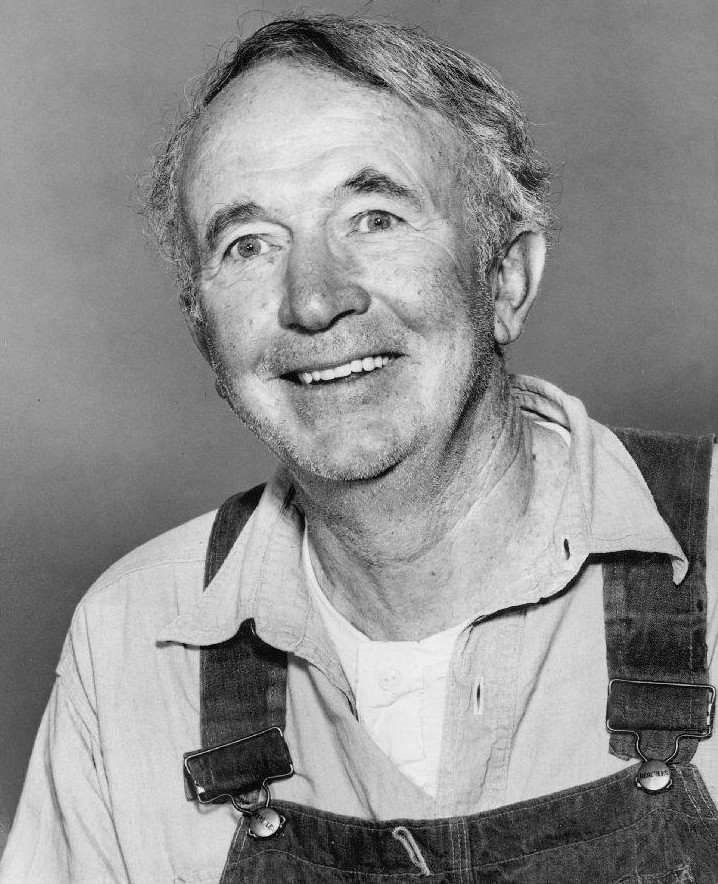
Walter Brennan; Best Supporting Actor winner

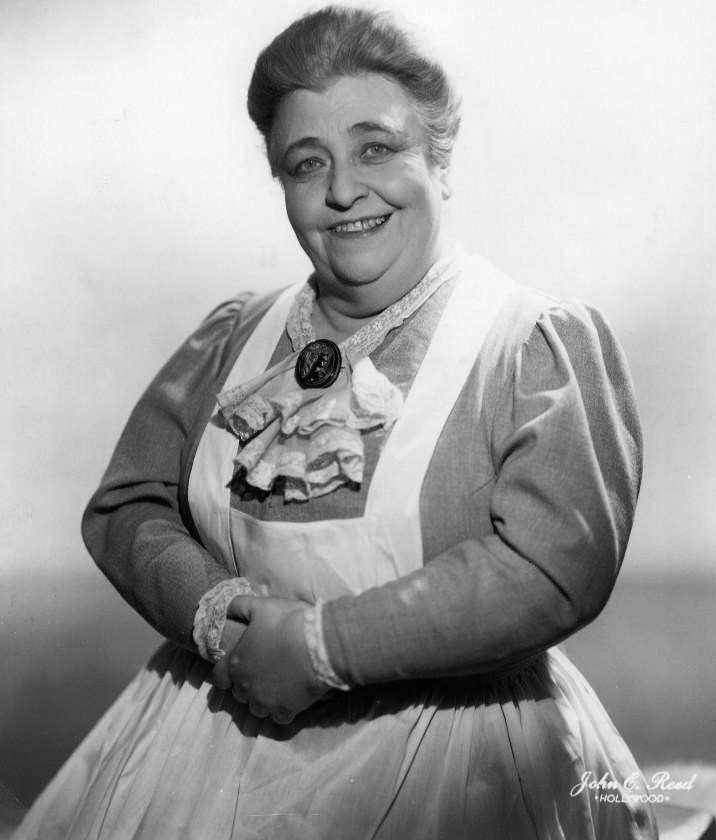
Jane Darwell; Best Supporting Actress winner

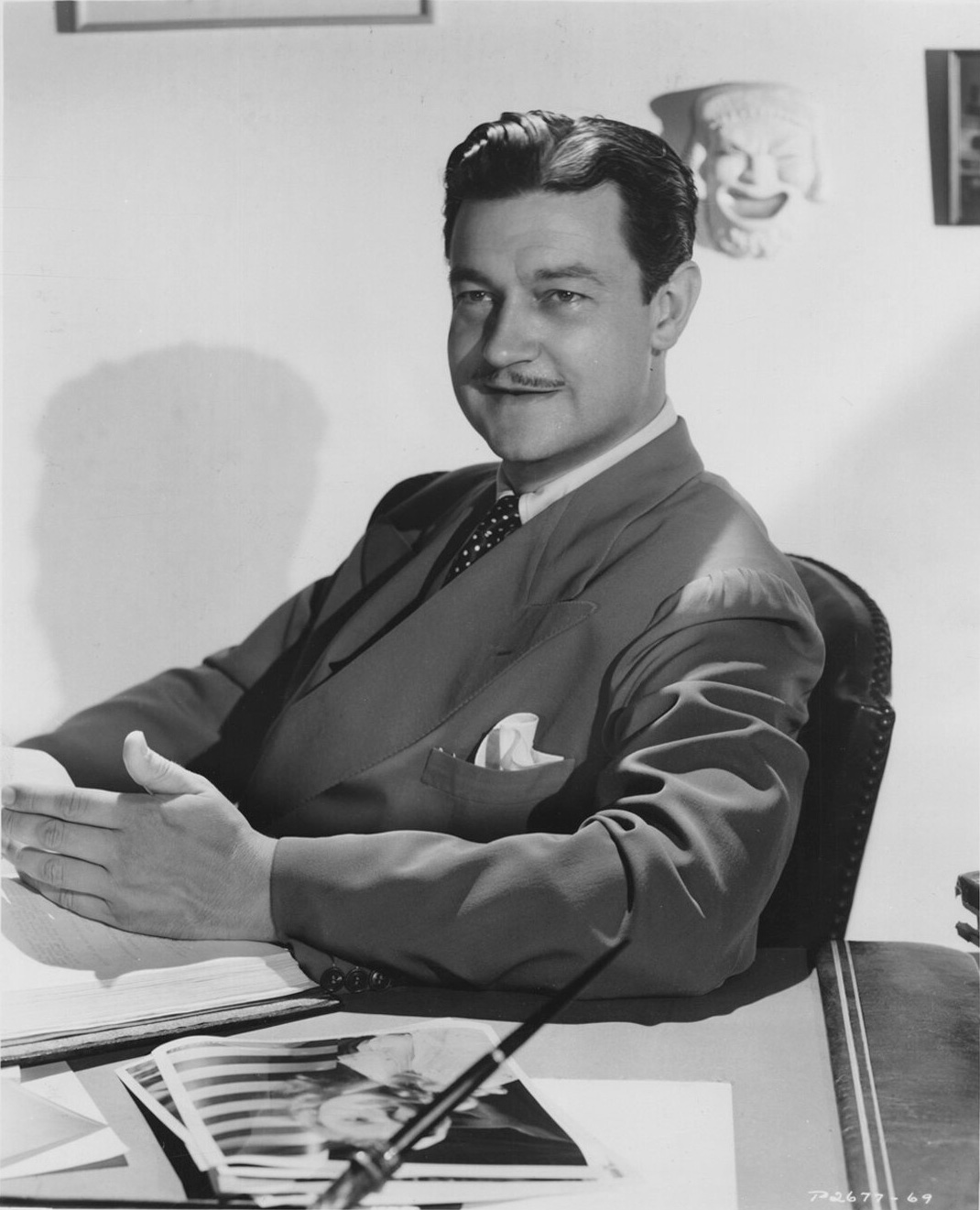
Preston Sturges; Best Original Screenplay winner

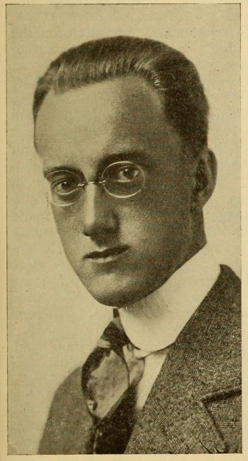
Pete Smith; Best Live Action Short Subject, One-Reel winner

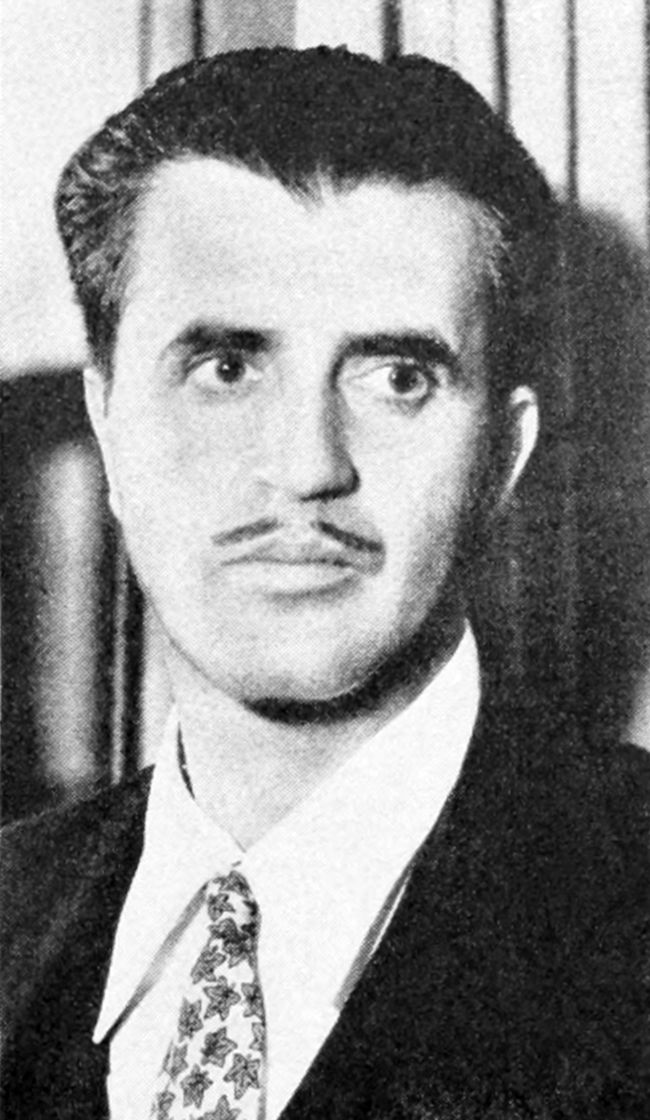
Cedric Gibbons; Best Art Direction, Black-and-White co-winner

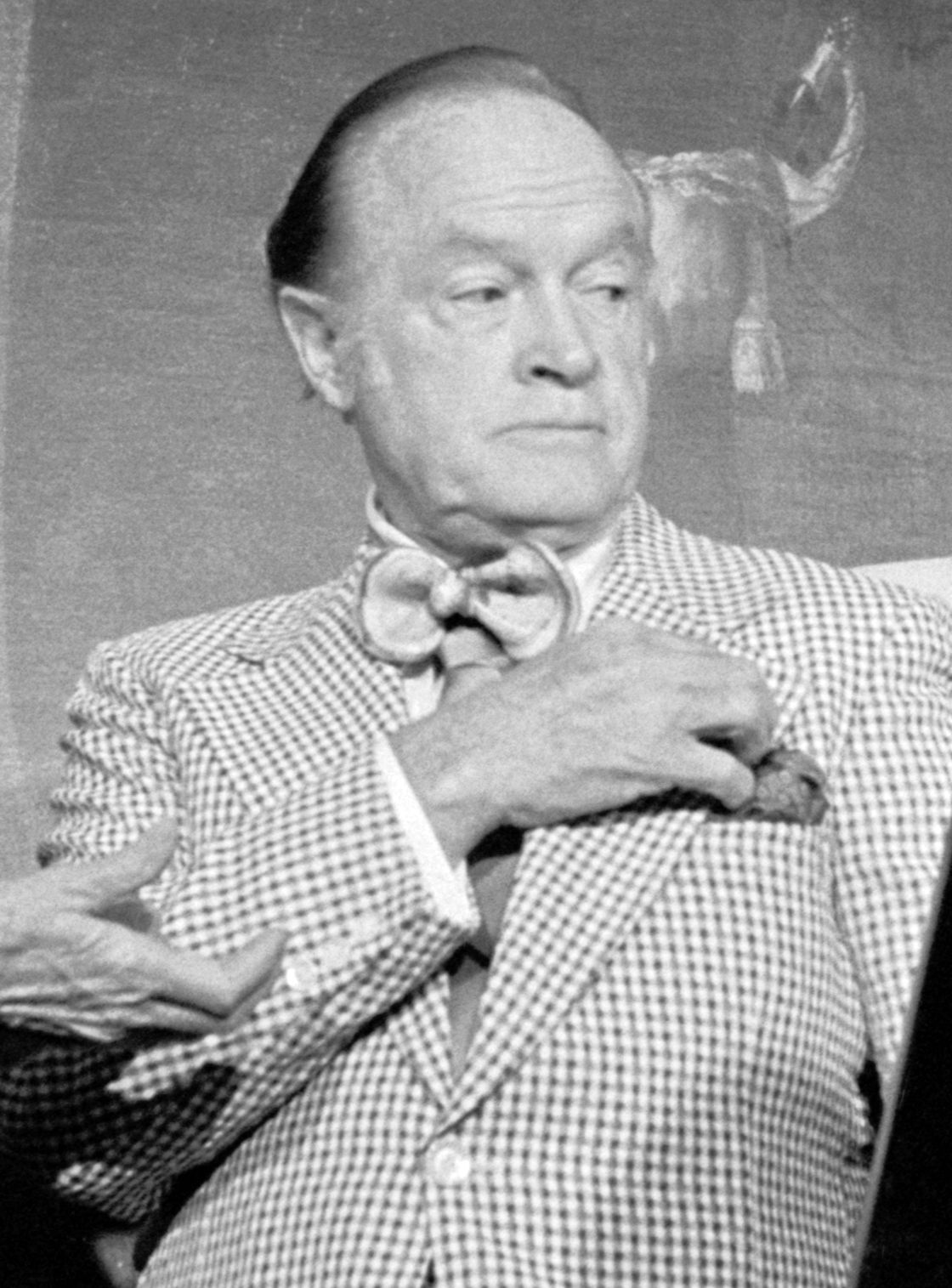
Bob Hope; Honorary Academy Award recipient

=== Awards ===
Nominees were announced on February 10, 1941. Winners are listed first and highlighted in boldface.

**Outstanding Production**: **Rebecca** **– David O. Selznick for Selznick International and United Artists**; All This, and Heaven Too – Jack L. Warner, Hal B. Wallis, and David Lewis for Warner Bros.; Foreign Correspondent – Walter Wanger for Walter Wanger Productions and United Artists; The Grapes of Wrath – Darryl F. Zanuck and Nunnally Johnson for 20th Century Fox; The Great Dictator – Charles Chaplin for Charlie Chaplin Productions and United Artists; Kitty Foyle – David Hempstead for RKO Radio; The Letter – Hal B. Wallis for Warner Bros.; The Long Voyage Home – John Ford for Argosy Films, Walter Wanger Productions, and United Artists; Our Town – Sol Lesser for Sol Lesser Productions and United Artists; The Philadelphia Story – Joseph L. Mankiewicz for Metro-Goldwyn-Mayer	**Best Directing**: **John Ford – The Grapes of Wrath**; Sam Wood – Kitty Foyle; William Wyler – The Letter; George Cukor – The Philadelphia Story; Alfred Hitchcock – Rebecca
**Best Actor**: **James Stewart – The Philadelphia Story as Macaulay "Mike" Connor**; Charles Chaplin – The Great Dictator as The Barber/Adenoid Hynkel; Henry Fonda – The Grapes of Wrath as Tom Joad; Raymond Massey – Abe Lincoln in Illinois as Abraham Lincoln; Laurence Olivier – Rebecca as Maximilian de Winter	**Best Actress**: **Ginger Rogers – Kitty Foyle as Kitty Foyle**; Bette Davis – The Letter as Leslie Crosbie; Joan Fontaine – Rebecca as the second Mrs de Winter; Katharine Hepburn – The Philadelphia Story as Tracy Samantha Lord; Martha Scott – Our Town as Emily Webb
**Best Actor in a Supporting Role**: **Walter Brennan – The Westerner as Judge Roy Bean**; Albert Bassermann – Foreign Correspondent as Van Meer; William Gargan – They Knew What They Wanted as Joe; Jack Oakie – The Great Dictator as Benzino Napaloni; James Stephenson – The Letter as Howard Joyce	**Best Actress in a Supporting Role**: **Jane Darwell – The Grapes of Wrath as Ma Joad**; Judith Anderson – Rebecca as Mrs. Danvers; Ruth Hussey – The Philadelphia Story as Elizabeth Imbrie; Barbara O'Neil – All This, and Heaven Too as Francoise "Fanny" Sebastiani de-Praslin; Marjorie Rambeau – Primrose Path as Mamie Adams
**Best Writing (Original Story)**: **Arise, My Love – Benjamin Glazer and John S. Toldy**; Comrade X – Walter Reisch; Edison, the Man – Hugo Butler and Dore Schary; My Favorite Wife – Leo McCarey, Samuel Spewack, and Bella Spewack; The Westerner – Stuart N. Lake	**Best Writing (Original Screenplay)**: **The Great McGinty – Preston Sturges**; Angels Over Broadway – Ben Hecht; Dr. Ehrlich's Magic Bullet – Norman Burnstine, Heinz Herald, and John Huston; Foreign Correspondent – Charles Bennett and Joan Harrison; The Great Dictator – Charles Chaplin
**Best Writing (Screenplay)**: **The Philadelphia Story – Donald Ogden Stewart, based on the play by Philip Barry**; The Grapes of Wrath – Nunnally Johnson, based on the novel by John Steinbeck; Kitty Foyle – Dalton Trumbo, based on the novel by Christopher Morley; The Long Voyage Home – Dudley Nichols, based on the plays The Moon of the Caribees, In the Zone, Bound East for Cardiff, and The Long Voyage Home by Eugene O'Neill; Rebecca – Robert E. Sherwood and Joan Harrison, based on the novel by Daphne du Maurier	**Best Short Subject (One-Reel)**: **Quicker'n a Wink – Pete Smith and Metro-Goldwyn-Mayer**; London Can Take It! – Warner Bros.; More About Nostradamus – Metro-Goldwyn-Mayer; Siege – RKO Radio
**Best Short Subject (Two-Reel)**: **Teddy, the Rough Rider – Warner Bros.**; Eyes of the Navy – Metro-Goldwyn-Mayer; Service with the Colors – Warner Bros.	**Best Short Subject (Cartoon)**: **The Milky Way – Rudolf Ising, Fred Quimby and Metro-Goldwyn-Mayer**; Puss Gets the Boot – Metro-Goldwyn-Mayer; A Wild Hare – Leon Schlesinger and Warner Bros.
**Best Music (Original Score)**: **Pinocchio – Leigh Harline, Paul Smith and Ned Washington**; Arizona – Victor Young; Dark Command – Victor Young; The Fight for Life – Louis Gruenberg; The Great Dictator – Meredith Willson; The House of the Seven Gables – Frank Skinner; The Howards of Virginia – Richard Hageman; The Letter – Max Steiner; The Long Voyage Home – Richard Hageman; The Mark of Zorro – Alfred Newman; My Favorite Wife – Roy Webb; North West Mounted Police – Victor Young; One Million B.C. – Werner R. Heymann; Our Town – Aaron Copland; Rebecca – Franz Waxman; The Thief of Bagdad – Miklós Rózsa; Waterloo Bridge – Herbert Stothart	**Best Music (Scoring)**: **Tin Pan Alley – Alfred Newman**; Arise, My Love – Victor Young; Hit Parade of 1941 – Cy Feuer; Irene – Anthony Collins; Our Town – Aaron Copland; The Sea Hawk – Erich Wolfgang Korngold; Second Chorus – Artie Shaw; Spring Parade – Charles Previn; Strike Up the Band – Georgie Stoll and Roger Edens
**Best Music (Song)**: **"When You Wish Upon a Star" from Pinocchio – Music by Leigh Harline; Lyrics by Ned Washington**; "Down Argentine Way" from Down Argentine Way – Music by Harry Warren; Lyrics by Mack Gordon; "I'd Know You Anywhere" from You'll Find Out – Music by Jimmy McHugh; Lyrics by Johnny Mercer; "It's a Blue World" from Music in My Heart – Music and Lyrics by Chet Forrest and Bob Wright; "Love of My Life" from Second Chorus – Music by Artie Shaw; Lyrics by Johnny Mercer; "Only Forever" from Rhythm on the River – Music by James V. Monaco; Lyrics by Johnny Burke; "Our Love Affair" from Strike Up the Band – Music and Lyrics by Roger Edens and Arthur Freed; "Waltzing in the Clouds" from Spring Parade – Music by Robert Stolz; Lyrics by Gus Kahn; "Who Am I?" from Hit Parade of 1941 – Music by Jule Styne; Lyrics by Walter Bullock	**Best Sound Recording**: **Strike Up the Band – Douglas Shearer**; Behind the News – Charles L. Lootens; Captain Caution – Elmer Raguse; The Grapes of Wrath – E. H. Hansen; The Howards of Virginia – Jack Whitney; Kitty Foyle – John O. Aalberg; North West Mounted Police – Loren L. Ryder; Our Town – Thomas T. Moulton; The Sea Hawk – Nathan Levinson; Spring Parade – Bernard B. Brown; Too Many Husbands – John P. Livadary
**Best Art Direction (Black-and-White)**: **Pride and Prejudice – Cedric Gibbons and Paul Groesse**; Arise, My Love – Hans Dreier and Robert Usher; Arizona – Lionel Banks and Robert Peterson; The Boys from Syracuse – John Otterson; Dark Command – John Victor Mackay; Foreign Correspondent – Alexander Golitzen; Lillian Russell – Richard Day and Joseph C. Wright; My Favorite Wife – Van Nest Polglase and Mark-Lee Kirk; My Son, My Son! – John DuCasse Schulze; Our Town – Lewis J. Rachmil; Rebecca – Lyle R. Wheeler; The Sea Hawk – Anton Grot; The Westerner – James Basevi	**Best Art Direction (Color)**: **The Thief of Bagdad – Vincent Korda**; Bitter Sweet – Cedric Gibbons and John S. Detlie; Down Argentine Way – Richard Day and Joseph C. Wright; North West Mounted Police – Hans Dreier and Roland Anderson
**Best Cinematography (Black-and-White)**: **Rebecca – George Barnes**; Abe Lincoln in Illinois – James Wong Howe; All This, and Heaven Too – Ernest Haller; Arise, My Love – Charles Lang; Boom Town – Harold Rosson; Foreign Correspondent – Rudolph Maté; The Letter – Tony Gaudio; The Long Voyage Home – Gregg Toland; Spring Parade – Joseph Valentine; Waterloo Bridge – Joseph Ruttenberg	**Best Cinematography (Color)**: **The Thief of Bagdad – Georges Périnal**; Bitter Sweet – Oliver T. Marsh and Allen Davey; The Blue Bird – Arthur C. Miller and Ray Rennahan; Down Argentine Way – Leon Shamroy and Ray Rennahan; North West Mounted Police – Victor Milner and W. Howard Greene; Northwest Passage – Sidney Wagner and William V. Skall
**Best Film Editing**: **North West Mounted Police – Anne Bauchens**; The Grapes of Wrath – Robert L. Simpson; The Letter – Warren Low; The Long Voyage Home – Sherman Todd; Rebecca – Hal C. Kern	**Best Special Effects**: **The Thief of Bagdad – Photographic Effects: Lawrence W. Butler; Sound Effects: Jack Whitney**; The Blue Bird – Photographic Effects: Fred Sersen; Sound Effects: Edmund H. Hansen; Boom Town – Photographic Effects: A. Arnold Gillespie; Sound Effects: Douglas Shearer; The Boys from Syracuse – Photographic Effects: John P. Fulton; Sound Effects: Bernard B. Brown and Joe Lapis; Dr. Cyclops – Photographic Effects: Farciot Edouart and Gordon Jennings; Foreign Correspondent – Photographic Effects: Paul Eagler; Sound Effects: Thomas T. Moulton; The Invisible Man Returns – Photographic Effects: John P. Fulton; Sound Effects: Bernard B. Brown and William Hedgcock; The Long Voyage Home – Photographic Effects: R. T. Layton and Ray Binger; Sound Effects: Thomas T. Moulton; One Million B.C. – Photographic Effects: Roy Seawright; Sound Effects: Elmer A. Raguse; Rebecca – Photographic Effects: Jack Cosgrove; Sound Effects: Arthur Johns; The Sea Hawk – Photographic Effects: Byron Haskin; Sound Effects: Nathan Levinson; Swiss Family Robinson – Photographic Effects: Vernon L. Walker; Sound Effects: John O. Aalberg; Typhoon – Photographic Effects: Farciot Edouart and Gordon Jennings; Sound Effects: Loren L. Ryder; Women in War – Photographic Effects: Howard J. Lydecker, William Bradford and Ellis J. Thackery; Sound Effects: Herbert Norsch

=== Special awards ===
- To Bob Hope, in recognition of his unselfish services to the Motion Picture Industry.
- To Colonel Nathan Levinson for his outstanding service to the industry and the Army during the past nine years, which has made possible the present efficient mobilization of the motion picture industry facilities for the production of Army Training Films.

== Ceremony information ==
For the first time, names of all winners remained secret until the moment they received their awards, a practice that has continued ever since. Franklin D. Roosevelt gave a six-minute direct radio address to the attendees from the White House. It is the first time an American president participated in the event.

== Multiple nominations and awards ==
Films with multiple nominations
Nominations	Film
11	Rebecca
7	The Grapes of Wrath
7	The Letter
6	Foreign Correspondent
6	The Long Voyage Home
6	Our Town
6	The Philadelphia Story
5	The Great Dictator
5	Kitty Foyle
5	North West Mounted Police
4	Arise, My Love
4	The Sea Hawk
4	Spring Parade
4	The Thief of Bagdad
3	All This, and Heaven Too
3	Down Argentine Way
3	My Favorite Wife
3	Strike Up the Band
3	The Westerner
2	Abe Lincoln in Illinois
2	Arizona
2	Bitter Sweet
2	The Blue Bird
2	Boom Town
2	The Boys from Syracuse
2	Dark Command
2	Hit Parade of 1941
2	The Howards of Virginia
2	One Million B.C.
2	Pinocchio
2	Second Chorus
2	Waterloo Bridge

Films with multiple awards
Awards	Film
3	The Thief of Bagdad
2	The Grapes of Wrath
2	The Philadelphia Story
2	Pinocchio
2	Rebecca

== See also ==
- 1940 in film
