= Empire (1962 TV series) =

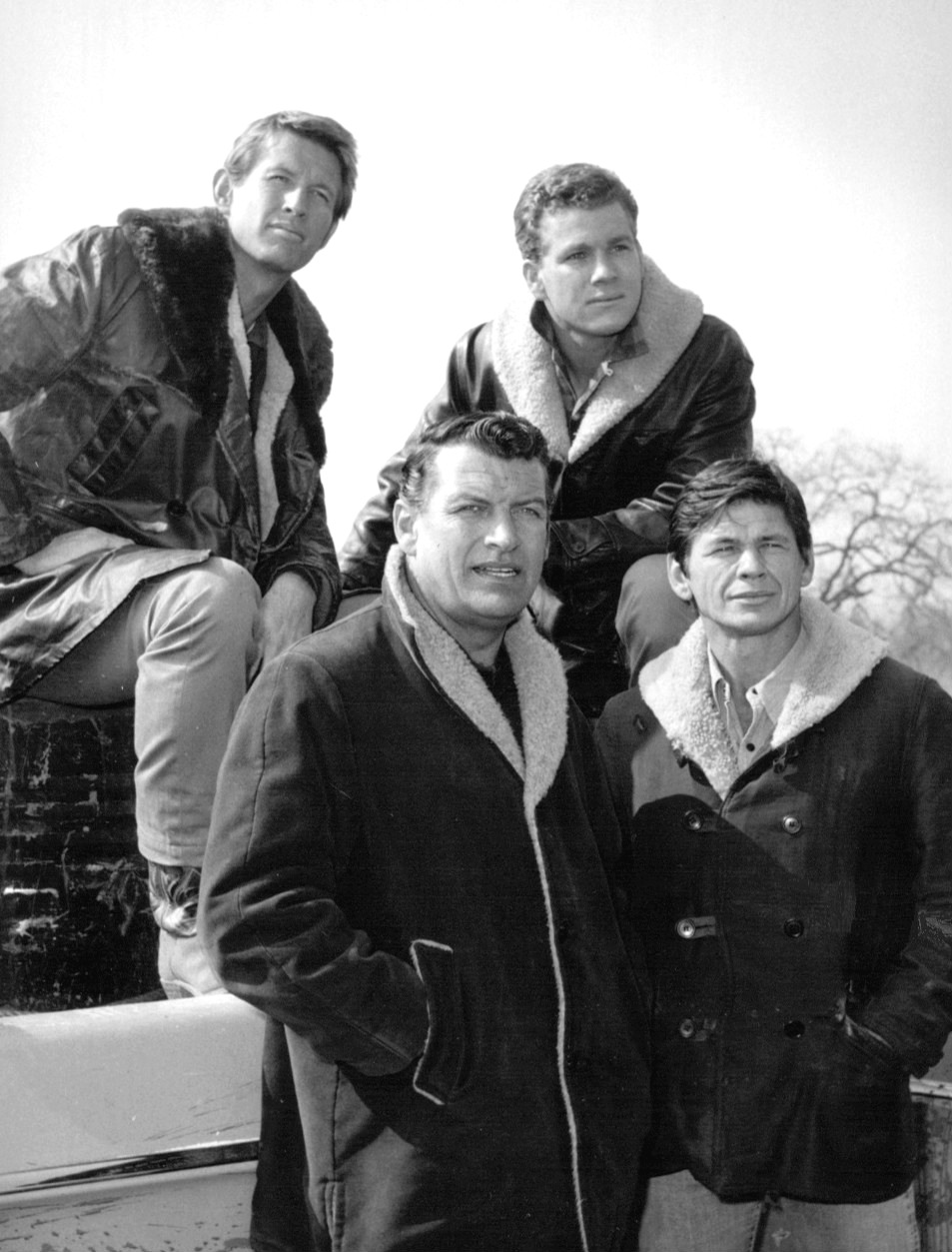
- Male cast members clockwise from back: Warren Vanders, Ryan O'Neal, Charles Bronson and Richard Egan, 1963
- Starring: Richard Egan; Ryan O'Neal; Terry Moore; Anne Seymour; Charles Bronson; Warren Vanders
- Composers: Johnny Green (pilot episode and two more episodes, plus series theme); Leith Stevens (two episodes); Hugo Friedhofer; Van Alexander; Richard Markowitz; William Loose
- Country of origin: United States
- No. of seasons: 1
- No. of episodes: 32

Production
- Running time: 60 minutes
- Production companies: Eaves Movie Ranch; Wilrich Productions; Screen Gems

Original release
- Network: NBC
- Release: September 25, 1962 – May 14, 1963

Related
- Redigo

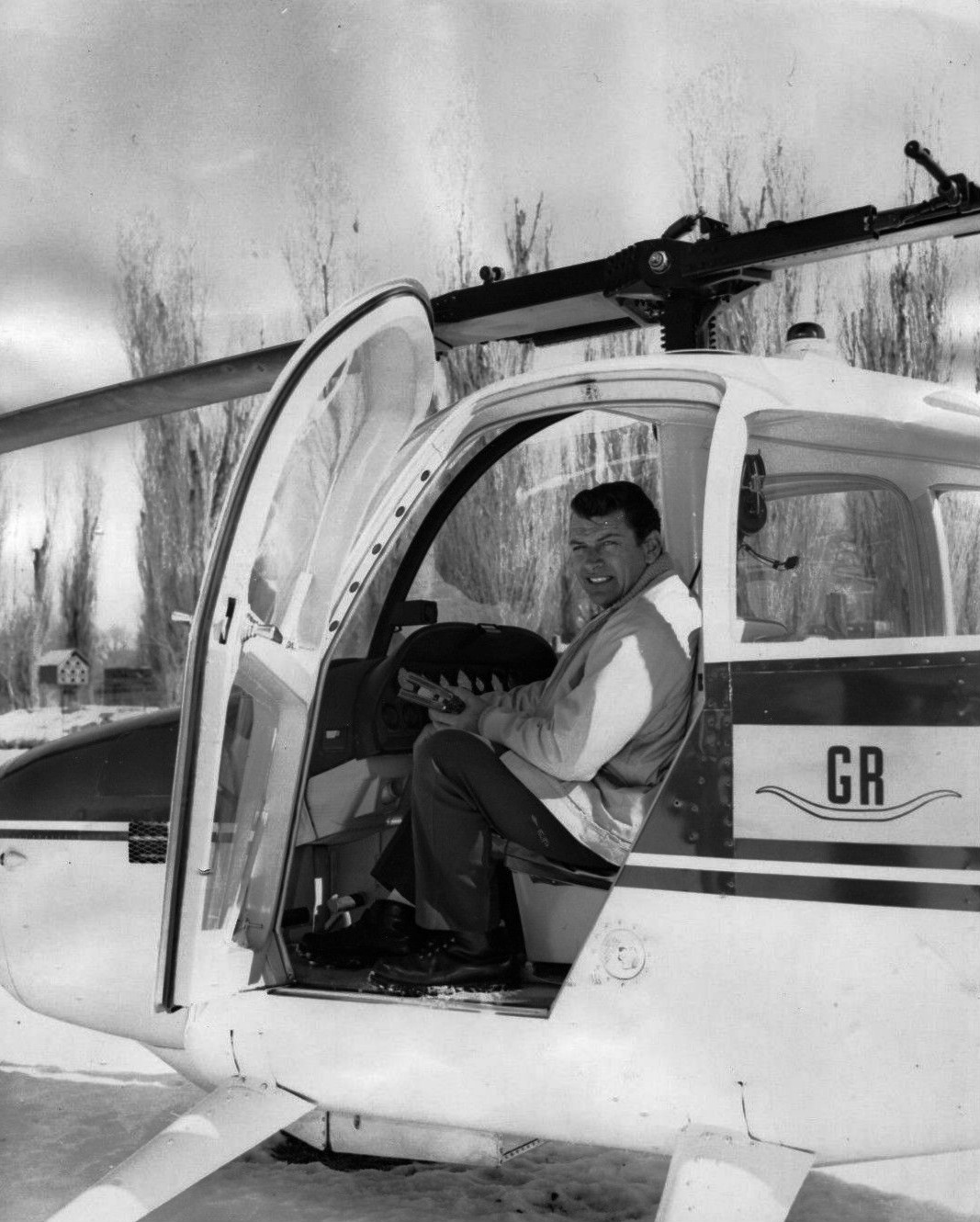
Richard Egan as Jim Redigo

Empire is an hour-long Western television series set on a 1960s 500,000-acre (2,000 km^{2}) ranch in New Mexico, starring Richard Egan, Terry Moore, Ryan O'Neal and Charles Bronson. It ran on NBC from September 25, 1962, to May 14, 1963.

After NBC cancelled the original series due to low ratings, a later version was made to rename it to Redigo (instead of having a 2nd season), truncated from one-hour episodes to half hour episodes, in black and white instead of color, and again starring Egan as Redigo. That version ran only for a partial season. However, even after NBC cancelled the original series in 1963 due to low ratings, ABC reran the show on Sundays, 7:30-8:30pm, on the partial part of the 1963-64 network television season, on Spring 1964.

In the UK the series was shown in the London ITV area (Associated-Rediffusion) under the title Big G, from Jun 12th 1963 to Jan 16th 1964.

In 1965 Columbia Pictures released the pilot episode as a film called This Rugged Land outside the US.

== Episodes ==
No. in season	Title	Directed by	Written by	Original release date
0	"This Rugged Land"	Arthur Hiller	Frank S. Nugent	N/A
Unaired pilot.
1	"The Day the Empire Stood Still"	Arthur Hiller	Frank S. Nugent	September 25, 1962
2	"Ballard Number One"	Walter Grauman	Gilbert Ralston	October 2, 1962
3	"A Place to Put a Life"	Fred Jackman Jr.	Unknown	October 9, 1962
4	"Ride to a Fall"	Abner Biberman	Ken Trevey	October 16, 1962
5	"Long Past, Long Remembered"	Ted Post	Unknown	October 23, 1962
6	"Walk Like a King"	Alex March	Alvin Sargent	October 30, 1962
7	"The Fire Dancer"	Fred Jackman Jr.	Stephen Kandel and Alvin Sargent	November 13, 1962
8	"The Tall Shadow"	John Farrow	Andy White	November 20, 1962
9	"The Earth Mover"	Harry Keller	Story by : Anthony Wilson; Teleplay by : Ken Trevey	November 27, 1962
10	"Pressure Lock" "Deadline"	Abner Biberman	Unknown	December 4, 1962
11	"Echo of a Man"	John Farrow	Antony Ellis	December 12, 1962
12	"When the Gods Laugh"	Robert Gist	Unknown	December 18, 1962
13	"Green, Green Hills"	Unknown	Unknown	December 25, 1962
14	"Stopover on the Way to the Moon"	William D. Russell	Robert E. Thompson	January 1, 1963
15	"The Four Thumbs Story"	Frank Pierson	Frank Pierson	January 8, 1963
16	"End of an Image"	Unknown	Unknown	January 15, 1963
17	"The Loner"	Unknown	Unknown	January 22, 1963
18	"Where the Hawk Is Wheeling"	John Farrow	Donald S. Sanford	January 29, 1963
19	"No Small Wars"	Unknown	Unknown	February 5, 1963
20	"The Tiger Inside" "The Hunted"	Bernard McEveety	Story by : Thomas Thompson; Teleplay by : Ric Hardman	February 12, 1963
21	"Season of Growth"	Bernard McEveety	Unknown	February 19, 1963
22	"Seven Days on Rough Street"	Bernard McEveety	Stephen Kandel	February 26, 1963
23	"A House in Order" "Farewell"	Byron Paul	Story by : Cyril Hume and Preston Wood; Teleplay by : Cyril Hume	March 5, 1963
24	"Down There, the World"	Leon Benson	Story by : John Falvo and Peter Mamakos; Teleplay by : John Falvo	March 12, 1963
25	"Burnout"	Bernard McEveety	Ken Kolb	March 19, 1963
26	"Hidden Asset"	Leonard J. Horn	Unknown	March 26, 1963
27	"Arrow in the Sky"	Frank Pierson	Unknown	April 9, 1963
28	"Nobody Dies on Saturday" "Breakout"	Hal Hudson	Unknown	April 16, 1963
29	"65 Miles Is a Long, Long Way"	Allen Reisner	Unknown	April 23, 1963
30	"Duet for Eight Wheels" "Ordeal"	Leon Benson	Ron Bishop	April 30, 1963
31	"Between Friday and Monday"	Unknown	Ken Trevey	May 7, 1963
32	"The Convention"	Abner Biberman	Billie D. McCord & B.W. Saxon	May 14, 1963

== Cast ==
=== Main cast ===
- Richard Egan as Jim Redigo (both versions 1 and 2)
- Ryan O'Neal as Tal Gerret (both versions 1 and 2)
- Terry Moore as Connie Gerret (version 1)
- Anne Seymour as Lucia Gerret (version 1)
- Charles Bronson as Moreno (version 2)
- Warren Vanders as Chuck (version 2)

=== Guest stars ===
Guest stars who appeared on Empire included:

- Inger Stevens
- Philip Abbott
- Barry Atwater
- Barbara Bain
- Roy Barcroft
- Joanna Barnes
- Ed Begley
- Diane Brewster
- Joyce Bulifant
- Walter Burke
- James T. Callahan
- Lon Chaney Jr.
- Pat Conway
- Ray Danton
- John Dehner
- Lawrence Dobkin
- Keir Dullea
- Sharon Farrell
- Joan Freeman
- Leo Gordon

- Frank Gorshin
- Harold Gould
- Dabbs Greer
- Virginia Gregg
- James Gregory
- James Griffith
- Joan Hackett
- Don C. Harvey
- Anne Helm
- Clegg Hoyt
- Arch Johnson
- L. Q. Jones
- Richard Jordan
- Victor Jory
- Gail Kobe
- Harvey Korman
- Bethel Leslie
- Joanne Linville
- Ralph Meeker

- Roger Mobley
- Bill Mumy
- Dan O'Herlihy
- Dennis Patrick
- Ford Rainey
- Gilman Rankin
- Chris Robinson
- Telly Savalas
- Karen Steele
- Robert J. Stevenson
- Harold J. Stone
- Frank Sutton
- Ray Teal
- Russell Thorson
- Tom Tully
- John Vivyan
- Eddy Waller
- William Windom

== Film/TV production crew ==
- Executive producer:
  - William Sackheim (E14)
  - Hal Hudson (E18, E26)
- Producer:
  - Frank Pierson (E14)
  - Andy White (E18, E26)
- Assistant to the Producer:
  - Ernest Nims (E14)
  - David Bretherton (E18, E26)
- Story executive:
  - Anthony Wilson (E14)
  - Sidney Biddell (E18)
  - Tom Crow (E26)
- Theme music: Johnny Green
- Created by: Kathleen Hite
- Director of photography: Charles S. Welborn
- Art director: Robert Peterson
- Film editor:
  - Harry Gerstad (also a part of the A.C.E.) (E14, E26)
  - Joseph Silver (E18)
  - David Bretherton (E30)
- Set decorator:
  - Sidney Clifford (E18, E26)
  - Louis Diage (E30)
- Make-up supervisor: Ben Lane (also a part of the S.M.A.)
- Music supervisor: Irving Friedman
- Music editor: Igo Kantor
- Sound effects editor: Jack Kirschner
- Technical advisor: Noel Smith (E30)
- Production supervisor: Seymour Friedman
- Post-production supervisor: Lawrence Werner
- Assistant director: John Bloss
