= Robert Layton =

Robert Layton may refer to:

- Robert Layton (politician) (1925–2002), Canadian politician`
- Robert Hugh Layton (born 1944), British anthropologist
- R. T. Layton (1884–1941), English special effects artist
- Robert Layton (musicologist) (1930–2020), English musicologist and music critic
