= Arizona Theatre Company =

American theater company

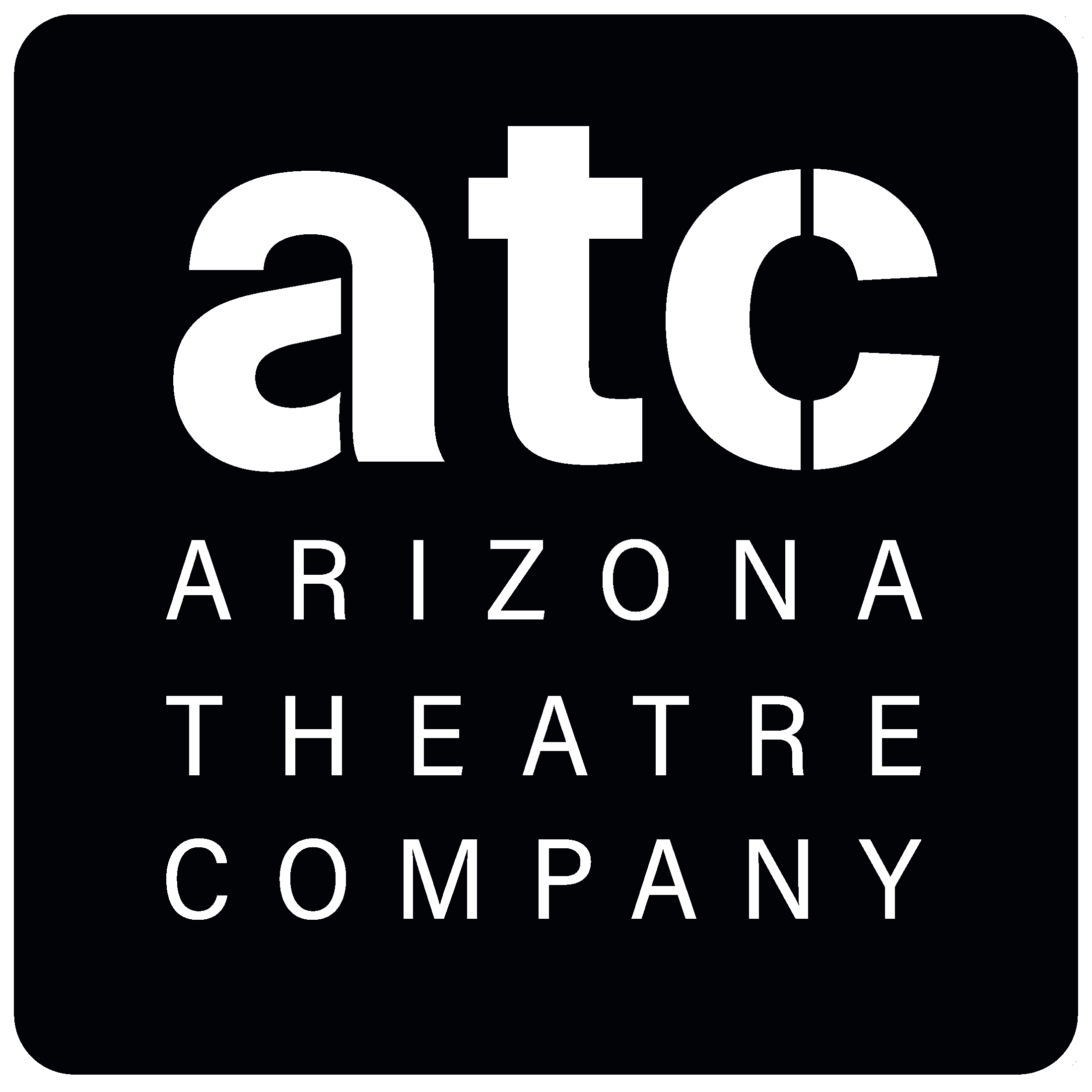
Arizona Theatre Company official logo

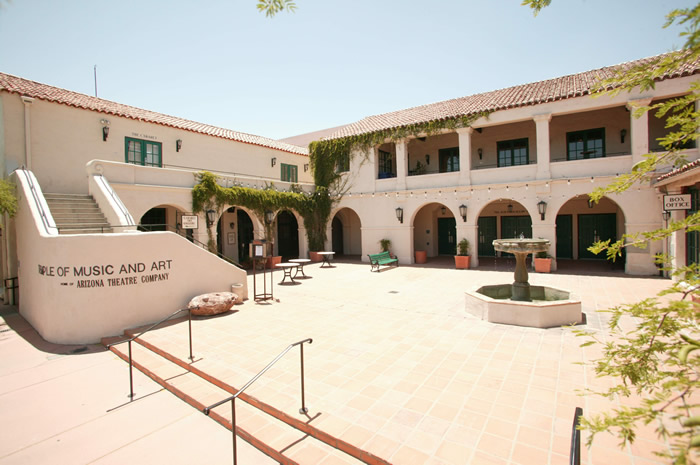
Temple of Music and Art, Arizona Theatre Company's home in Tucson, Arizona

The Arizona Theatre Company is an American nonprofit regional theater company operating in Phoenix, Arizona.

== History ==
The Arizona Theatre Company (ATC) was founded by Sandy Rosenthal in 1966 as the Arizona Civic Theatre. It originally performed in the basement of the old Santa Rita Hotel in Tucson. In 1972, the company achieved full professional status and became a member of the League of Resident Theatres (LORT).

The company began presenting a portion of its season in Phoenix in 1978, and a year later, its name was changed to Arizona Theatre Company.

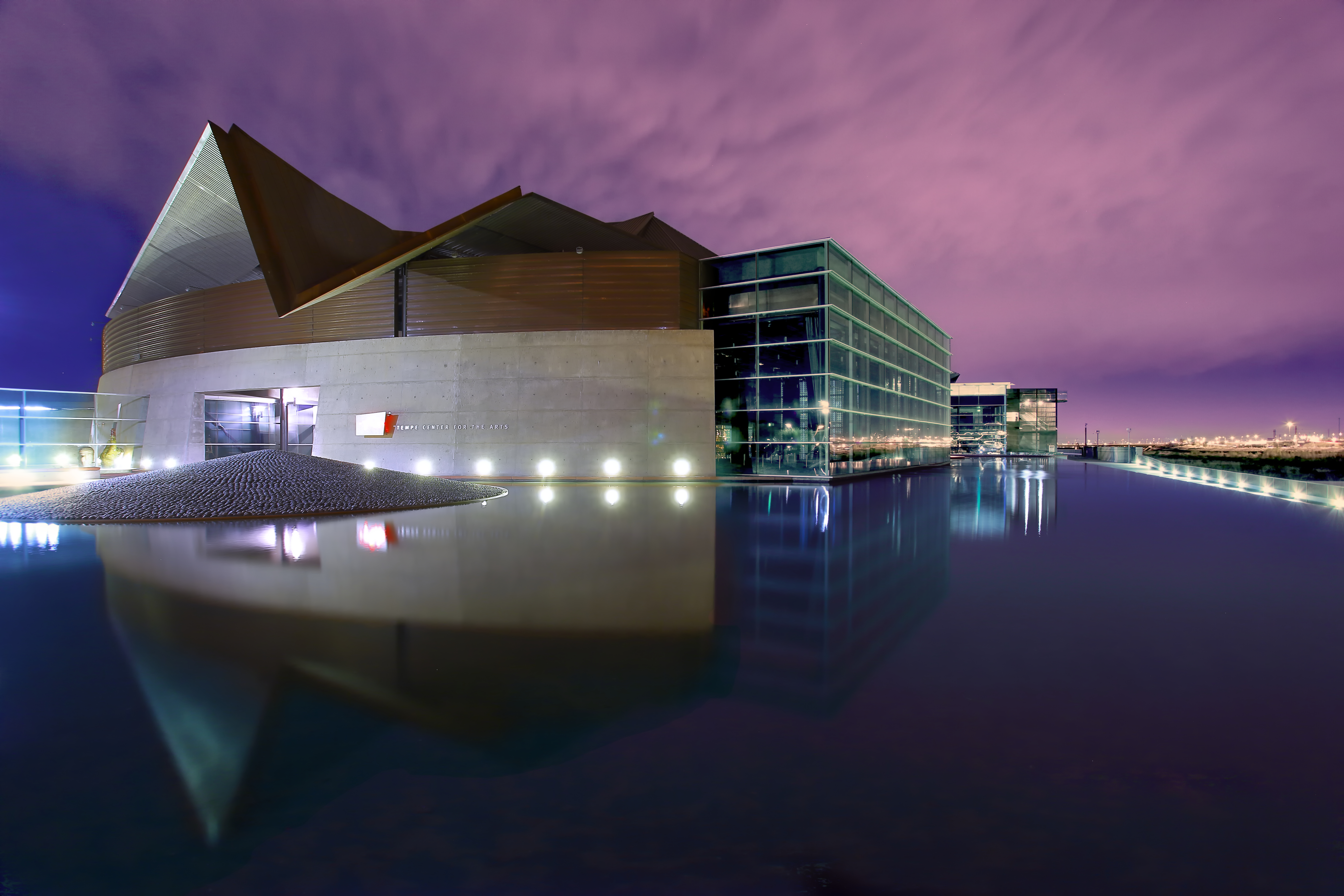
Tempe Center for the Arts, Arizona Theatre Company's home in the Phoenix Metropolitan Area

ATC has been performing full seasons in both Tucson and Phoenix since 1983.

In May 2019, Sean Daniels became the company's artistic director.
