= 1940 Academy Awards =

1940 Academy Awards may refer to:

- 12th Academy Awards, the Academy Awards ceremony that took place in 1940
- 13th Academy Awards, the 1941 ceremony honoring the best in film for 1940
