= 1941 Academy Awards =

1941 Academy Awards may refer to:

- 13th Academy Awards, the Academy Awards ceremony that took place in 1941
- 14th Academy Awards, the 1942 ceremony honoring the best in film for 1941
