= Our Town (1940 film) =

American drama romance film by Sam Wood (1940)

- Directed by: Sam Wood
- Screenplay by: Harry Chandlee; Frank Craven; Thornton Wilder
- Based on: Our Town (1938 play) by Thornton Wilder
- Produced by: Sol Lesser
- Starring: William Holden; Martha Scott; Fay Bainter
- Cinematography: Bert Glennon
- Edited by: Sherman Todd
- Music by: Aaron Copland
- Production company: Sol Lesser Productions
- Distributed by: United Artists
- Release date: May 24, 1940 (United States)
- Running time: 90 minutes
- Country: United States
- Language: English
- Budget: $1 million (approx)

Our Town is a 1940 American drama romance film adaptation of the 1938 play of the same name by Thornton Wilder, starring Martha Scott as Emily Webb, and William Holden as George Gibbs. The cast also included Fay Bainter, Beulah Bondi, Thomas Mitchell, Guy Kibbee, and Frank Craven. It was adapted by Harry Chandlee, Craven, and Wilder, and directed by Sam Wood.

The film was a faithful reproduction of the play except for two significant changes: the film used scenery, whereas the play had not; the events of the third act, which in the play revolve around the death of one of the main characters, were turned into a dream from which she awakens, allowing her to resume a normal life. Producer Sol Lesser worked with Wilder in creating these changes. Wilder wrote Lesser that "Emily should live.... In a movie you see the people so close to that a distant relation is established. In the theater they are halfway abstractions in an allegory; in the movie they are very concrete.... [I]t’s even disproportionately cruel that she die. Let her live...."

A radio adaptation of the film on Lux Radio Theater on May 6, 1940, used the altered film ending.

The U.S. copyright of the film was not renewed after its first term expired in 1968.

== Plot ==
The residents of the small town of Grover's Corners in New Hampshire live peacefully and in harmony. Dr. Gibbs, his wife Julie, and their two children George and Rebecca are the neighbors of the Webbs, who have a lovely daughter, Emily, and a younger son, Wally. George and Emily fall in love, and after three years of courting they get married. Time goes by and Emily becomes very sick after the birth of her second child. While she is dying, she meets all the people who have left this world in the years before. Emily, who remains in a kind of in-between world, remembers her previous life, but in the end, she decides to live, and she wakes up from her dream.

== Cast ==
- William Holden as George Gibbs
- Martha Scott as Emily Webb
- Fay Bainter as Mrs. Julia Gibbs
- Tim Davis as Joe Crowell Jr.
- Beulah Bondi as Mrs. Myrtle Webb
- Thomas Mitchell as Dr. Frank F. Gibbs
- Guy Kibbee as Mr. Charles Webb
- Dix Davis as Si Crowell
- Stuart Erwin as Howie Newsome
- Frank Craven as Stage Manager
- Doro Merande as Mrs. Louella Soames
- Philip Wood as Simon Stimson
- Ruth Tobey as Rebecca Gibbs (as Ruth Toby)
- Douglas Gardiner as Wally Webb
- Arthur B. Allen as Prof. Willard (as Arthur Allen)
- Charles Trowbridge as Rev. Dr. Ferguson
- Spencer Charters as Const. Bill Warren

== Score ==
Aaron Copland accepted the invitation to compose the musical score for the screen version of life in the small town of Grover's Corners, New Hampshire. He explained, "For the film version, they were counting on the music to translate the transcendental aspects of the story. I tried for clean and clear sounds and in general used straight-forward harmonies and rhythms that would project the serenity and sense of security of the story." Copland arranged about ten minutes from the film score for a suite. It is dedicated to Leonard Bernstein.

== Reception ==
In a 1940 review in the New York Times, Bosley Crowther wrote:

a more tonic and reassuring avowal of the nobility which resides in just plain folks—and the capacity for expression possessed by the screen—has not come this way in longer than we care to recall. ... it captures on film the simple beauties and truths of humble folks as very few pictures ever do: it is rich and ennobling in its plain philosophy—and it gives one a passionate desire to enjoy the fullness of life even in these good old days of today.

== Awards ==
Award	Category	Nominee(s)	Result
Academy Awards	Outstanding Production	Sol Lesser	Nominated
Academy Awards	Best Actress	Martha Scott	Nominated
Academy Awards	Best Original Score	Aaron Copland	Nominated
Academy Awards	Best Scoring	Aaron Copland	Nominated
Academy Awards	Best Sound Recording	Thomas T. Moulton	Nominated
Academy Awards	Best Art Direction, Black-and-White	Lewis J. Rachmil	Nominated
National Board of Review Awards	Top Ten Films		4th Place
