= Herbert Norsch =

American sound engineer (1908–1955)

- Born: August 15, 1908; St. Louis, Missouri, United States
- Died: July 28, 1955 (aged 46); Los Angeles, California, United States
- Occupation: Sound engineer
- Years active: 1935-1955

Herbert Norsch (August 15, 1908 – July 28, 1955) was an American sound engineer. He was nominated for an Oscar for Best Special Effects on the film Women in War at the 13th Academy Awards.
