= John Chambers (make-up artist) =

American make-up artist (1922–2001)

- Born: September 12, 1922; Chicago, Illinois, U.S.
- Died: August 25, 2001 (aged 78); Los Angeles, California, U.S.
- Occupations: Make-up artist, prosthetic makeup expert
- Spouse: Joan Chambers

John Chambers (September 12, 1922 – August 25, 2001) was an American make-up artist and prosthetic makeup expert in both television and film. He received an Academy Honorary Award from the Academy of Motion Picture Arts and Sciences in 1968. He is best known for creating the pointed ears of Spock in the television series Star Trek (1966), and for his groundbreaking prosthetic make-up work on the Planet of the Apes film franchise.

Chambers was awarded CIA's Intelligence Medal of Merit for his involvement in the Canadian Caper, in which six American hostages escaped during the 1979 Iran hostage crisis. The incident was the basis of the film Argo, which won the 2012 Academy Award for Best Picture, and in which Chambers was played by John Goodman.

== Early life and education ==
Chambers was born in Chicago, Illinois, to an Irish-American family. His father Michael emigrated from Newport in Ireland.

== Career ==
Chambers trained as a commercial artist and started his career designing jewellery and carpets. Following service as a U.S. Army dental technician during World War II, Chambers found employment repairing faces and making prosthetic limbs for wounded veterans at the Veterans Affairs hospital in Hines, Illinois. He also trained under Ben Nye, then head of make-up at 20th Century Fox.

In 1953, Chambers joined the NBC television network as a make-up artist for live shows. After working on his first film Around the World in Eighty Days in 1956, he then joined Universal Pictures. He attracted attention for his work on the film The List of Adrian Messenger, in which the audience had to guess which celebrities were concealed under Chambers' makeup; the actors' identities were not revealed until the end of the film. Chambers also worked on The Munsters and The Outer Limits TV series.

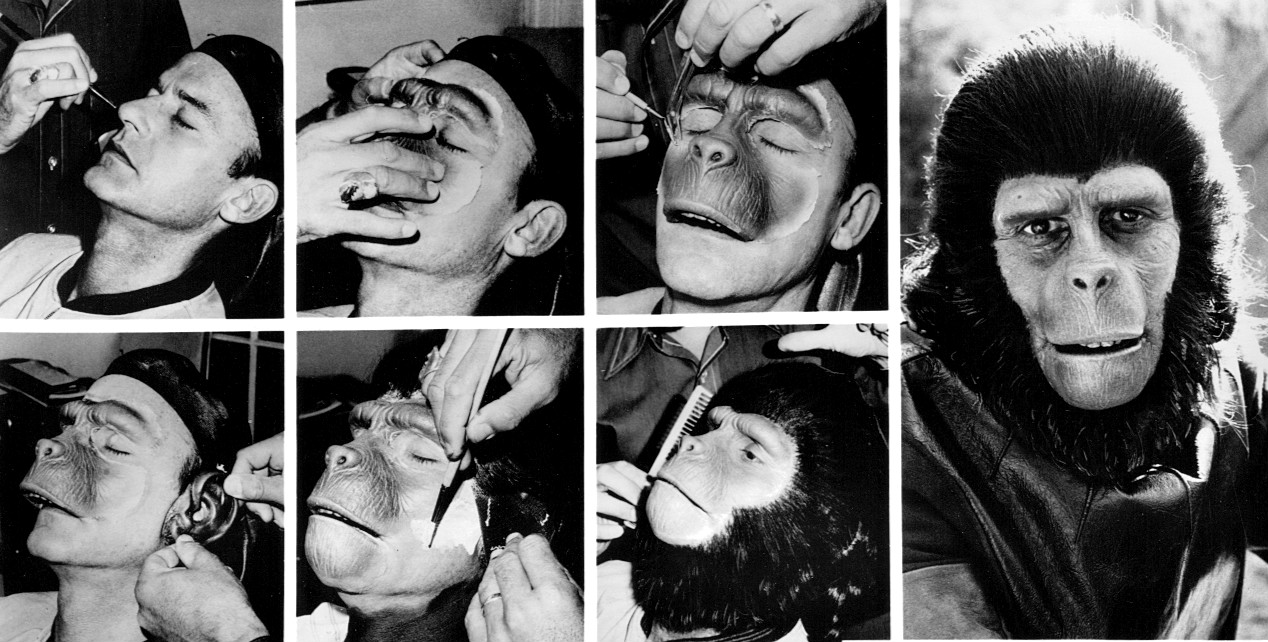
Prosthetic makeup design for Roddy McDowall in Planet of the Apes TV series (1974)

Chambers became known worldwide for his work on the Planet of the Apes film franchise, which began with the eponymous 1968 film. During its production, he held training sessions at the 20th Century Fox studios to mentor the other 78 artists working on the film. He won an honorary Oscar at the 41st Academy Awards in 1969 for his work on film, long before the Academy Award for Best Makeup was established in 1981. He was the first motion picture makeup artist to receive a star on the Hollywood Walk of Fame.

Chambers worked on the pilot episode of Mission Impossible and created the pointed ears worn by Leonard Nimoy's Spock in the original Star Trek television series. He also created Lee Marvin's prosthetic nose for his Academy Award-winning role in Cat Ballou (1965), and a prosthetic chest for Richard Harris in A Man Called Horse (1970), where he was hung on pins for a native American initiation ceremony. Some of his character creations, including Cornelius and Dr. Zaius from the Planet of the Apes series, are on display at The Science Fiction Museum in Seattle. Chambers served as president of the Society of Makeup Artists as well.

== Work with the CIA ==
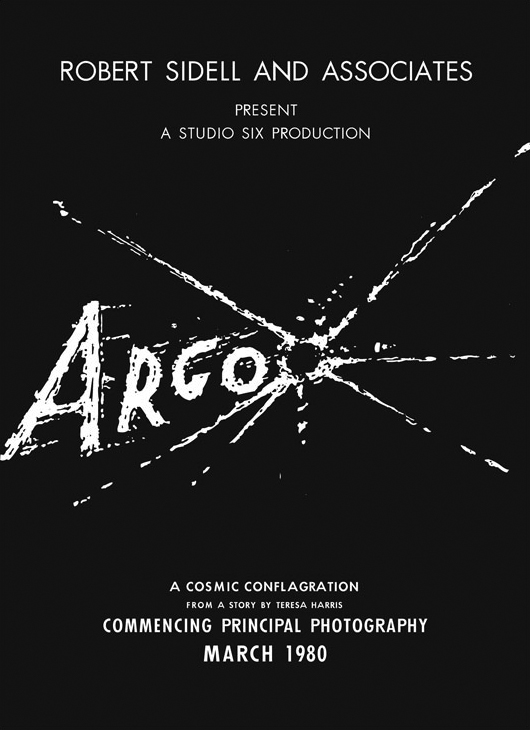
Movie poster of fake sci-fi film Argo, created as part of the cover story for Canadian Caper

In the late 1970s, Chambers worked as a contractor for the CIA, creating "disguise kits" for CIA personnel stationed in other countries. Some of his work can be seen at the International Spy Museum in Washington D.C.

In 1980, Chambers was enlisted by CIA officer Tony Mendez to work on the Canadian Caper—the rescue of six American embassy personnel who hid at the residence of the Canadian ambassador during the Iran hostage crisis. Chambers set up a fake movie and production company as a cover story of a film crew planning to shoot a science fiction film, titled Argo, in Iran. To make the cover story believable, Chambers used actor Michael Douglas's former office during the filming of The China Syndrome (1979) at Sunset Gower Studios. Chambers and Mendez printed fake business cards, held a film press party at a nightclub in Los Angeles, and took out advertisements in Variety and The Hollywood Reporter magazines. Fellow make-up artist Robert Sidell and his wife Andi assisted in the hoax; Andi posed as the receptionist of their fake production company.

The rescue effort was successful, and Chambers was awarded CIA's Intelligence Medal of Merit, but he was required to keep his involvement a secret, until the story was declassified in 1997. In the 2012 Academy Award for Best Picture-winning film Argo, Chambers was portrayed by John Goodman.

== Later life and death ==
Chambers retired in 1982 and lived in a retirement community, the Motion Picture Country Home, in Woodland Hills, California. In 1998, a documentary, A Tribute to John Chambers (1998), directed by Scott Essman, was released. That same year, he was named 94th in the list of "100 most influential people in the history of the movies". Chambers was also given a "star" on the Hollywood Walk of Fame at 7006 Hollywood Boulevard, one of few make-up artists to have one.

Chambers died on August 25, 2001, in a California hospital, at the age of 78. He was survived by his wife Joan.

== Complete filmography ==
- Around the World in 80 Days (1956) (uncredited)
- Ambush at Cimarron Pass (1958)
- Showdown at Boot Hill (1958)
- The List of Adrian Messenger (1963)
- The Human Duplicators (1965)
- Planet of the Apes (1968)
- Beneath the Planet of the Apes (1970)
- Beyond the Valley of the Dolls (1970) (uncredited)
- The Mephisto Waltz (1971) (uncredited)
- Escape from the Planet of the Apes (1971)
- Slaughterhouse-Five (1972)
- Conquest of the Planet of the Apes (1972)
- Superbeast (1972)
- Battle for the Planet of the Apes (1973)
- Sssssss (1973)
- Phantom of the Paradise (1974)
- Up from the Ape (1975 documentary)
- Twigs (1975 TV movie)
- Jaws (1975) (uncredited)
- Embryo (1976)
- Beauty and the Beast (1976 TV movie)
- The Island of Dr. Moreau (1977)
- Dark Echoes (1977)
- Halloween II (1981)
- Blade Runner (1982) (uncredited)
- National Lampoon's Class Reunion (1982) (uncredited)

== Partial television credits ==
- Shirley Temple Theatre (1960–1961)
- The Outer Limits (1963)
- The Munsters (1964)
- Star Trek (1966)
- Mission Impossible (1966)
- Lost in Space (1967–1968)
