= William Hedgcock =

American sound engineer

- Born: July 4, 1883; New York City, New York, United States
- Died: September 29, 1947 (aged 64); Hollywood, California, United States
- Occupation: Sound engineer
- Years active: 1929-1947

William Hedgcock (July 4, 1883 – September 29, 1947) was an American sound engineer. He was nominated for an Oscar for Best Special Effects on the film The Invisible Man Returns at the 13th Academy Awards. He worked on more than 90 films during his career.
