= The Long Voyage Home =

1940 film by John Ford

- Theatrical release poster
- Directed by: John Ford
- Screenplay by: Dudley Nichols
- Based on: The Moon of the Caribees; In the Zone; Bound East for Cardiff; The Long Voyage Home by Eugene O'Neill
- Produced by: John Ford; Walter Wanger (uncredited)
- Starring: John Wayne; Thomas Mitchell; Ian Hunter; Barry Fitzgerald; Wilfrid Lawson; John Qualen; Mildred Natwick
- Cinematography: Gregg Toland
- Edited by: Sherman Todd
- Music by: Richard Hageman
- Production companies: Walter Wanger Productions; Argosy Corporation
- Distributed by: United Artists
- Release date: October 8, 1940; (New York City)
- Running time: 105 minutes
- Country: United States
- Language: English
- Budget: $682,495
- Box office: $580,129

The Long Voyage Home is a 1940 American drama film directed by John Ford. It stars John Wayne, Thomas Mitchell and Ian Hunter. It features Barry Fitzgerald, Wilfrid Lawson, John Qualen, Mildred Natwick, and Ward Bond, among others. The film was adapted by Dudley Nichols from the plays The Moon of the Caribbees, In the Zone, Bound East for Cardiff, and The Long Voyage Home by Eugene O'Neill. The original plays by Eugene O'Neill were written around the time of World War I and were among his earlier plays. Ford set the story for the motion picture, however, during the early days of World War II.

While not one of Ford's best-known works, The Long Voyage Home continues to be well received. Film critics and scholars have noted Gregg Toland's distinctive cinematography, which serves as a precursor of the film noir aesthetic and hinted at his work for Orson Welles' film Citizen Kane (1941).

== Plot ==
A British tramp steamer named the SS Glencairn is on the long voyage home from the West Indies to Baltimore, and then to England during World War II. The crew is a motley, fun-loving, hard-drinking lot. Among them is their consensus leader, a middle-aged Irishman named Driscoll; a young Swedish ex-farmer, Ole Olsen; a spiteful steward nicknamed Cocky; a brooding Lord Jim-like Englishman, Smitty; and a burly, thoroughly dependable bruiser, Davis. On a sultry night in a port in the West Indies, the crew has been confined to the ship by order of the captain, but Drisk has arranged to import a boatload of local ladies. The crew carouse until a drunken brawl breaks out and the ladies are ordered off the ship and denied any of their promised compensation. The next day the ship sails to pick up its cargo for its return trip to England. When the crew discovers that the cargo is high explosives, they rebel, but are easily cowed into submission by the captain and the ship sails.

They are also concerned that Smitty might be a German spy because he is so aloof and secretive. After they assault Smitty and restrain and gag him, they force him to give up the key to a small metal box they have found in his bunk. Opening the box against Smitty's vigorous protests, they discover a packet of letters from Smitty's wife revealing the fact that Smitty has been an alcoholic, dishonorably discharged from the British navy. In the war zone as they near port, a German plane attacks the ship, killing Smitty in a burst of machine gun fire. Reaching England without further incident, the rest of the crew members decide not to sign on for another voyage on the Glencairn and go ashore, determined to help Ole return to his family in Sweden, whom he has not seen in ten years.

In spite of their determination to help Ole, the crew is incapable of passing up the opportunity for a good time drinking and dancing in a seedy bar to which they have been lured by an agent for ships looking for crew members. He has his eye on Ole because he is the biggest and strongest of the lot. He drugs Ole's drink, and his confederates shanghai him aboard another ship, the Amindra. Driscoll and the rest of the drunk crew rescue Ole, but Driscoll is clubbed and left on board as the crew makes its escape. The next morning, the crew straggles back to the Glencairn to sign on for another voyage. A newspaper headline reveals that the Amindra has been sunk in the Channel by German torpedoes, killing all on board.

== Cast ==
- John Wayne as Olsen
- Thomas Mitchell as Driscoll
- Ian Hunter as Smitty
- Barry Fitzgerald as Cocky Stuart
- Wilfrid Lawson as Captain
- John Qualen as Axel Swanson
- Mildred Natwick as Freda
- Ward Bond as Yank
- Arthur Shields as Donkeyman
- Joseph Sawyer as Davis
- J.M. Kerrigan as Crimp
- Rafaela Ottiano as Bella
- Carmen Morales as Principal Spanish Girl
- Jack Pennick as Johnny
- Bob E. Perry as Paddy
- Constant Frenke as Norway
- David Hughes as Scotty
- Constantine Romanoff as Big Frank
- Dan Borzage as Tim
- Harry Tenbrook as Max
- Cyril McLaglen as First Mate
- Douglas Walton as Second Mate
- Billy Bevan as Joe, the Limehouse Barman (uncredited)

== Production ==
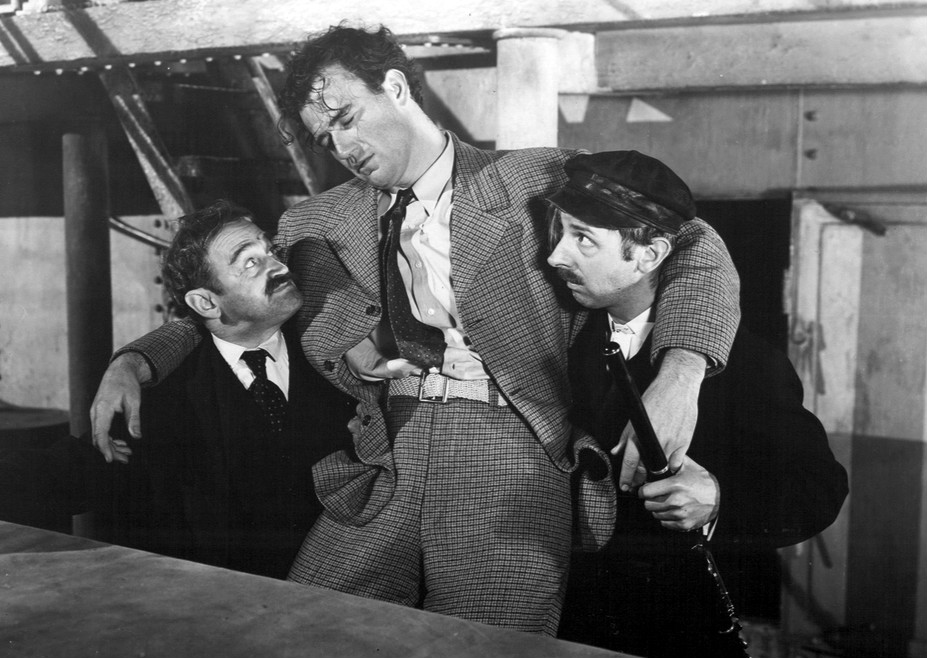
Barry Fitzgerald, John Wayne and John Qualen in The Long Voyage Home

Independent film producer Walter Wanger made film-making history during the production of this film. He hired nine prominent American artists, all painters, to document the dramatic scenes during the film's production. Mr. Wanger offered a commission of over $50,000 to encourage the artists to participate, these funds were secured with the help of Reeves Lowenthal, the director of the Associated American Artists. No other undertaking of this magnitude and purpose had been done before in Hollywood film making. The artists insisted on three things to ensure a quality effort: freedom of choice on subject matter, studios on the production lot, and a projection room for viewing rushes. The artists who participated were Thomas Hart Benton, Grant Wood, George Biddle, James Chapin, Ernest Fiene, Robert Philipp, Luis Quintanilla, Raphael Soyer and Georges Schreiber. Eleven original paintings emerged from this inaugural effort. These toured the country in the museum circuit of the day beginning with a display in the Associated American Artists Galleries on Fifth Avenue in New York City.

As Orson Welles did the following year in Citizen Kane, director John Ford shared his title card with cinematographer Gregg Toland in the opening credits for The Long Voyage Home.

== Release ==
The film did poorly in its theatrical release, losing $224,336. Some critics suggested that the film failed to appeal to the general public because it was too dark and lacked a romance.

It was released on DVD in 2006 by Warner Bros. Home Video but is now out-of-print. The Criterion Collection has the home video rights to release it. It has not yet been released on DVD or Blu-ray by The Criterion Collection, but is available for streaming on Criterion Channel as of June 2020.

It is available as part of a John Ford box set, Region 2.

== Reception ==
Film critic Bosley Crowther of The New York Times liked the screenplay, the message of the film, and John Ford's direction, writing:

John Ford has truly fashioned a modern Odyssey—a stark and tough-fibered motion picture which tells with lean economy the never-ending story of man's wanderings over the waters of the world in search of peace for his soul...it is harsh and relentless and only briefly compassionate in its revelation of man's pathetic shortcomings. But it is one of the most honest pictures ever placed upon the screen; it gives a penetrating glimpse into the hearts of little men and, because it shows that out of human weakness there proceeds some nobility, it is far more gratifying than the fanciest hero-worshiping fare.

The staff at Variety magazine wrote:

Combining dramatic content of four Eugene O'Neill one-act plays, John Ford pilots adventures of a tramp steamer from the West Indies to an American port, and then across the Atlantic with [a] cargo of high explosives. Picture is typically Fordian, his direction accentuating characterizations and adventures of the voyage.

Harrison's Reports called it "A powerful picture, directed with skill and acted with artistry." Film Daily called it "a powerful, realistic vehicle, human and dramatic from main title to finish." John Mosher of The New Yorker wrote a rave review: "[One] of the magnificent films of film history. Never has the sea, its infinite pictorial possibilities, been so comprehended upon the screen and its beauty and its threat so eloquently conveyed."

O'Neill told Ford the film was a "grand, deeply moving and beautiful piece of work...a great picture."

Rotten Tomatoes reports 100% approval from critics, based on nine reviews.

The title track of folk musician Phil Ochs's album Pleasures of the Harbor was directly inspired by a viewing of the film.

=== Awards and nominations ===
Award	Category	Nominee(s)	Result
Academy Awards	Outstanding Production	John Ford	Nominated
Academy Awards	Best Screenplay	Dudley Nichols	Nominated
Academy Awards	Best Cinematography – Black-and-White	Gregg Toland	Nominated
Academy Awards	Best Film Editing	Sherman Todd	Nominated
Academy Awards	Best Original Score	Richard Hageman	Nominated
Academy Awards	Best Special Effects	R. T. Layton, Ray Binger and Thomas T. Moulton	Nominated
National Board of Review Awards	Top Ten Films		6th Place
National Board of Review Awards	Best Acting	Thomas Mitchell	Won
New York Film Critics Circle Awards	Best Actor	Thomas Mitchell	Nominated
New York Film Critics Circle Awards	Best Director	John Ford (also for The Grapes of Wrath)	Won
