= National Board of Review Awards 1940 =

Annual US film awards ceremony

12th National Board of Review Awards

December 22, 1940

The 12th National Board of Review Awards were announced on 22 December 1940.

== Best American Films ==
1. The Grapes of Wrath
2. The Great Dictator
3. Of Mice and Men
4. Our Town
5. Fantasia
6. The Long Voyage Home
7. Foreign Correspondent
8. The Biscuit Eater
9. Gone with the Wind
10. Rebecca

== Winners ==
- Best American Film: The Grapes of Wrath
- Best Foreign Film: La femme du boulanger (The Baker's Wife), France
- Best Documentary: The Fight for Life
- Best Acting:
  - Jane Bryan - We Are Not Alone
  - Charles Chaplin - The Great Dictator
  - Jane Darwell - The Grapes of Wrath
  - Betty Field - Of Mice and Men
  - Henry Fonda - The Grapes of Wrath and The Return of Frank James
  - Joan Fontaine - Rebecca
  - Greer Garson - Pride and Prejudice
  - William Holden - Our Town
  - Vivien Leigh - Gone with the Wind and Waterloo Bridge
  - Thomas Mitchell - The Long Voyage Home
  - Raimu - The Baker's Wife
  - Ralph Richardson - On the Night of the Fire
  - Flora Robson - We Are Not Alone
  - Ginger Rogers - Primrose Path
  - George Sanders - Rebecca
  - Martha Scott - Our Town
  - James Stewart - The Shop Around the Corner
  - Conrad Veidt - Escape
