= Joe Lapis =

Hungarian sound engineer

- Born: Joseph Paul Lapis; 10 April 1899; Borsod-Abaúj-Zemplén County, Kingdom of Hungary
- Died: 26 October 1991 (aged 92); San Luis Obispo County, California, United States
- Occupation: Sound engineer
- Years active: 1929-1964

Joe Lapis (10 April 1899 – 26 October 1991) was a Hungarian sound engineer. He was nominated for an Oscar for Best Special Effects on the film The Boys from Syracuse at the 13th Academy Awards. He worked on more than 170 films during his career.
