= Arizona (1940 film) =

1940 film by Wesley Ruggles

- Theatrical release poster.
- Directed by: Wesley Ruggles
- Written by: Claude Binyon
- Based on: Arizona; 1939 novel by Clarence Budington Kelland
- Produced by: Wesley Ruggles
- Starring: Jean Arthur; William Holden; Warren William
- Cinematography: Joseph Walker; Fayte M. Browne; Harry Hallenberger
- Edited by: William A. Lyon; Otto Meyer
- Music by: Victor Young
- Production company: Columbia Pictures
- Distributed by: Columbia Pictures
- Release date: December 25, 1940
- Running time: 122 minutes
- Country: United States
- Language: English

Arizona is a 1940 American Western film directed by Wesley Ruggles, and starring Jean Arthur, William Holden and Warren William.

Victor Young was nominated for the Academy Award for Best Original Score, while Lionel Banks and Robert Peterson were considered for the Academy Award for Best Art Direction, Black-and-White.

== Plot ==
Life in the Arizona Territory in early 1861 is hard, but Phoebe Titus, the only American woman in the pioneering community of Tucson, is up to the challenge. She catches the eye of Peter Muncie, a handsome young man with a wagon train passing through on the way to California. He begins courting her but tells her that he is not ready to settle down in one spot. Phoebe offers him a job heading a new freight company that she has just formed with store owner Solomon Warner, but Peter is determined to see California and promises to return when his wanderlust is satisfied.

A dandy named Jefferson Carteret appears just as the Civil War breaks out. He helps Phoebe persuade wavering residents to remain after the Union garrison pulls out, leaving them without protection against the Indians. Carteret pretends to be Phoebe's friend, but coerces her competitor Lazarus Ward into making him a secret partner.

Carteret and Ward try to destroy Phoebe's business and bribe Indian chief Mano with guns to attack her wagons. The Confederates gain the temporary allegiance of the community by sending troops, but they are soon recalled east. Union troops of the California Column, including Peter as a sergeant, return in April 1862 just as Tucson's situation becomes desperate. Peter helps Phoebe secure a lucrative army freight contract, but Carteret has Ward slander her to the Union commander, claiming that she supplied ammunition for the departed Confederates. Peter and Phoebe extract the truth from Ward at gunpoint and regain the contract. Soon after, Peter's enlistment expires.

Phoebe persuades Peter to travel to Nebraska to buy cattle for the ranch that she has always dreamed of owning. She has already purchased a great deal of land cheaply from those who moved away because of the Indian troubles. However, the $15,000 paid her by the army is stolen by Carteret's men disguised as Mexican bandits. Carteret offers to make her a loan, with her business and land as security, and she accepts. Six months later, Carteret tells Phoebe that her loan will come due the next day.

However, Peter is half a day away with their herd. Carteret coaxes the Indians to attack, but Peter and his men are able to fight them off. Peter extracts a confession from one of Carteret's men, but Carteret kills the henchman after he shoots Ward. The town celebrates as Phoebe and Peter get married. When Peter goes to settle accounts with Carteret, shots are heard, and Phoebe takes her slightly wounded new husband home.

== Cast ==
- Jean Arthur as Phoebe Titus
- William Holden as Peter Muncie
- Warren William as Jefferson Carteret
- Porter Hall as Lazarus Ward
- Edgar Buchanan as Judge Bogardus
- Paul Harvey as Solomon Warner
- George Chandler as Haley
- Byron Foulger as Pete Kitchen
- Regis Toomey as Grant Oury
- Paul Lopez as Estevan Ochoa
- Colin Tapley as Bart Massey
- Uvaldo Varela as Hilario Callego
- Earl Crawford as Joe Briggs
- Griff Barnett as Sam Hughes
- Ludwig Hardt as Meyer

== Production ==
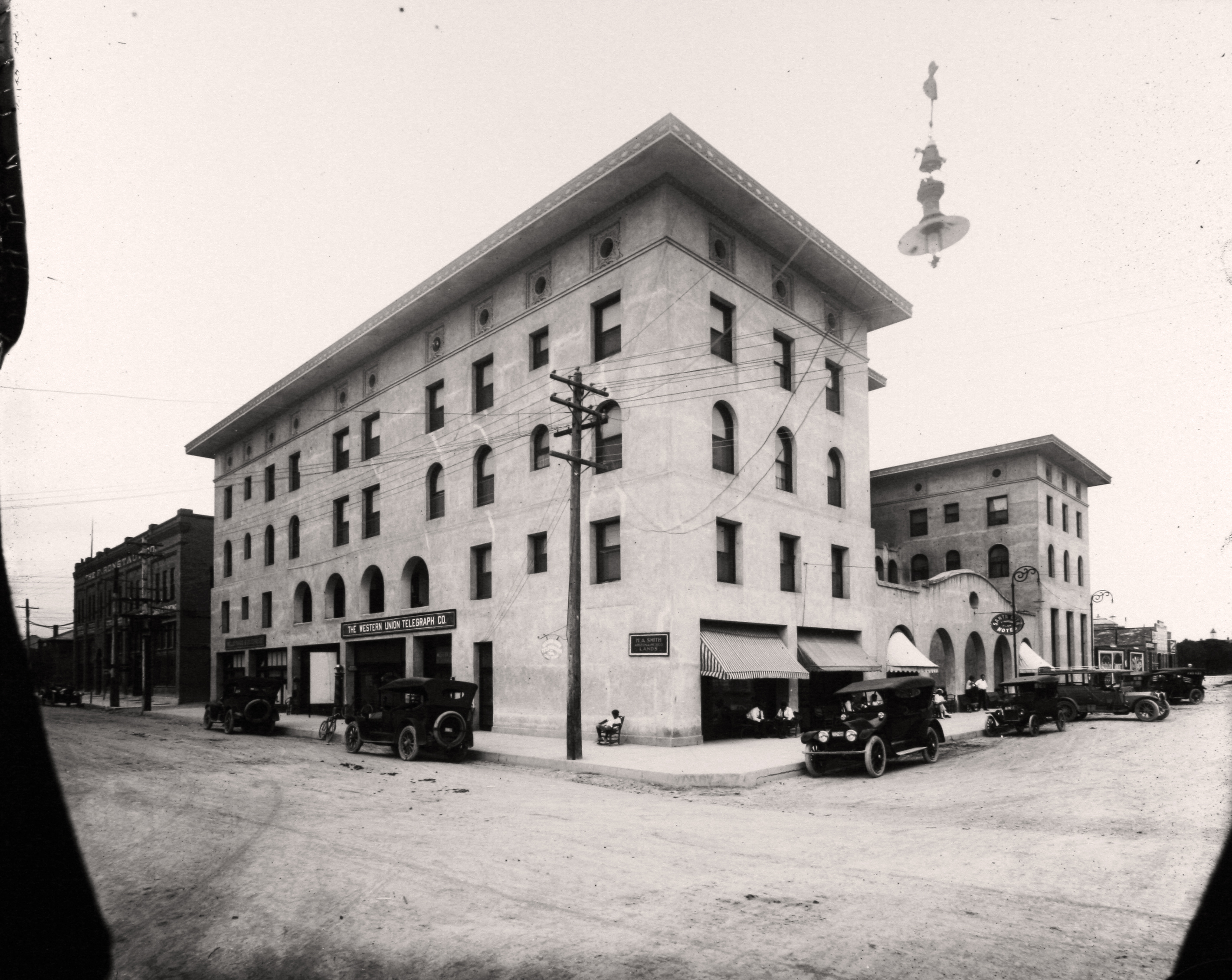
Santa Rita Hotel in Tucson, where the cast and crew stayed during production

Ruggles read the Clarence Budington Kelland novel Arizona in 1939 and felt that the story had potential for a film. He proposed to Columbia Studios that he would direct the film in Tucson, Arizona. Scouting on location, he found a filming spot about 10 miles (16 km) west of downtown Tucson in the Sonoran Desert, against the backdrop of the Tucson Mountains. Filming was postponed until the spring of 1940 because of concerns about World War II in Europe.

To shoot the picture, 500 head of cattle, 150 oxen, stray dogs, 250 extras and crewmen were assembled. During the shooting, the cast and crew stayed at the Santa Rita Hotel in Tucson, and would attend variety shows and baseball games. Upon arriving in Tucson, Arthur was initially dubious about working with Holden, her romantic interest in the film who was 18 years her junior. Holden insisted on performing his own riding scenes during chases and stunts. Filming was a significant challenge given the extreme summer heat, a factor for which the studio had not accounted, causing delays that sent the film well over budget at $2,000,000 and resulting in a $500,000 loss for Columbia. Ruggles was blamed for the loss and was never again sent to Tucson to shoot a film.

After filming, the site lay dormant for a few years during World War II, but was revived and converted into a full studio after the war. The studio continues today as Old Tucson Studios.

== Reception ==
The film premiered in Tucson on November 15, 1940, but was not released nationwide until two months later. The picture was not well received by critics, which influenced its mediocre box-office performance.

In a contemporary review for The New York Times, critic Theodore Strauss wrote: "For all its fastidious attention to the recreation of a physically authentic desert settlement ... Arizona lacks the most important thing of all—a story with credible characters. ... Arizona has neither the low swell of an epic theme, nor the crisp action of straight Western hokum. It sags under the weight of its own pretensions."

J. E. Smyth saw the film as an attempt to "repeat Cimarron's epic revisionism and historical seriousness." He described Arizona as an "early feminist western." Scott Weinberg of DVD Talk rated the film 3.5 out of 5, writing: "It's got a few nifty action scenes, a handful of funny bits, and just enough craftiness and character to keep you watching for the whole two hours. It's not as gritty as John Wayne or as romantic as Louis L'Amour, but the flick's a solid enough black & white throwback to keep the Western fans suitably entertained."

Victor Young was nominated for the Oscar for Best Original Score, while Lionel Banks and Robert Peterson were considered for the Academy Award for Best Art Direction, Black-and-White.

== See also ==
- List of films and television shows about the American Civil War
