= The Best Man Wins (1935 film) =

1935 American crime film directed by Erle C. Kenton

- Directed by: Erle C. Kenton
- Written by: Ben Grauman Kohn (story); Ethel Hill[Bruce Manning
- Starring: Edmund Lowe; Jack Holt; Bela Lugosi
- Cinematography: John Stumar
- Edited by: Otto Meyer
- Music by: Howard Jackson
- Production company: Columbia Pictures
- Distributed by: Columbia Pictures
- Release date: January 15, 1935
- Running time: 75 minutes
- Country: United States
- Language: English

The Best Man Wins is a 1935 American crime film directed by Erle C. Kenton and starring Edmund Lowe, Jack Holt and Bela Lugosi.

The film's sets were designed by the art director Lionel Banks.

== Plot ==
A diver saves his friend's life but loses his arm in the process. Later, unable to find work because of his disability, the diver agrees reluctantly to work for a criminal searching for lost treasure. Meanwhile, his friend has since become a police officer, and is assigned to break up the criminal's operation and arrest everyone in the gang—including the diver who saved his life.

== Cast ==
- Sam Flint as the doctor (uncredited)
- Forrester Harvey as Harry
- Jack Holt as Nick Roberts
- Edmund Lowe as Toby Warren
- Bela Lugosi as Doc Boehm
- J. Farrell MacDonald as captain—Harbor Patrol
- Florence Rice as Ann Barry

== Bibliography ==
- Michael L. Stephens. Art Directors in Cinema: A Worldwide Biographical Dictionary. McFarland, 1998.
