= Hit Parade of 1941 =

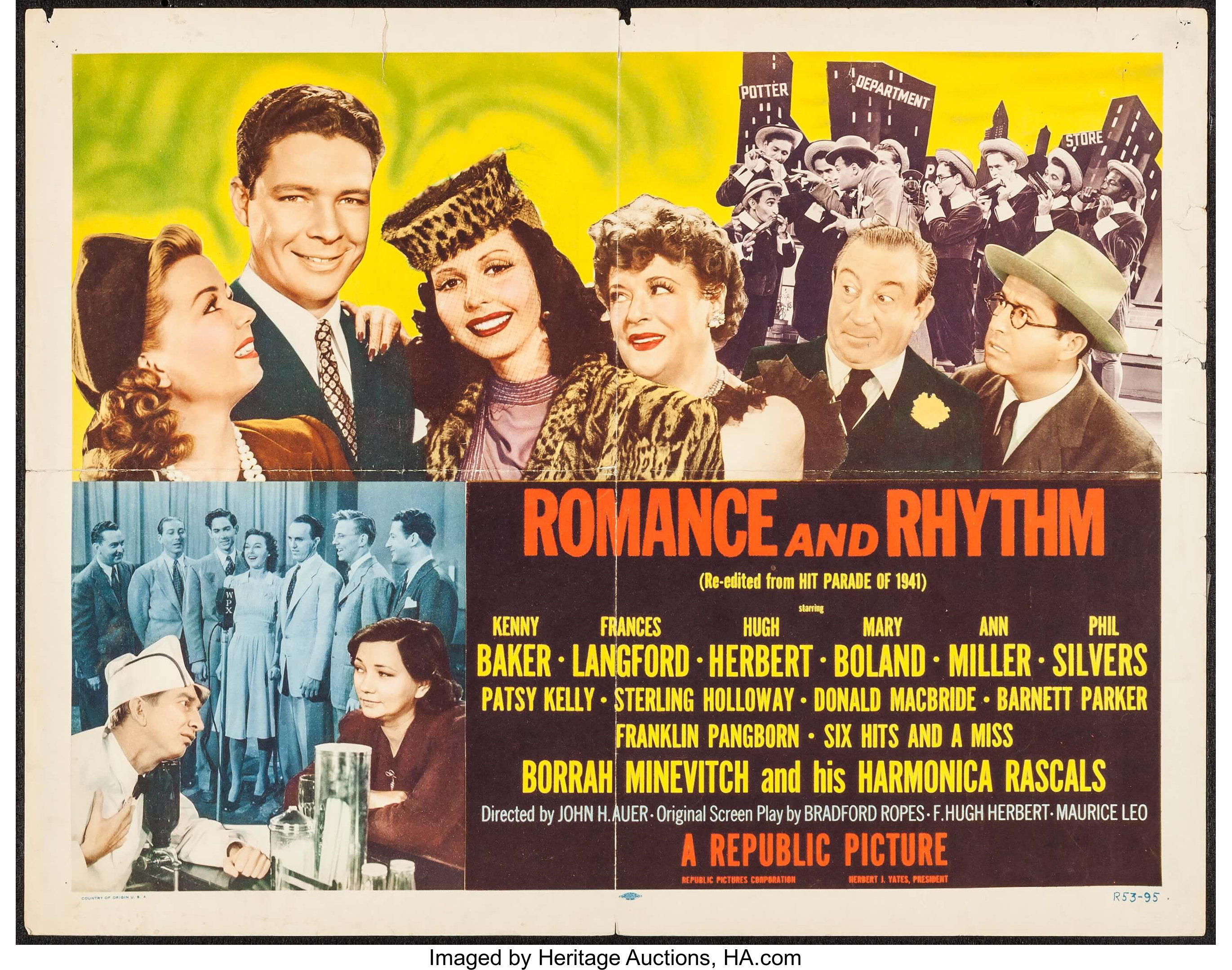
- Poster for Hit Parade of 1941 aka Romance and Rhythm
- Directed by: John H. Auer
- Written by: Bradford Ropes; F. Hugh Herbert; Maurice Leo
- Produced by: Sol C. Siegel
- Starring: Kenny Baker; Frances Langford; Hugh Herbert
- Cinematography: Jack A. Marta
- Edited by: William Morgan; Murray Seldeen
- Music by: Cy Feuer (musical director); Walter Scharf (uncredited)
- Production company: Republic Pictures
- Distributed by: Republic Pictures Corp.
- Release date: October 15, 1940
- Running time: 88 minutes
- Country: United States
- Language: English
- Budget: $500,000

Hit Parade of 1941 is a 1940 American Republic Pictures film written by Bradford Ropes, F. Hugh Herbert and Maurice Leo and was directed by John H. Auer.

Shot from early August to September 1940, in the 1950s, the film was cut to 52 minutes to be shown on television as Romance and Rhythm

== Plot ==
A small radio station in Brooklyn, WPX, is saved from going bankrupt by a backer (Mary Boland), who agrees to invest money for television equipment if the owner (Kenny Baker) allows her dancing daughter Annabelle (Ann Miller) to dance and sing on the screen. Due to her voice, her singing needs to be dubbed by the owner's girlfriend, Pat Abbott (Frances Langford). Problems arise when the owner starts dating Annabelle.

== Cast ==
- Kenny Baker as David Farraday
- Frances Langford as Pat Abbott
- Hugh Herbert as Ferdinand Farraday
- Ann Miller as Annabelle Potter
- Patsy Kelly as Judy Abbott
- Mary Boland as Emily Potter
- Phil Silvers as Charlie Moore
- Donald MacBride as Harrison
- Franklin Pangborn as Carter
- Emory Parnell as Policeman
- Borrah Minevitch and His Harmonica Rascals
- Sterling Holloway as Elmer to Soda Jerk
- Six Hits and a Miss as Singing Group

== Academy Award Nominations ==
It was nominated for the Oscar for Best Song at the 13th Academy Awards with the song "Who Am I?", with music by Jule Styne and lyrics by Walter Bullock. Also nominated for the Oscar for Best Original Score in the same ceremony for composer Cy Feuer.

== Songs ==
Music by Jule Styne, lyrics by Walter Bullock

- Who Am I?
- Swing Low, Sweet Rhythm
- The Little Old Lamp
- In The Cool of the Evening
- South American Ballet
