= In the Zone (play) =

Stage play by Eugene O'Neill

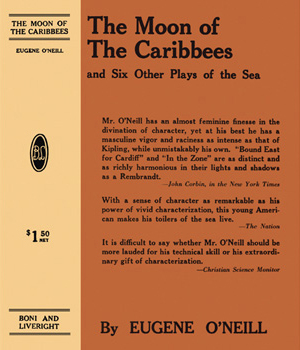
- First edition printing (1919) of one-act plays including In the Zone
- Written by: Eugene O'Neill
- Setting: The forecastle of the British tramp steamer Glencairn in 1915

Premiere
- Date premiered: 31 October 1917
- Place premiered: Comedy Theatre, New York City

In the Zone is a 1917 stage play by Eugene O'Neill.

== Plot ==
The adventures of the crew of a small tramp steamer in World War I.

== Characters ==
The cast of characters in In the Zone is listed in the 1919 collection The Moon of the Caribbees and Six Other Plays of the Sea.

- Smitty
- Davis
- Swanson
- Scotty
- Ivan
- Paul
- Jack
- Driscoll
- Cocky

== Adaptations ==
=== Opening ===
In the Zone opened October 31, 1917 by The Washington Square Players at The Comedy Theatre.

=== 1946 British TV version ===
The BBC produced a version in 1946. The cast included Bonar Colleano, Finlay Currie, Alec Mango and Jack Newmark. Broadcast live, the transmissions were not recorded, and as such it is lost.

== 1957 Australian TV version ==
In the Zone
- Based on: play by Eugene O'Neill
- Country of origin: Australia
- Original language: English

Production
- Running time: 30 mins
- Production company: ABC

Original release
- Network: ABN-2
- Release: 19 March 1957 (Sydney, live)
- Release: 5 April 1957 (Melbourne, taped)

A 1957 version of In the Zone was a very early attempt at Australian television drama, airing during the first few months of TV in that country.

It was produced in Sydney and telerecorded/kinescoped for Melbourne broadcast (these were the only two cities in Australia with television at the time), and aired on ABC, and was broadcast in a 30-minute time-slot.

Archival status is unknown. Most of the very early Australian television drama were adaptations of overseas stage plays, or new versions of works originally presented on the BBC in the UK. In the Zone was an example of both, as the play had previously been presented on the BBC during 1946. It is not known if the two versions used the same script.

=== Premise ===
The lives of the crew of a tramp steamer in World War I.

=== Cast ===
- Bruce Beeby as Davis
- Richard Meikle as Jack
- Keith Buckley as Scotty
- Owen Weingott as Smitty
- John Bluthal as Driscoll
- Bruce Wishart as Cocky

=== Other versions ===
A different version may have aired on British television in 1960.

The play formed part of the basis for the 1940 film The Long Voyage Home.

== See also ==
- List of live television plays broadcast on the Australian Broadcasting Corporation (1956–1969)
