= The Boys from Syracuse (film) =

1940 film by A. Edward Sutherland

- Directed by: A. Edward Sutherland
- Screenplay by: Leonard Spigelgass; Paul Gerard Smith; Charles Grayson
- Produced by: Jules Levey
- Starring: Allan Jones
- Cinematography: Joseph A. Valentine
- Edited by: Milton Carruth
- Music by: Charles Previn
- Distributed by: Universal Pictures
- Release dates: July 18, 1940; (Syracuse, New York)
- Running time: 73 minutes
- Country: United States
- Language: English

The Boys from Syracuse is a 1940 American musical film directed by A. Edward Sutherland, based on the 1938 stage musical by Richard Rodgers and Lorenz Hart, which in turn was loosely based on the play The Comedy of Errors by William Shakespeare. The film was nominated for two Academy Awards, one for Best Visual Effects (John P. Fulton, Bernard B. Brown, Joe Lapis) and one for Best Art Direction (Jack Otterson).

== Cast ==
- Allan Jones as Antipholus of Ephesus and Antipholus of Syracuse
- Irene Hervey as Adriana
- Martha Raye as Luce
- Joe Penner as Dromio of Ephesus and Dromio of Syracuse
- Alan Mowbray as Angelo
- Charles Butterworth as Duke of Ephesus
- Rosemary Lane as Phyllis
- Samuel S. Hinds as Angeen
- Tom Dugan as Octavius
- Spencer Charters as Turnkey
- Doris Lloyd as Woman
- Larry J. Blake as Announcer
- Eddie Acuff as Taxi Cab Driver
- Matt McHugh as Bartender
- David Oliver as Messenger
- Bess Flowers as Woman
- Cyril Ring as Guard
- Julie Carter as Girl
- Eric Blore as Pinch
- William Desmond as Citizen (uncredited)

== Reception ==
The film received mixed reviews from critics.

Bosley Crowther of The New York Times called the film "a light-weight story of mistaken identities which brushes quickly over the more intriguing implications of bedroom farce and relies in the main for its humors upon familiar low-comedy mugging and anachronistic gags. Some of them are funny—the first two or three times, anyhow ... But a lot of modern slapstick and confusion only goes so far in ancient dress—and, in this case, it isn't far enough."

Variety wrote, "Sophisticated audiences will find the gags too unsubtle and the action too obvious, but the greater part of the film audience will relish the out-and-out screwiness of the whole idea." Harrison's Reports wrote that the film "should, for the most part, prove satisfying to the masses, for it has plentiful gags, a few good songs, and romance." Film Daily called it "packed with laughs" and "definitely timely as escapist entertainment." In a review for The New Yorker, Sally Benson reported that the film had revived the stage musical "not very successfully." However, she wrote, "if you can stand seeing double, and don't mind hearing American slang in ancient Greece, and can even smile feebly over chariots equipped with taximeters, you may be able to totter out of your nearest air-cooled theater with a sultry sort of satisfaction."
