= Women in War =

1940 film

- Film poster
- Directed by: John H. Auer
- Written by: Doris Anderson; F. Hugh Herbert
- Produced by: Sol C. Siegel
- Starring: Wendy Barrie; Elsie Janis
- Cinematography: Jack A. Marta
- Music by: Cy Feuer
- Distributed by: Republic Pictures
- Release date: June 6, 1940
- Running time: 71 minutes
- Country: United States
- Language: English

Women in War is a 1940 American war film about the nurses of the British Voluntary Aid Detachment during the Battle of France. Directed by John H. Auer and starring Wendy Barrie, Elsie Janis and Patric Knowles, it was nominated for an Oscar for Best Visual Effects (Howard Lydecker, William Bradford, Ellis J. Thackery, Herbert Norsch).

== Plot ==
Socialite Pamela Starr meets Mr Tedford, an older man in a London night club. After he escorts her home he tries to enter her flat feeling he has deserved the right to sleep with her as he has paid for her entertainment. Pamela thrusts a £5 note in his hands as reimbursement and attempts to enter her room but Tedford will not let her. The spirited Pamela strikes the drunken Tedford sending him across the landing where he crashes through a railing over the stairwell sending Tedford to his death.

The ensuing court case does not go well for Pamela as her playgirl lifestyle is paraded as evidence against her, and to Pamela's surprise, Mr. Tedford was actually a British Army captain on leave from the war front. Watching the trial is Matron O'Neil, who was formerly Pamela's mother until she divorced her husband and left to go nursing around the troubled world to help those in need. Pamela had never known her mother and her late libertine father had denied her moral leadership and discipline in raising her. O'Neil and Pamela's defense solicitor concoct an arrangement where Pamela will not be charged with Tedford's death if she volunteers to be an Army nurse in France. Pamela is assigned to a VAD Detachment led by Matron O'Neil with Pamela still unaware that O'Neil is her mother.

Pamela's infamous reputation precedes her and furthermore the fiancée of one of her fellow nurses, Flt. Lt. Larry Hall of the RAF falls in love with Pamela. The tensions of the nurses continue as their detachment is sent to a dangerous area of the battle line.

== Cast ==
- Elsie Janis as Matron O'Neil, formerly Mrs. Starr
- Wendy Barrie as Pamela Starr
- Patric Knowles as Flt Lt. Larry Hall
- Mae Clarke as Gail Halliday
- Dennie Moore as Ginger
- Dorothy Peterson as Sister Frances
- Billy Gilbert as Pierre, the Cobbler
- Colin Tapley as Capt. Tedford, the Masher
- Stanley Logan as Col. Starr
- Barbara Pepper as Millie, Irish Nurse
- Pamela Randell as Phyllis Grant, Nurse
- Lawrence Grant as Sir Gordon, Defense Attorney
- Lester Matthews as Sir Humphrey, Prosecuting attorney
- Holmes Herbert as Chief Justice
- Peter Cushing as Capt. Evans
