= R. T. Layton =

Special effects artist

- Born: Robert Townsend Layton; 16 April 1884; Cambridge, England
- Died: 3 November 1941 (aged 57); Los Angeles, California, U.S.
- Occupation: Special effects artist
- Years active: 1937–1940

Robert Townsend Layton (16 April 1884 – 3 November 1941) was an English special effects artist. He was nominated for an Oscar for Best Special Effects on the film The Long Voyage Home at the 13th Academy Awards.
