= The Invisible Man Returns =

1940 film by Joe May

- Theatrical release poster
- Directed by: Joe May
- Screenplay by: Lester K. Cole; Curt Siodmak
- Story by: Joe May; Curt Siodmak; Cedric Belfrage
- Based on: The Invisible Man suggested by 1897 novel by H. G. Wells
- Starring: Sir Cedric Hardwicke; Vincent Price; Nan Grey; John Sutton
- Cinematography: Milton Krasner
- Edited by: Frank Gross
- Music by: Hans J. Salter; Frank Skinner
- Production company: Universal Pictures
- Distributed by: Universal Pictures
- Release date: 12 January 1940
- Running time: 81 minutes
- Country: United States
- Budget: $243,750
- Box office: $815,000

The Invisible Man Returns is a 1940 American horror science fiction film directed by Joe May. The film stars Cedric Hardwicke, Vincent Price, Nan Grey and John Sutton. The film is a sequel to the 1933 film The Invisible Man, and the second film in the Invisible Man film series, loosely based on the novel by H. G. Wells. The film is about Sir Geoffrey Radcliffe (Price) who is condemned for a murder he did not commit, which leads to him begging Dr. Frank Griffin (Sutton) to inject him with the invisibility serum despite Griffin's warning that the serum will drive him mad.

Following the commercial success of Son of Frankenstein, Universal Studios announced the development of The Invisible Man Returns in March 1939. The film went through a few screenwriters and directors before choosing Joe May to direct and Lester K. Cole and Curt Siodmak to write the script. Production went behind schedule early into the production and led to late night filming and production ending in November. The film was released on January 12, 1940. The special effects by John P. Fulton, Bernard B. Brown and William Hedgcock received an Oscar nomination in the category Best Special Effects.

== Plot ==
Sir Geoffrey Radcliffe is sentenced to death for the murder of his brother Michael, a crime he did not commit. Geoffrey, his best friend Dr. Frank Griffin – the brother of the original invisible man – and Geoffrey's fiancée Helen form a plan to inject Geoffrey with the invisibility drug if his appeal fails, which it does. As Radcliffe's execution nears, he suddenly vanishes from his cell, just after Dr Griffin has visited him. When Detective Sampson from Scotland Yard hears the name Dr. Griffin, he recalls the invisible man case, and guesses the truth.

Dr. Griffin has left clothes for Geoffrey at a pre-arranged place, and Helen hides him in a cottage in the woods. Radcliffe searches for the real murderer before the drug causes him to go insane, while Dr. Griffin continues searching for the antidote. At Geoffrey's request, Dr. Griffin promises to stop him from causing anyone harm if he shows signs of the madness that inflicted the original invisible man nine years earlier.

The Radcliffe family owns a mining operation. The recently hired employee Willie Spears is suddenly promoted within the company, stirring Radcliffe's suspicions. After forcing Spears' car off the road, Spears is frightened into revealing that Richard Cobb, Radcliffe's cousin, is the murderer. Unfortunately, Dr. Griffin and Helen see signs that the drug is having an adverse effect on Radcliffe. They secretly drug him, to make him sleep, and when he wakes up it seems that the effect of the invisibility drug had been temporary. However, he has been faking and soon escapes, and goes after Cobb. After a confrontation, a chase scene ensues during which Radcliffe is struck by a bullet from Sampson. Cobb is fatally injured by falling from a coal wagon but confesses to the murder before he dies.

Now cleared of all wrongdoing, Radcliffe, dying from blood loss and exposure, makes his way to Dr. Griffin. A number of Radcliffe's employees volunteer to donate blood to Radcliffe. The transfusion succeeds, making Radcliffe visible again, allowing the doctor to operate and save his life.

== Cast ==
- Sir Cedric Hardwicke as Richard Cobb
- Vincent Price as Geoffrey Radcliffe
- Nan Grey as Helen Manson
- John Sutton as Dr. Frank Griffin
- Cecil Kellaway as Inspector Sampson
- Alan Napier as Willie Spears
- Forrester Harvey as Ben Jenkins
- Paul England as Detective

== Production ==
=== Pre-production ===
Universal Pictures first announced the development of The Invisible Man Returns in March 1939, around the time Son of Frankenstein was doing well at the box office. In May, Joe May was announced as the director of the film with either Boris Karloff or Bela Lugosi hinted at playing the lead. Days after this announcement, Rowland V. Lee was then announced as the film's director.

The script also went through several different writers, with W.P. Lipscomb announced who had previously done the films Les Misérables, A Tale of Two Cities, and Pygmalion. Michael Hogan, who had worked on the adaptation of Rebecca, was later given screenwriting duties. May eventually became the director of the film. The film's screenplay was finally written by Curt Siodmak (credited as Kurt Siodmak) and Lester K. Cole based on a story by May, Siodmak and Cedric Belfrage.

On June 29, The Hollywood Reporter announced that Universal was looking for an unknown actor to fill the role, specifically noting they required a "young, good-looking contender even though he would remain invisible until the last reel". The three principal roles were given to actors who had recently completed work on Tower of London: Vincent Price, Nan Grey and John Sutton. Sir Cedric Hardwicke was given top billing in the film despite the role being a more supportive position. Price commented that he got along with director Joe May because "May was difficult to understand, as he spoke no English. I had something of a rapport with him because of my knowledge of German".

=== Filming ===
The Invisible Man Returns was described in the book Universal Horrors as "being plagued with production problems". The film's budget of $243,750 and 27-day filming schedule were not adequate for the special effects and May's time to direct. Filming began on October 13, 1939. The studios back lot was turned into an English mining town which included a coal pile and coal escalator that was 75 feet long. By the second week of shooting, the film was already behind schedule. By November the crew was working until midnight with little expectation that the film would be done on time.

Vincent Price when he was not covered by bandages or special effects only appears as himself for one minute in the film. Price spoke on the film saying that the special effects were done with Price being draped in black velvet and working against a set draped in black velvet. Price also spoke about working with Hardwicke, who he recalled "didn't like doing this film; he was facing home problems at the time. We became very close". Production ended on the film on November 11.

=== Post-production ===
Following the main production three to four days of post-production work needed to be done for the special effects. This was supervised by the special effects artist John Fulton who worked 15 nights, with the last day of shooting having May work his crew until 4:15 am. The score of the film makes use of Frank Skinner's score from Son of Frankenstein, while Hans J. Salter's main title score would be re-used in Man-Made Monster (1941), The Strange Case of Doctor Rx (1942), and Son of Dracula (1943).

== Release ==
The Invisible Man Returns was distributed theatrically by Universal Pictures on January 12, 1940. The film grossed a total of $815,000 from both domestic and international box office rentals. At New York's Rialto Theatre, the ticket sales were equal to that of Tower of London which was their previous all-time record breaker in the previous season.

The film was followed with a sequel, the comedy film The Invisible Woman in 1940. The film received a pseudo-remake with Abbott and Costello Meet the Invisible Man in 1951 with the Invisible Man character being re-written as a boxer but with much of the dialogue from the film being lifted from The Invisible Man Returns. Another unofficial remake was the Mexican production El Hombre Que Lorgro' ser Invisible which featured the same plot as The Invisible Man Returns but with the ending being taken from Philip Wylie's novel The Murderer Invisible.

== Reception ==
From contemporary reviews, Archer Winsten praised the film in The New York Post, stating that "the suspense, accruing from all sides, mounts to an impressive total" and specifically praised Hardwicke who "accomplishes his shift from early suavity to gibbering fear with a conviction rarely seen in unimportant or trick effect films". Kate Cameron of The New York Daily News stated that "some of the novelty of the strange situation has worn off" and that the film had some of the humor that "made the Topper so popular". Frank Nugent of The New York Times negatively compared the film to The Invisible Man, stating it was "neither so horrendous nor so humorous" as the original film. Nugent blamed this on the popularity of the film Topper and that the script was "annoyingly unoriginal".

The special effects by John P. Fulton, Bernard B. Brown and William Hedgcock received an Oscar nomination in the category Best Special Effects. The film lost to The Thief of Bagdad.

On the review aggregator website Rotten Tomatoes, 87% of 31 critics' reviews are positive, with an average rating of 5.8/10. Metacritic, which uses a weighted average, assigned the film a score of 48 out of 100, based on 4 critics, indicating "mixed or average" reviews.

== See also ==
- List of horror films of the 1940s
- List of science fiction films of the 1940s
- List of Vincent Price works
- List of Universal Pictures films (1940–1949)
