= Society of Makeup Artists =

Former American make-up artist professional organization

The Society of Makeup Artists was a professional organization, based in the US.

Hollywood cinema credits following a make-up artist member would be designated with SMA (similar to MPSE or ACE).

== Presidents ==
Among the presidents of the organization was John Chambers, of Planet of the Apes movie fame.

Other members included Gordon Bau and David Lawrence.

== See also ==
- Clé de Peau Beauté
- Make-Up Artists and Hair Stylists Guild
