= Lionel Banks =

American art director

- Born: June 22, 1901; Salt Lake City, Utah, U.S.
- Died: March 20, 1950 (aged 48); Los Angeles, California, U.S.
- Occupation: Art director
- Years active: 1935-1949

Lionel Banks (June 22, 1901 in Salt Lake City, Utah – March 20, 1950 in Los Angeles, California) was an American art director. From 1935 to 1949, he worked on over 200 films, such as Leo McCarey's The Awful Truth (1937), Howard Hawks' South American set Only Angels Have Wings (1939) and his rapid fire comedy classic the following year His Girl Friday, most of the Blondie B-movies, Alexander Hall's turn of the century fantasy Here Comes Mr. Jordan (1941) and Charles Vidor's lush Frédéric Chopin biopic A Song to Remember in 1945.

Banks was nominated for an Academy Award seven times, for Holiday (1938), Mr. Smith Goes to Washington (1939), Arizona (1940), Ladies in Retirement (1941), The Talk of the Town (1942), Address Unknown and Cover Girl (both 1944) but never won.

== Selected filmography ==
- The Best Man Wins (1935)
- Murder in Greenwich Village (1937)
- Her First Beau (1941)
- Stand By All Networks (1942)
- Two Señoritas from Chicago (1943)
- Louisiana Hayride (1944)
