= Santa Rita Hotel =

Former historic building in Tucson, Arizona

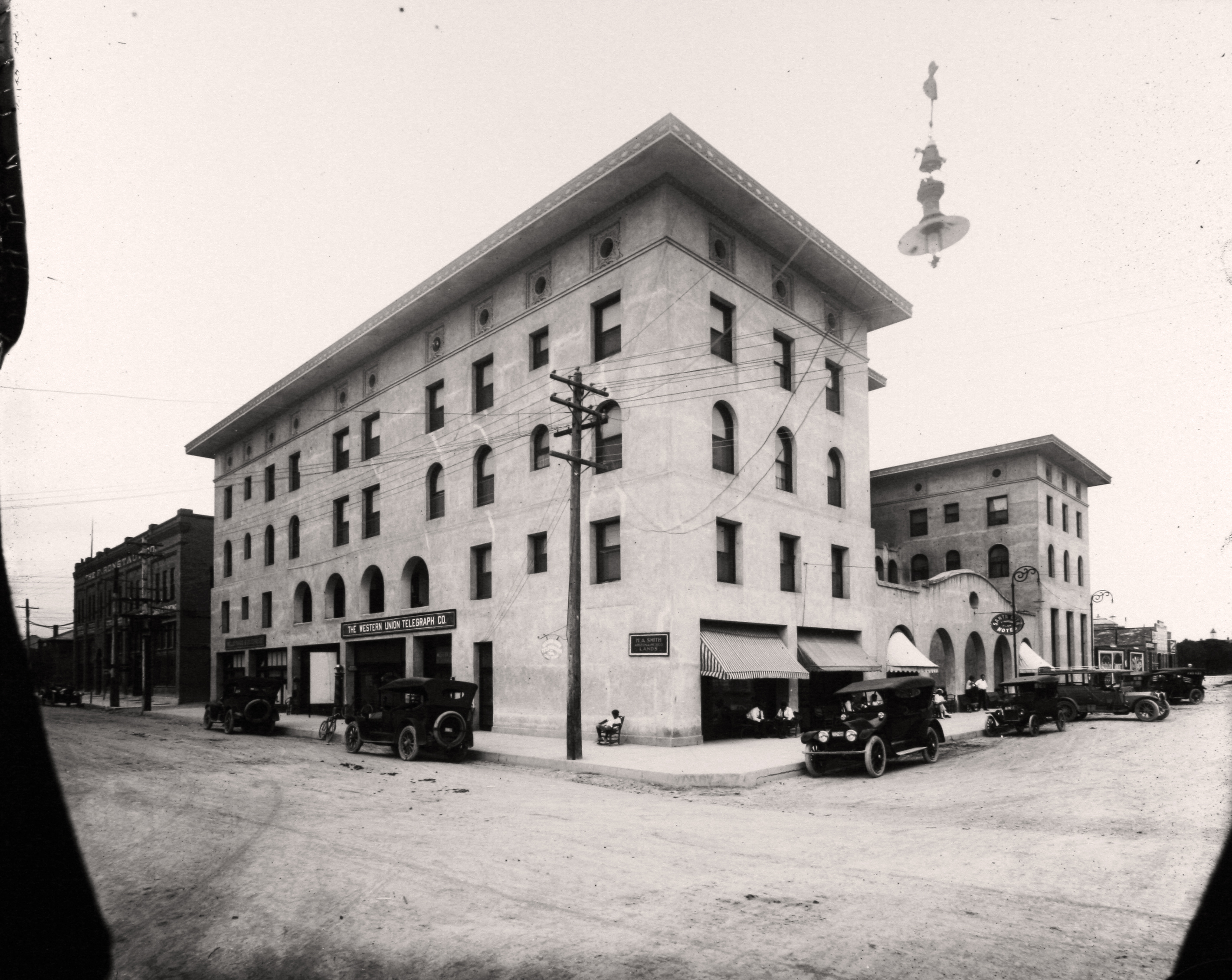
- Santa Rita Hotel, 1904

- Location within the United States

General information
- Location: United States, Broadway Boulevard and Scott Avenue
- Coordinates: 32.2209°N 110.9730°W
- Opening: February 1, 1904
- Closed: April 30, 1972
- Cost: $175,000
- Owner: Iaeger
- Management: Iaeger

Technical details
- Floor count: 6

Design and construction
- Architects: Henry Trost, 1903; William and Alexander Curlett, 1917
- Main contractor: Quintus Monier

Other information
- Number of rooms: 101
- Number of restaurants: 2

Santa Rita Hotel was a historic building located in downtown Tucson, Arizona. It was designed by architect Henry Trost in the Mission Revival Style and built in 1903 by Quintus Monier. The hotel was considered the finest hotel in the Arizona Territory at the time of its opening.

The construction of the hotel project was a major moment in Tucson’s early twentieth century history and represented both a major investment into the territory and the introduction of amenities and refinement that would attract Americans from the east. The hotel was completed at a cost of $175,000 USD and featured 101 guest rooms.

== History ==
The location of the Santa Rita Hotel was on the southeast corner of the insertion of Broadway Boulevard and Scott Avenue in Tucson Arizona. The area was part of the old Military Plaza that had been occupied by the U.S. Cavalry at an outpost called Camp Lowell. The land was subdivided and block 257 lots 2 and 3 auctioned by the City of Tucson and given to developer R. H. Raphael, of Los Angeles, “in consideration of his building a $75.000 hotel thereon.”

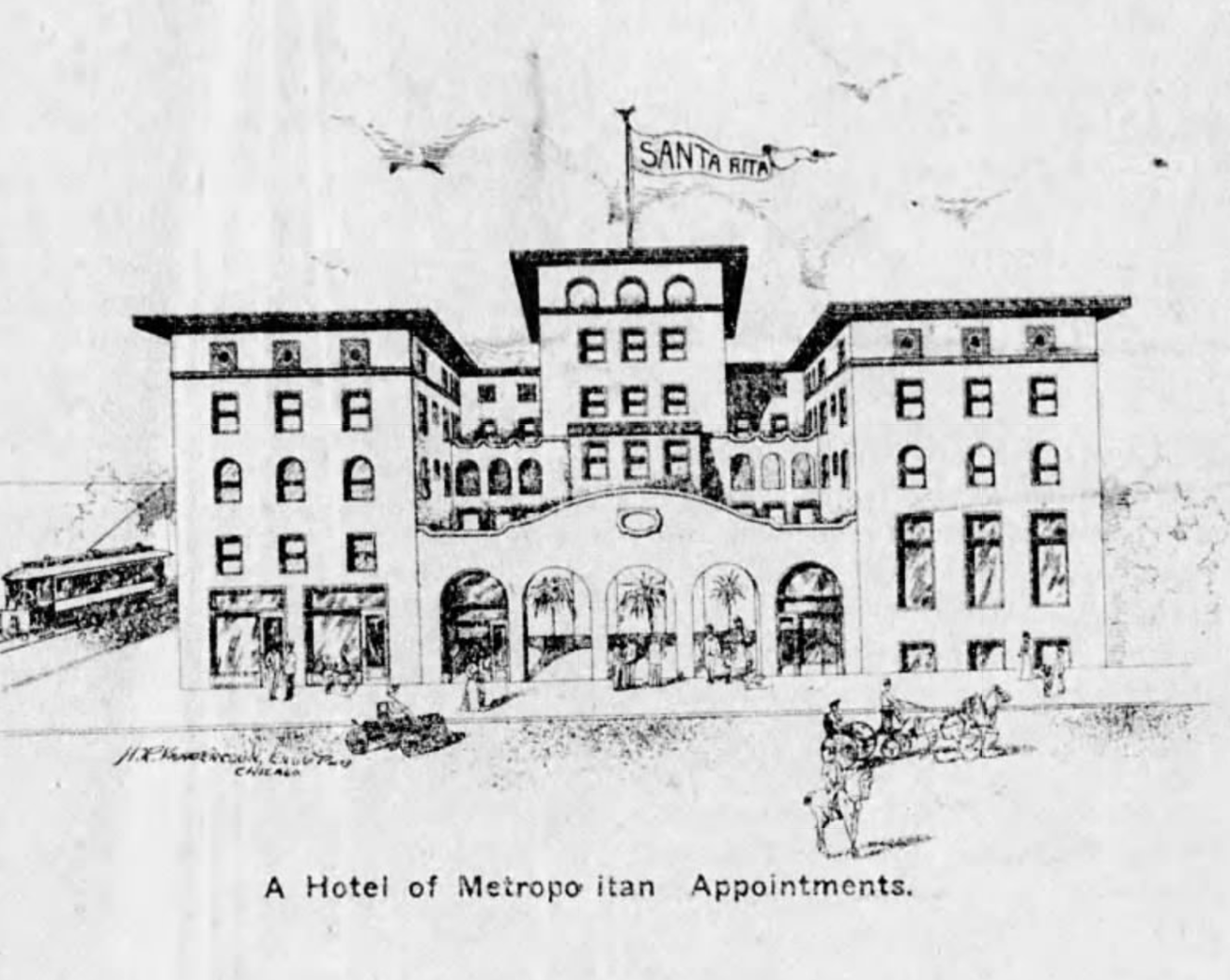
Santa Rita Hotel, Tucson, Arizona

The hotel was billed as the ‘Finest in the Territory.’ Raphael sold the unfinished hotel to Charles M. Shannon of Clifton, Arizona in February 1903. Arizona papers at the time reflected that: “This will be welcome news to the people of Tucson. It shows that Arizona people have confidence in Arizona investments, and that Arizona capitalists are sufficiently enterprising and public-spirited to participate actively in local enterprises.” The hotel and property was deed to the Santa Rita Company owned by partners and Tucson entrepreneurs Levi Manning, Julius Goldbaum and Federico José María Ronstadt.

The builder and contractor of the hotel was architect, stonemason and brick maker Quintus Monier, builder of major projects in the southwest including the Cathedral of Santa Fe. The construction was supervised by J. V. McNiel and was developed through an agreement with the City of Tucson. The roof was completed by John Burke of the Los Angeles Roofing Company, the plumbing completed by Julian Brothers.

In November 1903, the property was leased to the hotel management firm Malin and Browder of Houston Texas, who managed the Bristol House in Houston, the Laclede Hotel (Lindell Hotel) in St. Louis, and the Menger Hotel in San Antonio.

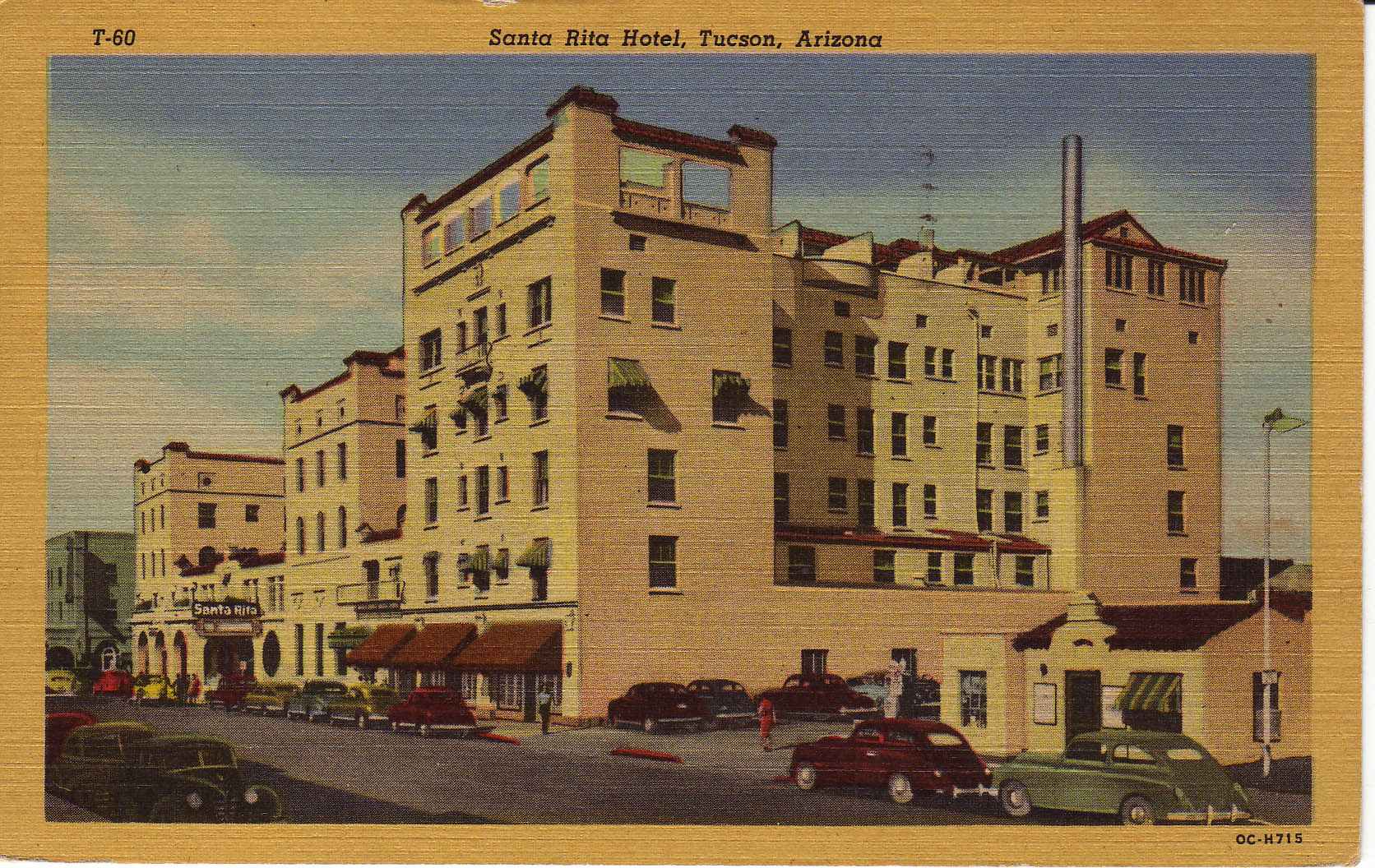
Santa Rita Hotel, Tucson, Arizona

The Arizona Daily Star reported before the opening: “The new structure will not only be a credit to Tucson, but it will be one of the finest hotels in the entire west, and by all odds the finest and most modern equipped hotel in this territory [...] The building of this magnificence, modern hotel means much for Tucson. Tousis and people of means will in the future be able to find accommodation and service of the highest order right here in our beautiful city.

The City of Tucson made numerous public policy changes to support the success of the hotel venture. In August 1903 the Tucson city Council passed a resolution to prohibit gambling near the hotel to assure the property would not be “blighted by gambling.” and in December 1903 issued a license to the Santa Rita to have a bar and install a roulette wheel. In December 1903 and with construction almost finished the Mayor and Council approved an electric streetcar system with the first line to be operated running from the Santa Rita Hotel to the Street Railway Company Park a mile beyond the University of Arizona.

The main entrance of the hotel fronted Scott Avenue with balconies overlooking an open courtyard 30 ft wide by 32 ft deep. The courtyard lead to a tiled roof rotunda 50 ft x 80 ft and 26 ft high and then to a lobby. There was an oak finished dining room, cafe and bandstand. The grand lobby included a marble staircase to the second floor menenie level. Eight storefronts fronted Scott and Broadway. All of the ornamental architectural plaster relief work was designed and fabricated by artist and Henry Trost associate Gustav Zierold.

At the end of December 1903 the completed and furnished hotel was sold to L.J.F. Iaeger for $200,000 USD. Iaeger was the proprietor of the Montezuma Hotel in Nogales and was for a timer owner of the three Southern Pacific Railroad Hotels in Arizona: Yuma, Tucson and Bowie

== Opening ==
The opening of the Santa Rita on February 1, 1904 was a monumental event. Two thousands people (25% of the City of Tucson population at the time) attended the opening. The local paper reported that “Fashionably dressed women, accompanied by their husbands or friends availed themselves of the excellent opportunity of inspecting this imposing edifice and thronged the lobby, the rotunda and the corridors.” Levie Manning was presented with a chest of silver in token of the appreciation of his efforts. The silver setting of 600 pieces was manufactured by the Gorbam Silver Company.

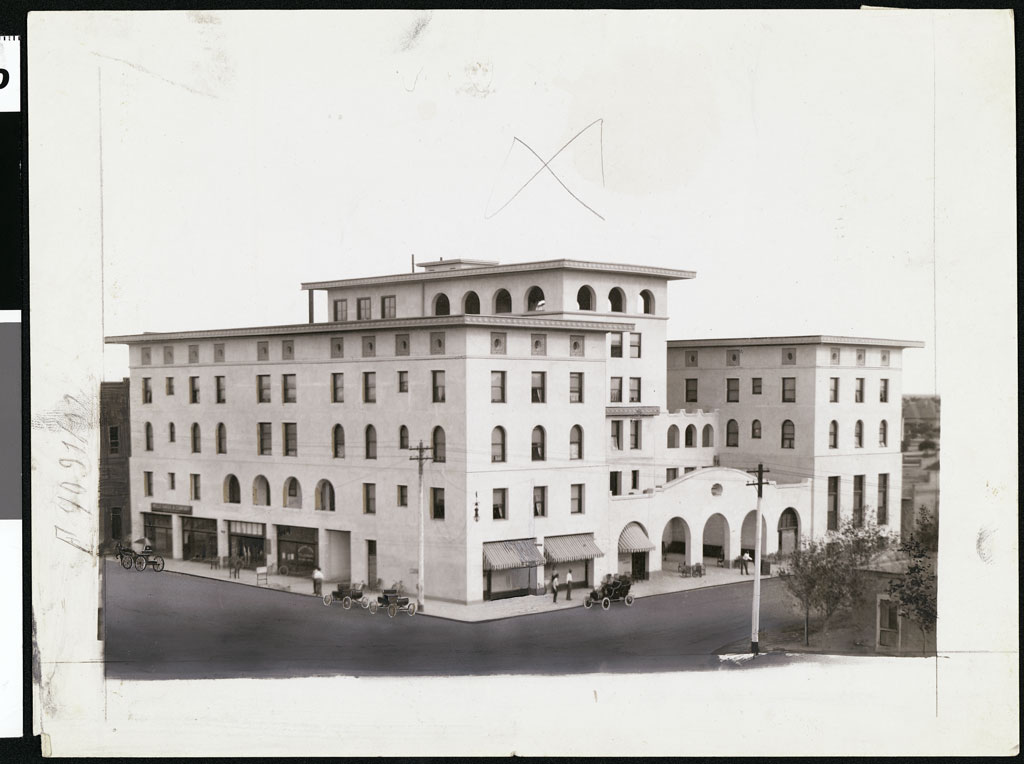
Santa Rita Hotel, Tucson, Arizona

The finished hotel was six stories tall with a full basement and two wings with four stories in height featuring electric elevators and steam heat. On the sixth floor was a roof garden and dance hall. Each room included a private telephone connection and private bathroom. All of the furniture was purchased through the Tucson firm of L. Zeckendorf & Company.

The Santa Rita Hotel was an important social and cultural touchstone in Tucson. It played host to movie stars and industrialists. The hotel hosted important art exhibits and cultural events.

In 1917, Iaeger, hired Los Angeles based architectural firm William and Alexander Curlett, to design a 160-room wing for the hotel. The wing was constructed from cast concrete and designed in the Spanish Revival style.

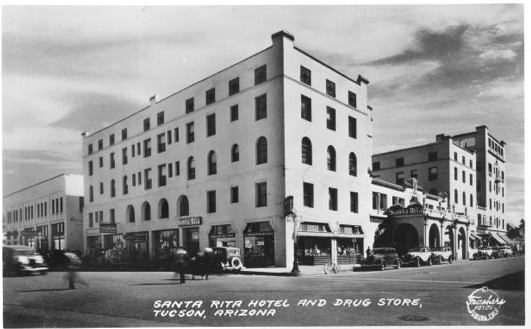
Santa Rita Hotel, Tucson, Arizona

== Closing and Demolition ==
The original 1904 hotel building was closed on April 30, 1972 and demolished as part of a plan to redevelop the property. The 1917 addition was demolished in 2009 by UniSource Energy Services and their subsidiary Tucson Electric Power, despite the pleas of preservationists.

== Famous Guests of the Hotel ==
According to historian David Leighton, in 1962, Martin Luther King Jr. stayed at the Santa Rita Hotel on his visit to Tucson that year.

In 1949, thirteen years before Rev. King's visit, the Santa Rita Hotel barred Larry Doby and his wife from staying there with the rest of the Cleveland Indians during spring training. A few months earlier, Doby was one of the heroes of Cleveland's first World Series victory. Doby was the first Black player in the American League, and he is now a member of baseball's Hall of Fame.

In 1963, "The Fugitive," Dr. Richard Kimble, stayed in the Santa Rita Hotel. It is featured 12:00 into the Pilot episode, "Fear in a Desert City," as David Jansen is exiting the building.
