= Robert Peterson (art director) =

American art director

- Born: August 15, 1909; Idaho Springs, Colorado, USA
- Died: January 10, 1979 (aged 69); Los Angeles, California
- Occupation: Art director
- Years active: 1940-1979

Robert Peterson (August 15, 1909 – January 10, 1979) was an American art director. He received an Academy Award nomination in the category of Best Art Direction for the 1940 film Arizona. He died at the age of 69 in Los Angeles.

== Selected filmography ==
- Arizona (1940)
