= Planet of the Apes (disambiguation) =

Planet of the Apes is a film and media franchise.

Planet of the Apes may also refer to:

== Planet of the Apes media ==
- Planet of the Apes (novel), a 1963 science fiction novel by Pierre Boulle that initiated the franchise; see also: List of Planet of the Apes novels
  - Planet of the Apes (1968 film), the first film in the franchise
  - Beneath the Planet of the Apes (1970), the second film in the franchise
  - Escape from the Planet of the Apes (1971), the third film in the franchise
  - Conquest of the Planet of the Apes (1972), the fourth film in the franchise
  - Battle for the Planet of the Apes (1973), the fifth film in the franchise
    - Planet of the Apes (TV series), a 1974 television series based on the 1968 film and sequels
    - Return to the Planet of the Apes, a 1975 animated television series based on the 1968 film and sequels
  - Planet of the Apes (2001 film), a remake of the first film and the sixth film in the franchise
  - Rise of the Planet of the Apes (2011), the seventh film in the franchise
  - Dawn of the Planet of the Apes (2014), the eighth film in the franchise
  - War for the Planet of the Apes (2017), the ninth film in the franchise
  - Kingdom of the Planet of the Apes (2024), the tenth film in the franchise
- Planet of the Apes (comics), comics tie-ins to the franchise
  - Planet of the Apes/Green Lantern, a 2017 comic book limited series crossover with DC Comics
  - Planet of the Apes: Visionaries, a 2018 graphic novel based on the screenplay by Rod Serling
- Planet of the Apes (video game), a 2001 video game

== Other ==
- Planet of the Apes: Best of Guano Apes, a 2004 greatest hits album by Guano Apes
- "Planet of the Apes", a 2000 song by Mindless Self Indulgence from Frankenstein Girls Will Seem Strangely Sexy
- "Planet of the Apes", a 2003 song by the Kovenant from SETI
- "Planet of the Apes", a 2011 song by the Devin Townsend Project from Deconstruction
- "Planet of the Apes", a 2015 song by the Asian Kung-Fu Generation from Wonder Future

== See also ==
- Planet of da Apes, an album by Da Lench Mob
- Planet of the Apps, American reality show
- Planet of the Apemen: Battle for Earth, 2011 UK BBC TV series
- Apeworld, setting found in the RPG Terra Primate
- "Planet of Monkeys", an episode of the 2019 Indian animated TV series Chacha Chaudhary
- "Planet of the Capes", a 1991 episode of Darkwing Duck
- Monkey Planet (disambiguation)
