= Monkey Planet (disambiguation) =

Monkey Planet or variation, may refer to:

- Monkey Planet (novel) (French: La Planète des singes, lit. 'Planet of (the) Monkeys'), a sci-fi novel by Pierre F. Boulle, also released as Planet of the Apes
  - Monkey Planet (TV series), 2014 UK BBC TV series
  - Monkeys' Planet (Japanese: 猿の惑星, romanized: Saru no Wakusei, lit. 'Planet of (the) Monkeys'), Japanese manga comic book adaptation of "Planet of the Apes"; see Planet of the Apes (comics)
- "Monkey Planet" (TV episode), 2015 U.S. animated TV episode of All Hail King Julien
- "Planet of Monkeys" (TV episode), 2019 Indian animated TV episode of Chacha Chaudhary

== See also ==
- Monkey World, primate sanctuary and rescue center
- Earth (planet), the cradle of humanity
- Planet of the Apes (disambiguation)
- Monkey (disambiguation)
- Planet (disambiguation)
