= POTA =

POTA may refer to:

- Planet of the Apes (disambiguation)
- Rafael Cordero Santiago Port of the Americas
- Prevention of Terrorism Act
- Parks On The Air (Amateur Radio activity)

== See also ==
- Pota, a village in India
