= List of Planet of the Apes novels =

The Planet of the Apes novels began with Pierre Boulle's novel La Planète des singes was translated and reprinted several times after its original publication in 1963. All four of the original film series' sequels spawned novelizations by established science fiction writers of the day, each of which went through multiple reprints of their own. Michael Avallone wrote the novelization for Beneath the Planet of the Apes in 1970. Jerry Pournelle, who later co-authored Lucifer's Hammer and The Mote in God's Eye, wrote the Escape from the Planet of the Apes novelization in 1974. John Jakes, former Science Fiction Writers of America president, wrote the Conquest of the Planet of the Apes novelization in 1972. David Gerrold, scriptwriter for the Star Trek episode "The Trouble with Tribbles", wrote the Battle for the Planet of the Apes novelization in 1973. Novelizations of the live action and animated television series were also produced. William T. Quick wrote the 2001 Planet of the Apes novelization; he also wrote two prequel novels (Planet of the Apes: The Fall (2002) and Planet of the Apes: Colony (2003)), and several other book tie-ins were published.

Key:
All novels published as paperback editions, except where indicated.
†	Hardcover first edition
^	Children's or young adult book
◊	Published as an ebook exclusive
‡	Included in omnibus or collection
#	Published as a numbered novel
≈	Variant or retitled novel
Teal	Book line or flagship series name
Navy	Miniseries name
Pink	Crossover series name
ed.	Omnibus or collection editor(s).
et al.	Multiple authors, see note

== Award Books (1973–1974) ==
Award Books was the first licensed publisher of Planet of the Apes tie-in fiction.

=== Film novelizations (1973-1974) ===
Novelized adaptations of Planet of the Apes films written by Jerry Pournelle, David Gerrold and John Jakes.

Title	Author(s)	Date	Catalog / ISBN
Escape From Planet of the Apes	Jerry Pournelle	1973	AN1240
Battle For the Planet of the Apes	David Gerrold	1973	0891901639
Conquest of the Planet of the Apes	John Jakes	1974	AN1241

=== Episode novelizations (1974) ===
Short story adaptations of Planet of the Apes (TV series) episodes written by George Alec Effinger.

Title	Author(s)	Date	Catalog / ISBN
Man the Fugitive	George Alec Effinger	1974	
Escape to Tomorrow	George Alec Effinger	1974	
Journey into Terror	George Alec Effinger	1974	
Lord of the Apes	George Alec Effinger	1974	AN1488

== Ballantine Books (1976) ==
Ballantine Books was the licensed publisher of Return to the Planet of the Apes tie-in fiction.

=== Episode novelizations (1976) ===
Short story adaptations of Return to the Planet of the Apes episodes written by William Arrow.

Title	Author(s)	Date	Catalog / ISBN
Return to the Planet of the Apes #1: Visions From Nowhere	William Arrow	1976	978-0345251220
Return to the Planet of the Apes #2: Escape From Terror Lagoon	William Arrow	1976	978-0345251671
Return to the Planet of the Apes #3: Man, The Hunted Animal	William Arrow	1976	978-0345252111

== HarperCollins (2001-2003) ==
HarperCollins was the licensed publisher of Planet of the Apes reboot film tie-in fiction.

=== HarperCollins Film tie-in novels (2001-2003) ===
Title	Author(s)	Date	Catalog / ISBN
Planet of the Apes: The Novelization	William T. Quick	July 31, 2001	978-0061076350
Planet of the Apes: The Fall	William T. Quick	June 4, 2002	978-0060086206
Planet of the Apes: The Colony	William T. Quick	March 25, 2003	978-0060086213

=== HarperEntertainment Film tie-in novels (2002) ===
Title	Author(s)	Date	Catalog / ISBN
Planet of the Apes: The Novelization	John Whitman	July 31, 2001	978-0060937683
Planet of the Apes: Force	John Whitman	2002	978-0060083731
Planet of the Apes: Resistance	John Whitman	April 2, 2002	9780060083748

== Sources ==
- Greene, Eric (1998). Planet of the Apes as American Myth: Race and Politics in the Films and Television Series. Wesleyan University Press. ISBN 978-0-8195-6329-3.
- Handley, Rich (2008). Timeline of the Planet of the Apes: The Definitive Chronology. Hasslein Books. ISBN 978-0-615-25392-3.
