= Movie 4 =

Television series

Movie 4 (also known as Movie Four) is a television program that aired at various times, but predominantly weekday afternoons, on various television stations on channel 4, including WNBC-TV in New York City from 1956 to 1974. WNBC's program aired top-rank first-run movies and other future classics from Hollywood, as well as foreign films. As with other movie shows of 90-minute length, films that ran longer were often divided into two parts.

Though it achieved a degree of success, for most of its run the WNBC show usually ran in the shadow of rival WCBS-TV's The Early Show on weekdays and The Late Show on weekends. Despite its being a major player among the local movie shows for nearly 18 years, the program today is largely forgotten in relation to WABC-TV's better-known The 4:30 Movie.

The Movie 4 title was also used at varying times until the 1970s by NBC's two other owned-and-operated stations on channel 4, WRC-TV in Washington, D.C. and (to a considerably lesser degree) KNBC in Los Angeles. The network's Chicago outlet, WMAQ-TV, used the title Movie 5 for its movie shows from the late 1950s up to the 1980s; and during NBC's ownership of Philadelphia station WRCV-TV (now KYW-TV), their movie umbrella was known as Movie 3.

== Early history ==
What became Movie 4 debuted on what was then WRCA-TV on June 4, 1956. In its first eight months on the air, the program was known as Evening Theatre, and was hosted by staff announcer Johnny Andrews. Prior to its debut, WRCA-TV had been the least committed to airing old movies among the New York television stations. The show was started in large part as the station's attempt to compete with WCBS-TV's aforementioned movie shows and WOR-TV's Million Dollar Movie, as well as capitalizing on the recent release of major pre- and post-1948 films from the top Hollywood studios for television. Only a month into the show's run, and to show that the station was in the game for keeps, WRCA-TV appointed whom they called a "film director" to oversee the purchase of first-run feature films, and to advise NBC's O&O's and affiliates. The program's title switched to Movie 4 on or about February 3, 1957.

== Peak years ==
The heyday for Movie 4 was in the late 1950s and early 1960s. During this period, many films that became classics had their New York television premieres. Among these films were The Bells of St. Mary's, High Noon, The Quiet Man, The Men, and East of Eden. For the most part, top-line features were usually reserved for the Saturday and Sunday night airings, while more standard fare was run on weekdays and weekend afternoons.

Prestigious foreign films—mainly from England but also from other countries—also had their first showings on Movie 4 over the years. For example, in the autumn of 1960, New York viewers saw the 1955 Peter Sellers–Alec Guinness version of The Ladykillers for the first time on television, as well as Fernandel's The Sheep Has Five Legs, the 1954 Rossano Brazzi film Flesh and Desire, the 1957 French release Les Louves (Demoniac), the 1955 Spanish movie The Miracle of Marcelino, and the 1950 Italian film Prima comunione (Father's Dilemma).

In the program's last years, several films became recurring staples of Movie 4's schedule, including North by Northwest, Home from the Hill, Soldier in the Rain, Captain Newman, M.D., Father Goose, The Time Machine, The Babe Ruth Story, and the respective pilots for Columbo (both Prescription: Murder and Ransom for a Dead Man) and Ironside. Some of Elvis Presley's films also saw play on Movie 4, among them Flaming Star, Kissin' Cousins and It Happened at the World's Fair. The show was also among the first times New Yorkers saw the Doctor Who character, via the theatrical releases Dr. Who and the Daleks and Invasion Earth 2150 A.D. with Peter Cushing as the title character. The station also had its share of Japanese monster movies, including Ghidrah, the Three-Headed Monster and Godzilla vs. the Sea Monster, but such titles were minuscule compared with the number of such films that ran on rival WABC-TV's The 4:30 Movie.

Other films shown on Movie 4 were Visit to a Small Planet, Crawlspace (1972), Lover Come Back (1961), Ten Little Indians (1965), and I'd Rather Be Rich, and such MGM musicals as Annie Get Your Gun, The Band Wagon, Singin' in the Rain, High Society, Kiss Me Kate, and Les Girls.

== Time slots ==
When Evening Theatre began in 1956, it ran Mondays through Fridays from 5:30 to 6:45 pm On January 20, 1957, a few weeks prior to its title change to Movie 4, a Sunday night airing commencing at 10:30 pm was added, as well as a screening on Saturday at 5 pm After another scheduling change, a Saturday night edition starting at 11:15 pm went on the air on April 20, 1957. On June 30, 1958, the weekday airings were rescheduled to the 5:00 to 6:30 pm time slot, which largely held, with notable exceptions, through 1965. (In the 1961–62 season, a five-minute program fronted by Kukla and Ollie pushed Movie 4's starting time to 5:05 pm) By 1961, the weekend movies began on both nights at 11:15 pm (There were also early afternoon weekend films run by WNBC throughout this period, usually under the banner of Movie 4 Matinee.) In 1963, WNBC-TV began offering a late-night weeknight movie program that would come to be called The Great Great Show (a play on the title of WCBS-TV's overnight movie series The Late Late Show, with a logo reminiscent of the TV series The Wild Wild West).

As the years went on, the frequency of Movie 4's airings began to be gradually reduced. In October 1960, the late Saturday afternoon editions were discontinued (they would appear on and off on the weekend afternoon schedule in later years, but such airings were never considered part of the series proper). The program's Sunday night airings ended on September 23, 1962, and was replaced the next week by reruns of Desilu Playhouse. From December 1962 to April 1963, the weekday airings were temporarily cancelled by WNBC due to the 1962 New York City newspaper strike, while special newscasts ran in their place; the strike ultimately led to the creation of a 30-minute newscast, The Pressman–Ryan Report, anchored by Gabe Pressman and Bill Ryan. The Saturday night airings of Movie 4 came to an end on January 2, 1965; the following week, weekend reruns of The Tonight Show took their place. Thereafter, Movie 4 generally aired weekdays only. After WNBC-TV's early-evening local newscast was expanded from 30 minutes to an hour on May 10, 1965, Movie 4 moved to its final time slot of 4:30 to 6 pm, where it remained for the rest of its run.

== Opening and closing themes ==
Movie 4 went through several different opening and closing title segments over the years. One such set, made in 1964 and used to about 1966, has shown up online. They were produced by an animation studio that had done bumpers for WNBC-TV at the time. The opening theme, "Silhouette of a Dream," was composed by Stan Zabka, a former associate director of The Tonight Show Starring Johnny Carson, and the closing theme was an easy listening version of "Petite Fleur (Little Flower)."

== Later years ==
Up to the beginning of 1968, Movie 4 had largely played second fiddle to WCBS's The Early Show. However, in the space of two months in early 1968, came the premiere of what became known as The 4:30 Movie on WABC-TV in January, followed by the cancellation of weekday airings of The Early Show on WCBS-TV and its replacement with The Mike Douglas Show in March. While the series had some up-and-down moments afterwards, these moves eventually consigned Movie 4 to also-ran status, and the show's ratings began to decline. To make matters worse, WNBC-TV's own ratings plunged to last place among the city's network O&O's in the early 1970s, dragging Movie 4 down with it. This was despite a series of promotional advertisements for Movie 4 published in TV Guide and the Daily News with illustrations by Robert Grossman, and later caricatures of individual films' stars by Al Hirschfeld, as run during 1972. In addition, in the show's final years WNBC's inventory of films was becoming alarmingly low, due to their loss of rights to movies that wound up on WCBS-TV, WNEW-TV, WOR-TV and, ironically enough, WABC-TV.

The cancellation of Movie 4 was announced by WNBC-TV on December 12, 1973, as part of its plans for an expanded two-hour newscast that would debut on April 29, 1974 as NewsCenter4. The last Movie 4, a repeat of The Time Machine, was aired on April 26, 1974. The resulting half-hour void left by the cancellation of Movie 4 was filled by reruns of Room 222, whose run on ABC had ended only a few months earlier. Movie 4's demise left WABC-TV as the only network O&O to have an afternoon movie show (The 4:30 Movie, which ran until 1981). The end also preceded by nearly two years the introduction of home videocassette recorders, and by several more years the beginning of the growth of cable television.

== Postscript and aftermath ==
The end of Movie 4 in 1974 effectively brought to a close WNBC-TV's run as a movie showcase. While the station initially retained some of the films that were aired during Movie 4's final years, most of the packages in their library subsequently went to other New York stations, such as 1960s films from Universal Studios that wound up on rival WPIX, which aired several of the titles (including Father Goose and the Columbo and Ironside pilots) as part of its own The Eight O'Clock Movie that ran from December 1974 until the premiere of The WB Television Network in 1995.

As the years went on, the quality of films shown on WNBC-TV became increasingly inferior, with some coming almost exclusively from the public domain. From 1977 or so, the station began using the all-purpose umbrella title Cinema 4 to replace various individual titles that had been in use since the mid-1960s. Cinema 4 ran with decreasing frequency, in its last years confined to occasional weekend airings and overnight weekend showings, until the late 1980s.

== List of theme weeks on Movie 4 ==
=== Actors ===
- Frank Sinatra Week
- Elvis Week
- Rock Hudson Week

=== Individual genres ===
- Women's Lib Week
- Male Animal Week
- Murder Mystery Week
- Love and Marriage Week
- Hollywood Lives Week
- Romance Week
- Flying Week

=== Miscellaneous weeks and months ===
- Abbondanza Month
- Foreign Film Week
- Academy Award Month
- March of Hits Month
- Color Week
- MGM Musicals Week
