= Planet of the Apes (comics) =

Comic book series

Planet of the Apes comics are tie-ins to the Planet of the Apes media franchise. They have been released by several publishers over the years and include tie-ins and spin-offs.

== Publishers ==
=== Japanese comics (manga) ===
There are two manga adaptations of the first film, both entitled Saru no Wakusei (lit. "Planet of Monkeys"). The first was written and drawn by Jôji Enami and published in the manga magazine Bessatsu Bôken'Ô in April 1968. The second was drawn by Minoru Kuroda and published in the manga Tengoku Zôkan in June 1971. Battle for the Planet of the Apes (最後の猿の惑星 - Saigo no Saru no Wakusei, "Battle on the Planet of Monkeys", in Japanese) was also adapted into a manga by Mitsuru Sugaya, and published in a 1973 special issue of the magazine Weekly Shōnen Champion.

=== Gold Key Comics ===
Gold Key Comics produced an adaptation of Beneath the Planet of the Apes the second film in 1970. That was the first Western comics publication in the Planet of the Apes franchise.

=== Marvel Comics ===
Marvel Comics released a number of titles, the longest-lived being Planet of the Apes (published under the Marvel imprint Curtis Magazines), which appeared in black-and-white magazine format, and ran for twenty-nine issues from 1974 to 1977. Besides adaptations of all five movies, the magazine featured original stories set in the same universe of the movie, with writing from Doug Moench and Gerry Conway and art from Mike Esposito, Mike Ploog, George Tuska, and others. Articles about the making of both the movie series and the later Planet of the Apes television series were also a mainstay.

In 1975, Adventures on the Planet of the Apes offered color versions of the adaptations of the first two films in comic form in five- or six-issue arcs, for total of 11 issues. It was written by Doug Moench.

The stories from the U.S. magazine were edited and released by Marvel UK in a weekly title of the same name, lasting 123 issues from 1974 to 1977. This included adapted reprints of the Killraven comic, renamed as Apeslayer and with alien apes as enemies. The British title changed names to Planet of the Apes and Dracula Lives, before merging into The Mighty World of Marvel #231-246, where the title spot on the cover was shared between Planet of the Apes and The Incredible Hulk—also being stories from the U.S. runs.

In 2022, Marvel announced that they had reacquired the comics license to Planet of the Apes and it will release the new comics in 2023, following a reprint of the company's heavily edited 1970s comic Adventures on the Planet of the Apes. The new series was initially written by David Walker with art by Dave Wachter, and set in the universe of the reboot film series, but without specific characters from it.

In 2024, Marc Guggenheim and Alvaro Lopez conceived the next comic book series titled Beware the Planet of the Apes which is a prequel to the 1960s franchise and feature Cornelius, Zira, and the woman that will later be named Nova. Issue #2 reveals that the gibbons are the servant class of the ape community.

=== Power Records ===
In 1975, Power Records made adaptations of four of the films which were included with book-and-record sets, and appeared in LP format as well, as an audio only compilation album featuring all four adaptations. The only film in the original series that did not receive an adaptation is Conquest of the Planet of the Apes.

The company also produced an audio-only series on LP that featured the main characters of the television series—Virdon, Burke and Galen—in original stories.

=== Chad Valley ===
In 1975, Chad Valley, a U.K. toy company, produced 32 short film-based comic strips containing illustrated scenes from various TV series episodes, packaged as part of the slideshow projector playset, named respectively Chad Valley Picture Show: Planet of the Apes Sliderama Projector These strips are extremely rare and difficult to come by, and contain many continuity errors.

=== Brown Watson Books ===
Between 1975 and 1977, Brown Watson Books published a trio of UK-published hardcover comic annuals based on the spin-off 1974 television series.

=== Editorial Mo.Pa.Sa. ===
Editorial Mo.Pa.Sa., an Argentine company, published seven Spanish-language Apes comics in the 1970s, featuring original tales about the television series' characters. It was written by Jorge Claudio Morhain, and Ricardo Barreiro, with art by Sergio Mulko and T. Toledo. Five additional issues were planned, but were never produced. To date, the Spanish stories have never been published in English, but translations have been made available on fan sites.

=== Hungarian comic ===
In 1981, a Hungarian company published a comic adaptation of Pierre Boulle's original novel, titled A Majmok bolygója (lit. "The Monkey Planet"). This adaptation was written and drawn by Hungarian comic artist Ernő Zórád. To date, the Hungarian comic has never been published in English, but a translation has been made available on fan sites.

=== Malibu Publishing/Adventure Comics ===
Between 1990 and 1993, Adventure Comics, a division of Malibu Publishing, produced more original storylines, set after the time of Caesar. These included a 24-issue monthly title, a one-shot (Sins of the Father), a Planet of the Apes annual and five original mini-series: Urchak's Folly, Forbidden Zone, Ape City, Blood of the Apes and a crossover with Alien Nation called Ape Nation. Adventure also reprinted Marvel's adaptations of the first three films as well as a four-issue mini-series featuring installments from Marvel's Terror on the Planet of the Apes saga.

=== Filipino parody ===
Debuting in 1978, a long-running Filipino parody adaptation called Planet op di Eyps was serialized in Pilipino FUNNY Komiks.

=== Dark Horse Comics ===
American company Dark Horse published a series written by Ian Edginton, tie-in with Tim Burton's 2001 Apes film. Between 2001 and 2002, Dark Horse published a film adaptation, a mini-series, a brief ongoing run, a Toys R' Us minicomic and a three-part serial in Dark Horse Extra.

=== Mr. Comics ===
Mr. Comics had the license until 2005 and released a six-issue mini-series, Revolution on the Planet of the Apes, by Joe O'Brien, Ty Templeton Sam Agro, and other writers, with art by Gabriel Morrissette and additional artists. The story picked up shortly after Caesar's conquest of the Earth after the apes' revolt and attempted to bridge the time gap before Battle for the Planet of the Apes (1973). Further stories were slated for release, including the next planned title, Empire on the Planet of the Apes, but the graphic novel collecting the Revolution mini-series was canceled, as was the Empire follow-up.

=== Boom! Studios ===
==== Classic continuity ====
Boom!'s Planet of the Apes series of comics is the longest-running adaptation of the series, publishing more comics than Marvel (29 issues) and Malibu (50 issues). Beginning April 2011, Boom! Studios launched a new series written by novelist Daryl Gregory, illustrated by Carlos Magno and edited by Ian Brill, with covers by Karl Richardson and Chad Hardin that took place 500 years before the original 1968 Planet of the Apes movie in the continuity of the first five films. It ran for a total of 16 issues, ending in August 2012. The storyline was continued in Planet of the Apes Annual #1 (August, 2012), then furthered in Planet of the Apes Special #1 (April 2013), then furthered again in Planet of the Apes Spectacular #1 (July 2013) and finally wrapped up in Planet of the Apes Giant #1 (September, 2013). His entire run was collected in Planet of the Apes Omnibus (2018).

In late 2011, Boom! also began publishing the four-issue mini-series Betrayal of the Planet of the Apes. This mini-series is set 20 years before the events of the original film, and features different characters, like Dr. Zaius, than the concurrent ongoing series. This was followed up in early 2012 by another mini-series, Exile on the Planet of the Apes, set two years later. Beginning in September 2012, Planet of the Apes: Cataclysm took over as Boom!'s regular monthly series. Set eight years prior to the original Planet of the Apes, this series was written by Corinna Sara Bechko and Gabriel Hardman, authors of both the Betrayal and Exile miniseries, and mixed several characters from those series with characters from the original movie. This entire run was collected in Planet of the Apes: Before the Fall Omnibus (2019).

Boom! and IDW Publishing published a crossover between Planet of the Apes and Star Trek: The Original Series, titled Star Trek/Planet of the Apes: The Primate Directive. The first issue was published in December 2014. In 2016, Boom! started a miniseries crossover between Planet of the Apes and Tarzan, titled Tarzan on the Planet of the Apes. In February 2017, Boom! and DC Comics published a 6 issue crossover called Planet of the Apes/Green Lantern. It was set soon after the events of the first film. This was also the setting for a crossover with King Kong in Kong on the Planet of the Apes.

In August 2018, Boom! published a one-shot comic titled Planet of the Apes: Visionaries, which is a comic book based on the Rod Serling script for the original 1968 Planet of the Apes movie.

A self-titled six-issue mini-series by David Walker looked at the early years of Ursus, starting in January 2018. The one-shots The Time of Man and The Simian Age drew together stories from different continuities in the same year.

==== Reboot continuity ====
Just before the release of the feature film Rise of the Planet of the Apes Boom! serialized 6 installments of five-page webcomics that served as a prelude to the movie. The stories featured Alpha and Bright Eyes, Caesar's parents, and detailed their capture in the wild and the time they spent in the Gen-Sys Laboratories. At San Diego Comic-Con in 2014, Boom! published a one-shot stand-alone print comic book, called Dawn of the Planet of the Apes: Contagion bridging Rise of the Planet of the Apes and Dawn of the Planet of the Apes. In December 2014, Boom! started the six-issue series Dawn of the Planet of the Apes, set in the movie continuity of the second reboot film. A four-issue 2017 War for the Planet of the Apes series served as a prequel to the movie of the same name. All these reboot continuity comics were collected in Planet of the Apes: After the Fall Omnibus (2019).

== List ==
The following is a default list of all Planet of the Apes comic book titles.

=== Ongoing series ===
Title	Publisher	Issues	Dates	Notes
Planet of the Apes	Marvel	#1–29	1974–1977	
Planet of the Apes	Marvel UK	#1–123	1974–1977	
Adventures on the Planet of the Apes	Marvel	#1–11	1975	Adaptations of the first two films
Planet of the Apes	Adventure	#1–24	1990–1992	
Planet of the Apes	Dark Horse	#1–6	2001–2002	Continuation of The Human War, set before the 2001 film
Planet of the Apes	Boom! Studios	#1–16	2011–2012	

=== Limited series ===
Title	Publisher	Issues	Dates	Notes
Ape City	Adventure	#1–4	1990	
Planet of the Apes: Urchak's Folly	Adventure	#1–4	1991	
Terror on the Planet of the Apes	Adventure	#1–4	1991	
Ape Nation	Adventure	#1–4	1991	Crossover with Alien Nation
Planet of the Apes: Blood of the Apes	Adventure	#1–4	1991–1992	
Planet of the Apes: The Forbidden Zone	Adventure	#1–4	1992–1993	
Planet of the Apes: The Human War	Dark Horse	#1–3	2001–2002	Prequel to the 2001 film
Revolution on the Planet of the Apes	Mr. Comics	#1–6	2005–2006	Set immediately after Conquest of the Planet of the Apes
Betrayal of the Planet of the Apes	Boom! Studios	#1–4	2011–2012	Prequel to the original film
Exile on the Planet of the Apes	Boom! Studios	#1–4	2012	Prequel to the original film and sequel to Betrayal
Planet of the Apes: Cataclysm	Boom! Studios	#1–12	2012	Prequel to the original film and sequel to Betrayal and Exile
Dawn of the Planet of the Apes	Boom! Studios	#1–6	2014	Set before Dawn of the Planet of the Apes
Star Trek/Planet of the Apes: The Primate Directive	Boom! Studios/IDW	#1–5	2016–2017	Crossover with Star Trek: The Original Series
Tarzan on the Planet of the Apes	Boom! Studios/Dark Horse	#1–5	2016–2017	Alternate timeline to Beneath the Planet of the Apes
Planet of the Apes/Green Lantern	Boom! Studios/DC	#1–6	2016–2017	Crossover with DC's Green Lantern
War for the Planet of the Apes	Boom! Studios	#1–4	2017	Set before War for the Planet of the Apes
Kong on the Planet of the Apes	Boom! Studios	#1–6	2017–2018	Crossover with King Kong
Planet of the Apes: Ursus	Boom! Studios	#1–6	2018	Prequel to the original film
Planet of the Apes	Marvel	#1–5	2023	
Beware the Planet of the Apes	Marvel	#1–4	2024	Prequel to the original film
Planet of the Apes versus Fantastic Four	Marvel	#1–4	2026	Crossover with Marvel's Fantastic Four
Predator versus Planet of the Apes	Marvel	#1–5	2026	Crossover with Predator

=== One-shots ===
Title	Publisher	Issues	Dates	Notes
Beneath the Planet of the Apes	Gold Key	nn	1970	Standalone adaptation of the second film
Planet of the Apes Annual	Adventure	#1	1991	
Planet of the Apes: Sins of the Father	Adventure	#1	1992	
Planet of the Apes Movie Special	Dark Horse	nn	2001	Adaptation of the 2001 film
Planet of the Apes Annual	Boom! Studios	#1	2012	
Planet of the Apes Special	Boom! Studios	#1	2013	
Planet of the Apes Spectacular	Boom! Studios	#1	2013	
Dawn of the Planet of the Apes: Contagion	Boom! Studios	nn	2014	Set between Rise and Dawn
Planet of the Apes Giant	Boom! Studios	#1	2018	
Planet of the Apes: Time of Man	Boom! Studios	#1	2018	
Planet of the Apes: The Simian Age	Boom! Studios	#1	2018	
Planet of the Apes: Visionaries	Boom! Studios	nn	2018	Adaptation of the original screenplay by Rod Serling

== Compilations ==
Some of the comics have been collected together as trade paperbacks:

- Planet of the Apes (written by Ian Edginton, for Dark Horse):
  - Human Wars (penciles by Paco Medina, Adrian Sibar; inks by Juan Vlasco, Norman Lee, Christopher Ivy, 2001)
  - The Ongoing Saga Volume 1: Old Gods (pencils by Adrian Sibar, Paco Medina; inks by Norman Lee, Juan Vlasco, 2001–2002, Titan Books ISBN 1-84023-429-6)
  - The Ongoing Saga Volume 2: Blood Lines (co-written by Dan Abnett; pencils by Sanford Greene, Pop Mhan, Paco Medina, Adrian Sibar; inks by Norman Lee, Pop Mhan, Juan Vlasco, 2001–2002)

In addition, Adventure Comics released trade-paperback compilations of Marvel's adaptations of the first three films, as well as a collection of its own first four monthly issues, entitled Monkey Planet.

== See also ==
- List of comics based on fiction
- List of comics based on films
