= The 4:30 Movie =

American television series

The 4:30 Movie is a television program that aired weekday afternoons on WABC-TV (Channel 7) in New York from 1968 to 1981. The program was mainly known for individual theme weeks of theatrical feature films or made-for-TV movies starring a certain actor or actress, to a particular genre, or to films that spawned sequels. The more popular episodes were "Monster Week," "Planet of the Apes Week" and "Vincent Price Week." Some films, such as Ben-Hur and How the West Was Won, were of such length that an entire week was devoted to running the whole movie. Other films that ran longer than the program's 90-minute length were divided into two parts and shown over two days.

Often, The 4:30 Movie would rebroadcast installments of the ABC Movie of the Week.

Variations of The 4:30 Movie aired on other stations around the United States, most notably those also owned and operated by WABC-TV's parent network, ABC.

== History ==
The 4:30 Movie got its start on January 8, 1968. In its first year in that time slot, it was broadcast under The Big Show. This earlier title dated back to September 16, 1963, when WABC first aired movies in late afternoons to compete with WCBS-TV's long-running The Early Show and WNBC-TV's Movie Four. The movies were shown at 5:00 until December 31, 1965, and at 6:00 from January 3, 1966, to January 5, 1968. (From the autumn of 1966 to the 1968 time change, it was titled The 6 O'Clock Movie, a title which was also used by sister stations KABC-TV in Los Angeles and KGO-TV in San Francisco until 1971.)

In its first twenty months in its soon-to-be titular time slot, The Big Show / 4:30 Movie was two hours, but after the early evening Eyewitness News was expanded from 30 minutes to an hour on September 8, 1969, the movie show's length was set at 90 minutes, which it would remain for the rest of its run. After the autumn of 1972, the program was preempted once a month on Wednesday in the school months to run an episode of the ABC Afterschool Special.

The announcer and off-camera host for The Big Show, and The 4:30 Movie was Scott Vincent from January 1968 to December 1978. At Vincent's request, Gilbert Hodges assumed his duties during the former's illness in 1979. Following Vincent's death, announcing on promos was divided among Hodges, Fred Foy, Joel Crager and Ernie Anderson. The copy for The 4:30 Movie's openings, bumpers, and promos was written by Jon Kal.

The instrumental used as the theme music to The 4:30 Movie was an original composition, "Big Show Theme," composed by Walter Raim, written and originally recorded in the waning months of WABC's using The Big Show title. The piece was commissioned by ABC in 1968 for use on flagship station WABC-TV and was later applied to the local movie shows of the network's O&Os.

The first opening title sequence associated with The 4:30 Movie was a motif of a film crew setting up studio lights and adjusting a movie camera, and ending with a director sitting in a chair and holding a bullhorn before the title zoomed in; this was used from 1969 until circa 1973. The most famous image associated with the show's opening, a silhouetted image of a "rotating cameraman" operating a 35 mm movie camera, was animated by Harry Marks and used on WABC-TV from around 1973 to 1980. This opening was also applied to the station's other movie shows, and was used for their Saturday Night Movie and Sunday Night Movie as late as 1987, with the theme music still in use up to 1991. The "rotating cameraman" footage originated from the opening titles for the weekend edition of the ABC Movie of the Week in 1971 . From 1980 to the end, The 4:30 Movie's opening titles were similar to what was used for The ABC Sunday Night Movie and The ABC Friday Night Movie in the late 1970s, except with different theme music ("Skippin' " by Ramsey Lewis, from his 1977 album Tequila Mockingbird).

The 4:30 Movie was cancelled by WABC-TV in November 1981, and was replaced effective November 30 by The People's Court and a 5:00 edition of Eyewitness News. As with many once-popular movie shows on both the networks and local television stations, the factors most commonly cited in The 4:30 Movie's demise ranged from the proliferation of cable television channels such as HBO, Cinemax and Showtime, to the increasing popularity of videocassette recorders.

== Equivalents in other cities ==
=== Chicago ===
On WLS-TV, formerly WBKB-TV this show was called The 3:30 Movie, which was a nearly identical show, except for the title. The station ran movies in that time slot under the title of The Big Show as early as 1962, and first assumed The 3:30 Movie title in September 1968. From July 21, 1980, until its final airing on July 26, 1984, it would air a half-hour earlier as The 3:00 Movie.

=== Los Angeles ===
KABC-TV's weekday movie show debuted on August 31, 1964, at 6 PM. For most of its time at that slot, the umbrella was called The 6 O'Clock Movie, remaining there until September 10, 1971. On September 13, 1971, it moved a half-hour later as The Six-Thirty Movie (also known as The 6:30 Movie), lasting at that time slot through March 29, 1974, and after April 1, 1974, it was known as The 3:30 Movie. The program aired for the last time on September 12, 1980; effective September 15, KABC added a 4:00 edition of Eyewitness News, anchored by Jerry Dunphy and Tawny Little.

=== Detroit ===
WXYZ-TV's afternoon movie show, like WABC's, was known for years as The 4:30 Movie; it debuted on May 20, 1968, when the 6PM movie and the 4:30PM newscast switched places. Beginning September 20, 1976, it had moved ahead a half-hour and was retitled The 4:00 Movie. The program lasted until October 22, 1982, after which it was replaced by the ultimately short-lived Good Afternoon Detroit. ,

=== San Francisco ===
On KGO-TV, the equivalent was The 6 O'Clock Movie up to 1971, and then The Six-Thirty Movie through 1974; thereafter, following a change in time slot, it became The 3:30 Movie. The program was cancelled in 1986 to make room for Oprah at 3:00 p.m. and Donahue at 4:00 p.m.

In virtually all the above cases, these movie umbrellas originally went by the same title of The Big Show as WABC, with KGO's movie show running as early as 1962. The programs changed to the later titles around the same time as the New York station.

From 1982 to 1983, WOR-TV in New York ran a late afternoon movie program called The 4:30 Movie, but it bore no relation to WABC's movie umbrella. This was also the case for sister station KHJ's The 3:30 Movie in the Los Angeles market.

== List of The 4:30 Movie's theme weeks ==
=== Actors and actresses ===
- Vincent Price Week
- Elvis Presley Week (sometimes The Beatles and Elvis Presley Week, including A Hard Day's Night and Help! surrounded and separated by three Elvis films)
- John Wayne Week
- Raquel Welch Week
- Ann-Margret Week
- Martin & Lewis Week
- Dean Martin Week
- Jerry Lewis Week
- Bob Hope Week
- Marilyn Monroe Week
- Sidney Poitier Week
- Anthony Quinn Week
- Susan Hayward Week
- Troy Donahue Week
- Frank Sinatra Week
- Burt Lancaster Week
- James Stewart Week
- Tony Curtis Week
- Steve McQueen Week (including The Great Escape shown over three days, with a half hour from the end of part one and the beginning of part three included in the second part)
- Doris Day Week
- Tony Randall Week
- Paul Newman Week
- Bing Crosby Week
- Cary Grant Week
- Fonda Week, with Henry and Jane Fonda
- Natalie Wood Week
- Charlton Heston Week
- Burt Reynolds Week
- Jack Lemmon Week
- Robert Mitchum Week
- Elizabeth Taylor Week
- Richard Burton Week
- William Holden Week

=== Continuing movie series ===
- Gidget Week
- Lassie Week
- Matt Helm Week
- Our Man Flint Week
- Planet of the Apes Week with the first film in the series divided over two days, with about a half hour shown at the end of part one repeated at the start of part two

=== Movie genres ===
- Monster Week
- Beach Party Week
- Fantasy Week
- Western Week
- Epic Week
- Adventure Week
- Laugh-a-Thon Week
- Sci-Fi Week
- Skeleton Week
- Strange Worlds Week
- Secret Agent Week
- Swinger Week
- Supernatural Week
- A Fistful of Heroes Week
- International Women's Week
- Suspense Week
- Bad Girls Week
- Presidential Week
- Romance Week
- Caper Week
- War Week
- Love and Marriage Week
- Edgar Allan Poe Week

=== Individual movies airing the whole week ===
- Ben-Hur Week
- How the West Was Won Week
- QB VII Week
- Bridge on the River Kwai Week

On occasion, The 4:30 Movie repeated some miniseries that originally aired nationally on ABC a few years before, most notably Roots, as well as Rich Man, Poor Man and its sequel. The length of each of these films was such that two whole weeks were dedicated to running the entire movie, rather than just one week.
