= Planet of the Apes (TV series) =

1974 American sci-fi television series

- DVD cover art
- Created by: Pierre Boulle
- Based on: Characters by Pierre Boulle
- Developed by: Anthony Wilson
- Starring: Roddy McDowall; Ron Harper; James Naughton; Mark Lenard; Booth Colman
- Composers: Lalo Schifrin; Earle Hagen; Richard LaSalle
- Country of origin: United States
- No. of episodes: 14

Production
- Executive producer: Herbert Hirschman
- Producer: Stan Hough
- Running time: 50 minutes
- Production company: 20th Century Fox Television

Original release
- Network: CBS
- Release: September 13 – December 20, 1974

Planet of the Apes is an American science fiction television series that was broadcast on CBS from September 13 to December 20, 1974. The series features Roddy McDowall, Ron Harper, James Naughton, and Mark Lenard. It is based on the 1968 film of the same name and its sequels, which were, in turn, based on the 1963 novel Planet of the Apes by Pierre Boulle.

== Overview ==
The series begins with the crash of an Earth spaceship that encountered a time warp while approaching Alpha Centauri on August 19, 1980. The spaceship is crewed by three astronauts, one of whom has died in the crash. The other two astronauts, Colonel Alan Virdon and Major Peter J. Burke, are unconscious but are rescued by an old man who carries them to an old bomb shelter. After the old man opens a book containing historical text and pictures of Earth circa 2500, the two astronauts are convinced that they are indeed on a future Earth.

The crash is also witnessed by a young chimpanzee who tells his father, a village official who alerts the authorities. Ape councilor Zaius (an analog of the character from the original movie), notes that another such incident occurred ten years earlier. He orders the chief gorilla, Security Chief Urko, to find the humans and bring them back alive. Zaius wants to find out as much as he can about the humans before they are eventually killed. Zaius doesn't trust Urko to follow his orders and bring back any surviving humans, so he sends along his newly hired chimpanzee assistant, Galen.

Both Virdon and Burke go back to their ship to check the ship's chronometer. They are more than 1000 years in the future from when they left Earth. Virdon insists on retrieving the ship's flight log in the hopes that they will be able to analyze it and be able to return to their own time period, but while they are at the ship, they are captured, and the old man is subsequently killed by a group of apes.

Galen finds the human book that the old man had been carrying. He reads parts of the book and begins to doubt the history that he has been told: apes have always been dominant, and humans have always been inferior and subservient. When Galen finds out that Urko has arranged for the two astronauts to escape and be killed in the attempt, he stops the shooter and helps the humans escape. During the escape, a guard is killed, and Galen is found standing over him with a gun in his hand.

Galen discusses the book that he found with Zaius, who then accuses him of heresy. Galen is sentenced to death for his crime. Then Virdon and Burke find out about his sentence and rescue Galen. They are all then declared enemies of the state and become fugitives. The three fugitives thereafter wander around the territory that used to be the western United States having various encounters with apes, humans, and old human civilization ruins.

== Cast ==
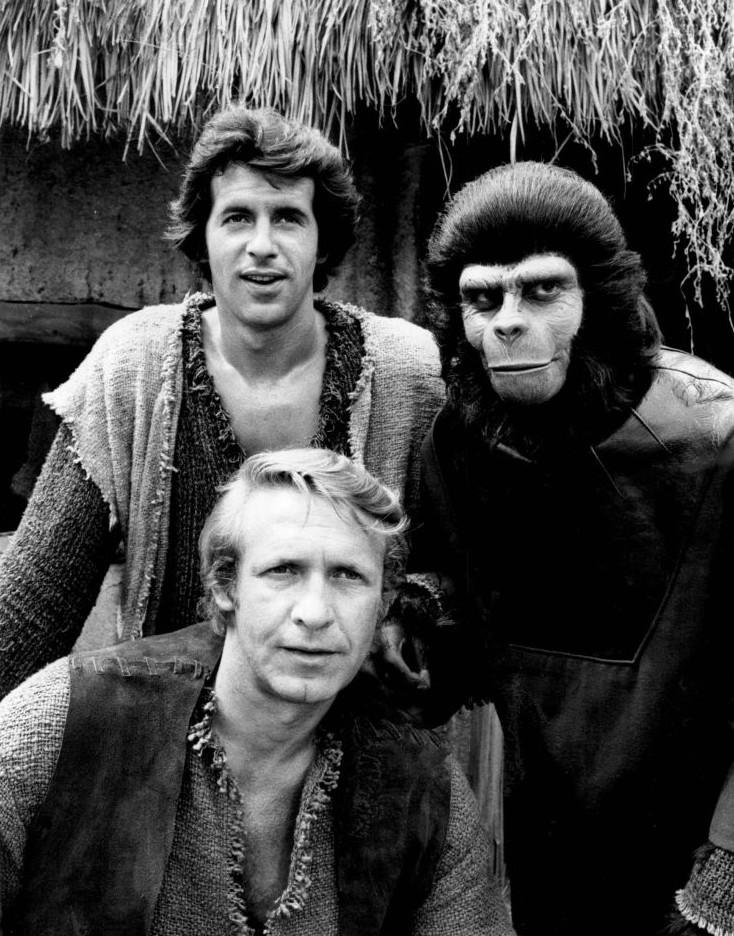
Back row: James Naughton and Roddy McDowall; front: Ron Harper (1974).

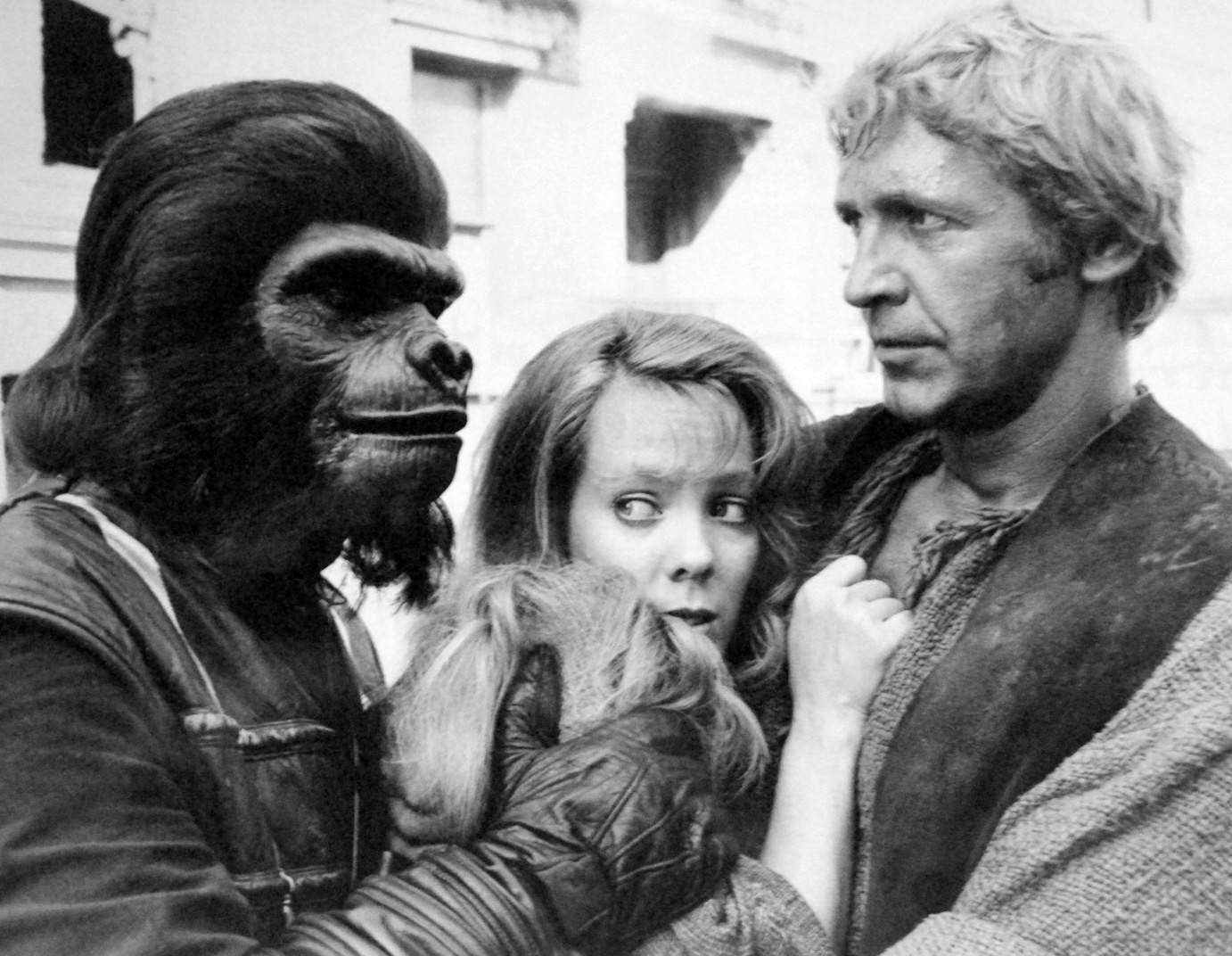
L-R: Wayne Foster, Zina Bethune and Ron Harper.

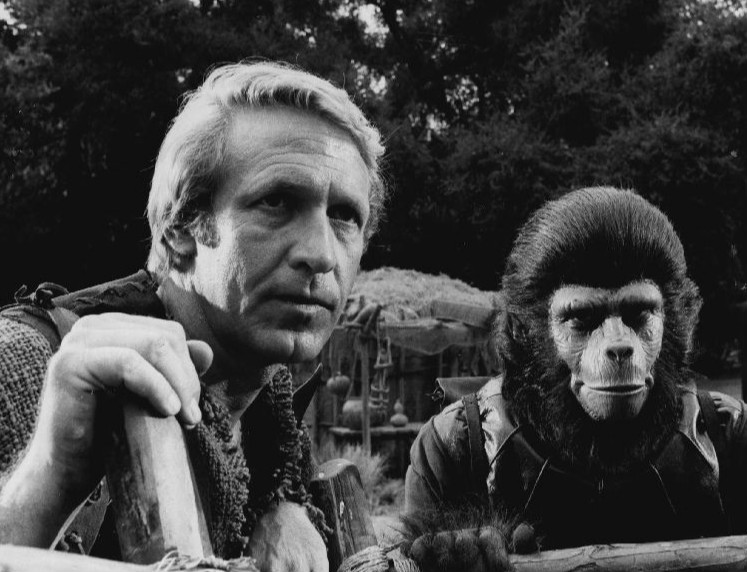
Ron Harper and Roddy McDowall.

- Roddy McDowall as Galen, a young chimpanzee that is sent by Zaius with Urko to ensure the safety of two humans that have survived a crash landing on Earth. McDowall previously played Cornelius and Caesar throughout the various movie versions.
- Ron Harper as Colonel Alan Virdon, the human commander of the crash-landed ANSA spaceship from 20th Century Earth.
- James Naughton as Major Peter J. Burke, a human astronaut that also survived the crash.
- Mark Lenard as Security Chief Urko, a violent gorilla and the series' main antagonist.
- Booth Colman as Councillor Zaius, the highest-ranking member of the High Council of Central City in the year 3085.
- John Hoyt as Barlow, a chimpanzee prefect of Kaymak who had introduced gladiatorial fights between the humans in "The Gladiators", and whose horse later competes against Urko's in "The Horse Race".
- Jacqueline Scott, as a chimpanzee farmer's daughter Zantes in "The Good Seeds", and as Kira, Galen's chimpanzee ex-fiancée and surgeon, in "The Surgeon".

== Episodes ==
No.	Title	Directed by	Written by	Original release date	Prod. code
1	"Escape from Tomorrow"	Don Weis	Art Wallace	September 13, 1974	B-503
This episode tells the story of the two astronauts, Burke and Virdon, crash, the rescue and subsequent capture of two of them, and their escape with Galen. Guest Starring Royal Dano as Farrow and Woodrow Parfrey as Veska.
2	"The Gladiators"	Don McDougall	Art Wallace	September 20, 1974	B-502
A human kills General Urko's Lieutenant, Jason (Pat Renella). Urko believes Prefect Barlow to be responsible for Jason's death and transfers him to the remote outpost of Venton. Shortly afterwords, Burke and Virdon are faced with having to fight to the death when they wander by Venton where they are captured, and Prefect Barlow amuses himself by staging gladiator-style fights between the humans in his charge. Guest starring William Smith as Tolar, John Hoyt as Barlow, and Marc Singer as Dalton.
3	"The Trap"	Arnold Laven	Edward J. Lakso	September 27, 1974	B-505
When they are trapped together underground in an abandoned Bay Area Rapid Transit subway station in San Francisco following an earthquake, Burke and General Urko are forced to work together to try to survive. Above ground, Galen and Virdon try to figure out a way to help Burke, with the assistance of several gorilla soldiers despite their mutual distrust. Guest starring Norm Alden as Zako and John Milford as Miller.
4	"The Good Seeds"	Don Weis	Robert W. Lenski	October 4, 1974	B-501
When Galen injures his leg and cannot travel, Burke and Virdon seek refuge at a farm until Galen can heal. The farm is operated by a gruff but decent ape named Polar, with his wife Zantes and their three children; eldest son Anto (Geoffrey Deuel), younger son Remus (Bobby Porter) and daughter Jillia (Eileen Dietz Elber). The farm is "four days' hard ride" from Center City. The three travelers spend two weeks here so that Galen's leg can mend. While they are there, Virdon, who grew up on a farm, helps Polar improve crop yields, builds a windmill to pump water from under the ground, introduces the family to such things as butter, and helps deliver a calf. Polar soon accepts these changes but Anto resents the strangers, fearing they will hex a cow about to give birth. (Until the cow delivers a bull calf, Anto can't start a farm of his own.) When Virdon helps deliver not one but two bull calves, Anto is won over and names the calves Virdon and Burke. Guest starring Geoffrey Deuel as Anto, Lonny Chapman as Polar, and Jacqueline Scott as Zantes.
5	"The Legacy"	Bernard McEveety	Robert Hamner	October 11, 1974	B-504
While exploring the ruins of Oakland, California, Virdon and Burke find a filmed message from scientists from an earlier time which may help them discover what happened to their civilization. Guest starring Zina Bethune as Arn, Jackie Earle Haley as Kraik, and Robert Philliips as Gorilla Captain.
6	"Tomorrow's Tide"	Don McDougall	Robert W. Lenski	October 18, 1974	B-508
While walking along a beach, Virdon and Burke are captured by an ape patrol and taken to a small fishing village that employs human slave labor. Hurton, the ape leader of the village, administers a fishing operation and he presses Virdon and Burke into service as fishermen after they pass a test by swimming under a sheet of flames. Trouble arises when Hurton's superior, Bandor, comes on an inspection tour. Virdon and Burke must prove their worth as fishermen or be sacrificed to the gods of the sea - the sharks. Guest starring Roscoe Lee Browne as Hurton and Jay Robinson as Bandor.
7	"The Surgeon"	Arnold Laven	Barry Oringer	October 25, 1974	B-509
Virdon is shot and seriously wounded by a gorilla patrol. Galen and Burke take him to a medical center just outside Center City. Galen risks his freedom and his life by contacting his old sweetheart, Kira for help. Kira is now a talented, and forward thinking, chimpanzee surgeon; and Galen shares with her a forbidden book on human anatomy, that he and Burke stole from Dr. Zaius' home earlier, with her. Kira reluctantly agrees to help where Virdon must undergo an operation involving a blood transfusion, a procedure ape doctors believe to be impossible. Guest starring Jacqueline Scott as Kira and Michael Strong as Travin, and Martin Brooks as Leander. Special Guest: Jamie Smith Jackson as Girl.
8	"The Deception"	Don McDougall	T : Anthony Lawrence & Ken Spears & Joe Ruby; S/T : Anthony Lawrence	November 1, 1974	B-510
Galen, Virdon and Burke befriend a chimpanzee named Fauna, the blind daughter of a human-friendly ape who was just killed by a band of vigilante apes known as the Dragoons. Unaware that Burke is human, Fauna falls in love with him. At the same time, Galen and Virdon hunt down the Dragoons, only to discover that Fauna's uncle is one of them. Guest starring Jane Actman as Fauna, Pat Renella as Zon, and John Milford as Sestus.
9	"The Horse Race"	Jack Starrett	David P. Lewis & Booker Bradshaw	November 8, 1974	B-511
In exchange for a condemned human's freedom, Virdon agrees to race a Prefect Barlow's horse against Urko's - who has never lost a race. Guest starring Morgan Woodward as Martin, John Hoyt as Barlow, and Richard Devon as Zandar.
10	"The Interrogation"	Alf Kjellin	Richard Collins	November 15, 1974	B-512
Burke is captured by gorilla soldiers and taken to Central City, where he is interrogated by a female ape using an old book on brainwashing techniques. Meanwhile, Urko goes on an inspection tour of the outer provinces. Guest starring Beverly Garland as Wanda, Anne Seymour as Ann, and Normann Burton as Yalu.
11	"The Tyrant"	Ralph Senensky	Walter Black	November 22, 1974	B-513
The three fugitives risk an encounter with Urko when they attempt to foil the plans of a tyrannical ape who is using bribery to gain total control over a district of human farmers. Urko and Burke are forced to work together again to stop the tyrannical gorilla. Guest starring Percy Rodrigues as Aboro, Michael Conrad as Janor, and Joseph Ruskin as Daku.
12	"The Cure"	Bernard McEveety	Edward J. Lakso	November 29, 1974	B-506
The three travelers assist when a malaria outbreak devastates a village. The prefect distrusts Virdon's insistence that mosquitoes from the nearby swamp spread the disease and that a preparation from tree bark (quinine) may cure it, but he is under pressure from Zaius to get results or Urko will be permitted to raze the village with everyone in it. Guest starring Sondra Locke as Amy, David Sheiner as Zoran, Ron Soble as Kava, and George Wallace as Talbert.
13	"The Liberator"	Arnold Laven	Howard Dimsdale	December 6, 1974	B-507
Burke, Galen and Virdon are captured by a village of semi-autonomous humans who are forced quarterly to furnish five human slaves to their ape overlords to work in the mines. The chief of the town sacrifices unwilling humans to their god in a temple during a cult type ceremony. This temple turns out to be an ancient ruin where a poisonous invisible gas is located (likely phosgene or diphosgene circa WWI Germany). Later, the chief (wearing a costumed gas mask) is discovered to be building an arsenal of gas bombs and a distillery to produce poisonous gas ceramic containers. He claims the moral right to use these weapons to rid the world of the ape threat. Guest starring John Ireland as Brun and Ben Andrews as Miro. (This controversial episode involved the creation of poisonous gas as a weapon of mass destruction. During the time of the Vietnam War protests, the Agent Orange controversy, the Yom Kippur War, the 1973 Chilean coup d'état, and the enactment of the War Powers Resolution by US Congress, CBS likely decided not to broadcast this episode during a holiday season with by such domestic and international conflicts.) Note: Several sources including the Fox DVD release and the book Timeline of the Planet of the Apes by Rich Handley list "The Liberator" as an unbroadcast episode. The Timeline book also states that it wasn't broadcast in the United States until the early 1990s on the Sci-Fi Channel. However, it is listed as having been broadcast on December 6, 1974 in the books Planet of the Apes Revisited by Joe Russo, Larry Landsman and Edward Gross, and Planet of the Apes as American Myth by Eric Greene.
14	"Up Above the World So High"	John Meredyth Lucas	T : Arthur Browne, Jr. S/T : S. Bar-David	December 20, 1974	B-514
Virdon, Burke and Galen are near the sea foraging when they encounter a human, named Leuric, who is experimenting with flight in a hang-glider he has built himself. But when Leuric is captured by gorilla soldiers, a female chimpanzee scientist, named Carisa, tries to persuade Zaius and Urko to replicate the glider for her own deadly purpose. It is up to Virdon, Burke and Galen to free Leuric before the apes learn his technology to fly. Guest starring Joanna Barnes as Carsia, Frank Aletter as Leuric, and Martin Brooks as Konag. Note: TV Guide listings from December 6, 1974 have it scheduled to be broadcast on that date. However, the FOX DVD release and the Timeline book list "Up Above the World So High" as having been broadcast on December 20, 1974, as do the books Planet of the Apes Revisited and Planet of the Apes as American Myth.

== Production ==
Discussions for a Planet of the Apes television series were made by producer Arthur P. Jacobs as early as 1971. Because of the success of the movies, the idea of a television series was delayed until after the completion of Battle for the Planet of the Apes during the first half of 1973. However, soon after the premiere of Battle, Jacobs died, and his production company APJAC Productions sold all Planet of the Apes rights and privileges to 20th Century Fox. Subsequently, television rights for the first three Planet of the Apes movies were sold to CBS and broadcast successfully during September 1973. Based largely on high viewership of "movie-of-the-week" television broadcasts of the first few movies, CBS began to disfavor other contenders for a new science-fiction series, including Gene Roddenberry's Genesis II (1973) and favored proposals for a Planet of the Apes television series. Fox and CBS then continued Jacob's plans of a series the next year.

CBS ordered 14 episodes of Planet of the Apes to be produced. The series was filmed for the most part on location at what is now Malibu Creek State Park, with a budget of about $250,000 for each episode. Originally scheduled to be broadcast during CBS's Tuesday night family hour, the first regular episode of the series was broadcast on Friday, September 13, 1974 from 8:00-9:00 PM. The remainder of the series was broadcast during this same time slot until December 27, 1974, when its 14th and final broadcast was not shown as a result of a premature cancellation of the series due to poor ratings.

== Music ==
The series' main theme music was composed by Lalo Schifrin; Schifrin also scored three episodes of the series - "Escape From Tomorrow," "The Gladiators" and "The Good Seeds" (the latter, though not the premiere episode, was the first to be scored). Earle Hagen composed the scores for "The Legacy" and "Tomorrow's Tide," while Richard LaSalle wrote an original score for "The Trap." In addition, three episodes received partial scores - Hagen composed one for "The Surgeon," LaSalle composed "The Deception," and music supervisor Lionel Newman composed his only music for the series with "The Interrogation" (those last three, like the other episodes, were otherwise tracked with the music composed previously).

=== Intrada album ===
In 2005, Intrada released an album featuring Lalo Schifrin's beginning and ending music along with all three of Schifrin's scores and Earle Hagen's "The Legacy." The album also includes the logo music for Twentieth Century-Fox Television by Alfred Newman.

No.	Title	Length
1.	"Main Title"	1:16
2.	"Escape From Tomorrow: The Spaceship"	2:38
3.	"Apes"	2:46
4.	"The Warp"	2:03
5.	"Urko and Galen"	4:04
6.	"Prison Guard"	1:58
7.	"Jail Break"	3:29
8.	"Your World"	3:29
9.	"The Gladiators: Jason"	1:53
10.	"Fighting"	2:13
11.	"Barlow"	1:50
12.	"Trouble"	2:25
13.	"Into the Arena"	2:46
14.	"There Will Be Death"	0:53
15.	"Humans Versus Apes"	2:33
16.	"A Beginning"	2:28
17.	"The Legacy: Into the Ruined City"	2:25
18.	"The Machine"	0:50
19.	"The Soldiers"	2:30
20.	"The Key"	1:23
21.	"Virdon and the Kid"	1:10
22.	"The Family"	1:56
23.	"The Reward"	2:23
24.	"Knowledge Hunts"	3:11
25.	"Farewell"	0:35
26.	"The Good Seeds: Riding for Urko"	3:16
27.	"Travel Without Stars"	3:16
28.	"Attack"	3:16
29.	"Bonded Humans"	2:27
30.	"Next String"	2:27
31.	"End Credits"	0:28
Total length:		68:46

=== La-La Land album ===
In 2015, La-La Land Records issued a remastered and expanded limited edition album, featuring all six original scores plus the Newman material.

Disc 1: Music by Lalo Schifrin

No.	Title	Length
1.	"Main Title"	1:15
2.	"Escape From Tomorrow: Exotic Forest"	1:02
3.	"Spaceship"	1:41
4.	"Apes Urgency"	1:31
5.	"Concealment"	1:17
6.	"Apes Chase"	1:02
7.	"The Warp"	1:01
8.	"Urko/Galen"	4:12
9.	"The Master"	0:15
10.	"Prison Guard"	1:58
11.	"Prison Cell/Zaius"	1:27
12.	"Jail Break"	2:32
13.	"Your World"	1:54
14.	"The Gladiators: Wooded Area"	0:45
15.	"Jason"	0:27
16.	"Brutal Fight"	1:03
17.	"Track"	1:11
18.	"Barlow"	1:17
19.	"Ready"	0:36
20.	"Trouble With Apes"	1:43
21.	"Planet Of The Apes Mountains"	0:44
22.	"The Arena"	1:43
23.	"Wrestling In The Arena"	1:03
24.	"There Will Be A Death"	0:26
25.	"Allan In Jail"	0:28
26.	"Dalton"	1:05
27.	"Human Vs Apes"	1:26
28.	"A Beginning"	2:28
29.	"The Good Seeds: Riding With Urko"	1:46
30.	"Travel Without Stars"	3:17
31.	"Pitchfork Attack"	0:30
32.	"Local Patrol"	1:37
33.	"Plowing"	0:25
34.	"Central City"	0:16
35.	"Polar"	0:36
36.	"Zanties"	0:28
37.	"Virdon"	1:08
38.	"I've Seen Him Before"	0:21
39.	"Apes Neutral Suspense"	0:34
40.	"We Ride"	0:30
41.	"Discovered"	0:40
42.	"Toll The Bell"	0:12
43.	"The Riding Enemy"	0:22
44.	"Hunting Bonded Humans"	1:02
45.	"Twin Bulls"	1:25
46.	"Apes Tension"	1:33
47.	"Wind Mill"	0:25
48.	"The Next String"	0:54
49.	"End Credits"	0:30
50.	"Riding With Urko (Extension)"	1:54
Total length:		58:51

Disc 2: Theme by Lalo Schifrin, Music by Richard LaSalle, Earle Hagen and Lionel Newman

No.	Title	Length
1.	"Main Title"	1:16
2.	"The Trap: Opening"	1:04
3.	"Reflections"	2:30
4.	"Through The Forest"	1:15
5.	"The Bag"	0:31
6.	"Stalk In The City"	3:02
7.	"Hunted"	0:55
8.	"Searching"	1:00
9.	"Go To Work"	0:17
10.	"The Poster"	1:46
11.	"Urko Makes His Move"	1:07
12.	"The Execution"	2:30
13.	"One For The Road"	0:49
14.	"The Legacy: Country Style"	0:35
15.	"Ruined City"	1:13
16.	"Apes"	0:40
17.	"The Machine"	0:49
18.	"The Soldiers"	2:29
19.	"Ape Signals"	0:50
20.	"The Key"	0:34
21.	"Virdon And The Kid"	0:25
22.	"Urko"	0:44
23.	"The Family"	0:40
24.	"The Kids Toy"	0:20
25.	"Kids And Apes"	1:15
26.	"Farm Girl"	1:12
27.	"The Reward"	0:29
28.	"Apes And Kids"	0:44
29.	"Knowledge Hunts"	3:12
30.	"Farewell"	0:35
31.	"Tomorrow's Tide: Runners"	0:41
32.	"The Raft"	1:43
33.	"Fisherman's Love"	1:09
34.	"The Village"	0:48
35.	"Quotas Quotas"	0:18
36.	"Fire And Fish"	1:02
37.	"Garcon"	0:14
38.	"More Fine Divers"	0:33
39.	"Peter Dives"	0:31
40.	"The Sharks"	0:28
41.	"Sharks"	2:36
42.	"Find Him"	0:31
43.	"Gato Leaves"	0:50
44.	"Bandor"	0:31
45.	"Bandor The MC"	1:30
46.	"Escape"	1:49
47.	"Run Off"	0:18
48.	"The Surgeon: Medicine Off Center"	2:43
49.	"More Sutures"	1:32
50.	"The Deception: Farna Theme"	0:58
51.	"Farna Theme 2"	0:44
52.	"Farna"	0:36
53.	"Farna Reminisces"	1:11
54.	"Leave Me Alone"	0:31
55.	"Be Gentle With Her"	0:29
56.	"Deception"	1:40
57.	"Goodbye"	0:33
58.	"The Interrogation: Again"	1:33
59.	"Mish Mosh"	0:23
60.	"Drums And Bells"	2:04
61.	"Wind Machine"	1:04
62.	"End Credits"	0:30
Total length:		68:15

== Unfilmed episodes ==
- "Episode One" (written by Rod Serling as pilot episode; radically different from what was broadcast).
- "Episode Two" (written by Rod Serling as follow-up to his version of the pilot).
- "Hostage" (written by Stephen Kandel).
- "A Fallen God" (written by Anthony Lawrence).
- "The Trek" (written by Jim Byrnes).
- "Freedom Road" (written by Arthur Rowe).
- "The Mine" (written by Paul Savage).
- "The Trial" (written by Edward J. Lakso).

The scripts for "Episode One", "Episode Two", "Hostage" and "A Fallen God" are available online at Hunter's Planet of the Apes Archive. Details regarding "The Trek," "Freedom Road," "The Mine," and "The Trial" were provided in issue 12 of Simian Scrolls (a Planet of the Apes-based magazine), reprinted from the television series writer's bible.

== Broadcast history ==
The series was broadcast in the U.S. from September 13 to December 20, 1974. The show was canceled after half a season because of poor ratings due at least partly to direct competition by NBC's Sanford and Son and Chico and the Man. Only thirteen of its fourteen episodes were broadcast; all 14 episodes were later included in the DVD box set. It was later shown in reruns on the Sci Fi Channel. It also appeared on Monday nights on the Seven Network in Australia during 1975, then was repeated at 7:30pm Saturday evenings from 3 January 1976 and this was followed by subsequent screenings.

The series was broadcast in Britain by 13 of the 14 ITV companies from 13 October 1974 each Sunday, until 18 January 1975. Scottish Television (STV) never broadcast it during 1974/75, opting to broadcast Sale of the Century instead. The show was repeated in many regions from September 1975 until 1978, but was still not broadcast by STV. The series then received its first UK-wide transmissions on Channel 4 in 1994, and later the Sci Fi Channel. The television movie compilations have also been screened on Sky Movies, True Movies, True Entertainment (which also broadcast the show in original form) and Horror Channel.

During 2019, MeTV began broadcasting the series as part of its late Saturday Night "Red Eye Sci-Fi" block.

== Telefilms ==
In 1980, ten episodes of the series were edited into five made-for-television movies.

- Back to the Planet of the Apes ("Escape from Tomorrow" & "The Trap")
- Forgotten City of the Planet of the Apes ("Gladiators" & "Legacy")
- Treachery and Greed on the Planet of the Apes ("Horse Race" & "The Tyrant")
- Life, Liberty and Pursuit on the Planet of the Apes ("The Surgeon" & "The Interrogation")
- Farewell to the Planet of the Apes ("Tomorrow's Tide" & "Up Above The World So High")

When the Planet of the Apes telefilms began syndication, ABC's owned and operated stations, who bought them for their afternoon movie programs (with titles such as The 4:30 Movie), asked Roddy McDowall to re-create his role of Galen in a series of new beginnings and endings specifically for these stations, billed as "The New Planet of the Apes". The introductions created originally by 20th Century Fox to begin each film were replaced by a now-aged Galen (McDowall) examining the events of the telefilms. The beginnings and endings revealed Virdon and Burke's final fates: "They found their computer in another city and disappeared into space as suddenly as they'd arrived". According to "TV Zone Special #17" (1995 issue) these were taped "two years after the demise of the first run episodes of the Planet of the Apes television series", which would be December 1976. These wraparounds were neither broadcast by other stations nor included on any home media release.

== Spin-offs ==
Most of the books and comics based on Planet of the Apes are based on the movies, not the television series. However, there are some titles that do involve the television show characters.

=== Novels ===
Novelizations: Four novelizations of episodes, written by George Alec Effinger, were published by Award Books. Their titles are:

- Planet of the Apes #1: Man the Fugitive.
- Planet of the Apes #2: Escape From Tomorrow.
- Planet of the Apes #3: Journey Into Terror.
- Planet of the Apes #4: Lord of the Apes.

=== Comics ===
British Annuals: Brown Watson Books published three hardcover annuals featuring original stories about Virdon, Burke and Galen. These stories are a combination of comic strips and short fiction.

Argentine Comics: Seven Spanish-language comics were published in Argentina, written by Jorge Claudio Morhain and Richard Barreiro and illustrated by Sergio Mulko and T. Toledo. Released only in Argentina, they have never been published officially in English. However, PDFs of the comics, translated to English by fans, are available at Kassidy Rae's site (see link below).

Filmstrip Story: Chad Valley, a U.K. toy company, produced 32 short film-based comic strips containing an original TV-series-era story, presented as the Chad Valley Picture Show Planet of the Apes Sliderama Projector (very similar to the many Give-a-Show projector sets of the 1970s). These strips are extremely rare and difficult to find.

=== Audio ===
Audio Adventures—Power Records produced four audio-only adventures based on the TV show. Their titles were:

- Mountain of the Delphi
- Battle of Two Worlds
- Dawn of the Tree People
- Volcano
