= Planet of the Apes: Visionaries =

Publication information
- Publisher: Boom! Studios
- Publication date: August 2018
- No. of issues: 1
- Main character: Planet of the Apes

Creative team
- Written by: Rod Serling (original screenplay); Dana Gould
- Artist: Chad Lewis
- Letterer: Ed Dukeshire
- Colorist(s): Darrin Moore; Miquel Mureto; Marcelo Costa

Planet of the Apes: Visionaries is a comic book based on the Rod Serling script for the first Planet of the Apes film.

== Creation ==
Planet of the Apes: Visionaries was based on Rod Serling's unused script for the 1968 Planet of the Apes film. It follows the world from the acclaimed Planet of the Apes film series closely, but with key differences - Taylor is Thomas, and Ape City isn't a crude, primitive grouping of huts; instead, it's a bustling and urbane metropolis filled with cars and skyscrapers and a vibrant Ape culture. In a world where Apes wear modern clothes, drive modern cars and rule the late-night talk show scene, the arrival of one man will forever change how Apes – and Humans – view themselves.

== Publishing history ==
Dark Horse Comics had produced similar comics for Dan O'Bannon's original script for Alien and William Gibson's unproduced script for Alien 3 as part of the 20th Century Fox Uncovered line, which this comic was part of, from 2018 to 2020. Predator: The Original Screenplay was canceled mid-production due to the loss of the license.

== Plot ==
Human astronauts John Thomas, Paul LaFever and Dodge are in deep hibernation when their spaceship automatically lands on an unknown habitable planet after a two-thousand-year interstellar flight. A fourth crew mate, a man named Stewart, has died due to a malfunction in his pod. The survivors explore the planet, traveling through a wasteland until they discover a jungle. At a beach, they find a primitive human tribe, then are attacked by a group of gorilla and orangutans in helicopters and jeeps.

Dodge is killed while Thomas and Paul are captured separately, the former getting shot in the throat. Thomas awakens in a cell where other humans are kept and studied by chimpanzee scientists, including Dr. Zira. Unable to speak, Thomas steals her notebook and writes messages to Zira, proving his intelligence. Learning that there were others in his party, Zira takes Thomas to visit Paul, who has become catatonic after suffering a head injury.

Zira presents her findings to a scientific assembly, but is met with skepticism, especially from the orangutan Dr. Zaius, who believes Thomas to be a well-trained human. He orders a lobotomy. As he is being wheeled to the operating room, Thomas regains his voice in front of Zira and Zaius.

Now a celebrity, Thomas becomes acclimated with ape society. Thomas is appalled to see Dodge being turned into a stuffed museum exhibit. He learns that the Apes consider themselves evolved from humans. Thomas cracks this belief by teaching a female human named Nova to serve tea and speak.

At an archaeological excavation site near the radioactive zone, Thomas joins Zaius and Zira's fiancée Cornelius, who heads the expedition. They find skeletons, then a talking human doll and finally a fallout shelter. Ultimately, the site is leveled and Thomas is sentenced to death. Thomas escapes to his spaceship, only to find it unable to take off. Thomas then resolves to set off on foot towards the jungle to join the wild humans.

Zaius and gorilla military personnel catches up to Thomas, who stops after seeing a gigantic object. Zira and Cornelius plead to Thomas allows the gorillas to kill him, saying he has nowhere to go. As the apes leave the scene, the object is revealed to be a destroyed Statue of Liberty.

== Reception ==
Geek.com praised the book, and so did the website FlickeringMyth.com.
