= Planet of the Apes (1968 film) =

1968 film directed by Franklin J. Schaffner

- Theatrical release poster
- Directed by: Franklin J. Schaffner
- Screenplay by: Michael Wilson; Rod Serling
- Based on: Planet of the Apes (1963 novel) by Pierre Boulle
- Produced by: Arthur P. Jacobs
- Starring: Charlton Heston; Roddy McDowall; Maurice Evans; Kim Hunter; James Daly; James Whitmore; Linda Harrison
- Cinematography: Leon Shamroy
- Edited by: Hugh S. Fowler
- Music by: Jerry Goldsmith
- Color process: Eastmancolor
- Production company: APJAC Productions
- Distributed by: 20th Century-Fox
- Release dates: February 8, 1968 (Capitol Theatre); April 3, 1968 (United States)
- Running time: 112 minutes
- Country: United States
- Language: English
- Budget: $5.8 million
- Box office: $33.3 million

Planet of the Apes is a 1968 American science-fiction film directed by Franklin J. Schaffner from a screenplay by Michael Wilson and Rod Serling, loosely based on the 1963 novel by Pierre Boulle. The film stars Charlton Heston, Roddy McDowall, Kim Hunter, Maurice Evans, James Whitmore, James Daly, and Linda Harrison. In the film, an astronaut crew crash-lands on a strange planet in the distant future. Although the planet appears desolate at first, the surviving crew members stumble upon a society in which apes have evolved into creatures with human-like intelligence and speech. The apes have assumed the role of the dominant species and humans are mute primitives wearing animal skins.

The outline Planet of the Apes script, originally written by Serling, underwent many rewrites before filming eventually began. Directors J. Lee Thompson and Blake Edwards were approached, but the film's producer Arthur P. Jacobs, upon the recommendation of Heston, chose Franklin J. Schaffner to direct the film. The script portrayed an ape society less advanced—and therefore less expensive to depict—than that of the original novel. Filming took place between May 21 and August 10, 1967, in California, Utah, and Arizona, with desert sequences shot in and around Lake Powell, Glen Canyon National Recreation Area. The film's final "closed" cost was $5.8 million.

Planet of the Apes premiered on February 8, 1968, at the Capitol Theatre in New York City, and was released in the United States on April 3, by 20th Century-Fox. The film was a box-office hit, earning a lifetime domestic gross of $33.3 million. It was groundbreaking for its prosthetic makeup techniques by artist John Chambers and was well received by audiences and critics, being nominated for Best Costume Design and Best Original Score at the 41st Academy Awards, and winning an honorary Academy Award for Chambers. In 2001, Planet of the Apes was selected for preservation in the United States National Film Registry by the Library of Congress as being "culturally, historically, or aesthetically significant".

Planet of the Apes' success launched a franchise, including four sequels, as well as a television series, animated series, comic books, and various merchandising. In particular, Roddy McDowall had a long-running participation in the franchise, appearing in four of the original five films (he was absent from the second film, Beneath the Planet of the Apes, while directing his first motion picture and was replaced by David Watson in the role of Cornelius) and also in the television series. The original film series was followed by Tim Burton's remake of the same name in 2001 and a reboot series, which began with Rise of the Planet of the Apes in 2011.

== Plot ==
Teaser of the film

Astronauts Taylor, Landon, and Dodge awaken from deep hibernation after their spacecraft crashes into a lake on an unknown planet following a near-light-speed space voyage. Before they abandon their sinking vessel, Taylor, the mission commander, reads the ship's chronometer as November 25, 3978—approximately two millennia after their departure in 1972. The three astronauts have been in hibernation pods and have aged slightly less than one year. A fourth astronaut, Stewart, is found to be dead, having aged rapidly after her hibernation pod was compromised.

The men travel through a desolate wasteland before coming across an oasis inhabited by primitive, mute humans. Soon after, armed gorillas raid a cornfield where the humans are gathering food. Taylor is shot in the throat, Dodge is killed, and Landon is captured in the chaos. Taylor is taken to Ape City where his life is saved by two chimpanzees, animal psychologist Zira and surgeon Galen, though his throat injury renders him temporarily mute.

Taylor is placed with a captive woman, whom he later names Nova. He observes an advanced society of talking apes that considers primitive humans as vermin to be hunted and either killed, enslaved, or used in scientific experiments. Taylor convinces Zira and her fiancé, Cornelius, that he is as intelligent as they are, but Dr. Zaius, their orangutan superior, arranges for Taylor to be castrated against Zira's protests. Taylor escapes and finds Dodge's taxidermied corpse on display in a museum. He is soon recaptured, but regains his voice and commands one of the apes to take his paws off him.

A hearing is convened to determine Taylor's origins. Taylor mentions his two crewmates, learning that Landon was lobotomized and rendered catatonic. Claiming he is from an unknown human tribe beyond their borders, Zaius threatens to castrate and lobotomize Taylor if he does not reveal his origins. With help from Zira's nephew Lucius, Zira and Cornelius free Taylor and Nova and take them to the Forbidden Zone, a taboo region outside Ape City, where Taylor's ship crashed. To clear their heresy charges, Cornelius and Zira try to gather proof of an earlier nonsimian civilization, which Cornelius had discovered a year earlier; Taylor focuses on proving he comes from a different planet.

When the group arrives at the cave, Cornelius is intercepted by Zaius and his soldiers. Taylor holds them off by threatening to shoot Zaius, who agrees to enter the cave to disprove their theories. Inside, Cornelius displays remnants of a technologically advanced human society predating simian history, including a talking human doll. Zaius admits he has always known about the ancient human civilization. Taylor wants to search for answers, despite Zaius's warning that he will not like what he finds. After Taylor and Nova are allowed to leave, Zaius seals off the cave to destroy the evidence and charges Zira and Cornelius with heresy.

Taylor, Nova (Harrison), and the Statue of Liberty

Taylor and Nova follow the shoreline on horseback. Taylor discovers the remnants of the Statue of Liberty, revealing that this supposedly alien planet is Earth, long after a nuclear war. Taylor falls to his knees in despair, cursing humanity for destroying the world.

== Cast ==
- Charlton Heston as George Taylor
- Roddy McDowall as Dr. Cornelius
- Kim Hunter as Dr. Zira
- Maurice Evans as Dr. Zaius
- James Whitmore as President of the Assembly
- James Daly as Dr. Honorius
- Linda Harrison as Nova
- Jeff Burton as Dodge
- Robert Gunner as Landon
- Lou Wagner as Lucius
- Woodrow Parfrey as Dr. Maximus
- Buck Kartalian as Julius
- Norman Burton as Hunt Leader
- Wright King as Dr. Galen
- Paul Lambert as Minister
- Dianne Stanley as Stewart (4th astronaut; uncredited)

== Production ==
=== Origins ===
Producer Arthur P. Jacobs bought the rights for the Pierre Boulle novel before its publication in 1963. Jacobs pitched the production to many studios, and in late 1964, the project was announced as a Warner Bros. production, with Blake Edwards attached to direct. After Jacobs made a successful debut as a producer doing What a Way to Go! (1964) for 20th Century-Fox and begun pre-production of another film for the studio, Doctor Dolittle, he managed to convince Fox vice president Richard D. Zanuck to greenlight Planet of the Apes. In March 1965, Edwards bowed out of the project due to "budgeting and production problems", and embarked a six-picture deal with The Mirisch Company.

One script that came close to being made was written by The Twilight Zone creator Rod Serling, though it was finally rejected for a number of reasons. A prime concern was cost, as the technologically advanced ape society portrayed by Serling's script would have involved expensive sets, props, and special effects. Previously blacklisted screenwriter Michael Wilson was brought in to rewrite Serling's script, and as suggested by director Franklin J. Schaffner, the ape society was made more primitive as a way of reducing costs. Serling's stylized twist ending was retained, and became one of the most famous movie endings of all time. The exact location and state of decay of the Statue of Liberty changed over several storyboards. One version depicted the statue buried up to its nose in the middle of a jungle, while another depicted the statue in pieces.

To convince Fox that a Planet of the Apes film could be made, the producers shot a ten-minute test scene from a Rod Serling draft of the script, using early versions of the ape makeup, on March 8, 1966. Charlton Heston appeared as an early version of Taylor (named Thomas, as he was in the Serling-penned drafts), Edward G. Robinson appeared as Zaius, while two then-unknown Fox contract actors, James Brolin and Linda Harrison, played Cornelius and Zira. Harrison, who was at the time the girlfriend of studio chief Richard D. Zanuck, went on to be cast as Nova. Jacobs had at first considered Ursula Andress, then screen tested Angelique Pettyjohn, and even considered doing an international talent search for the role before Harrison's casting. Robinson wound up not joining the cast due to his declining health.

Michael Wilson's rewrite kept the basic structure of Serling's screenplay, but rewrote all the dialogue and set the script in a more primitive society. According to associate producer Mort Abrahams, an additional uncredited writer (his only recollection was that the writer's last name was Kelly) polished the script, rewrote some of the dialogue, and included some of the more heavy-handed tongue-in-cheek dialogue ("I never met an ape I didn't like"), which was not in either Serling or Wilson's drafts. According to Abrahams, some scenes, such as the one where the judges imitate the "see no evil, hear no evil, and speak no evil" monkeys, were improvised on the set by director Schaffner and kept in the final film because of the audience reaction during test screenings prior to release. During filming, John Chambers, who designed prosthetic makeup in the film, held training sessions at 20th Century-Fox studios, where he mentored other makeup artists of the film.

=== Filming ===
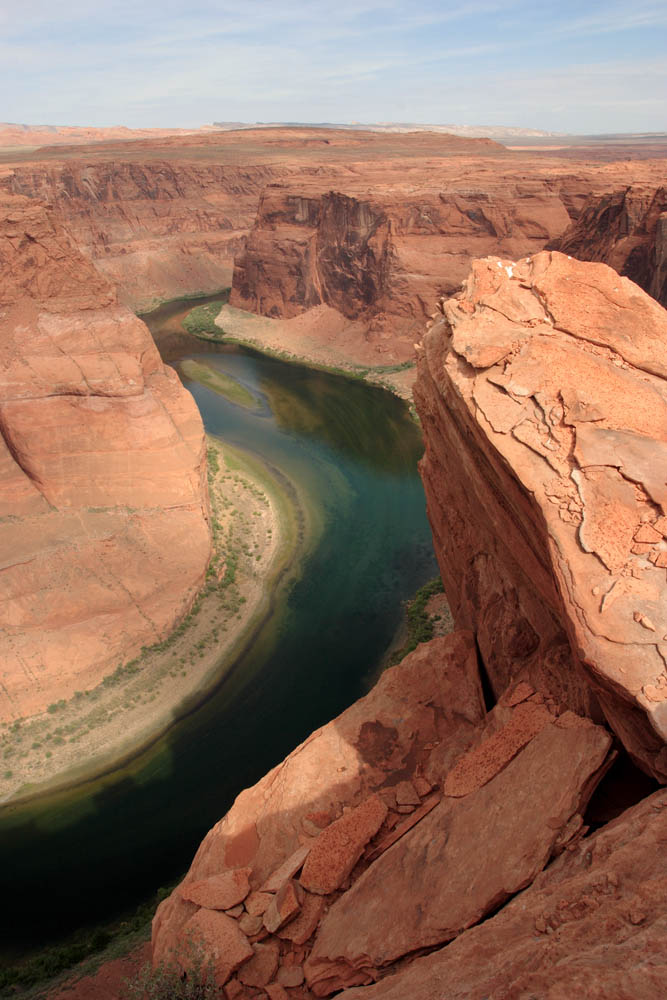
The astronauts' journey from their downed ship was filmed along the Colorado River in Glen Canyon.

Filming began on May 21, 1967, and wrapped on August 10. Most of the early scenes of a desert-like terrain were shot in northern Arizona near the Grand Canyon, the Colorado River, Lake Powell, Glen Canyon and other locations near Page, Arizona Most scenes of the ape village, interiors and exteriors, were filmed on the Fox Ranch in Malibu Creek State Park, northwest of Los Angeles, essentially the backlot of 20th Century-Fox. The concluding beach scenes were filmed on a stretch of California seacoast between Malibu and Oxnard, with cliffs that towered 130 feet (40 m) above the shore. Reaching the beach on foot was virtually impossible, so cast, crew, film equipment, and even horses had to be lowered in by helicopter.

The remains of the Statue of Liberty were shot in a secluded cove on the far eastern end of Westward Beach, between Zuma Beach and Point Dume in Malibu. As noted in the documentary Behind the Planet of the Apes, the special effect shot of the half-buried statue was achieved by seamlessly blending a matte painting with existing cliffs. The shot looking down at Taylor was done from a 70-foot (21 m) scaffold, angled over a 1/2-scale papier-mache model of the statue. The actors in Planet of the Apes were so affected by their roles and wardrobe that when not shooting, they automatically segregated themselves into groups of the species they were portraying. Lou Wagner said that the makeup was particularly heavy in the area of the mouth and made it difficult to drink anything.

At one point, Nova was decided to be pregnant, and scenes were filmed around the Page locations revealing Nova's pregnancy. In the penultimate drafts of Planet of the Apes, Taylor was killed by the bullet of an ape sniper, while Nova, pregnant with Taylor's child, escaped and vanished into the Forbidden Zone. Although Harrison believed Heston rejected the idea of Nova's pregnancy, those scenes were deleted, according to screenwriter Michael Wilson, "at the insistence of a high-echelon Fox executive who found it distasteful. Why? I suppose that, if one defines the mute Nova as merely 'humanoid' and not actually human, it would mean that Taylor had committed sodomy." Nova's pregnancy was thought to detract from the film's ending. In any case, all Harrison's scenes with Heston and Hunter in the sequence of Nova's pregnancy were cut. "There's probably a great deal of footage of it somewhere."

== Reception ==
=== Critical response ===
Planet of the Apes received good reviews at the time of its release. Several critics praised the film's pacing, social commentary, and science fiction ideas. Pauline Kael called it "one of the most entertaining science-fiction fantasies ever to come out of Hollywood". Roger Ebert of the Chicago Sun-Times gave the film three out of four and called it "much better than I expected it to be. It is quickly paced, completely entertaining, and its philosophical pretensions don't get in the way". Renata Adler of The New York Times wrote, "It is no good at all, but fun, at moments, to watch." Arthur D. Murphy of Variety called it "an amazing film." He thought the script "at times digresses into low comedy", but "the totality of the film works very well". Kevin Thomas of the Los Angeles Times wrote, "A triumph of artistry and imagination, it is at once a timely parable and a grand adventure on an epic scale." Richard L. Coe of The Washington Post called it an "amusing and unusually engrossing picture."

Decades later, it is widely regarded as a classic. It was rated one of the best films of 1968. As of August 2025, the film has an 86% rating on the review aggregate website Rotten Tomatoes, based on 96 reviews with an average rating of 7.60/10. The website's critical consensus reads, "Planet of the Apes raises thought-provoking questions about our culture without letting social commentary get in the way of the drama and action." On Metacritic, the film has an average score of 79 out of 100 based on 14 reviews. In 2008, the film was selected by Empire magazine as one of The 500 Greatest Movies of All Time.

=== Box office ===
According to Fox records, the film required $12,850,000 in theater rentals to break even, and made $20,825,000—a large profit for the studio.

=== Accolades ===
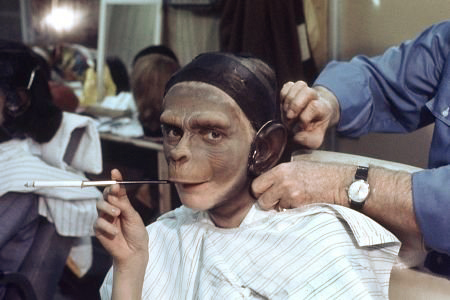
Kim Hunter undergoing the extensive ape makeup process.

The film won an honorary Academy Award for John Chambers for his outstanding makeup achievement. The film was nominated for Best Costume Design (Morton Haack) and Best Original Score for a Motion Picture (not a Musical) (Jerry Goldsmith). The score is known for its avant-garde compositional techniques, as well as the use of unusual percussion instruments and extended performance techniques, as well as his 12-tone music (the violin part using all 12 chromatic notes) to give an eerie, unsettled feel to the planet, mirroring the sense of placelessness.

American Film Institute Lists

- AFI's 100 Years...100 Movies – Nominated
- AFI's 100 Years...100 Thrills – #59
- AFI's 100 Years...100 Heroes and Villains:
  - Colonel George Taylor – Nominated Hero
- AFI's 100 Years...100 Movie Quotes:
  - "Take your stinking paws off me, you damned dirty ape!" – #66
- AFI's 100 Years of Film Scores – #18
- AFI's 100 Years...100 Movies (10th Anniversary Edition) – Nominated
- AFI's 10 Top 10 – Nominated Science Fiction Film

National Film Registry

- Among the 25 films inducted into the Library of Congress for 2001

== Legacy ==
=== Original series sequels ===
Writer Rod Serling was brought back to work on an outline for a sequel. Serling's outline was ultimately discarded in favor of an original story and screenplay by associate producer Mort Abrahams and writer Paul Dehn, which became the basis for Beneath the Planet of the Apes. The original film series had four sequels:

- Beneath the Planet of the Apes (1970)
- Escape from the Planet of the Apes (1971)
- Conquest of the Planet of the Apes (1972)
- Battle for the Planet of the Apes (1973)

=== Television series ===
- Planet of the Apes (1974)
- Return to the Planet of the Apes (animated) (1975)

=== Remake ===
- Planet of the Apes (2001): A reimagining of the original film, directed by Tim Burton.

=== Reboot series ===
- Rise of the Planet of the Apes (2011): A series reboot, directed by Rupert Wyatt, was released on August 5, 2011, to critical and commercial success. It is the first installment in the new series of films.
- Dawn of the Planet of the Apes (2014): The second entry in the Planet of the Apes reboot series, directed by Matt Reeves, was released on July 11, 2014.
- War for the Planet of the Apes (2017): The third film in the reboot series, directed by Matt Reeves, was released on July 14, 2017.
- Kingdom of the Planet of the Apes (2024): The fourth entry in the Planet of the Apes reboot series, directed by Wes Ball. It was released on May 10, 2024.

=== Documentaries ===
- Behind the Planet of the Apes (1998) A feature-length making-of documentary on the original film and TV series, hosted by Roddy McDowall.

=== Comics ===
- Comic book adaptations of the films were published by Gold Key (1970) and Marvel Comics (b/w magazine 1974–1977, color comic book 1975–76). Malibu Comics reprinted the Marvel adaptations when it held the license in the early 1990s, as well as producing new stories including Ape Nation, a crossover with Alien Nation. Dark Horse Comics published an adaptation for the 2001 Tim Burton film. Currently Boom! Studios has the licensing rights to Planet of the Apes. Its stories tell the tale of Ape City and its inhabitants before Taylor arrived. In July 2014, Boom! Studios and IDW Publishing published a crossover between Planet of the Apes and the original Star Trek series. In 2018, the original 1968 film's unused screenplay by Rod Serling was adapted into a graphic novel entitled Planet of the Apes: Visionaries.

== Gallery ==
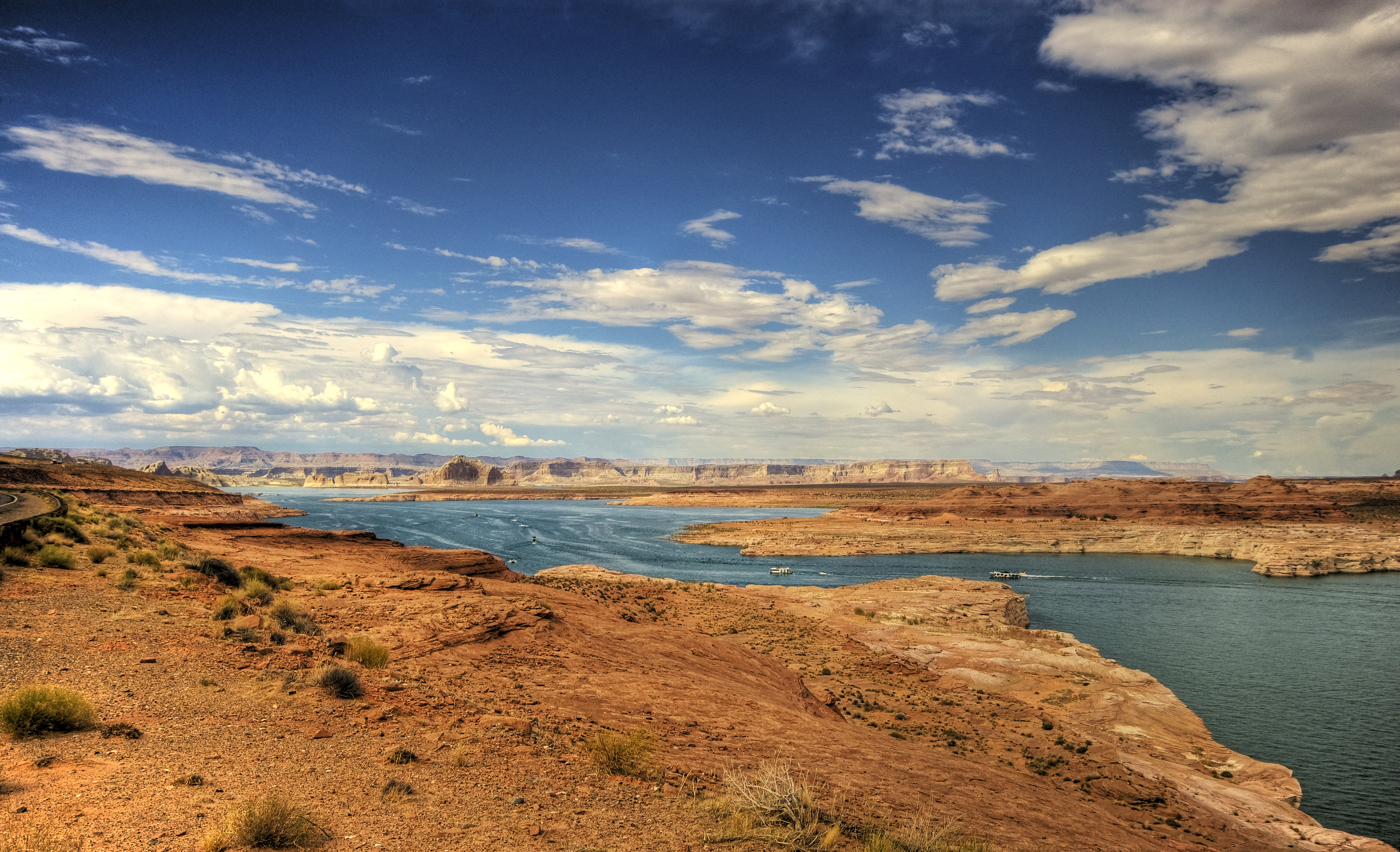
The crash of the astronauts' spacecraft was partially filmed in and around Lake Powell.

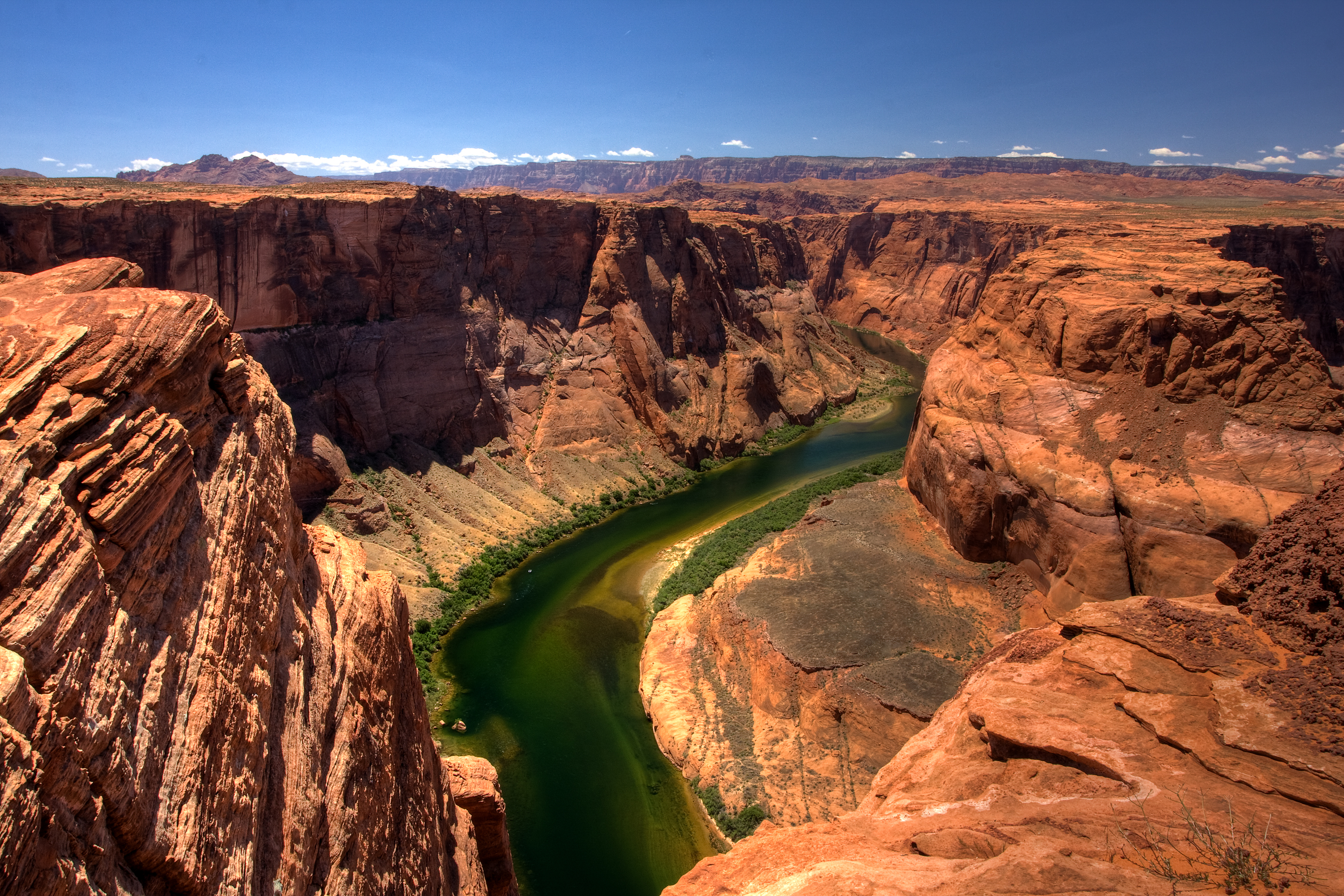
Horseshoe Bend on the Colorado River, near Page, Arizona, was a part of the Forbidden Zone, through which Taylor, Zira, and Cornelius fled Ape City.

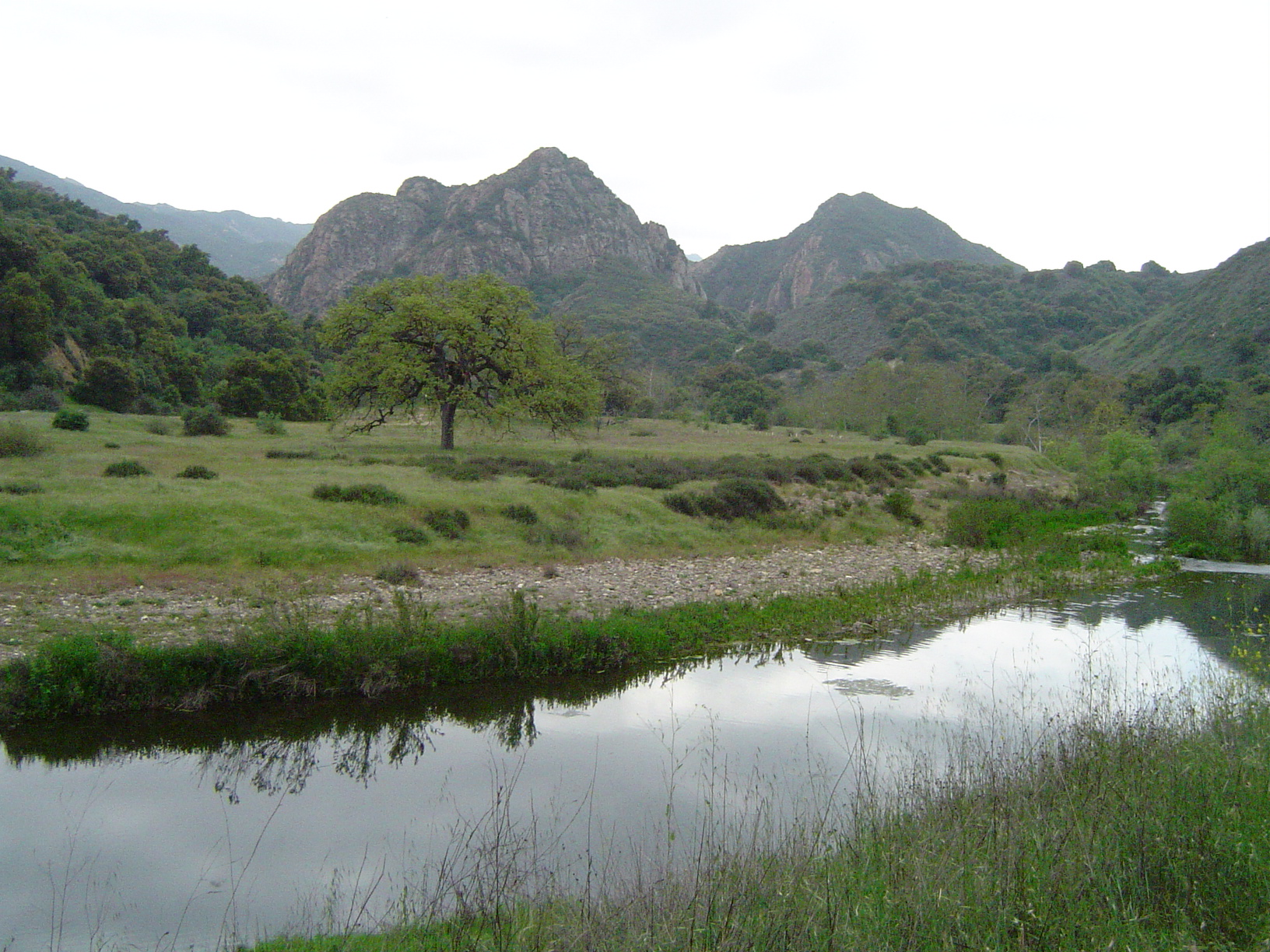
Malibu Creek State Park, part of which was formerly the 20th Century Fox Movie Ranch, was the location of the astronauts' initial encounter with primitive humans and superior apes, and of Cornelius, Zira and Taylor's escape from Ape City.

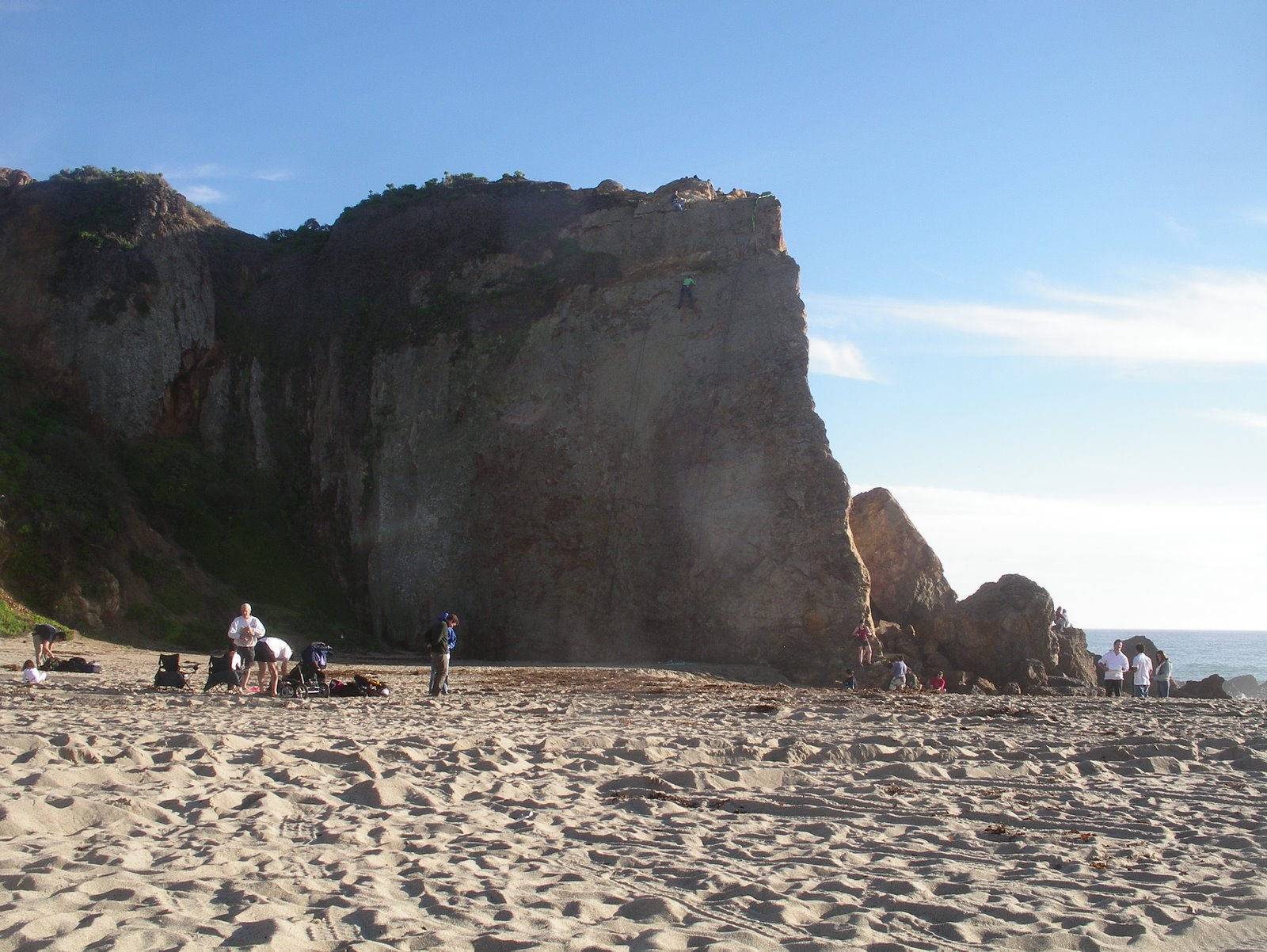
The final scene was filmed at Point Dume's Westward Beach on the Malibu coast.

== See also ==
- List of American films of 1968
- List of cult films
- List of fictional primates
- Apocalyptic and post-apocalyptic fiction, about the film genre, with a list of related films
- Survival film, about the film genre, with a list of related films
