= Planet of the Apes/Green Lantern =

2017 comic book series

Publication information
- Publisher: Boom! Studios
- Format: Ongoing series
- No. of issues: 6
- Main character(s): Green Lantern; Planet of the Apes

Creative team
- Written by: Justin Jordan; Robbie Thompson
- Artist: Barnaby Bagenda

Green Lantern on-the Planet of the Apes (first published as Planet of the Apes/Green Lantern) is a 2017 comic book series.

== Plot ==
When temporally displaced astronaut Colonel George Taylor goes missing on the alternate future Earth known as the "Planet of the Apes", Cornelius investigates and discovers an ancient ring, unlike anything his universe has ever seen. As its power echoes through the multiverse, the Guardians of the Universe must reveal to the Green Lantern Corps a secret they had hoped would remain buried. With the Green Lantern Corps, led by Hal Jordan, racing to get to the source of this power before Sinestro can get his hands on it, they will discover a secret concealed by the Guardians of the Universe on an alternate Earth trapped within a time loop: the setting of Planet of the Apes.

After the Sinestro Corps drains energy from members of the other Lantern Corps for a specific objective, on the alternate Earth of Planet of the Apes, chimpanzee scientist Cornelius finds a mysterious artefact in a newly formed crater. Due to Sinestro's machinations, Hal Jordan and Sinestro are transported across the multiverse and trapped in the Planet of the Apes universe. Jordan is captured by Ape City security personnel, while Sinestro captures Doctor Zaius, the orangutan leader of Ape City. Back in Earth-0's universe, the Guardians reveal to members of the Green Lantern Corps that one of their earlier experiments after the creation of the Manhunters was a Universal Ring, which possessed the power to tap into the entire emotional spectrum. Realising that it was too powerful to control, although they lacked the ability to destroy it, the Guardians instead trapped the universal ring in an alternate Earth that is trapped itself within a time loop. On this world, humanity destroyed itself in a nuclear war and is replaced by sapient apes, assisted by a genetically engineered virus. While Hal breaks out of Ape City prison with the assistance of Zira and other dissident chimpanzees and Sinestro abducts Dr. Zaius and attempts to stage a coup, the Green Lantern Corps decide to "recruit" Gorilla Grodd to assist in their recovery of Hal Jordan and the Universal Ring. Meanwhile, in the underground settlement of telepathic mutants within the ruins of New York City, Cornelius has used the Universal Ring to repel attackers and discovered 20th-century astronaut Colonel George Taylor dead from a bullet wound. Angered at the loss of life and the presence of a cobalt bomb doomsday device worshipped by the mutants, he dismantles the device. Matters get more complicated when Cornelius's efforts provide the mutants with power rings of their own, while the Red Lantern Corps discover the existence of the Planet of the Apes and the presence of the Green Lanterns there and give pursuit. Sinestro and Dr. Zaius discover a long-concealed secret about the origin of this future alternate Earth.

== Reception ==
The comic has received positive reviews.
