= List of accolades received by Winter's Bone =

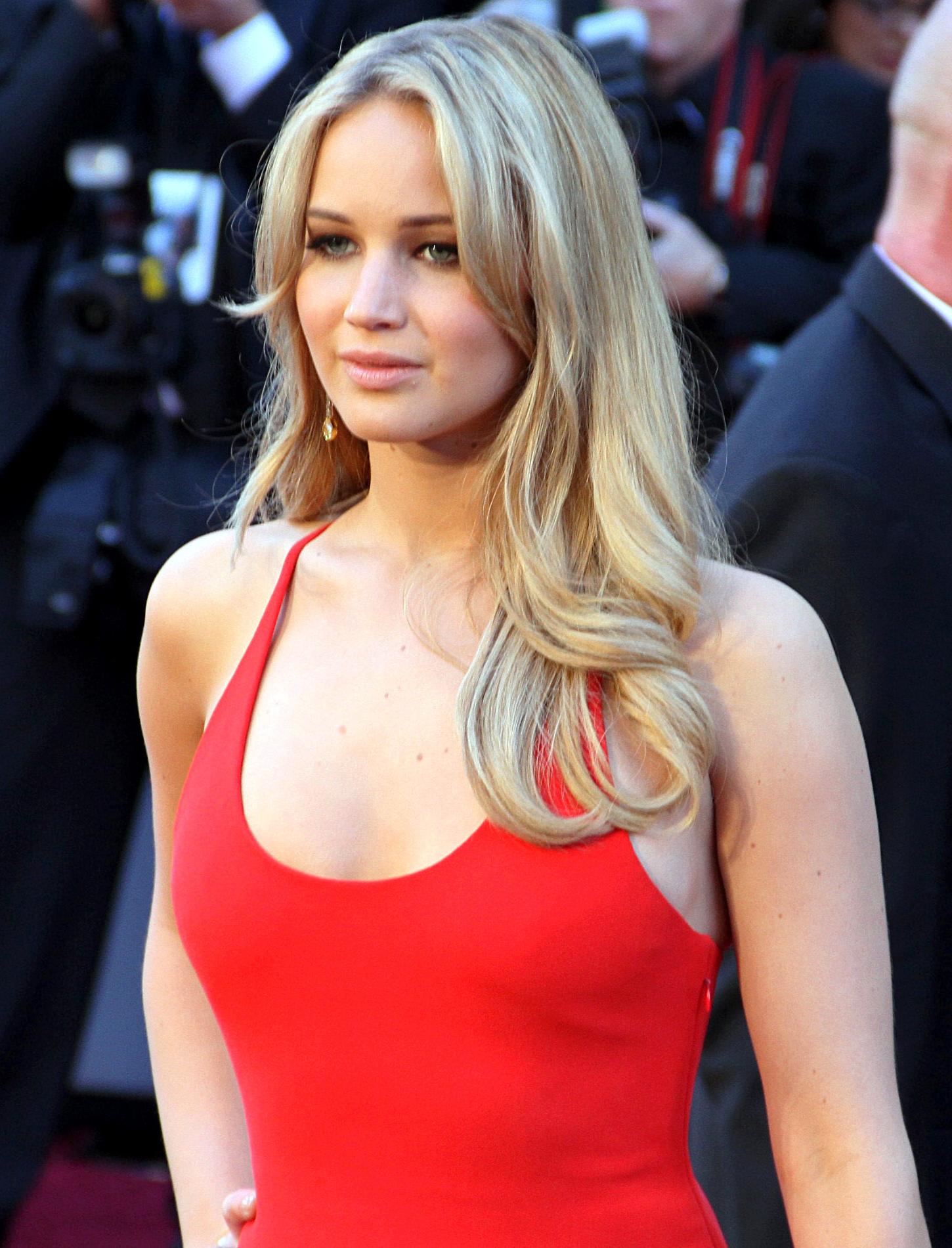
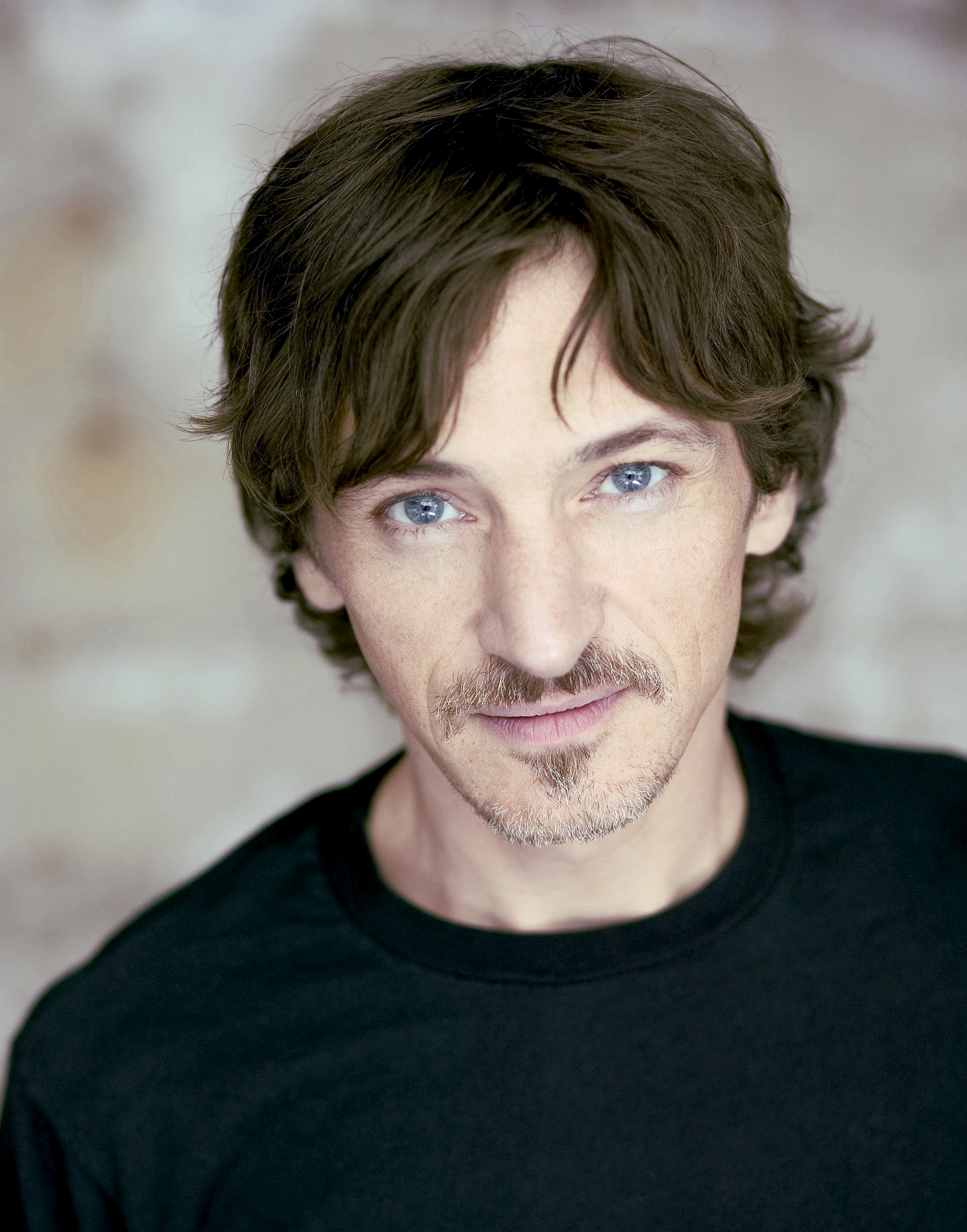
- Jennifer Lawrence (left) and John Hawkes (right) earned several awards and nominations for their performances in the film, including nominations for an Academy Award for Best Actress in a Leading Role and Best Actor in a Supporting Role, respectively.
Awards and nominations
Award	Won	Nominated
Academy Awards	0	4
Alliance of Women Film Journalists	3	11
American Film Institute	1	1
Austin Film Critics Association	0	1
Belgian Syndicate of Cinema Critics	0	1
Berlin International Film Festival	2	2
British Independent Film Awards	0	1
Broadcast Film Critics Association	0	4
Chicago Film Critics Association	1	6
Dallas-Fort Worth Film Critics Association	1	2
Detroit Film Critics Society	3	6
Empire Awards	0	1
Golden Globe Awards	0	1
Gotham Awards	2	4
Hollywood Film Festival	1	1
Houston Film Critics Society	1	1
Independent Spirit Awards	2	7
Los Angeles Film Critics Association	0	1
National Board of Review Awards	2	2
San Francisco Film Critics Circle	1	1
Satellite Awards	0	4
Screen Actors Guild	0	2
Seattle International Film Festival	2	2
St. Louis Film Critics Association Awards	0	4
Stockholm Film Festival Awards	3	3
Sundance Film Festival	2	2
Toronto Film Critics Association	1	1
Washington D.C. Area Film Critics Association	1	2
- Total number of wins and nominations
Totals	29	77
- References

Winter's Bone is a 2010 independent American drama film directed by Debra Granik. Adapted by Granik and Anne Rosellini from the 2006 novel of the same name by author Daniel Woodrell, the movie was released by Roadside Attractions in the United States and Canada on June 11, 2010. It grossed over US$84,000 in its opening weekend on limited release. Since then it has grossed over US$6,500,000 domestically and US$12,460,000 worldwide. Winter's Bone was well received by movie critics, with an approval rating of 94 percent on the review aggregator Rotten Tomatoes. The film appeared in more than two dozen movie reviewers' Top Ten lists for the best movies of the year.

The film has received honors in different categories, ranging from recognition of the movie itself, to its direction, cinematography and writing, as well as for performances by the cast, mainly Jennifer Lawrence for Best Actress and John Hawkes for Best Supporting Actor. Lawrence's breakthrough role as Ree Dolly in this movie also earned her several Best Breakthrough Performance awards. At the 68th Golden Globe Awards ceremony, Winter's Bone earned one nomination for Best Actress in a Motion Picture – Drama. It received four nominations—including Best Actress—at the 83rd Academy Awards, but failed to win any accolades. Lawrence, at 20, was the second-youngest person ever nominated for Best Actress by the academy at that time. The movie fared better at the 26th Independent Spirit Awards, where it received seven nominations and won awards for Best Supporting Female and Best Supporting Male. Both the principal actors earned a nomination at the 17th Screen Actors Guild Awards.

Prior to its June theatrical release, Winter's Bone was screened at film festivals, where it received other prizes. The movie was nominated for and won two Golden Space Needle Awards at the Seattle International Film Festival. Its debut at the 2010 Sundance Film Festival earned the movie the two accolades for which it was nominated, one being the Grand Jury Prize for a dramatic film. Winter's Bone was included in the Top Ten Best Films of 2010 categories by the American Film Institute and National Board of Review Awards, among others. At the Detroit Film Critics Society Awards, and Gotham Independent Film Awards, the cast of Winter's Bone was nominated for Best Ensemble. In total, the film has won 29 awards from 76 nominations.

== Awards and nominations ==
Award	Date of ceremony	Category	Recipients	Result
Academy Awards	February 27, 2011	Best Picture	Anne Rosellini and Alix Madigan-Yorkin	Nominated
Academy Awards	February 27, 2011	Best Actress	Jennifer Lawrence	Nominated
Academy Awards	February 27, 2011	Best Supporting Actor	John Hawkes	Nominated
Academy Awards	February 27, 2011	Best Adapted Screenplay	Debra Granik and Anne Rosellini	Nominated
Alliance of Women Film Journalists	January 10, 2011	Best Film	Winter's Bone	Nominated
Alliance of Women Film Journalists	January 10, 2011	Best Director	Debra Granik	Nominated
Alliance of Women Film Journalists	January 10, 2011	Best Actress	Jennifer Lawrence	Nominated
Alliance of Women Film Journalists	January 10, 2011	Best Supporting Actor	John Hawkes	Nominated
Alliance of Women Film Journalists	January 10, 2011	Best Adapted Screenplay	Debra Granik and Anne Rosellini	Nominated
Alliance of Women Film Journalists	January 10, 2011	Best Cinematography	Michael McDonough	Nominated
Alliance of Women Film Journalists	January 10, 2011	Best Ensemble Cast	Winter's Bone	Nominated
Alliance of Women Film Journalists	January 10, 2011	Best Woman Director	Debra Granik	Won
Alliance of Women Film Journalists	January 10, 2011	Best Woman Screenwriter	Debra Granik	Nominated
Alliance of Women Film Journalists	January 10, 2011	Best Breakthrough Performance	Jennifer Lawrence	Won
Alliance of Women Film Journalists	January 10, 2011	This Year's Outstanding Achievement By A Woman In The Film Industry	Debra Granik	Won
American Film Institute Awards	December 12, 2010	Best 10 Movies	Alix Madigan-Yorkin and Anne Rosellini	Won
Austin Film Critics Association	December 19, 2010	Top 10 Films	Winter's Bone	Nominated
Belgian Film Critics Association	January 7, 2012	Grand Prix	Winter's Bone	Nominated
Berlin International Film Festival	February 21, 2010	C.I.C.A.E. Award (Forum)	Debra Granik	Won
Berlin International Film Festival	February 21, 2010	Reader Jury of the "Tagesspiegel"	Debra Granik	Won
British Independent Film Awards	December 5, 2010	Best Foreign Film	Alix Madigan-Yorkin and Anne Rosellini	Nominated
Broadcast Film Critics Association Awards	January 14, 2011	Best Film	Alix Madigan-Yorkin and Anne Rosellini	Nominated
Broadcast Film Critics Association Awards	January 14, 2011	Best Actress	Jennifer Lawrence	Nominated
Broadcast Film Critics Association Awards	January 14, 2011	Best Young Performer	Jennifer Lawrence	Nominated
Broadcast Film Critics Association Awards	January 14, 2011	Best Writer	Debra Granik and Anne Rosellini	Nominated
Chicago Film Critics Association	December 20, 2010	Best Actress	Jennifer Lawrence	Nominated
Chicago Film Critics Association	December 20, 2010	Best Adapted Screenplay	Debra Granik and Anne Rosellini	Nominated
Chicago Film Critics Association	December 20, 2010	Best Director	Debra Granik	Nominated
Chicago Film Critics Association	December 20, 2010	Best Film	Winter's Bone	Nominated
Chicago Film Critics Association	December 20, 2010	Most Promising Performer	Jennifer Lawrence	Won
Chicago Film Critics Association	December 20, 2010	Best Supporting Actor	John Hawkes	Nominated
Dallas-Fort Worth Film Critics Association	December 17, 2010	Best Actress	Jennifer Lawrence	Nominated
Dallas-Fort Worth Film Critics Association	December 17, 2010	Top 10 Films	Winter's Bone	Won
Detroit Film Critics Society	December 17, 2010	Best Film	Alix Madigan-Yorkin & Anne Rosellini	Nominated
Detroit Film Critics Society	December 17, 2010	Best Director	Debra Granik	Nominated
Detroit Film Critics Society	December 17, 2010	Best Actress	Jennifer Lawrence	Won
Detroit Film Critics Society	December 17, 2010	Best Supporting Actor	John Hawkes	Nominated
Detroit Film Critics Society	December 17, 2010	Best Ensemble	Jennifer Lawrence, Casey MacLaren, Dale Dickey, Tate Taylor, Shelley Waggener, Kevin Breznahan, Garret Dillahunt, Sheryl Lee, John Hawkes	Won
Detroit Film Critics Society	December 17, 2010	Breakthrough Performance	Jennifer Lawrence	Won
Empire Awards	March 27, 2011	Best Newcomer	Jennifer Lawrence	Nominated
Golden Globe Awards	January 16, 2010	Best Actress Motion Picture Drama	Jennifer Lawrence	Nominated
Gotham Independent Film Awards	November 29, 2010	Best Feature	Alix Madigan-Yorkin and Anne Rosellini	Won
Gotham Independent Film Awards	November 29, 2010	Breakthrough Actor	Jennifer Lawrence	Nominated
Gotham Independent Film Awards	November 29, 2010	Best Ensemble	Jennifer Lawrence, Casey MacLaren, Dale Dickey, Tate Taylor, Shelley Waggener, Kevin Breznahan, Garret Dillahunt, Sheryl Lee, John Hawkes	Won
Gotham Independent Film Awards	November 29, 2010	Audience Award	Winter's Bone	Nominated
Hollywood Film Festival Awards	October 25, 2010	Best Breakthrough Performance	Jennifer Lawrence	Won
Houston Film Critics Society Awards	December 18, 2010	Best Actress	Jennifer Lawrence	Won
Independent Spirit Awards	February 26, 2011	Best Film	Alix Madigan-Yorkin and Anne Rosellini	Nominated
Independent Spirit Awards	February 26, 2011	Best Director	Debra Granik	Nominated
Independent Spirit Awards	February 26, 2011	Best Screenplay	Debra Granik and Anne Rosellini	Nominated
Independent Spirit Awards	February 26, 2011	Best Female Lead	Jennifer Lawrence	Nominated
Independent Spirit Awards	February 26, 2011	Best Supporting Female	Dale Dickey	Won
Independent Spirit Awards	February 26, 2011	Best Supporting Male	John Hawkes	Won
Independent Spirit Awards	February 26, 2011	Best Cinematography	Michael McDonough	Nominated
Los Angeles Film Critics Association	December 11, 2010	Best Actress	Jennifer Lawrence	Nominated
National Board of Review Awards	December 1, 2010	Top Ten Films	Alix Madigan-Yorkin and Anne Rosellini	Won
National Board of Review Awards	December 1, 2010	Breakthrough Performance	Jennifer Lawrence	Won
San Francisco Film Critics Circle Awards	December 13, 2010	Best Supporting Actor	John Hawkes	Won
Satellite Awards	December 19, 2010	Best Actress — Drama	Jennifer Lawrence	Nominated
Satellite Awards	December 19, 2010	Best Film — Drama	Alix Madigan-Yorkin and Anne Rosellini	Nominated
Satellite Awards	December 19, 2010	Best Director	Debra Granik	Nominated
Satellite Awards	December 19, 2010	Best Screenplay — Adapted	Debra Granik and Anne Rosellini	Nominated
Screen Actors Guild Awards	January 30, 2011	Outstanding Female Actor – Leading Role	Jennifer Lawrence	Nominated
Screen Actors Guild Awards	January 30, 2011	Outstanding Male Actor – Supporting Role	John Hawkes	Nominated
Seattle International Film Festival	June 13, 2010	Golden Space Needle Award for Best Actress	Jennifer Lawrence	Won
Seattle International Film Festival	June 13, 2010	Golden Space Needle Award for Best Director	Debra Granik	Won
St. Louis Film Critics Association Awards	December 20, 2010	Best Actress	Jennifer Lawrence	Nominated
St. Louis Film Critics Association Awards	December 20, 2010	Best Supporting Actor	John Hawkes	Nominated
St. Louis Film Critics Association Awards	December 20, 2010	Best Adapted Screenplay	Debra Granik and Anne Rosellini	Nominated
St. Louis Film Critics Association Awards	December 20, 2010	Best Artistic/Creative Film	Alix Madigan-Yorkin and Anne Rosellini	Nominated
Stockholm Film Festival Awards	November 28, 2010	Best Film	Alix Madigan-Yorkin and Anne Rosellini	Won
Stockholm Film Festival Awards	November 28, 2010	Best Actress	Jennifer Lawrence	Won
Stockholm Film Festival Awards	November 28, 2010	FIPRESCI Award	Debra Granik	Won
Sundance Film Festival	January 31, 2010	Grand Jury Prize: Dramatic Film	Alix Madigan-Yorkin and Anne Rosellini	Won
Sundance Film Festival	January 31, 2010	Waldo Salt Screenwriting Award	Debra Granik and Anne Rosellini	Won
Toronto Film Critics Association Awards	December 13, 2010	Best Actress	Jennifer Lawrence	Won
Washington D.C. Area Film Critics Association Awards	December 6, 2010	Best Actress	Jennifer Lawrence	Won
Washington D.C. Area Film Critics Association Awards	December 6, 2010	Best Supporting Actor	John Hawkes	Nominated

== See also ==
- List of oldest and youngest Academy Award winners and nominees – Youngest nominees for Best Actress in a Leading Role
- List of awards and nominations received by Jennifer Lawrence
