= Satellite Award for Best Adapted Screenplay =

International Press Academy award

- Awarded for: Best Adapted Screenplay
- Country: United States
- Presented by: International Press Academy
- First award: 1996
- Currently held by: Cord Jefferson – American Fiction (2023)

The Satellite Award for Best Adapted Screenplay is an annual award given by the International Press Academy.

== Winners and nominees ==
=== 1990s ===
Year	Film	Recipient(s)
1996	The English Patient	Anthony Minghella
1996	The Crucible	Arthur Miller
1996	Jude	Hossein Amini
1996	The Portrait of a Lady	Laura Jones
1996	Trainspotting	John Hodge
1997	L.A. Confidential	Curtis Hanson and Brian Helgeland
1997	Amistad	David Franzoni
1997	The Ice Storm	James Schamus
1997	The Sweet Hereafter	Atom Egoyan
1997	The Wings of the Dove	Hossein Amini
1998	Gods and Monsters	Bill Condon
1998	Beloved	Adam Brooks, Akosua Busia, and Richard LaGravenese
1998	Hilary and Jackie	Frank Cottrell Boyce
1998	Little Voice	Mark Herman
1998	The Thin Red Line	Terrence Malick
1999	The Cider House Rules	John Irving
1999	Felicia's Journey	Atom Egoyan
1999	A Map of the World	Peter Hedges and Polly Platt
1999	Onegin	Peter Ettedgui and Michael Ignatieff
1999	The Talented Mr. Ripley	Anthony Minghella
1999	Titus	Julie Taymor

=== 2000s ===
Year	Film	Recipient(s)
2000	Quills	Doug Wright
2000	The House of Mirth	Terence Davies
2000	O Brother, Where Art Thou?	Joel Coen and Ethan Coen
2000	Thirteen Days	David Self
2000	Traffic	Stephen Gaghan
2001	In the Bedroom	Robert Festinger and Todd Field
2001	A Beautiful Mind	Akiva Goldsman
2001	Hedwig and the Angry Inch	John Cameron Mitchell
2001	Last Orders	Fred Schepisi
2001	The Lord of the Rings: The Fellowship of the Ring	Philippa Boyens, Peter Jackson, and Fran Walsh
2002	Adaptation.	Charlie and Donald Kaufman
2002	Chicago	Bill Condon
2002	The Lord of the Rings: The Two Towers	Philippa Boyens, Peter Jackson, Stephen Sinclair, and Fran Walsh
2002	My Big Fat Greek Wedding	Nia Vardalos
2002	The Pianist	Ronald Harwood
2003	Mystic River	Brian Helgeland
2003	American Splendor	Shari Springer Berman and Robert Pulcini
2003	Cold Mountain	Anthony Minghella
2003	Seabiscuit	Gary Ross
2003	Shattered Glass	Billy Ray
2003	Whale Rider	Niki Caro
2004	Million Dollar Baby	Paul Haggis
2004	Closer	Patrick Marber
2004	The Phantom of the Opera	Joel Schumacher
2004	Sideways	Alexander Payne and Jim Taylor
2005	Memoirs of a Geisha	Robin Swicord
2005	Brokeback Mountain	Larry McMurtry and Diana Ossana
2005	Capote	Dan Futterman
2005	Jarhead	William Broyles Jr.
2005	Shopgirl	Steve Martin
2005	Walk the Line	Gill Dennis and James Mangold
2006	The Departed	William Monahan
2006	Dreamgirls	Bill Condon
2006	Flags of Our Fathers	William Broyles, Jr. and Paul Haggis
2006	Little Children	Todd Field and Tom Perrotta
2006	A Prairie Home Companion	Garrison Keillor
2006	Thank You for Smoking	Jason Reitman
2007	Atonement	Christopher Hampton
2007	Away from Her	Sarah Polley
2007	The Kite Runner	David Benioff
2007	Lust, Caution (Se, jie)	Hui-Ling Wang and James Schamus
2007	No Country for Old Men	Joel Coen and Ethan Coen
2007	Zodiac	James Vanderbilt
2008	Frost/Nixon	Peter Morgan
2008	The Curious Case of Benjamin Button	Eric Roth and Robin Swicord
2008	Doubt	John Patrick Shanley
2008	Elegy	Philip Roth
2008	The Reader	David Hare
2008	Revolutionary Road	Justin Haythe
2008	Slumdog Millionaire	Simon Beaufoy
2009	Precious	Geoffrey S. Fletcher
2009	District 9	Neill Blomkamp and Terri Tatchell
2009	An Education	Nick Hornby
2009	Julie & Julia	Nora Ephron
2009	Up in the Air	Sheldon Turner and Jason Reitman

=== 2010s ===
Year	Film	Recipient(s)
2010	The Social Network	Aaron Sorkin
2010	127 Hours	Danny Boyle and Simon Beaufoy
2010	Fair Game	Jez Butterworth and John-Henry Butterworth
2010	The Ghost Writer	Robert Harris and Roman Polanski
2010	The Girl with the Dragon Tattoo	Nikolaj Arcel and Rasmus Heisterberg
2010	Scott Pilgrim vs. the World	Michael Bacall and Edgar Wright
2010	The Town	Ben Affleck, Peter Craig, and Aaron Stockard
2010	Winter's Bone	Debra Granik and Anne Rosellini
2011	The Descendants	Alexander Payne, Jim Rash, and Nat Faxon
2011	The Adventures of Tintin: The Secret of the Unicorn	Edgar Wright, Joe Cornish, and Steven Moffat
2011	Albert Nobbs	Glenn Close and John Banville
2011	The Help	Tate Taylor
2011	Moneyball	Aaron Sorkin and Steven Zaillian
2011	War Horse	Lee Hall and Richard Curtis
2012	Life of Pi	David Magee
2012	Anna Karenina	Tom Stoppard
2012	Argo	Chris Terrio
2012	Lincoln	Tony Kushner
2012	Silver Linings Playbook	David O. Russell
2012	The Sessions	Ben Lewin
2013	Philomena	Jeff Pope and Steve Coogan
2013	12 Years a Slave	John Ridley
2013	Before Midnight	Richard Linklater, Ethan Hawke, and Julie Delpy
2013	Captain Phillips	Billy Ray
2013	Lone Survivor	Peter Berg
2013	The Wolf of Wall Street	Terence Winter
2014	The Imitation Game	Graham Moore
2014	American Sniper	Jason Hall
2014	Gone Girl	Gillian Flynn
2014	Inherent Vice	Paul Thomas Anderson
2014	The Theory of Everything	Anthony McCarten
2014	Wild	Cheryl Strayed and Nick Hornby
2015	Steve Jobs	Aaron Sorkin
2015	Black Mass	Jez Butterworth and Mark Mallouk
2015	The Danish Girl	Lucinda Coxon
2015	The Martian	Drew Goddard
2015	The Revenant	Alejandro G. Iñárritu and Mark L. Smith
2015	Room	Emma Donoghue
2016	Snowden	Kieran Fitzgerald and Oliver Stone
2016	Hacksaw Ridge	Andrew Knight and Robert Schenkkan
2016	Hidden Figures	Theodore Melfi and Allison Schroeder
2016	The Jungle Book	Justin Marks
2016	Lion	Luke Davies
2016	Sully	Todd Komarnicki
2017	The Disaster Artist	Scott Neustadter and Michael H. Weber
2017	Call Me by Your Name	James Ivory
2017	Molly's Game	Aaron Sorkin
2017	Victoria & Abdul	Lee Hall
2017	Wonderstruck	Brian Selznick
2017	Wonder Woman	Allan Heinberg, Zack Snyder, and Jason Fuchs
2018	Can You Ever Forgive Me?	Nicole Holofcener and Jeff Whitty
2018	BlacKkKlansman	Spike Lee, David Rabinowitz, Kevin Willmott, and Charlie Wachtel
2018	The Death of Stalin	Armando Iannucci, David Schneider, Ian Martin, and Peter Fellows
2018	If Beale Street Could Talk	Barry Jenkins
2018	Leave No Trace	Debra Granik and Anne Rosellini
2018	A Star Is Born	Bradley Cooper and Eric Roth
2019	Joker	Todd Phillips and Scott Silver
2019	Dark Waters	Matthew Michael Carnahan, Mario Correa, and Nathaniel Rich
2019	The Irishman	Steven Zaillian
2019	Jojo Rabbit	Taika Waititi
2019	Motherless Brooklyn	Edward Norton
2019	The Two Popes	Anthony McCarten

=== 2020s ===
Year	Film	Recipient(s)
2020	The Father	Christopher Hampton and Florian Zeller
2020	The Life Ahead	Edoardo Ponti
2020	Ma Rainey's Black Bottom	Ruben Santiago-Hudson
2020	News of the World	Luke Davies and Paul Greengrass
2020	Nomadland	Jessica Bruder and Chloé Zhao
2020	One Night in Miami...	Kemp Powers
2021	CODA	Sian Heder
2021	Dune	Eric Roth, Jon Spaihts, and Denis Villeneuve
2021	The Lost Daughter	Maggie Gyllenhaal
2021	Passing	Rebecca Hall and Nella Larsen
2021	The Power of the Dog	Jane Campion
2021	The Tragedy of Macbeth	Joel Coen
2022	Women Talking	Sarah Polley
2022	Glass Onion: A Knives Out Mystery	Rian Johnson
2022	Living	Kazuo Ishiguro
2022	She Said	Rebecca Lenkiewicz
2022	Top Gun: Maverick	Peter Craig, Ehren Kruger, Justin Marks, Christopher McQuarrie, and Eric Warren Singer
2022	The Whale	Samuel D. Hunter
2023	American Fiction	Cord Jefferson
2023	All of Us Strangers	Andrew Haigh
2023	Killers of the Flower Moon	Eric Roth and Martin Scorsese
2023	Oppenheimer	Christopher Nolan
2023	Poor Things	Tony McNamara
2023	The Zone of Interest	Jonathan Glazer
