= Washington D.C. Area Film Critics Association Awards 2010 =

Annual US film awards ceremony

9th WAFCA Awards
- Date: December 6, 2010

Highlights
- Best Film: The Social Network
- Best Director: David Fincher for The Social Network
- Best Actor: Colin Firth
- Best Actress: Jennifer Lawrence

The 9th Washington D.C. Area Film Critics Association Awards were given out on December 6, 2010.

== Winners and nominees ==
Best Film

- The Social Network

- 127 Hours
- Black Swan
- Inception
- Toy Story 3

Best Director

- David Fincher – The Social Network

- Darren Aronofsky – Black Swan
- Danny Boyle – 127 Hours
- Joel Coen and Ethan Coen – True Grit
- Christopher Nolan – Inception

Best Actor

- Colin Firth – The King's Speech

- Jeff Bridges – True Grit
- Robert Duvall – Get Low
- Jesse Eisenberg – The Social Network
- James Franco – 127 Hours

Best Actress

- Jennifer Lawrence – Winter's Bone

- Annette Bening – The Kids Are All Right
- Anne Hathaway – Love & Other Drugs
- Nicole Kidman – Rabbit Hole
- Natalie Portman – Black Swan

Best Supporting Actor

- Christian Bale – The Fighter

- Andrew Garfield – The Social Network
- John Hawkes – Winter's Bone
- Sam Rockwell – Conviction
- Geoffrey Rush – The King's Speech

Best Supporting Actress

- Melissa Leo – The Fighter

- Amy Adams – The Fighter
- Helena Bonham Carter – The King's Speech
- Hailee Steinfeld – True Grit
- Jacki Weaver – Animal Kingdom

Best Adapted Screenplay

- The Social Network – Aaron Sorkin

- 127 Hours – Simon Beaufoy and Danny Boyle
- Toy Story 3 – Michael Arndt
- True Grit – Joel Coen and Ethan Coen
- Winter's Bone – Debra Granik and Anne Rosellini

Best Original Screenplay

- Inception – Christopher Nolan

- Another Year – Mike Leigh
- Black Swan – Mark Heyman, Andres Heinz, and John McLaughlin
- The Kids Are All Right – Lisa Cholodenko and Stuart Blumberg
- The King's Speech – David Seidler

Best Cast

- The Town

- The Fighter
- Inception
- The Kids Are All Right
- The Social Network

Best Animated Film

- Toy Story 3

- Despicable Me
- How to Train Your Dragon
- Shrek Forever After
- Tangled
- Megamind

Best Documentary Film

- Exit Through the Gift Shop

- Inside Job
- Restrepo
- The Tillman Story
- Waiting for "Superman"

Best Foreign Language Film

- Biutiful • Mexico

- The Girl with the Dragon Tattoo • Sweden
- I Am Love • Italy
- Mother • South Korea
- White Material • France

Best Art Direction

- Inception

- Alice in Wonderland
- Black Swan
- Harry Potter and the Deathly Hallows – Part 1
- True Grit

Best Cinematography

- Inception

- 127 Hours
- Black Swan
- The Social Network
- True Grit

Best Score

- Inception – Hans Zimmer

- 127 Hours – A. R. Rahman
- Black Swan – Clint Mansell
- The Social Network – Trent Reznor and Atticus Ross
- True Grit – Carter Burwell
