= San Diego Film Critics Society Award for Best Film =

Annual US film award

The San Diego Film Critics Society Award for Best Film (or Picture) is an award given by the San Diego Film Critics Society to honor the best film of the year.

== Winners ==
=== 1990s ===
Year	Winner	Director(s)
1996	Fargo	Joel Coen
1997	L.A. Confidential	Curtis Hanson
1998	Gods and Monsters	Bill Condon
1999	American Beauty	Sam Mendes

=== 2000s ===
Year	Winner	Director(s)
2000	Almost Famous	Cameron Crowe
2001	Ghost World	Terry Zwigoff
2002	Far from Heaven	Todd Haynes
2003	Dirty Pretty Things	Stephen Frears
2004	Vera Drake	Mike Leigh
2005	King Kong	Peter Jackson
2006	Letters from Iwo Jima	Clint Eastwood
2007	No Country for Old Men	Joel Coen and Ethan Coen
2008	Slumdog Millionaire	Danny Boyle
2009	Inglourious Basterds	Quentin Tarantino

=== 2010s ===
Year	Winner	Director(s)
2010	Winter's Bone	Debra Granik
2011	The Artist	Michel Hazanavicius
2012	Argo	Ben Affleck
2013	Her	Spike Jonze
2014	Nightcrawler	Dan Gilroy
2015	Mad Max: Fury Road	George Miller
2016	Hell or High Water	David Mackenzie
2017	Get Out	Jordan Peele
2018	Leave No Trace	Debra Granik
2019	The Irishman	Martin Scorsese

=== 2020s ===
Year	Winner	Director(s)
2020	Promising Young Woman	Emerald Fennell
2021	The Power of The Dog	Jane Campion
2022	The Banshees of Inisherin	Martin McDonagh
2023	Are You There God? It's Me, Margaret	Kelly Fremon Craig
2024	Sing Sing	Greg Kwedar
2025	Sinners	Ryan Coogler
