= Alliance of Women Film Journalists Award for Best Woman Director =

The Alliance of Women Film Journalists Award for Best Woman Director is an annual award given by the Alliance of Women Film Journalists. The award is often referred to as an EDA as a tribute to AWFJ founder Jennifer Merin's mother, actress Eda Reiss Merin. EDA is also an acronym for Excellent Dynamic Activism.

== Winners ==
- "†" indicates Academy Award-winning direction.
- "‡" indicates Academy Award-nominated direction.

=== 2000s ===
Year	Director(s)	Film
2007	Sarah Polley	Away from Her
2007	Tamara Jenkins	The Savages
2007	Kasi Lemmons	Talk to Me
2007	Mira Nair	The Namesake
2008	Courtney Hunt	Frozen River
2008	Isabel Coixet	Elegy
2008	Kimberly Peirce	Stop-Loss
2008	Kelly Reichardt	Wendy and Lucy
2009	Kathryn Bigelow †	The Hurt Locker
2009	Jane Campion	Bright Star
2009	Lone Scherfig	An Education

=== 2010s ===
Year	Director(s)	Film
2010	Debra Granik	Winter's Bone
2010	Andrea Arnold	Fish Tank
2010	Lisa Cholodenko	The Kids Are All Right
2010	Sofia Coppola	Somewhere
2010	Nicole Holofcener	Please Give
2011	Lynne Ramsay	We Need to Talk About Kevin
2011	Dee Rees	Pariah
2011	Vera Farmiga	Higher Ground
2011	Kelly Reichardt	Meek’s Cutoff
2011	Jennifer Yuh	Kung Fu Panda 2
2012	Kathryn Bigelow	Zero Dark Thirty
2012	Andrea Arnold	Wuthering Heights
2012	Sarah Polley	Take This Waltz
2013	Nicole Holofcener	Enough Said
2013	Lake Bell	In a World...
2013	Gabriele Cowperthwaite	Blackfish
2013	Jennifer Lee	Frozen
2013	Sarah Polley	Stories We Tell
2014	Ava DuVernay	Selma
2014	Jennifer Kent	The Babadook
2014	Laura Poitras	Citizenfour
2015	Marielle Heller	The Diary of a Teenage Girl
2015	Isabel Coixet	Learning to Drive
2015	Maya Forbes	Infinitely Polar Bear
2015	Sarah Gavron	Suffragette
2015	Céline Sciamma	Girlhood
2016	Ava DuVernay	13th
2016	Andrea Arnold	American Honey
2016	Rebecca Miller	Maggie's Plan
2016	Mira Nair	Queen of Katwe
2016	Kelly Reichardt	Certain Women
2017	Greta Gerwig ‡	Lady Bird
2017	Kathryn Bigelow	Detroit
2017	Patty Jenkins	Wonder Woman
2017	Angelina Jolie	First They Killed My Father
2017	Dee Rees	Mudbound
2017	Angela Robinson	Professor Marston and the Wonder Women
2017	Agnès Varda	Faces Places
2018	Marielle Heller	Can You Ever Forgive Me?
2018	Elizabeth Chomko	What They Had
2018	Debra Granik	Leave No Trace
2018	Tamara Jenkins	Private Life
2018	Karyn Kusama	Destroyer
2018	Nadine Labaki	Capernaum
2018	Rungano Nyoni	I Am Not a Witch
2018	Sally Potter	The Party
2018	Lynne Ramsay	You Were Never Really Here
2018	Chloé Zhao	The Rider
2019	Céline Sciamma	Portrait of a Lady on Fire
2019	Greta Gerwig	Little Women
2019	Marielle Heller	A Beautiful Day in the Neighborhood
2019	Lulu Wang	The Farewell
2019	Olivia Wilde	Booksmart

=== 2020s ===
Year	Director(s)	Film
2020	Emerald Fennell ‡	Promising Young Woman
2020	Eliza Hittman	Never Rarely Sometimes Always
2020	Regina King	One Night in Miami...
2020	Channing Godfrey Peoples	Miss Juneteenth
2020	Kelly Reichardt	First Cow
2020	Chloé Zhao †	Nomadland

== See also ==
- List of media awards honoring women
