= San Diego Film Critics Society Awards 2010 =

Annual US film awards ceremony

15th SDFCS Awards

December 14, 2010

Best Film:
Winter's Bone

Best Director:
Darren Aronofsky
Black Swan

The 15th San Diego Film Critics Society Awards were announced on December 14, 2010.

== Winners and nominees ==
=== Best Actor ===
Colin Farrell – Ondine

- Aaron Eckhart – Rabbit Hole
- Jesse Eisenberg – The Social Network
- Colin Firth – The King's Speech
- James Franco – 127 Hours

=== Best Actress ===
Jennifer Lawrence – Winter's Bone

- Carey Mulligan – Never Let Me Go
- Natalie Portman – Black Swan
- Tilda Swinton – I Am Love
- Michelle Williams – Blue Valentine

=== Best Animated Film ===
Toy Story 3

- Despicable Me
- How to Train Your Dragon
- The Illusionist
- Tangled

=== Best Cinematography ===
Inception – Wally Pfister

- 127 Hours – Anthony Dod Mantle and Enrique Chediak
- Black Swan – Matthew Libatique
- Harry Potter and the Deathly Hallows –Part 1 – Eduardo Serra
- Shutter Island – Robert Richardson

=== Best Director ===
Darren Aronofsky – Black Swan

- Danny Boyle – 127 Hours
- David Fincher – The Social Network
- Debra Granik – Winter's Bone
- Christopher Nolan – Inception

=== Best Documentary ===
Exit Through the Gift Shop

- A Film Unfinished
- Inside Job
- The Tillman Story
- Waiting for "Superman"

=== Best Editing ===
Scott Pilgrim vs. the World – Jonathan Amos and Paul Machliss

- 127 Hours – Jon Harris
- Black Swan – Andrew Weisblum
- Inception – Lee Smith
- The Social Network – Angus Wall and Kirk Baxter

=== Best Ensemble Performance ===
44 Inch Chest

- Another Year
- The Fighter
- The Social Network
- Winter's Bone

=== Best Film ===
Winter's Bone

- Black Swan
- The Fighter
- Inception
- The King's Speech
- The Social Network

=== Best Foreign Language Film ===
I Am Love (Io sono l'amore) • Italy

- Biutiful • Mexico
- The Girl with the Dragon Tattoo (Män som hatar kvinnor) • Sweden
- Mother (Madeo) • South Korea
- No One Knows About Persian Cats (Kasi az gorbehaye irani khabar nadareh) • Iran

=== Best Production Design ===
Shutter Island – Dante Ferretti

- Alice in Wonderland – Robert Stromberg
- Black Swan – Therese De Prez
- Harry Potter and the Deathly Hallows – Part 1 – Stuart Craig
- Inception – Guy Hendrix Dyas

=== Best Score ===
Never Let Me Go – Rachel Portman

- 127 Hours – A. R. Rahman
- Alice in Wonderland – Danny Elfman
- Black Swan – Clint Mansell
- The Social Network – Trent Reznor and Atticus Ross

=== Best Original Screenplay ===
Four Lions – Chris Morris, Jesse Armstrong and Sam Bain

- Inception – Christopher Nolan
- The King's Speech – David Seidler
- Ondine – Neil Jordan
- Toy Story 3 – Michael Arndt

=== Best Adapted Screenplay ===
The Social Network – Aaron Sorkin

- Scott Pilgrim vs. the World – Edgar Wright and Michael Bacall
- Shutter Island – Laeta Kalogridis
- The Town – Ben Affleck, Peter Craig and Aaron Stockard
- Winter's Bone – Debra Granik and Anne Rosellini

=== Best Supporting Actor ===
John Hawkes – Winter's Bone

- Christian Bale – The Fighter
- John Hurt – 44 Inch Chest
- Jeremy Renner – The Town
- Geoffrey Rush – The King's Speech

=== Best Supporting Actress ===
Lesley Manville – Another Year

- Dale Dickey – Winter's Bone
- Melissa Leo – The Fighter
- Blake Lively – The Town
- Jacki Weaver – Animal Kingdom

=== Body of Work ===
Rebecca Hall – Red Riding 1974, Please Give and The Town
