= San Diego Film Critics Society Awards 2018 =

Annual US film awards ceremony

The 23rd San Diego Film Critics Society Awards were announced on December 10, 2018.

== Winners and nominees ==
=== Best Film ===
Leave No Trace

- The Ballad of Buster Scruggs
- The Favourite
- Green Book
- A Quiet Place

=== Best Director ===
Debra Granik – Leave No Trace

- Bo Burnham – Eighth Grade
- Peter Farrelly – Green Book
- John Krasinski – A Quiet Place
- Yorgos Lanthimos – The Favourite

=== Best Male Actor ===
Ethan Hawke – First Reformed

- Christian Bale – Vice
- Lucas Hedges – Boy Erased
- Viggo Mortensen – Green Book
- John C. Reilly – The Sisters Brothers

=== Best Female Actor ===
Glenn Close – The Wife

- Elsie Fisher – Eighth Grade
- Lady Gaga – A Star Is Born
- Melissa McCarthy – Can You Ever Forgive Me?
- Carey Mulligan – Wildlife

=== Best Male Supporting Actor ===
Timothée Chalamet – Beautiful Boy (TIE)
Richard E. Grant – Can You Ever Forgive Me? (TIE)

- Mahershala Ali – Green Book
- Joel Edgerton – Boy Erased
- Sam Elliott – A Star Is Born

=== Best Female Supporting Actor ===
Nicole Kidman – Boy Erased

- Nina Arianda – Stan & Ollie
- Zoe Kazan – The Ballad of Buster Scruggs
- Thomasin McKenzie – Leave No Trace
- Alia Shawkat – Blaze

=== Best Comedic Performance ===
Hugh Grant – Paddington 2

- Awkwafina – Crazy Rich Asians
- Jason Bateman – Game Night
- Jesse Plemons – Game Night
- Ryan Reynolds – Deadpool 2

=== Best Original Screenplay ===
Bo Burnham – Eighth Grade

- Wes Anderson – Isle of Dogs
- Scott Beck, John Krasinski, and Bryan Woods – A Quiet Place
- Joel Coen and Ethan Coen – The Ballad of Buster Scruggs
- Brian Hayes Currie, Peter Farrelly, and Nick Vallelonga – Green Book

=== Best Adapted Screenplay ===
Peter Fellows, Armando Iannucci, Ian Martin, Fabien Nury, and David Schneider – The Death of Stalin

- Joel Edgerton – Boy Erased
- Debra Granik and Anne Rosellini – Leave No Trace
- Nicole Holofcener and Jeff Whitty – Can You Ever Forgive Me?
- David Lowery – The Old Man & the Gun

=== Best Animated Film ===
Isle of Dogs

- Have a Nice Day
- Incredibles 2
- Ralph Breaks the Internet
- Spider-Man: Into the Spider-Verse

=== Best Documentary ===
Three Identical Strangers

- Free Solo
- Love, Gilda
- RBG
- Won't You Be My Neighbor?

=== Best Foreign Language Film ===
Shoplifters

- Capernaum
- Cold War
- The Guilty
- Roma

=== Best Cinematography ===
Bruno Delbonnel – The Ballad of Buster Scruggs (TIE)
Joshua James Richards – The Rider (TIE)

- Alfonso Cuarón – Roma
- Alexander Dynan – First Reformed
- Magnus Nordenhof Jønck – Lean on Pete

=== Best Costume Design ===
Sandy Powell – The Favourite (TIE)
Lindy Hemming – Paddington 2 (TIE)

- Guy Speranza – Stan & Ollie
- Mary E. Vogt – Crazy Rich Asians
- Mary Zophres – The Ballad of Buster Scruggs

=== Best Editing ===
Jamie Gross and Dave Egan – Game Night

- Roderick Jaynes – The Ballad of Buster Scruggs
- Yorgos Mavropsaridis – The Favourite
- Christopher Tellefsen – A Quiet Place
- Patrick J. Don Vito – Green Book

=== Best Production Design ===
Fiona Crombie – The Favourite

- Hannah Beachler – Black Panther
- Tim Galvin – Green Book
- John Paul Kelly – Stan & Ollie
- Adam Stockhausen – Ready Player One

=== Best Visual Effects ===
Ready Player One

- Black Panther
- Christopher Robin
- Isle of Dogs
- Paddington 2

=== Best Use of Music in a Film ===
Bad Times at the El Royale

- Blaze
- Bohemian Rhapsody
- Green Book
- A Star Is Born

=== Best Breakout Artist ===
Thomasin McKenzie – Leave No Trace

- Bo Burnham – Eighth Grade
- Elsie Fisher – Eighth Grade
- Rami Malek – Bohemian Rhapsody
- Charlie Plummer – Lean on Pete

=== Best Ensemble ===
Game Night

- The Ballad of Buster Scruggs
- Boy Erased
- The Favourite
- Green Book

=== Best Body of Work ===
John C. Reilly for Ralph Breaks the Internet, The Sisters Brothers, and Stan & Ollie
