= Alix Madigan =

American film producer

Alix Madigan is an American film producer known for her work on the 2010 film Winter's Bone, for which she was nominated for an Academy Award.

== Career ==
Madigan's first production credit was for Sunday in 1997, which won the Sundance Film Festival Grand Jury prize for Best Film.

For her work on the 2010 film, Winter's Bone, Madigan, with co-producer Anne Rosellini and director Debra Granik, received the Gotham Award for Best Feature. The film also earned her nominations for the Academy Award for Best Picture.

In 2018, In 2018, Alix Madigan produced the Lebanese film 1982 alongside Oualid Mouaness, Myriam Sassine, Georges Schoucair and Christopher Tricarico. The film was Lebanon's 2019 submission to the Academy Awards. The film also won the NETPAC Award for World or International Asian Film Premiere at the Toronto Film Festival.

Madigan has worked with Anonymous Content, Propaganda Films, Skouras Pictures, and Avenue Entertainment. She now runs her own independent production company entitled Mad Dog Films.

== Background ==
Alix Madigan was born and raised in New York City. She graduated from Dartmouth College and Wharton School of the University of Pennsylvania, and received her master's degree in business at the latter. She is married to David Yorkin, with whom she has two children. They live in California.

== Filmography ==
- Sunday (1997) - producer
- Your Friends & Neighbors (1998) - executive producer
- Smiley Face (2007) - producer
- Cleaner (2007) - producer
- Married Life (2007) - executive producer
- Case 39 (2009) - co-producer
- Winter's Bone (2010) - producer
- Girl Most Likely (2012) - producer
- May in the Summer (2013) - producer
- Laggies (2014) - producer
- White Bird in a Blizzard (2014) - producer
- The Automatic Hate (2015) - producer
- The Age of Adaline (2015) - executive producer
- It Happened in L.A. (2017) - producer
- All I Wish (2017) - executive producer
- Spinning Man (2018) - executive producer
- The Lie (2018) - producer
- 1982 (2019) - producer
- Hold Your Breath (2024) - producer
- Hurricanna (2025) - producer
