= Chicago Film Critics Association Awards 2010 =

Annual US film awards ceremony

23rd CFCA Awards

December 20, 2010

Best Film:
The Social Network

The 23rd Chicago Film Critics Association Awards, honoring the best in film for 2010, were announced on December 20, 2010.

== Winners and nominees ==
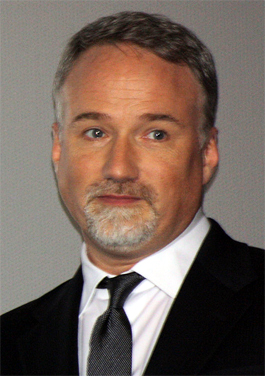
David Fincher, Best Director winner

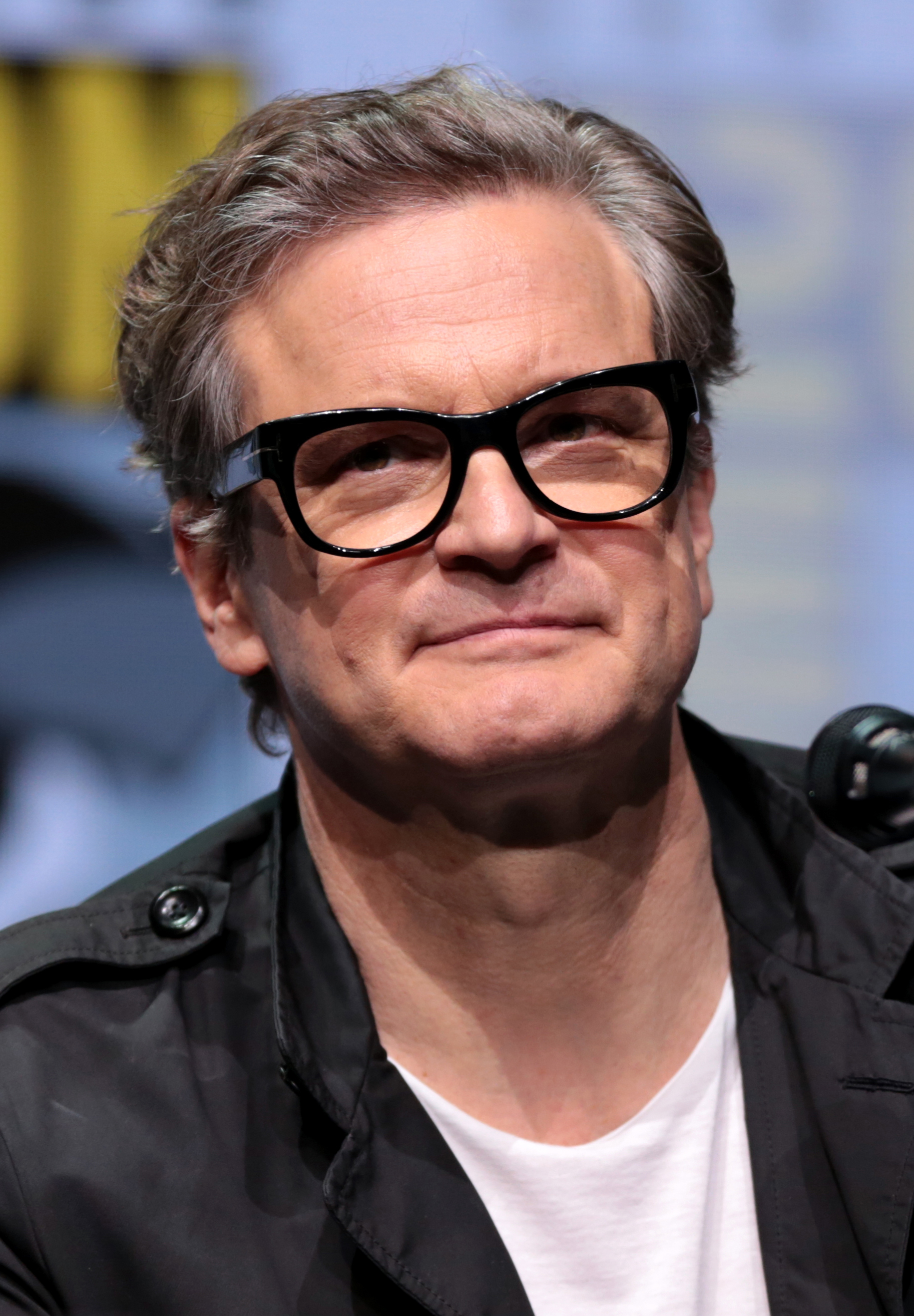
Colin Firth, Best Actor winner

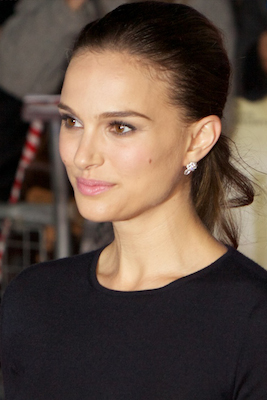
Natalie Portman, Best Actress winner

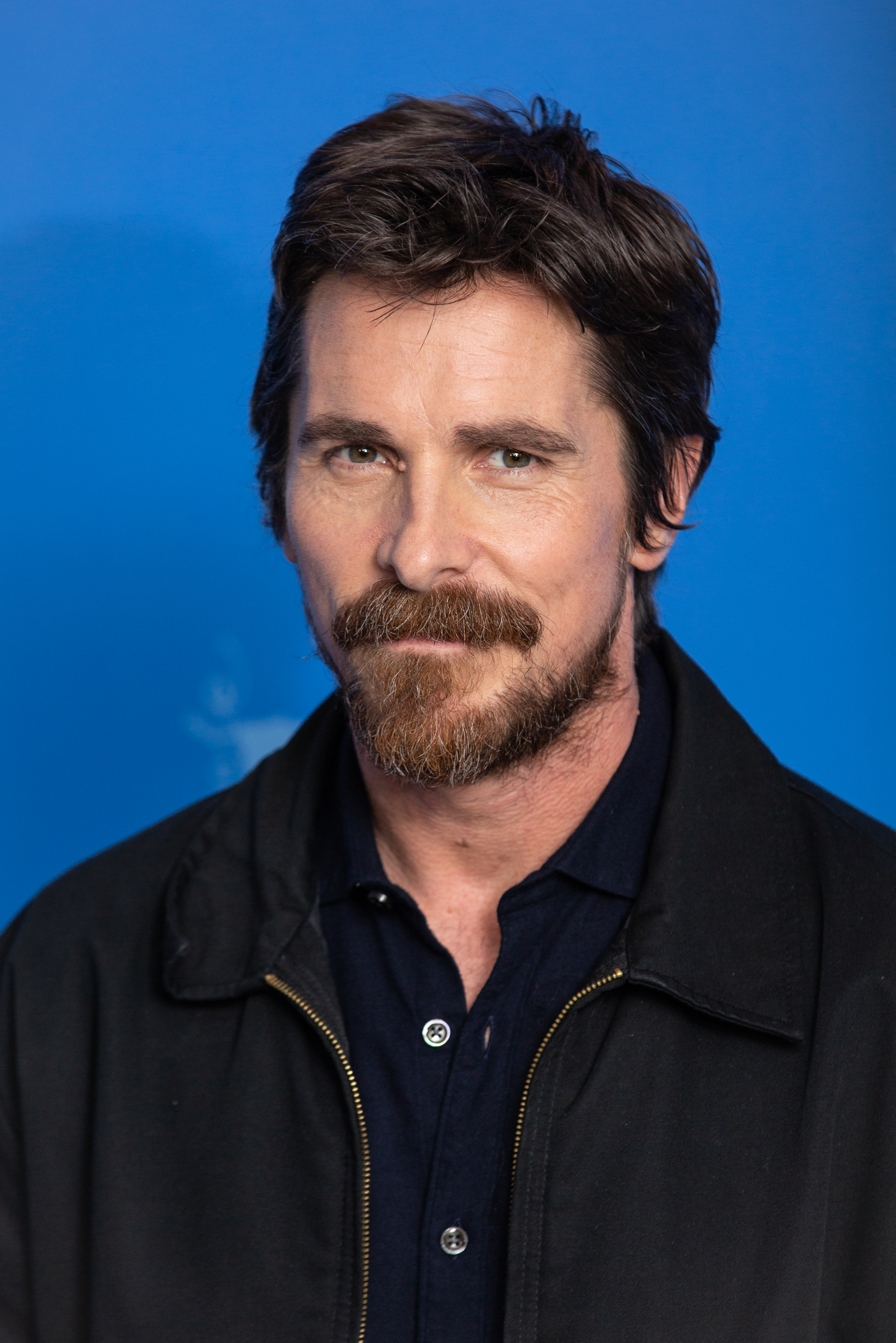
Christian Bale, Best Supporting Actor winner

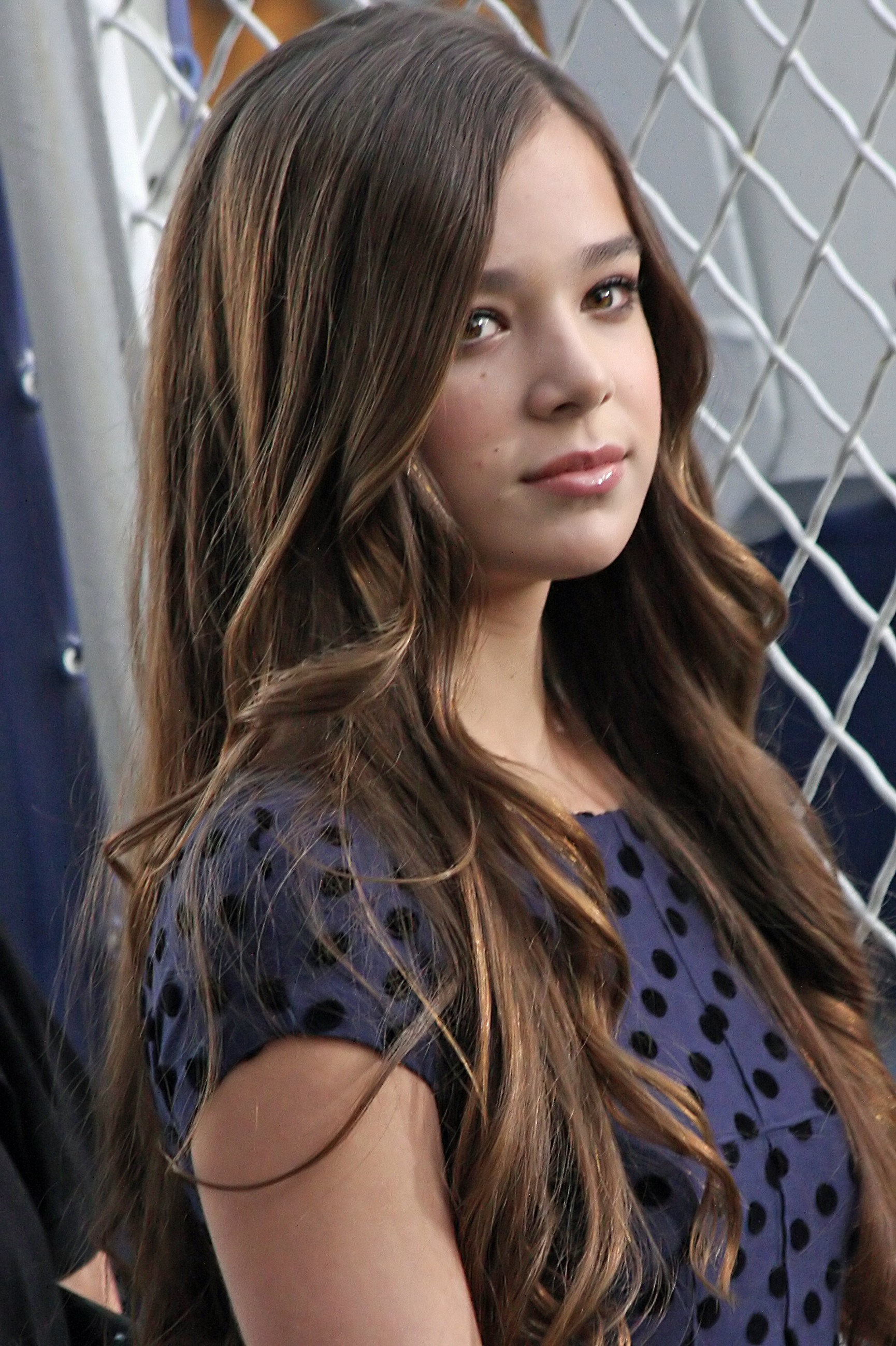
Hailee Steinfeld, Best Supporting Actress winner

=== Best Actor ===
Colin Firth – The King's Speech

- Jeff Bridges – True Grit
- Jesse Eisenberg – The Social Network
- James Franco – 127 Hours
- Ryan Gosling – Blue Valentine

=== Best Actress ===
Natalie Portman – Black Swan

- Annette Bening – The Kids Are All Right
- Jennifer Lawrence – Winter's Bone
- Lesley Manville – Another Year
- Michelle Williams – Blue Valentine

=== Best Animated Film ===
Toy Story 3

- Despicable Me
- How to Train Your Dragon
- The Illusionist
- Tangled

=== Best Cinematography ===
Inception – Wally Pfister

- Black Swan – Matthew Libatique
- Shutter Island – Robert Richardson
- The Social Network – Jeff Cronenweth
- True Grit – Roger Deakins

=== Best Director ===
David Fincher – The Social Network

- Darren Aronofsky – Black Swan
- Debra Granik – Winter's Bone
- Tom Hooper – The King's Speech
- Christopher Nolan – Inception

=== Best Documentary Film ===
Exit Through the Gift Shop

- Inside Job
- Restrepo
- The Tillman Story
- Waiting for "Superman"

=== Best Film ===
The Social Network

- Black Swan
- Inception
- The King's Speech
- Winter's Bone

=== Best Foreign Language Film ===
A Prophet, France

- Biutiful, Mexico
- The Girl with the Dragon Tattoo, Sweden
- I Am Love, Italy
- Mother, South Korea

=== Best Original Score ===
Black Swan – Clint Mansell

- I Am Love – John Adams
- Inception – Hans Zimmer
- The Social Network – Trent Reznor and Atticus Ross
- True Grit – Carter Burwell

=== Best Screenplay – Adapted ===
The Social Network – Aaron Sorkin

- Rabbit Hole – David Lindsay-Abaire
- Toy Story 3 – Michael Arndt
- True Grit – Joel Coen and Ethan Coen
- Winter's Bone – Debra Granik and Anne Rosellini

=== Best Screenplay – Original ===
Inception – Christopher Nolan

- Black Swan – Mark Heyman, Andres Heinz and John McLaughlin
- Four Lions – Chris Morris, Jesse Armstrong, and Sam Bain
- The Kids Are All Right – Lisa Cholodenko and Stuart Blumberg
- The King's Speech – David Seidler

=== Best Supporting Actor ===
Christian Bale – The Fighter

- Andrew Garfield – The Social Network
- John Hawkes – Winter's Bone
- Mark Ruffalo – The Kids Are All Right
- Geoffrey Rush – The King's Speech

=== Best Supporting Actress ===
Hailee Steinfeld – True Grit

- Amy Adams – The Fighter
- Helena Bonham Carter – The King's Speech
- Melissa Leo – The Fighter
- Jacki Weaver – Animal Kingdom

=== Most Promising Filmmaker ===
Derek Cianfrance – Blue Valentine

- Banksy – Exit Through the Gift Shop
- David Michôd – Animal Kingdom
- Aaron Schneider – Get Low
- John Wells – The Company Men

=== Most Promising Performer ===
Jennifer Lawrence – Winter's Bone

- Armie Hammer – The Social Network
- Katie Jarvis – Fish Tank
- Tahar Rahim – A Prophet
- Hailee Steinfeld – True Grit
