= Peter Rock =

Peter Rock may refer to:

- Peter Rock (footballer) (1941–2021), East German footballer
- Peter Rock (musician) (1945–2016), Chilean rock and roll musician
- Peter Rock (novelist) (born 1967), American novelist

== See also ==
- Pete Rock (born 1970), American record producer, DJ, and rapper
