= Leave No Trace (film) =

2018 film directed by Debra Granik

- Theatrical release poster
- Directed by: Debra Granik
- Screenplay by: Debra Granik; Anne Rosellini
- Based on: My Abandonment by Peter Rock
- Produced by: Anne Harrison; Linda Reisman; Anne Rosellini
- Starring: Ben Foster; Thomasin McKenzie; Jeff Kober; Dale Dickey
- Cinematography: Michael McDonough
- Edited by: Jane Rizzo
- Music by: Dickon Hinchliffe
- Production companies: Bron Creative; Topic Studios; Harrison Productions; Reisman Productions; Still Rolling Productions
- Distributed by: Bleecker Street (United States); Sony Pictures Releasing International; Stage 6 Films (International)
- Release dates: January 20, 2018 (Sundance); June 29, 2018 (United States)
- Running time: 109 minutes
- Country: United States
- Language: English
- Box office: $7.7 million

Leave No Trace is a 2018 American drama film directed by Debra Granik. The film is written by Granik and Anne Rosellini, based on Peter Rock's 2009 novel My Abandonment, which is loosely based on a true story. The plot follows a military veteran father (Ben Foster) with post-traumatic stress disorder who lives in the forest with his young daughter (Thomasin McKenzie).

Leave No Trace premiered at the 2018 Sundance Film Festival, and was theatrically released by Bleecker Street in the United States on June 29, 2018. It is the most reviewed film to hold a 100% rating on Rotten Tomatoes.

== Plot ==
Will, a veteran suffering from PTSD, lives with his teenage daughter Tom in the old growth Forest Park in Portland, Oregon. They live in isolation, relying on survival skills and only entering the town occasionally for supplies. Will makes money by selling his Veterans Health Administration-issued benzodiazepines to another homeless veteran.

After Tom is spotted in the woods by a jogger, the father and daughter duo are arrested by park rangers and detained by social services. They are assessed and Tom is found to be educationally advanced for her age despite not attending school. They find a house to live in on a Christmas tree farm in rural Oregon in exchange for Will's work on the farm. Will begrudgingly begins work packaging trees, but is bothered by the helicopters used to move them. Tom meets a local boy who is building his own tiny house, who introduces her to the local 4-H youth club. Social services continue to check on Will and Tom and require constant form filling.

One morning, Will suddenly decides to leave. Tom follows reluctantly. The pair return to their camp in the park, but find it destroyed. Will and Tom try to travel in a railroad boxcar but eventually catch a ride with a trucker who takes them to Washington state. After being dropped off, at a remote forest area, they build a temporary shelter for the night. The next day they discover a vacant cabin and move in. Will leaves to find food but does not return. The next morning, Tom discovers him unconscious at the bottom of a ravine with a seriously injured foot.

Tom gets help from local quadbikers, who take them to their mobile home community. Tom refuses to let Will be taken to a hospital. Dale, a local woman, calls a friend who is a former Army medic to treat Will's injury. Will and Tom are given an empty trailer in the community while he recovers. The medic also has PTSD and lends his service dog to help Will with his nightmares. A local teaches Tom about beehives. Tom likes their new home and tries to make a rental agreement with Dale, the trailer's owner, without telling Will. Eventually, Will insists that he and Tom leave. Tom protests, telling him "the same thing that's wrong with you isn't wrong with me".

After leaving the RV community, Tom stops and says to Will, "I know you would stay if you could". They tearfully hug and part ways. Tom returns to the trailer community, and Will returns to the woods. Later, Tom hangs a food package in the forest.

== Cast ==
- Ben Foster as Will, a military veteran suffering from PTSD
- Thomasin McKenzie as Tom, Will's daughter
- Jeff Kober as Mr. Walters, a tree farm owner
- Dale Dickey as Dale, the owner of the trailer park
- Dana Millican as Jean Bauer, Tom's social worker
- Michael Prosser as James, Will's social worker
- Derek John Drescher as Larry, a man with whom Will exchanges medications for money
- Isaiah Stone as Isaiah, a person whom Tom befriends

== Production ==
The film was directed by Debra Granik and written by Granik and Anne Rosellini, based on the 2009 novel My Abandonment by Peter Rock. The novel is loosely based on a true story.

=== Filming ===
Principal photography took place during the spring of 2017 in Portland, Oregon. Eagle Fern Park in Clackamas County was used for the main forest scenes.

== Soundtrack ==
Dickon Hinchliffe, formerly of Tindersticks, composed the film score, released digitally by Lakeshore Records. This is his second collaboration with Granik, after Winter's Bone.

Off-grid musician and former Dream Syndicate and Opal member Kendra Smith contributed the original song "Moon Boat" (her first solo recording since 1996), which plays over the end credits.

Oregon folk musicians Michael Hurley and Marisa Anderson have cameo performances in the film.

== Release ==
The film had its world premiere at the Sundance Film Festival on January 20, 2018. Shortly after, Bleecker Street acquired U.S. distribution rights to the film. It was released on June 29, 2018.

== Reception ==
=== Critical response ===
On Rotten Tomatoes, the film has an approval rating of 100% based on 248 reviews, with an average rating of 8.6/10. The website's critical consensus reads, "Leave No Trace takes an effectively low-key approach to a potentially sensationalistic story — and further benefits from brilliant work by Ben Foster and Thomasin McKenzie." It is the most reviewed film to hold an approval rating of 100% on the site. On Metacritic, the film has a weighted average score of 88 out of 100, based on 44 critics, indicating "universal acclaim".

Manohla Dargis of The New York Times wrote: "In its best moments, Leave No Trace invites you to simply be with its characters, to see and experience the world as they do. Empathy, the movie reminds you, is something that is too little asked of you either in life or in art. Both Mr. Foster’s and Ms. Harcourt McKenzie’s sensitive, tightly checked performances are critical in this regard." Kenneth Turan of the Los Angeles Times called it "Fiercely involving in a way we're not used to, made with sensitivity and honesty by director/co-writer Debra Granik, it tells its emotional story of a father and daughter living dangerously off the grid in a way that is unnerving and uncompromising yet completely satisfying." The Guardian critic Peter Bradshaw praised the movie as being a deeply intelligent story of love and survival in the wild, and gave it a perfect score of 5 out of 5. Mark Kermode and former US President Barack Obama named Leave No Trace their favorite film of 2018.

Peter Debruge of Variety gave the film a mixed review: "There's a listless, almost meandering nature to the story. The film's conflict is clear – this is no way to raise a child, and allowed to continue in this fashion, Will risks both his life and Tom's – and yet there’s no sense of where the script is headed, and no urgency to its resolution."

=== Accolades ===
==== Top ten lists ====
Leave No Trace was listed on numerous critics' top ten lists for 2018, among them:

- 1st - Mark Kermode, The Observer
- 1st - Kenneth Turan, Los Angeles Times (tied with Black Panther)
- 2nd - Stephen Farber, The Hollywood Reporter
- 2nd - Richard Lawson, Vanity Fair
- 2nd - David Morgan, CBS News
- 2nd - Staff consensus, The Guardian
- 3rd - Jason Bailey, Flavorwire
- 4th - Richard Roeper, Chicago Sun-Times
- 4th - Peter Bradshaw, The Guardian
- 4th - Sara Stewart, New York Post
- 5th - Sheri Linden, The Hollywood Reporter
- 5th - David Sims, The Atlantic
- 5th - Lawrence Toppman, The Charlotte Observer
- 5th - Staff consensus, The Sydney Morning Herald
- 6th - Anita Katz, San Francisco Examiner
- 6th - John Frosch, The Hollywood Reporter
- 6th - Randy Myers, San Jose Mercury News
- 6th - Chris Wasser, Irish Independent
- 8th - Nicholas Barber, BBC Culture
- 8th - Peter Rainer, Christian Science Monitor
- 8th - Marc Doyle, Metacritic
- 8th - Caryn James, The Hollywood Reporter
- 9th - John Powers, Vogue
- 10th - David Edelstein, Vulture
- 10th - Josh Larsen, Filmspotting
- Top 10 (listed alphabetically) - Dana Stevens, Slate

Former President Barack Obama named the film one of his favorite movies of 2018.

==== Awards and nominations ====
Award	Date of ceremony	Category	Recipients	Result	Ref.
Gotham Awards	November 26, 2018	Best Actor	Ben Foster	Nominated	
Gotham Awards	November 26, 2018	Breakthrough Actor	Thomasin McKenzie	Nominated	
Detroit Film Critics Society	December 3, 2018	Best Supporting Actress	Thomasin McKenzie	Nominated	
National Board of Review	January 8, 2019	Breakthrough Performance	Thomasin McKenzie	Won	
National Board of Review	January 8, 2019	Top Ten Independent Films	Leave No Trace	Won	
Los Angeles Film Critics Association	December 9, 2018	Best Director	Debra Granik	Won	
Los Angeles Film Critics Association	December 9, 2018	Best Actor	Ben Foster	Runner-up	
Critics' Choice Movie Awards	January 13, 2019	Best Young Performer	Thomasin McKenzie	Nominated	
Satellite Awards	February 17, 2019	Best Actor in a Motion Picture, Drama	Ben Foster	Nominated	
Satellite Awards	February 17, 2019	Best Adapted Screenplay	Debra Granik and Anne Rosellini	Nominated	
Satellite Awards	February 17, 2019	Best Independent Film	Leave No Trace	Nominated	
Independent Spirit Awards	February 23, 2019	Best Feature	Anne Harrison, Linda Reisman and Anne Rosellini	Nominated	
Independent Spirit Awards	February 23, 2019	Best Director	Debra Granik	Nominated	
Independent Spirit Awards	February 23, 2019	Best Supporting Female	Thomasin McKenzie	Nominated	
San Diego Film Critics Society	December 10, 2018	Best Picture	Leave No Trace	Won	
San Diego Film Critics Society	December 10, 2018	Breakthrough Artist	Thomasin McKenzie	Won	
San Diego Film Critics Society	December 10, 2018	Best Director	Debra Granik	Won	
USC Scripter Award	February 9, 2019		Debra Granik, Anne Rosellini and Peter Rock	Won	

== See also ==
- List of films with a 100% rating on Rotten Tomatoes
