= Littlerock (film) =

- Directed by: Mike Ott
- Written by: Mike Ott; Atsuko Okatsuka; Carl McLaughlin
- Cinematography: Carl McLaughlin
- Edited by: David Nordstrom
- Release dates: April 23, 2010 (San Francisco International Film Festival); August 12, 2011 (United States)
- Running time: 83 minutes
- Country: United States
- Languages: English, Japanese

Littlerock is a 2010 film directed by Mike Ott. It debuted at the 2010 San Francisco International Film Festival, and played at over 40 film festivals including AFI Fest, Viennale, Cairo International Film Festival, Warsaw International Film Festival, Reykjavik International Film Festival, Thessaloniki International Film Festival, and Hong Kong International Film Festival before its U.S. theatrical release on August 12, 2011.

== Plot ==
While on a trip to the United States, a Japanese brother and sister are momentarily stranded in the small Southern California town of Littlerock. As the brother decides to go forward with the trip, his sister, who speaks no English at all, chooses to stay on for a while and get to know some of the local residents.

== Cast ==
- Atsuko Okatsuka as Atsuko Sakamoto
- Cory Zacharia as Cory Lawler
- Rintaro Sawamoto as Rintaro Sakamoto
- Roberto 'Sanz' Sanchez as Francisco Fumero
- Ryan Dillon as Brody
- Matthew Fling as Garbo
- Brett L. Tinnes as Jordan
- Markiss McFadden as Marques Wright
- Sean Neff as Sean Tippy

== Reception ==
The film was generally well received by critics. On Rotten Tomatoes it has an approval rating of 80% based on 25 reviews.

== Awards ==
=== Won ===
AFI Fest

- Best Feature Film (Audience Award)

Gotham Awards

- Best Film Not Playing at a Theater Near You

Independent Spirit Awards

- Someone to Watch Award - Mike Ott

Reykjavik International Film Festival

- Audience Award

Independent Film Festival of Boston

- Grand Jury Prize

San Diego Asian Film Festival

- Best Narrative Feature
