= Los Angeles Film Critics Association Award for Best Director =

Annual US film award

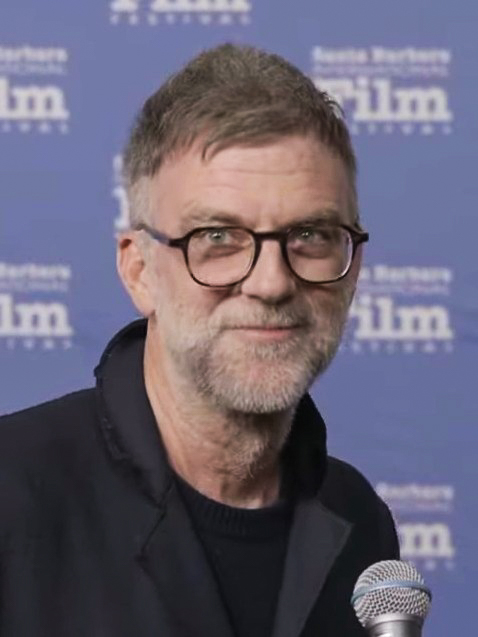
- Current recipient: Paul Thomas Anderson
- Country: United States
- Presented by: Los Angeles Film Critics Association
- First award: Sidney Lumet; Dog Day Afternoon (1975)
- Currently held by: Paul Thomas Anderson; One Battle After Another (2025)
- Website: lafca.net

This is the complete list of the winners of the Los Angeles Film Critics Association Award for Best Director given by the Los Angeles Film Critics Association.

== Winners ==
=== 1970s ===
Year	Winner	Film
1975	Sidney Lumet	Dog Day Afternoon
1976	Sidney Lumet	Network
1977	Herbert Ross	The Turning Point
1978	Michael Cimino	The Deer Hunter
1979	Robert Benton	Kramer vs. Kramer

=== 1980s ===
Year	Winner	Film
1980	Roman Polanski	Tess
1981	Warren Beatty	Reds
1982	Steven Spielberg	E.T. the Extra-Terrestrial
1983	James L. Brooks	Terms of Endearment
1984	Miloš Forman	Amadeus
1985	Terry Gilliam	Brazil
1986	David Lynch	Blue Velvet
1987	John Boorman	Hope and Glory
1988	David Cronenberg	Dead Ringers
1989	Spike Lee	Do the Right Thing

=== 1990s ===
Year	Winner	Film
1990	Martin Scorsese	Goodfellas
1991	Barry Levinson	Bugsy
1992	Clint Eastwood	Unforgiven
1993	Jane Campion	The Piano
1994	Quentin Tarantino	Pulp Fiction
1995	Mike Figgis	Leaving Las Vegas
1996	Mike Leigh	Secrets & Lies
1997	Curtis Hanson	L.A. Confidential
1998	Steven Spielberg	Saving Private Ryan
1999	Sam Mendes	American Beauty

=== 2000s ===
Year	Winner	Film
2000	Steven Soderbergh	Erin Brockovich
2000	Steven Soderbergh	Traffic
2001	David Lynch	Mulholland Drive
2002	Pedro Almodóvar	Talk to Her (Hable con ella)
2003	Peter Jackson	The Lord of the Rings: The Return of the King
2004	Alexander Payne	Sideways
2005	Ang Lee	Brokeback Mountain
2006	Paul Greengrass	United 93
2007	Paul Thomas Anderson	There Will Be Blood
2008	Danny Boyle	Slumdog Millionaire
2009	Kathryn Bigelow	The Hurt Locker

=== 2010s ===
Year	Winner	Film
2010	Olivier Assayas	Carlos
2010	David Fincher	The Social Network
2011	Terrence Malick	The Tree of Life
2012	Paul Thomas Anderson	The Master
2013	Alfonso Cuarón	Gravity
2014	Richard Linklater	Boyhood
2015	George Miller	Mad Max: Fury Road
2016	Barry Jenkins	Moonlight
2017	Guillermo del Toro	The Shape of Water
2017	Luca Guadagnino	Call Me by Your Name
2018	Debra Granik	Leave No Trace
2019	Bong Joon-ho	Parasite

=== 2020s ===
Year	Winner	Film
2020	Chloé Zhao	Nomadland
2021	Jane Campion	The Power of the Dog
2022	Todd Field	TÁR
2023	Jonathan Glazer	The Zone of Interest
2024	Mohammad Rasoulof	The Seed of the Sacred Fig
2025	Paul Thomas Anderson	One Battle After Another
