= Caridad de la Luz =

American actress and poet (born 1977)

- Born: January 21, 1977 (age 49); South Bronx, New York, U.S.
- Occupations: Poet, playwright, actress, activist
- Children: Two
- Writing career
- Pen name: La Bruja
- Notable works: Boogie Rican Blvd. (author & performer) 2002; For Witch It Stands (singer, songs & lyrics) 2010; Brujalicious (singer, songs & lyrics) 2011; The Poetician (author) 2012; Bru-Ha-Ha (author & performer) 2018
- Movement: Nuyorican Poets Café

Caridad de la Luz (born January 21, 1977), a.k.a. "La Bruja" (The "Good" Witch), is a Nuyorican (a New York-born Puerto Rican) poet, playwright, actress and activist. She is considered one of the leading spoken word poets in the world. In 2005, El Diario La Prensa, the largest Spanish-language newspaper in New York City, named De la Luz as one of the "Fifty Most Distinguished Latinas in the United States".

== Early years ==
De la Luz's parents moved to New York City from Puerto Rico. She was born, raised, and received her primary and secondary education in the South Bronx. As a child she was surrounded and influenced by the sounds of salsa music. The Bronx where she was raised is known as El Condado de la Salsa (Salsa County).

De la Luz started writing poems when she was three years old. Her great-grandmother, Adelaida Cataquet Montalvo, "the original poet" of the family, served as an influential factor in De la Luz's literature aspirations. On Thanksgiving and Christmas days, Adelaida would share with De la Luz a poem – then ask her to recite it back to the entire family.

De la Luz would often prepare shows for her family, imitating her favorite salsa singers Celia Cruz and Celina Gonzalez. She also enjoyed writing, especially poetry, and graduated with honors from Murry Bergtraum High School. She then studied literature and theater arts at SUNY Binghamton.

In 1992, while in college, De la Luz became a sister of the Omega Phi Beta Society and a chartering member of its Delta chapter in SUNY Binghamton.

From 1996 to 1998, De la Luz worked as a community organizer in the Hunts Point section of the Bronx: focusing on issues like drug abuse, dropout prevention, teenage pregnancy and AIDS. During those years, initially in poetic form, she began to formulate the characters who now inhabit her work.

== Debut: Boogie Rican Blvd. ==
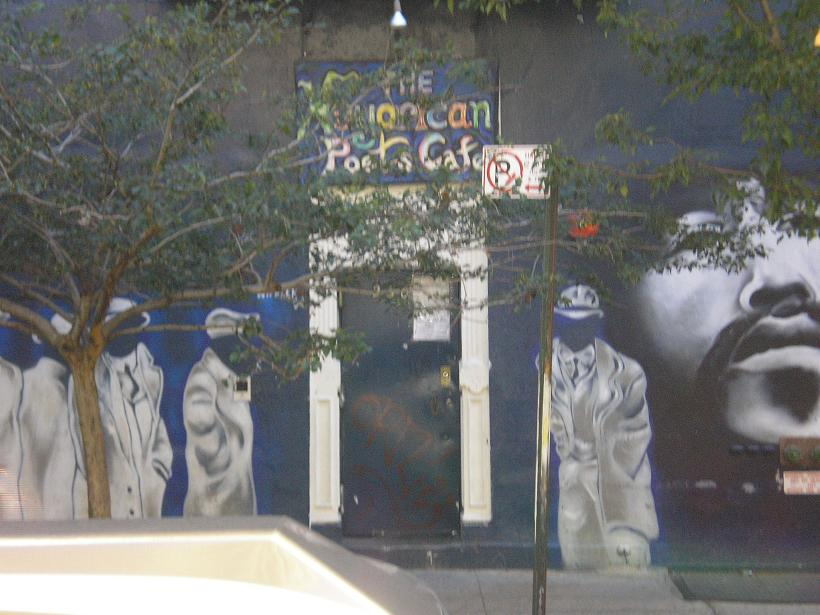
The Nuyorican Poets Cafe

De la Luz made her debut as an artist in 1996, when she first took the microphone at the Nuyorican Poets Café and received a standing ovation. The Nuyorican is a New York City art space: where some poets, writers and performance artists have gotten their first exposure to major live audiences.

Among those who have performed there are: Miguel Piñero, Pedro Pietri and Edwin Torres.

For several years at the Nuyorican Café, De la Luz developed and refined the many characters that ultimately gave life to her first theatrical production, Boogie Rican Blvd. The play traced the life of the multi-faceted Puerto Rican persona from the Bronx to Puerto Rico, as De la Luz blended her characters, poetry, photography and music into a dense, multi-layered, yet seamless narrative.

In October 2001, Boogie Rican Blvd. had its Off-Broadway debut at The Producers Club, and the show was a success. After the Producers Club, Boogie Rican Blvd. sold out an eight-week run at the LATEA Theater in New York, was featured prominently in the Nuyorican Poet's Cafe, and made a four-week run in the Puerto Rican Traveling Theater (PRTT) in 2009.

In its review of the PRTT production, The New York Times announced that De la Luz "is a juggernaut". In a second article, The Times noted that throughout the show, De la Luz portrayed seven different characters—two of them male—as well as singing, rapping and dancing. Backstage described De La Luz as "an actor whose power of impersonation recalls that of Whoopi Goldberg at her best. De La Luz, who is also the playwright, portrays six characters, each a different stereotype—the eccentric bodega owner, the Long Island wannabe, the hip-hop gangster—with a comic sensibility that is both affectionate and cutting."

In a press interview, the theater and film veteran Míriam Colón, who was also the founder and executive director of the Puerto Rican Traveling Theater, said this about De la Luz: "I was flabbergasted when I saw her performance...That is a gigantic undertaking that only the most skillful and experienced actresses dare to do...She interprets these very recognizable barrio types with a lot of compassion and tenderness."

De la Luz also toured internationally, presenting Boogie Rican Blvd. in cities throughout the United States, Europe and Latin America.

The casting and crew of Boogie Rican Blvd. reinforced the show's in-depth exploration of family relationships: since De La Luz's daughter played a leading role as "Papo," and De La Luz's son Kelson worked as a production assistant. Both Kelson and Carina are cast members of De La Luz's current show "Bru-Ha-Ha."

== Film and theater ==
External videos
- De la Luz as "Cuca", a pregnant and lonely teen poet: one of the seven characters she portrayed in Boogie Rican Blvd.

De la Luz was a dancer in the 1998 movie Dance with Me, starring Vanessa Williams and Chayanne.

De La Luz's other theater performances include Ubu Unchained, El Spanglish Language Sandwich by Pedro Pietri, and Women Like This, and a hip hop festival held in Switzerland.

In 2000, she made her feature film debut as "Cuca" in Spike Lee's Bamboozled.

In 2004, she played the role of "Lucy" in the film Down to the Bone. In 2005, she played a relentless girlfriend who uses witchcraft in the Spanish-language comedy El Vacilón – The Movie. The film was based on the highest-rated FM morning radio show, in all of New York City: El Vacilón de la Mañana, which airs daily on the La Mega-FM channel.

On Netflix, De la Luz and her music are both featured in the film Gun Gill Road.

External videos
- Finale of Boogie Rican Blvd., in New York's Puerto Rican Traveling Theater

In the History Channel's series Witch Hunt, she was cast as the mysterious "Tituba". She also played the lead in Danny Hastings' indie film comedy Venus de Macho.

HBO Latino recruited her for their series HABLA Women, and she is the voice of Roxy in MTV's animated comedy Lugar Heights.

De la Luz toured internationally with her show Boogie Rican Blvd. (playing seven different characters). She also toured Poland and New York in the musical Ubu Enchanted and was featured in Pedro Pietri's El Spanglish Language Sandwich.

As an ensemble member of the Pregones Theater since 2014, De la Luz has appeared and been featured in Betsy, The Red Rose, I Like It Like That, and Dancing In My Cockroach Killers.

In the Off-Broadway production of I Like It Like That, De la Luz starred in the role of "China Rodriguez", alongside salsa icons Tito Nieves and Domingo Quiñones. The show ran for five months.

In 2018, her one-woman show Bru-Ha-Ha was a sensual, scandalous and semi-autobiographical send-up of her own life showing how De la Luz's alter ego "La Bruja" (the witch) was born. Bru-Ha-Ha was noted for its colorful cast of characters (all played by De la Luz), unique music from the "Brujalicious Quintet", outrageous insights and breaking personal boundaries —a witch's brew which took the audience on "a ride of wonder, laughter and surprise".

In 2019, De la Luz starred in the role of "Sally" in the feature film Release.

== Poetry and writing ==
External videos
- Caridad De la Luz performs on HBO's Def Poetry Jam, hosted by Russell Simmons. She speaks her poems W.T.C. and Lola.

In addition to writing Boogie Rican Blvd. De la Luz's poetry, essays, and dramatic writing have been widely anthologized.

Voices in First Person, Reflections of Latina Identity; We Got Issues, A Feminist Perspective; Me No Hable with Acento, A Collection of Spanglish Poetry; and Breaking Ground/Abriendo Caminos, Anthology of Women Writers in N.Y. 1980-2012, have all published her writing. De la Luz also self-published The Poetician, a collection of 52 poems and lyrics.

After her 1996 spoken-word debut in the Nuyorican Poet's Café, De la Luz appeared on HBO's Def Poetry Jam, hosted by Russell Simmons. She also performed her poetry at the Apollo Theater, Lincoln Center, Gracie Mansion, the Joseph Papp Public Theater, Cathedral of St. John the Divine, City Hall in New York City, the American Museum of Natural History, the Bronx Museum of Art, El Museo del Barrio, and many international venues.

The content of De la Luz's poetry explores social justice and Nuyorican identity. Its tone is urban, raw, empowering, and is sought by inner-city communities and universities alike. Her best-known poem is WTC, which she wrote in the aftermath of the 9/11 attacks and performed on HBO's Def Poetry Jam in 2002. WTC consists entirely of three-word phrases using words beginning with those exact letters: W, T, C. It starts with "What’s the cause/Work to connect/Wish to change/Want to cry" and incorporates the refrain "Wish time could/Wash this clean".

Other poems by De la Luz have been published in magazines such as Shout, Vibe, Source, AWOL, Urban, and Stress. El Vocero and the El Centro Journal for Hunter College, have also published her poems.

== Radio and recording career ==
External videos
- Caridad De la Luz: Live at Summerstage 2015. She performs her original song Nuyorico and other classics, including Usted Abusó by Celia Cruz and Carbonero by La Lupe

De la Luz co-hosted the Say It with Sixto Show with her friend Sixto Ramos, on the Luis Jiménez Radio Network.

She was featured on Prince Royce's award-winning album Phase II and Bobby Sanabria's Grammy-nominated album Multiverse.

She wrote and recorded vocals with Afrika Bambaata, Fat Joe, Jadakiss, B-Real of Cypress Hill, Tony Touch, Vivian Green, Jungle Brothers, Dan Zanes, Hurricane G, Joell Ortiz, Chingo Bling, and Black Ice.

She released the album titled Brujalicious on her own record label, De La Luz Records, which blends a Latin-tinged hip hop with reggaeton. Her latest album, For Witch It Stands, is a popular selection on iTunes.

She also performed in radio and television commercials for McDonald's and Café Bustelo, and is a spokesmodel for Levis Jean's.

Currently De la Luz collaborates with composer/musician Desmar Guevara, choreographer Nilsa De La Luz, a Salsa dance troupe, and a full band with back-up singers, to generate immersive Latino worlds and narratives called Salsa Bruja. From its inception, in June 2014, Salsa Bruja sold out the Pregones Theater and other major venues.

== Activism and community engagement ==
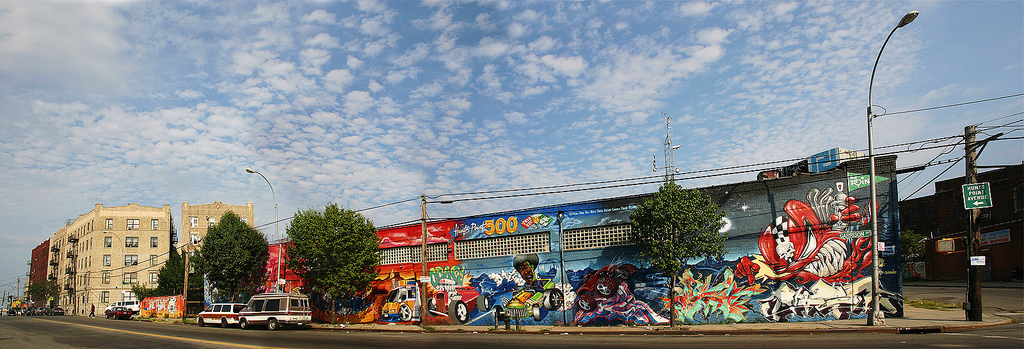
Mural amidst tenements in Hunts Point

For decades – from her early years as a community organizer in Hunts Point until the present – De la Luz used her talents to give back to her community by working with local organizations that help young people, especially young Latinas. The struggle and social injustice she witnessed during her community organizing left an indelible imprint on De la Luz. The daily issues were serious: including teen pregnancy, low educational attainment, drug use and STDs. De la Luz believes that many of these difficulties stem from the complex and often bewildering balance of two cultures, diverse family roots, and an increasingly elusive "American" identity.

External videos
- Caridad De la Luz, aka La Bruja, raises awareness about conditions in Puerto Rico

External videos
- De la Luz speaks about the closing of the Spofford Juvenile Detention Center, and the transformative power of poetry and art.

“I worked with youth before becoming La Bruja," she said. “But once I saw the statistics of Latinas in particular, I felt the need to create something to bring awareness about these issues from a Latina perspective." For this reason she founded Latinas4Life: an organization which runs high school workshops around the city with a focus on positive role modeling, constructive introspection, cultural awareness, and self-respect.

De la Luz is a board member of, and helps to develop workshops for, Voices UnBroken: a non-profit organization that produces writing workshops for Bronx young people in foster care, as well as adults in homeless shelters and correctional facilities.

She frequently performs in schools, hospitals, prisons, universities, and community centers around the country. She supports positive change for the hip hop generation through organizations such as Voices UnBroken, BronxWorks, the New York City Mission Society, Good Shepherd Services, and Pepatian, Inc. She is also a staunch advocate for ending domestic violence.

In 2014, she hosted the VIP Mujeres Beauty of Survival Benefit at the Museum of New York. Together with dancer Cynthia Paniagua, and produced by Pepatian, she performs a dance theater piece called Shadow Lands which helps to facilitate creative healing, for women who have suffered through domestic violence. In 2024, De la Luz was honored at the initial Bronx Community Foundation gala, alongside former National Basketball Association player John Starks, former deputy mayor Sheena Wright and hip-hop musician D-Nice; all honorees were recognized for contributions to or support of the Bronx. In 2025, De la Luz was honored by the Puerto Rican Traveling Theater as part of its "48Hours in..." series, entitled 48Hours in El Bronx.

== Honors and awards ==
De la Luz's combination of poetry, theater, music, dance, and lifelong community activism has not gone unnoticed. In 2005, she was selected by the New York Spanish-language newspaper El Diario La Prensa as one of the "Fifty most distinguished Latinas in the United States".

Further recognition includes:

- 2019 Jerome Foundation Artist Fellowship
- Puerto Rican Women Legacy Award
- Edgar Allan Poe Award from The Bronx County Historical Society
- Bronx Living Legend Award the Bronx Music Heritage Center
- Godmother of the Youth in the National Puerto Rican Day Parade
- Beauty of Survival Award from the Violence Intervention Program, Inc.
- Citation of Merit from the Borough President of the Bronx
- Top 20 Puerto Rican Women Everyone Should Know

== Currently ==
De la Luz is cultivating her own art space called El Garaje (The Garage) in the Soundview area of the Bronx, where she lives with her children.

She led a workshop called "How Can I Change the World" for the East Harlem Tutorial Program, which evolved into her current writing workshop "Write Your Way Representing Voices UnBroken," which she teaches at YAFFA Cultural Arts, Voices UnBroken, and through her own organization, Latinas4Life.

During her spare time she enjoys singing, dancing and traveling to Puerto Rico. She regularly hosts an open mic show at the Nuyorican Poets Café.

She is also a spokesmodel for Levis Jean's in a nationwide print campaign which runs in Glamour, Entertainment Weekly, US Weekly and Marie Claire magazines. De la Luz was selected as a 2019 Artist Fellow by the Jerome Foundation. This will enable her to expand her knowledge of Indigenous practices, by visiting artists and healers of First Nations along the Northwest Coast of North America, Peru and Africa. Her long-range intent is to create transformation via art and Indigenous worldview healing practices.

== See also ==
- List of Puerto Rican writers
- List of Puerto Ricans
- Puerto Rican literature
