= Peter Rock (novelist) =

American novelist

- Born: 1967 (age 58–59); Salt Lake City, Utah, U.S.
- Education: Deep Springs College; Yale University (BA)
- Occupation: Writer
- Writing career
- Notable works: This Is the Place; My Abandonment; The Night Swimmers
- Notable awards: Henfield Award, 1996; Utah Book Award, 2010; Alex Award, 2010; USC Scripter Award, 2010
- Website: www.peterrockproject.com

Peter Rock (born 1967) is an American novelist born and raised in Salt Lake City, Utah. His fiction often focuses on characters on the fringe of society.

Rock is a professor of creative writing at Reed College and lives in Portland, Oregon, with his wife and daughters.

== Biography ==
Rock attended Deep Springs College and received a BA in English from Yale University in 1991. He was a Wallace Stegner Fellow at the Stanford Writing Program from 1995 to 1997. The manuscript for his novel This Is the Place won the Henfield Award in 1996.

In 2010, Rock's novel My Abandonment, based on a true story, received an Alex Award by the American Library Association. It also won the Utah Book Award and was made into Debra Granik's 2018 film Leave No Trace, starring Ben Foster and Thomasin McKenzie. Rock was given a USC Scripter Award in 2010 for his role in the creation of the screenplay.

His short stories have appeared in Tin House, Zoetrope: All-Story, One Story, and other literary magazines. Many of these stories are compiled in The Unsettling (2006). His fiction and non-fiction have also appeared in the New York Times T Magazine. His novel, Passerthrough, was published in 2022. His most recent novel, Makeshift, was published in 2026.

He received a National Endowment for the Arts Fellowship in 1998 and a Guggenheim Fellowship in 2014. His novel The Night Swimmers was a finalist for the 2020 PEN/Faulkner Award for Fiction.

Before joining Reed in 2001, he taught fiction at the University of Pennsylvania, at San Francisco State University, and at Yale University.

== Books ==
- Makeshift (Soft Skull Press, 2026)
- Passersthrough (Penguin Random House, 2022) ISBN 978-1641293433
- The Night Swimmers (Soho Press, 2019) ISBN 978-1641290005
- Spells: A Novel Within Photographs (Counterpoint, April 2017) ISBN 978-1619029002
- Klickitat (Harry N. Abrams, April 2016) ISBN 978-1419718946
- The Shelter Cycle (Houghton Mifflin Harcourt, April 2013) ISBN 978-0547859088
- My Abandonment (Mariner Books, March 2009) ISBN 978-1328588715
- The Unsettling (MP Publishing, 2006) ISBN 978-1849822183
- The Bewildered (MacAdam/Cage, 2005)
- The Ambidextrist (Context Books, 2004) ISBN 978-1893956223
- Carnival Wolves (Knopf Doubleday Publishing Group, 1998) ISBN 978-0385492096
- This is the Place (Knopf Doubleday Publishing Group, 1997) ISBN 978-0385485982
