= Gotham Independent Film Awards 2010 =

Annual US film awards ceremony

20th Annual Gotham Independent Film Awards
- Date: November 29, 2010
- Country: United States
- Presented by: Independent Filmmaker Project
- Hosted by: Patricia Clarkson and Stanley Tucci

Highlights
- Most wins: Winter's Bone (2)
- Most nominations: Winter's Bone (4)
- Best Feature: Winter's Bone
- Breakthrough Director: Kevin Asch – Holy Rollers
- Website: https://gotham.ifp.org

The 20th Annual Gotham Independent Film Awards, presented by the Independent Filmmaker Project, were held on November 29, 2010 and were hosted by Patricia Clarkson and Stanley Tucci. The nominees were announced on October 18, 2010.

== Winners and nominees ==
Best Feature: Winter's Bone; Black Swan; Blue Valentine; The Kids Are All Right; Let Me In	Best Documentary Feature: The Oath; 12th & Delaware; Inside Job; Public Speaking; Sweetgrass
Breakthrough Director: Kevin Asch – Holy Rollers; Lena Dunham – Tiny Furniture; Glenn Ficarra and John Requa – I Love You Phillip Morris; Tanya Hamilton – Night Catches Us; John Wells – The Company Men	Breakthrough Actor: Ronald Bronstein – Daddy Longlegs as Lenny; Prince Adu – Prince of Broadway as Lucky; Greta Gerwig – Greenberg as Florence Marr; Jennifer Lawrence – Winter's Bone as Ree Dolly; John Ortiz – Jack Goes Boating as Clyde
Audience Award: Waiting for "Superman"; 9000 Needles; Brotherhood; Winter's Bone; White Irish Drinkers	Best Film Not Playing at a Theater Near You: Littlerock; Kati with an i; On Coal River; Summer Pasture; The Wolf Knife
Best Ensemble Performance: Winter's Bone – Kevin Breznahan, Dale Dickey, Garret Dillahunt, John Hawkes, Jennifer Lawrence, and Lauren Sweetser; The Kids Are All Right – Annette Bening, Josh Hutcherson, Julianne Moore, Mark Ruffalo, and Mia Wasikowska; Life During Wartime – Shirley Henderson, Ciarán Hinds, Allison Janney, Michael Lerner, Chris Marquette, Rich Pecci, Paul Reubens, Charlotte Rampling, Ally Sheedy, Dylan Riley Snyder, Renée Taylor, and Michael K. Williams; Please Give – Ann Guilbert, Rebecca Hall, Catherine Keener, Thomas Ian Nicholas, Amanda Peet, Oliver Platt, Lois Smith, and Sarah Steele; Tiny Furniture – David Call, Grace Dunham, Lena Dunham, Sarah Sophie Flicker, Rachel Howe, Garland Hunter, Isen Hunter, Alex Karpovsky, Jemima Kirke, Amy Seimetz, Laurie Simmons, and Merritt Wever

=== Gotham Tributes ===
- Darren Aronofsky
- Robert Duvall
- James Schamus
- Hilary Swank
