= Debra Granik =

American film director (born 1963)

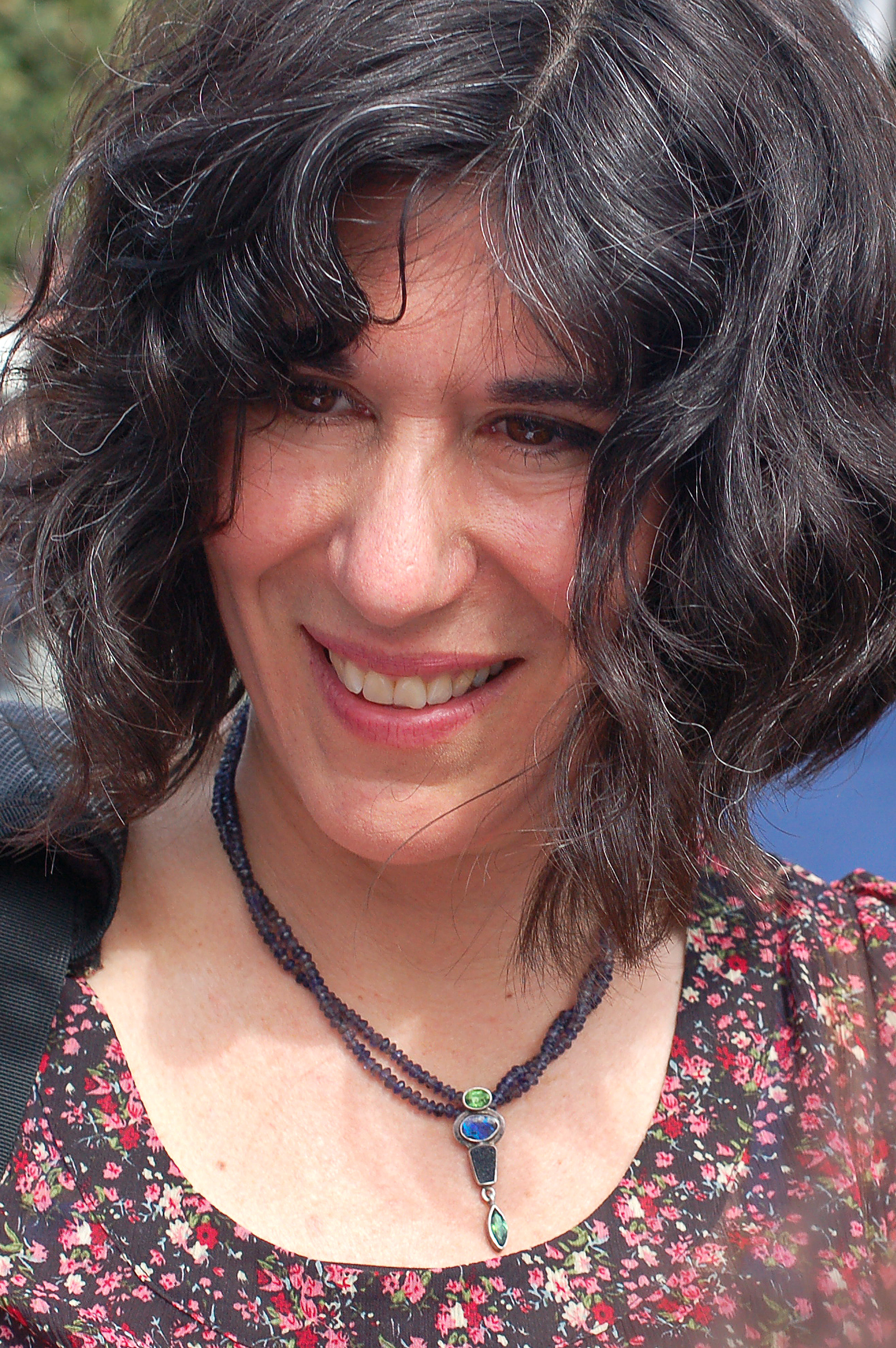
- At the 2010 Deauville American Film Festival
- Born: February 6, 1963 (age 63); Cambridge, Massachusetts, U.S.
- Education: Brandeis University; Tisch School of the Arts
- Occupations: Film director; screenwriter
- Years active: 1987–present
- Spouse: Jonathan Scheuer
- Children: 1

Debra Granik (born February 6, 1963) is an American filmmaker. She is most known for 2004's Down to the Bone, which starred Vera Farmiga, 2010's Winter's Bone, which starred Jennifer Lawrence in her breakout performance and for which Granik was nominated for the Academy Award for Best Adapted Screenplay, and 2018's Leave No Trace, a film based on the book My Abandonment by Peter Rock.

== Early life and education ==
Granik was born in Cambridge, Massachusetts, to father William R. Granik, an attorney with H.U.D. who litigated fair housing, and mother Brenda Granik Zusman. She grew up in the suburbs of Washington D.C.

Granik is the granddaughter of broadcast pioneer Ted Granik (1907–1970), founder and moderator of the long-run public affairs panel discussion program, The American Forum of the Air, on from 1934 to 1956, first on the radio and later on television. Granik is from a Jewish family.

In 1985, Granik received her B.A. in political science from Brandeis University. As an undergraduate at Brandeis, Granik also took classes at the Studio for Interrelated Media at the Massachusetts College of Art. In 2001, Granik received an MFA from NYU's Tisch School of the Arts.

While at Brandeis, Granik took Henry Felt's film and media workshop production class and volunteered with the Boston grassroots filmmaking organization Women's Video Collective. While at the Massachusetts College of Art, Granik made educational films for trade unions on subjects like workplace health and safety, one of which was made for the Massachusetts Division of Occupational Safety. Granik worked in production on educational media projects, eventually working on long form documentaries by Boston-area filmmakers before deciding to go to graduate school for filmmaking at New York University.

== Career ==
In 1997, Granik directed her first short film, Snake Feed, as her senior thesis with the mentorship of NYU film professor Boris Frumin, who was instrumental in sharing his love of post-World War II European neorealist films. Snake Feed, which began its life as a 7-minute documentary portrait exercise, was accepted into Sundance Institute's Lab Program for screenwriting and directing. Granik workshopped and developed the short film into a feature film at the Sundance Lab. Granik has said that Snake Feed was a work of narrative fiction, with the main characters, recovering addict Irene and her boyfriend Rick, playing dramatized versions of themselves.

In 2004, the short film of Snake Feed and the story of Irene and Rick became the basis of Granik's first feature-length film, Down to the Bone, which was a fictionalized depiction of their struggles. Down to the Bone is the story of an upstate New York mother who goes to rehab to kick her cocaine addiction and ends up falling in love with a nurse and descending back into her old drug habits. Down to the Bone was based on an original screenplay written by Granik and her creative partner, Anne Rosellini. The role of the main character Irene, played by Vera Farmiga, significantly raised Farmiga's profile as an actor. Down to the Bone was shot in Ulster County in upstate New York.

Granik's second feature, 2010's Winter's Bone, was an adaptation by Granik and Rosellini of the 2006 novel by Daniel Woodrell. It is the story of Ree Dolly, a teenager living in the Missouri's Ozark Mountains who is the sole caretaker of her two younger siblings and her catatonic mother. She is forced to hunt down her missing drug-dealing father in order to save her family from eviction.

The film starred a then-unknown Jennifer Lawrence and John Hawkes and won the Grand Jury Prize: Dramatic Film at the 2010 Sundance Film Festival, which led to a distribution deal with Roadside Attractions. Winter's Bone won the Seattle International Film Festival Golden Space Needle Audience Award for Best Director and Best Actress award for Jennifer Lawrence. In 2011, Winter's Bone was nominated for four Academy Awards: Best Picture, Best Adapted Screenplay, Best Actress for Jennifer Lawrence and Best Supporting Actor for John Hawkes. The film featured a soundtrack made up of old time gospel, bluegrass, and traditional music found in the Ozarks and was produced by Steve Peters. It features the singing of Marideth Sisco, who worked as a music and folklore consultant for the region, and also appeared in the Winter's Bone. The actor John Hawkes sings one track on the soundtrack.

Winter's Bone was shot on location in the Ozark area of southern Missouri. Granik cast many of the supporting roles with first-time actors from the surrounding area and all of the homes on screen were established Ozark homes—no sets were built for this film. For the look of the film, Granik kept most of the established aesthetics of the homes in which they were shooting and many of the few mementos that were added to the homes were contributed by Ozark people in the community.

Granik produced and directed an HBO television pilot called American High Life. The show was a family drama that "follows a young career woman to her economically depressed small home town in the midwest." The show was not picked up.

Granik developed a film adaption of Rule of the Bone, the 1995 novel by Russell Banks, but the project was still in development as of 2018.

In 2014, Granik's film, Stray Dog, was released. The film is a documentary about a man named Ron Hall, whose nickname is "Stray Dog," and portrays his life as an avid biker and Vietnam Veteran who sometimes struggles with PTSD. The film documents Hall's participation in an annual pilgrimage motorcycle ride called "Ride to the Wall" with fellow biker Vietnam vets from all over the country where they ride to the Vietnam Veterans Memorial in Washington, D.C. Granik had met Hall, who had a small role on Winter's Bone, during filming.

Granik directed the drama Leave No Trace, starring Ben Foster and newcomer Thomasin McKenzie, which was released in 2018, domestically by Bleecker Street and internationally by Sony Worldwide Acquisitions. The film tells the story of a father and daughter who illegally live on government land and are forced to adapt to more traditional living in mainstream life. It examines ideas of self-reliance and community, and was a critics' pick of The New York Times. Leave No Trace premiered at the 2018 Sundance Film Festival, and played at the Cannes Film Festival, and was shot in the forested areas of Oregon, including Forest Park near Portland, Oregon, over the course of 30 days. In addition to Oregon, Washington state was used for locations, with some scenes shot at a Christmas tree farm. Leave No Trace took approximately three and a half years to develop, from the first time Granik read Peter Rock's novel, My Abandonment, on which the film was based.

Other projects Granik has in development include a documentary about life after being released from jail and the subject of recidivism in East Baltimore – that was to feature Felicia "Snoop" Pearson from The Wire and elements of her memoir, Grace After Midnight – but is now a documentary about four former inmates in New York City.

Another project is a film based on Barbara Ehrenreich's book, Nickel and Dimed: On (Not) Getting By in America, which focuses on poverty and the working poor in America.

== Themes ==
Granik is known for discovering actors like Jennifer Lawrence, Vera Farmiga and Thomasin McKenzie who have gone on to successful careers after early roles in Granik's films. She is also known for using local, non-professional actors in her films. Granik has worked with creative partner Anne Rosellini on all of her films.

Granik has said that she sees a common thread of press coverage describing her as having a "comeback narrative," along with questions about how much time has elapsed between projects, partly due to the relatively low output of films in her career compared to the contemporaries she started out with.

Interviewed by Jeremiah Kipp in Filmmaker in 2005, Granik discussed the challenges of directing a movie like Down to the Bone. She gave an overview of the challenges involved in doing a film about addiction:

The traditional storyline in an American film is usually in the form of a V shape. I am oversimplifying, but we see someone tumbling down, they hit bottom, and then they rise up again and find redemption. Anyone who personally, tangentially or culturally knows anything about addiction is aware that it resembles an EKG. Up and down, up and down. Very few people ever get clean on the first or second attempt. For many people, it’s something they have to try over and over again. You get knocked down and ask all the ethical questions like how many chances do you give a person? When is the last chance? How many chances do they get? Can you imagine how difficult it is to fit that in a feature-length film? But those are the questions that are worth asking... The reason why boils down to the word “dark”. It is the scariest four-letter word in American storytelling and in this culture. Our film had a strong reception in Europe and achieved distribution, but that was not the case here. We received so many responses like, “We love the film, but we cannot do anything with it or we’ll lose our shirts. We’re sorry.” The intervention comes from people like Laemmle/Zeller Films. Every couple of years, some mavericks take on this challenge of distributing so-called un-distributable films. They take those films on a small run and allow them to see the light of day. Those efforts are what give a film like Down to the Bone a chance to have a life of some kind.

Granik's films deal with issues of personal strength and willpower, like the character of Ree Dolly in Winter's Bone. She cites Mike Leigh, Ken Loach, Shane Meadows, the Dardenne brothers, Laurent Cantet, and Abbas Kiarostami as some of her major influences in her directing career. In a 2018 interview with FF2 Media about Leave No Trace, Granik discusses the themes of the film and what drew her to creating the film:

I realized while reading it that one of the turning points in a girl’s coming-of-age is coming to terms with the fact that as much as you may care about someone, you can’t necessarily save them or even help them. You can be loving and tolerant, but you can’t fix them. And that’s something she’s really struggling with in a really robust way, especially when they’re in a new setting. And I really liked the fact that Tom is the one thing that’s grounding him. She is his source of meaning. His sense of self-worth is bolstered by being meaningful to her, by being her dad. He takes pride in being her teacher and taking responsibility for her. And I was just so interested in the universality of that. The ties that bind is core material. There’s nothing new about those themes, but I really liked that the novel had renewed my interest in exploring them.

== Personal life ==
Granik is married to Jonathan Scheuer, who has executive produced her films and is Vice Chairman of the Board of Trustees of the National Jazz Museum in Harlem. They live in New York City and have a child.

== Filmography ==
Television

| Year | Title | Notes |
|---|---|---|
| 2005, 2015 | Independent Lens | Episodes "Stray Dog" (director) and "Thunder in Guyana/United States of Poetry" (DoP) |
| 2024 | Conbody vs. Everybody | creator, director, executive producer |

Documentary

- 2003: Thunder in Guyana – cinematographer

Short film

| Year | Title | Director | Writer | Producer |
|---|---|---|---|---|
| 1997 | Snake Feed | Yes | Yes | Yes |

Feature film

| Year | Title | Director | Writer |
|---|---|---|---|
| 2004 | Down to the Bone | Yes | Yes |
| 2010 | Winter's Bone | Yes | Yes |
| 2018 | Leave No Trace | Yes | Yes |

== Awards and nominations ==
- 1997: Austin Film Festival, Short Film Award (nominated) for Snake Feed
- 1998: Sundance Film Festival, Honorable Mention Short Filmmaking for Snake Feed
- 2002: Nantucket Film Festival, Tony Cox Award for Screenwriting for Down to the Bone
- 2004: Deauville American Film Festival, Grand Prix (nominated) for Down to the Bone
- 2004: Florida Film Festival, Grand Jury Award for Down to the Bone
- 2004: Gotham Awards, Gotham Independent Film Awards 2010, Breakthrough Director Award (nominated) for Down to the Bone
- 2004: Locarno International Film Festival, Golden Leopard - Video (nominated) for Down to the Bone
- 2004: Marrakech International Film Festival, Golden Star Award (nominated) for Down to the Bone
- 2004: Sundance Film Festival, Grand Jury Prize Dramatic (nominated) for Down to the Bone
- 2004: Sundance Film Festival, Directing Award Dramatic for Down to the Bone
- 2005: Independent Spirit Awards, 26th Independent Spirit Awards, John Cassavetes Award (nominated) for Down to the Bone – with Richard Lieske, Susan Leber, Anne Rosellini
- 2010: Amazonas Film Festival, Amazonas Award, Best Film for Winter's Bone
- 2010: Berlin International Film Festival, Confédération Internationale des Cinémas d’Art et d’Essai (C.I.C.A.E.), Forum Award for Winter's Bone
- 2010: Berlin International Film Festival, Tagesspiegel, Readers' Jury Award for Winter's Bone
- 2010: Boston Independent Film Festival, Audience Award: Best Feature for Winter's Bone
- 2010: Boston Independent Film Festival, Special Jury Prize: Narrative for Winter's Bone
- 2010: Camerimage, Best Directorial Debut (nominated) for Winter's Bone
- 2010: Chicago Film Critics Association Awards, CFCA Award: Best Director (nominated) for Winter's Bone
- 2010: Chicago Film Critics Association Awards, CFCA Award: Best Screenplay, Adapted (nominated) for Winter's Bone
- 2010: Dallas-Fort Worth Film Critics Association Awards, Russell Smith Award for Winter's Bone
- 2010: Deauville American Film Festival, Prix du Jury for Winter's Bone – tied with The Myth of the American Sleepover, directed by David Robert Mitchell
- 2010: Deauville American Film Festival, Grand Prix (nominated) for Winter's Bone
- 2010: Detroit Film Critics Society Awards, Best Director (nominated) for Winter's Bone
- 2010: Gotham Awards, Gotham Independent Film Awards 2010, Best Feature for Winter's Bone – with Anne Rosellini, Alix Madigan
- 2010: Gotham Awards, Gotham Independent Film Awards 2010, Audience Award (nominated) for Winter's Bone – with Anne Rosellini, Alix Madigan
- 2010: Houston Film Critics Society Awards, Best Screenplay (nominated) for Winter's Bone
- 2010: Indiana Film Journalists Association, Best Director (nominated) for Winter's Bone
- 2010: Phoenix Film Critics Society Awards, Breakout Performance: Behind the Camera for Winter's Bone
- 2010: San Diego Film Critics Society Awards, SDFCS Award: Best Director (nominated) for Winter's Bone
- 2010: San Diego Film Critics Society Awards, SDFCS Award: Best Screenplay, Adapted (nominated) for Winter's Bone
- 2010: San Francisco International Film Festival, Audience Award: Best Narrative Feature for Winter's Bone
- 2010: Satellite Awards, Best Director (nominated) for Winter's Bone
- 2010: Satellite Awards, Best Screenplay, Adapted (nominated) for Winter's Bone
- 2010: Seattle International Film Festival, Golden Space Needle Award, Best Director for Winter's Bone
- 2010: Southeastern Film Critics Association Awards, Best Adapted Screenplay (nominated) for Winter's Bone
- 2010: Stockholm Film Festival, FIPRESCI Prize, Best Film for Winter's Bone
- 2010: St. Louis Film Critics Association, Best Adapted Screenplay (nominated) for Winter's Bone
- 2010: Sundance Film Festival, Grand Jury Prize: Dramatic Film for Winter's Bone
- 2010: Sundance Film Festival, Waldo Salt Screenwriting Award, for Winter's Bone – with Anne Rosellini
- 2010: Torino Film Festival, "Achille Valdata" Audience Award for Winter's Bone
- 2010: Torino Film Festival, Holden Award for Best Script for Winter's Bone
- 2010: Torino Film Festival, Prize of the City of Torino: Best Feature Film for Winter's Bone
- 2010: Utah Film Critics Association Awards, Best Screenplay (nominated) for Winter's Bone
- 2010: Village Voice Film Poll, Best Screenplay (nominated) for Winter's Bone - with Anne Rosellini
- 2010: Washington DC Area Film Critics Association Awards, Best Adapted Screenplay (nominated) for Winter's Bone
- 2010: Women Film Critics Circle Awards, WFCC Award. Best Movie by a Woman for Winter's Bone
- 2011: Academy of Motion Picture Arts and Sciences, 83rd Academy Awards, Best Picture (nominated) for Winter's Bone
- 2011: Academy of Motion Picture Arts and Sciences, 83rd Academy Awards, Best Adapted Screenplay (nominated) for Winter's Bone – with Anne Rosellini, based on the novel by Daniel Woodrell
- 2011: Alliance of Women Film Journalists, EDA Female Focus Award: Best Woman Director
- 2011: Alliance of Women Film Journalists, EDA Female Focus Award: Outstanding Achievement by a Woman in the Film Industry
- 2011: Athena Film Festival, Director's Award for Vision and Talent for Winter's Bone
- 2011: British Independent Film Awards, Best Foreign Film (nominated) for Winter's Bone
- 2011: Central Ohio Film Critics Association, Breakthrough Film Artist (nominated) for Winter's Bone
- 2011: Central Ohio Film Critics Association, Best Adapted Screenplay (nominated) for Winter's Bone
- 2011: Chlotrudis Awards, Best Director for Winter's Bone
- 2011: Humanitas Prize, Sundance Film Category for Winter's Bone – with Anne Rosellini
- 2011: Independent Spirit Awards, 26th Independent Spirit Awards, Best Feature (nominated) for Winter's Bone
- 2011: Independent Spirit Awards, 26th Independent Spirit Awards, Best Director (nominated) for Winter's Bone
- 2011: Independent Spirit Awards, 26th Independent Spirit Awards, Best Screenplay (nominated) for Winter's Bone – with Anne Rosellini
- 2015: Atlanta Film Festival, Jury Award, Best Documentary Feature for Stray Dog – with Anne Rosellini
- 2015: Independent Spirit Awards, 30th Independent Spirit Awards Best Documentary Feature (nominated) for Stray Dog
- 2018: Seattle International Film Festival, Grand Jury Prize (nominated) for Leave No Trace
- 2018: Seattle International Film Festival, Golden Space Needle Award, Best Director (nominated) for Leave No Trace
- 2018: Los Angeles Film Critics Association Award for Best Director
- 2018: National Board of Review: Top Ten Independent Films
- 2019: Inaugural Career Spotlight Award of the Boston Society of Film Critics
