= Anne Rosellini =

American film producer and screenwriter

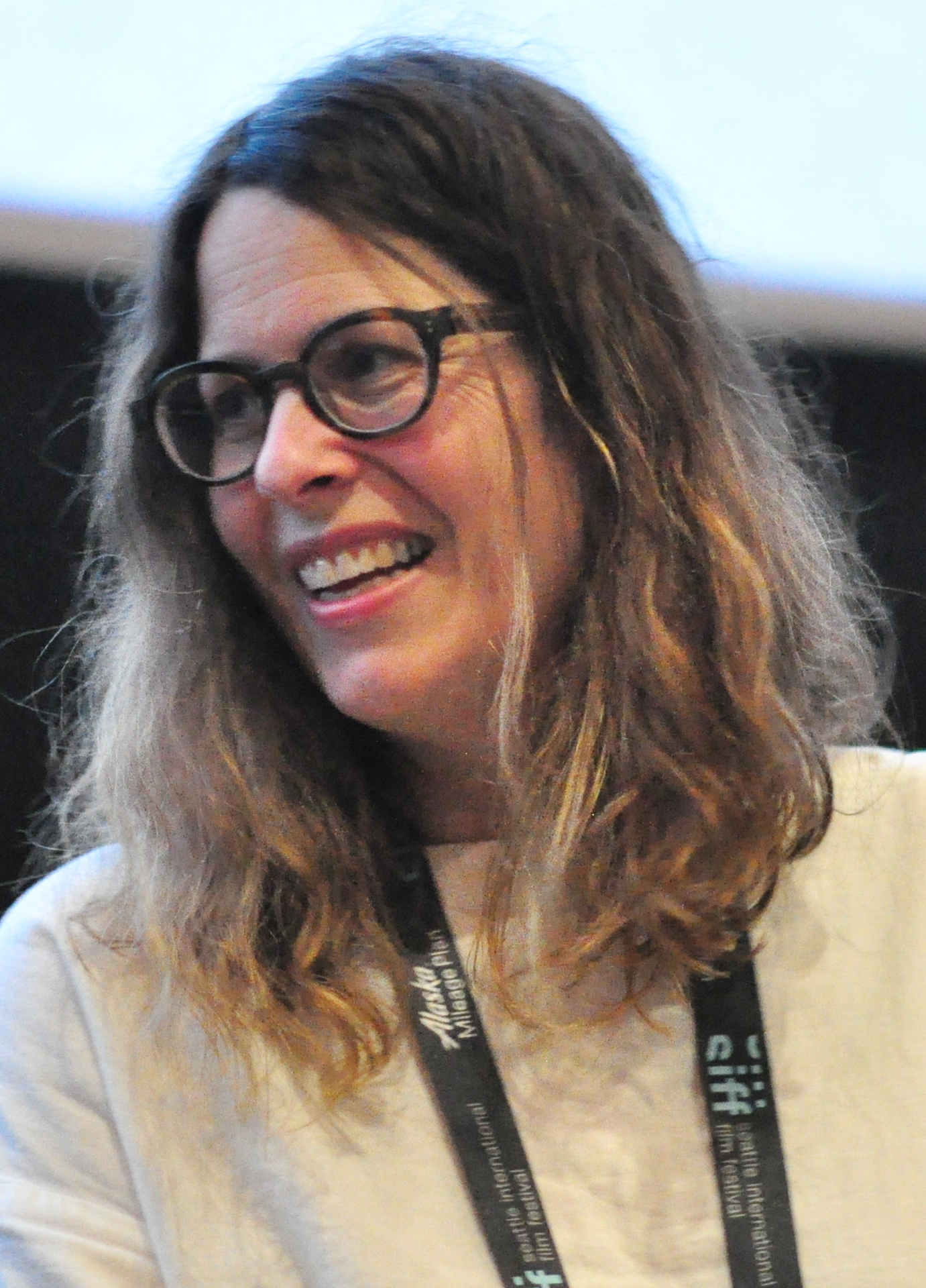
- Rosellini in 2018
- Born: United States
- Occupations: Film producer, screenwriter
- Children: 1

Anne Rosellini is an American film producer and screenwriter. She is best known for writing and producing the 2010 film Winter's Bone with her frequent collaborator Debra Granik. Her work has been nominated for numerous awards, including the Academy Award for Best Picture and for Best Adapted Screenplay. Before becoming a film producer, she was a programmer for various film festivals in Seattle, Washington.

== Early life and career ==
Rosellini grew up in Mercer Island, Washington, where she attended Mercer Island High School. She later received a Bachelor of Fine Arts, focusing on film theory and film history, from the School of the Art Institute of Chicago. After graduating she relocated to Seattle and established the 1 Reel Film Festival, an annual presentation of short films, while also selecting films to play at the Seattle International Film Festival and the city's Women in Film Festival. She worked briefly in film acquisitions for Arab Film Distribution and Atom Films before moving to New York.

== Producing and screenwriting career ==
In New York, Rosellini began to collaborate with Debra Granik, who at the time was writing a feature film and sought a producer. The project eventuated as Down to the Bone, released in 2004, which was produced by Rosellini and co-written and directed by Granik. Rosellini went on to produce the 2007 horror film Cthulhu before returning to work with Granik on a second feature together. After reading Daniel Woodrell's book Winter's Bone, Rosellini and Granik decided to write a screenplay based on the manuscript together. Rosellini had no prior experience in screenwriting, but she has said, "I didn't have the money to hire a writer, so I just decided to do it myself." The film, Winter's Bone, which was produced by Rosellini, took several years to write, cast and film, and was released in 2010. It received a multitude of accolades, including four Academy Award nominations and seven Independent Spirit Award nominations. Of those, Rosellini was personally nominated for the Academy Awards for Best Picture and Best Adapted Screenplay, and the Spirit Award for Best Screenplay. Rosellini and Granik also won a Humanitas Prize for Sundance Feature Films.

In 2013, Rosellini and Granik were collaborating on another film adaptation of a book as well as a documentary film.

== Personal life ==
Rosellini lives in Brooklyn with her partner and their son, born in 2010.
