= Winter's Bone =

2010 film by Debra Granik

- Theatrical release poster
- Directed by: Debra Granik
- Screenplay by: Debra Granik; Anne Rosellini
- Based on: Winter's Bone by Daniel Woodrell
- Produced by: Anne Rosellini; Alix Madigan-Yorkin
- Starring: Jennifer Lawrence; John Hawkes; Kevin Breznahan; Dale Dickey; Garret Dillahunt; Sheryl Lee; Tate Taylor
- Cinematography: Michael McDonough
- Edited by: Affonso Gonçalves
- Music by: Dickon Hinchliffe
- Production companies: Anonymous Content; Winter's Bone Productions
- Distributed by: Roadside Attractions
- Release dates: January 21, 2010 (Sundance); June 11, 2010 (United States)
- Running time: 100 minutes
- Country: United States
- Language: English
- Budget: $2 million
- Box office: $16.1 million

Winter's Bone is a 2010 American Southern Gothic coming-of-age tragedy film directed by Debra Granik. It was adapted by Granik and Anne Rosellini from the 2006 novel by Daniel Woodrell. The film stars Jennifer Lawrence as a poverty-stricken teenage girl named Ree Dolly in the rural Ozarks of Missouri who must locate her missing father to save her family from homelessness.

Winter's Bone received critical acclaim upon release, with high praise directed towards Lawrence's performance. The film also emerged as a commercial success at the box-office, earning $16.1 million on a budget of $2 million.

The film won several awards, including the Grand Jury Prize: Dramatic Film at the 2010 Sundance Film Festival. It received four Oscar nominations at the 83rd Academy Awards: Best Picture, Best Adapted Screenplay, Best Actress in a Leading Role for Lawrence (who at 20 was the second-youngest Best Actress nominee at the time), and Best Supporting Actor for John Hawkes. In addition, Lawrence was nominated for Best Actress – Motion Picture Drama and Outstanding Leading Actress at the 68th Golden Globe Awards and 17th Screen Actors Guild Awards, respectively.

== Plot ==
In the rural Ozarks of Missouri, seventeen-year-old Ree Dolly looks after her mentally ill mother, Connie, twelve-year-old brother Sonny, and six-year-old sister Ashlee. She makes sure her siblings eat and teaches them survival skills such as hunting and cooking. The family is destitute. Ree's father, Jessup, has not been home for a long time; his whereabouts are unknown. He is out on bail following an arrest for manufacturing meth.

Sheriff Baskin tells Ree that if her father does not appear for his court date, they will lose the house because it was put up as part of his bond. Ree sets out to find her father. She starts with her meth-addicted uncle Teardrop and continues to more distant kin, eventually trying to talk to the local crime boss, Thump Milton. Milton refuses to see her; the only information Ree comes up with are warnings to leave the situation alone and stories that Jessup died in a meth lab fire or skipped town to avoid the trial.

When Jessup fails to appear for the trial, the bondsman comes looking for him and tells Ree that she has about a week before the house and land are seized. Ree tells him that Jessup must be dead, because "Dollys don't run". He tells her that she must provide proof that her father is dead to avoid the bond being forfeited.

Ree tries to go see Milton again and is severely beaten by the women of his family. Teardrop rescues Ree, promising her attackers that she will not cause more trouble. Teardrop tells Ree that her father was killed because he was going to inform on other meth cookers, but he does not know who killed him. He warns her that if she finds out who did, she must not tell him because he will seek revenge. Ree is driven home by Teardrop, where her injuries are taken care of by Gail and other women of Rathlin Valley.

Later, Ree talks to an Army recruiter about enlisting for the $40,000 bonus, but he tells her that she needs her parents' signatures to enlist and that she is trying to enlist for the wrong reasons.

On the way home from a bar and, after antagonising some of Thump's henchmen, Ree and her uncle are pulled over by the sheriff, who wants to question Teardrop. After a tense standoff, where Teardrop implies that he knows the Sheriff leaked that Jessup was an informer, Teardrop drives off.

A few nights later, the Milton women who beat Ree come to her house and offer to take her to "[her] daddy's bones". The women place a sack on her head and drive her to a pond, where they row to the shallow area where her father's submerged body lies. They tell Ree to reach into the water and grasp her father's hands so they can cut them off with a chainsaw; the severed hands will serve as proof of death for the authorities. Ree takes the hands to the sheriff, telling him that someone flung them onto the porch of her house.

The bondsman gives Ree the cash portion of the bond, which was put up by an anonymous associate of Jessup. Ree tries to give Jessup's banjo to Teardrop, but he tells her to keep it at the house for him. As he is leaving, he tells her that he now knows who killed her father. Ree reassures Sonny and Ashlee that she will never leave them. As the three sit on the porch, Ashlee begins to play their father's banjo.

== Cast ==
- Jennifer Lawrence as Ruthie "Ree" Dolly, a 17-year-old girl in the Ozark Mountains
- John Hawkes as Teardrop, Ree's uncle and methamphetamine addict
- Kevin Breznahan as Little Arthur, methamphetamine gang member
- Dale Dickey as Merab, wife of the methamphetamine gang leader
- Garret Dillahunt as Sheriff Baskin
- Sheryl Lee as April, ex-girlfriend of Ree's father
- Lauren Sweetser as Gail, Ree's friend who left school to have a baby
- Tate Taylor as Mike Satterfield, the bail bondsman

In addition, Isaiah Stone and Ashlee Thompson play Ree's younger brother and sister, respectively.

== Reception ==
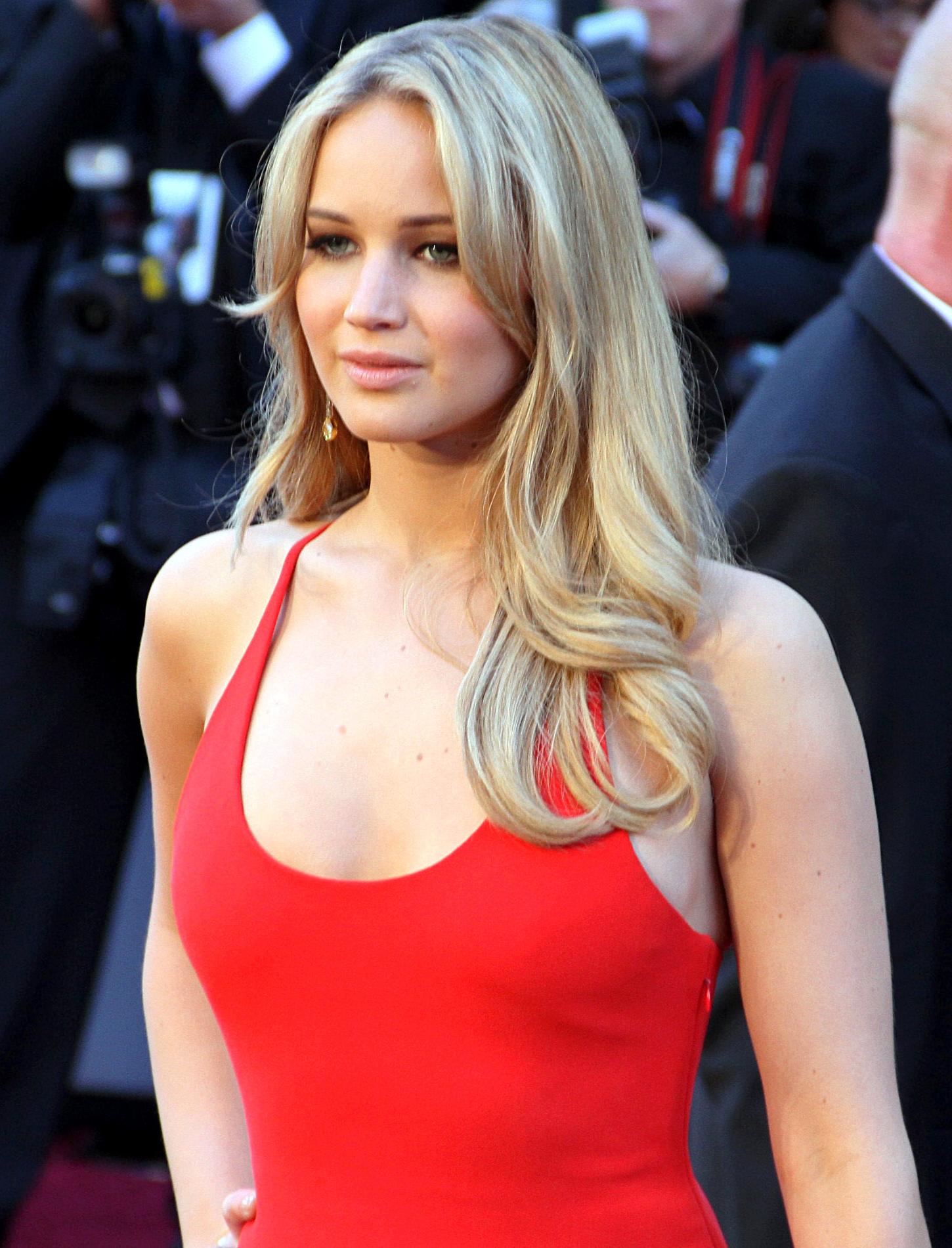
Jennifer Lawrence's performance was universally lauded and the 20-year-old garnered her first nomination for the Academy Award for Best Actress, becoming the second-youngest Best Actress nominee at the time.

=== Critical response ===
On the review aggregator website Rotten Tomatoes, 94% of 173 critics' reviews are positive. The website's consensus reads: "Bleak, haunting, and yet still somehow hopeful, Winter's Bone is writer-director Debra Granik's best work yet — and it boasts an incredible, starmaking performance from Jennifer Lawrence." Metacritic, which uses a weighted average, assigned the film a score of 90 out of 100, based on 38 critics, indicating "universal acclaim".

Roger Ebert gave the film 4 out of 4 stars, praising Lawrence's steely "hope and courage" that remains optimistic despite her tribulations, and calling attention to Granik's direction that avoids passing moral judgment on the characters or descending into stereotypes. Reviewer Peter Travers found the film "unforgettable," writing in Rolling Stone, "Granik handles this volatile, borderline horrific material with unblinking ferocity and feeling.... In Lawrence, Granik has found just the right young actress to inhabit Ree. Her performance is more than acting, it's a gathering storm." Critic James Berardinelli said that "Winter's Bone is a welcome reminder that thrillers don't have to be loud and boisterous to grab the attention and keep it captive." David Edelstein wrote in New York magazine, "For all the horror, it's the drive toward life, not the decay, that lingers in the mind. As a modern heroine, Ree Dolly has no peer, and Winter's Bone is the year's most stirring film." New Yorker critic David Denby called Winter's Bone "one of the great feminist works in film".

=== Top ten lists ===
Winter's Bone was highly rated in many critics end-of-year lists, and Metacritic ranked it in second place for the year, only behind The Social Network.

- 1st – David Edelstein, New York
- 1st – The A.V. Club
- 1st – Keith Phipps, The A.V. Club
- 1st – David Germain, Associated Press
- 1st – Anne Thompson, Indiewire
- 1st – David Fear, Time Out New York
- 1st – Peter Hartlaub, San Francisco Chronicle
- 2nd – David Ansen, Newsweek
- 2nd – Betsy Sharkey, Los Angeles Times
- 2nd – Noel Murray and Scott Tobias, The A.V. Club
- 3rd – Christy Lemire, Associated Press
- 3rd – Lisa Schwarzbaum, Entertainment Weekly
- 3rd – Eric Kohn, Indiewire
- 5th – Roger Ebert, Chicago Sun-Times
- 5th – Joshua Rothkopf, Time Out New York
- 6th – Tasha Robinson, The A.V. Club
- 9th – Kirk Honeycutt, The Hollywood Reporter
- 9th – Peter Travers, Rolling Stone
- 10th – Kenneth Turan, Los Angeles Times
- 10th – Claudia Puig, USA Today
- 10th – Peter Rainer, Christian Science Monitor
- Top 10 (listed alphabetically) – Joe Morgenstern, The Wall Street Journal
- Top 10 (listed alphabetically) – David Denby and Anthony Lane The New Yorker
- Top 10 (listed alphabetically) – Carrie Rickey and Steven Rea Philadelphia Inquirer
- Top 10 (listed alphabetically) – Rick Groen and Liam Lacey The Globe and Mail

The Writers Guild Foundation listed the script as one of the best in 2010s film and television. The script was praised as "filled with really specific dialogue and mountain speak, which just makes everything more vivid." In 2021, members of Writers Guild of America West (WGAW) and Writers Guild of America, East (WGAE) voted the film's screenplay 98th in WGA’s 101 Greatest Screenplays of the 21st Century (so far).

In July 2025, it ranked number 99 on Rolling Stone's list of "The 100 Best Movies of the 21st Century".

=== Box office ===
Winter's Bone debuted in cinemas on June 11, 2010 in a limited release in 4 theaters and grossed "a hearty" $84,797, with an average of $21,199 per theater and ranking #35 at the box office. The film's subsequent outing and expansion to 39 theaters earned $351,317, with an average of $9,008 per theater. The film's distributors Roadside Attractions aimed, concurrently with New York, Los Angeles and Boston, at "heartland cities" such as Minneapolis, Overland Park, St. Louis, Springfield, Dallas and Denver, which eventually all attracted significant audiences, surpassing New York's. According to the distributor, "the filmmakers had always wanted to deliver the movie to the people who helped them make it". The film was in cinemas for over 45 weeks and ultimately earned $6,531,503 domestically and $9,600,048 internationally for a total of $16,131,551, surpassing its $2 million budget.

=== Accolades ===
The film won the Grand Jury Prize: Dramatic Film and the Best Screenplay Award at the 2010 Sundance Film Festival. It also received two awards at the 2010 Berlin Film Festival in Germany and at the 2010 Stockholm International Film Festival, it won the awards for Best Film, Best Actress (Lawrence) and the Fipresci Prize.

Winter's Bone also won Best Feature and Best Ensemble Performance at the 2010 Gotham Awards and it earned seven nominations at the 2010 Independent Spirit Awards, including Best Film, Best Director, and Best Actress.

== See also ==
- Runoff (2014 film)

Awards
Preceded by Precious	Sundance Grand Jury Prize: U.S. Dramatic; 2010	Succeeded by Like Crazy
