= 68th Golden Globe Awards =

Film award ceremony in 2011

- Date: January 16, 2011
- Site: The Beverly Hilton, Beverly Hills, California, U.S.
- Hosted by: Ricky Gervais

Highlights
- Best Film: Drama: The Social Network
- Best Film: Musical or Comedy: The Kids Are All Right
- Best Drama Series: Boardwalk Empire
- Best Musical or Comedy Series: Glee
- Best Miniseries or Television movie: Carlos
- Most awards: (4) The Social Network
- Most nominations: (7) The King's Speech

Television coverage
- Network: NBC

The 68th Golden Globe Awards were broadcast live from the Beverly Hilton Hotel in Beverly Hills, California on January 16, 2011, by NBC. The host was Ricky Gervais who hosted the ceremony for the second time. The nominations were announced on December 14, 2010, by Josh Duhamel, Katie Holmes and Blair Underwood. Robert De Niro was presented with the Cecil B. DeMille Award for lifetime achievement in motion pictures. The Social Network won four awards, the most of any film, including best drama. It beat British historical tale The King's Speech, which had entered the awards ceremony with the most nominations, but collected just one award.

== Winners and nominees ==
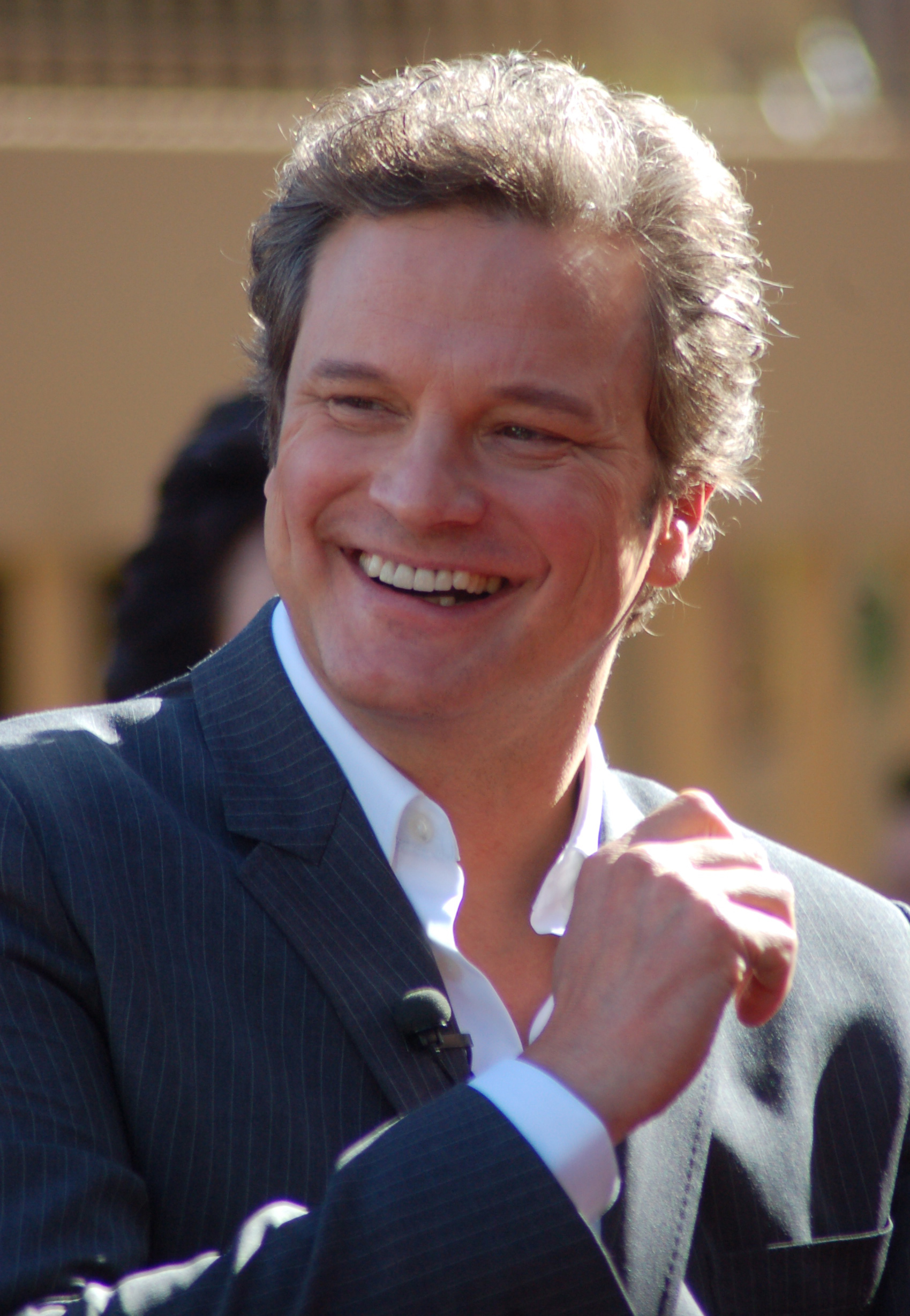
Colin Firth, Best Actor in a Motion Picture – Drama winner

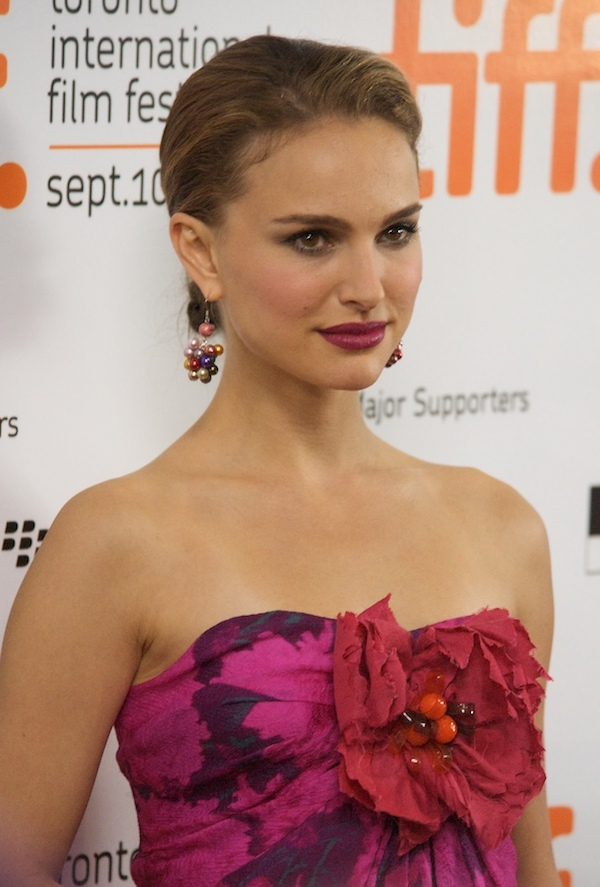
Natalie Portman, Best Actress in a Motion Picture – Drama winner

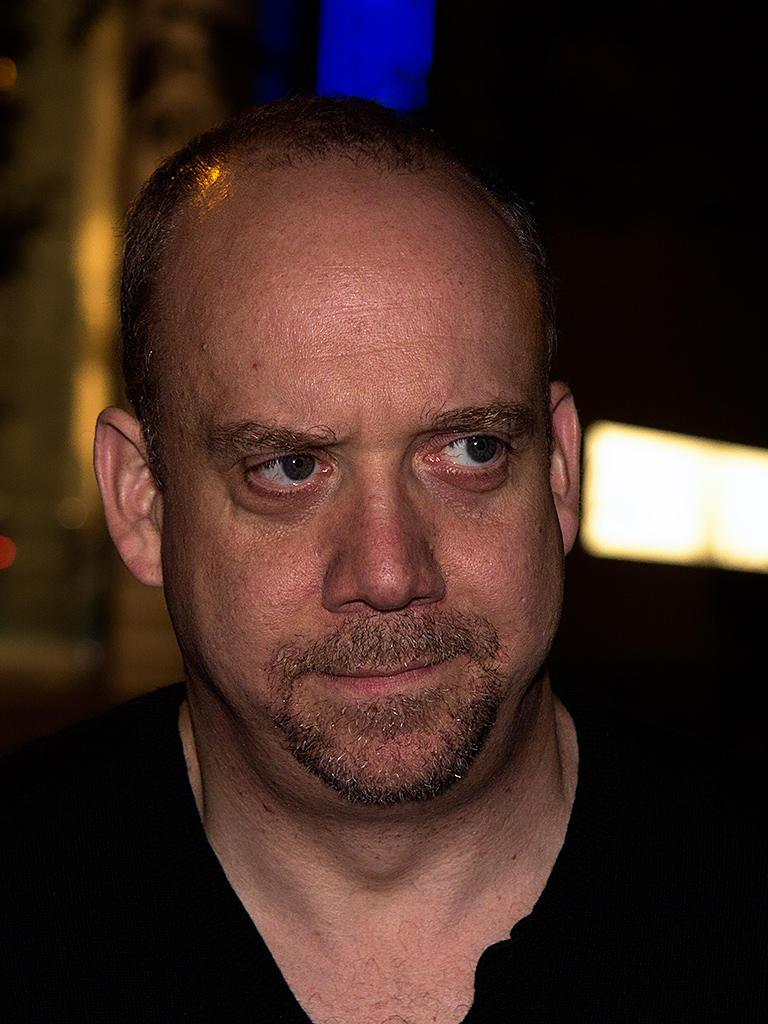
Paul Giamatti, Best Actor in a Motion Picture – Musical or Comedy winner

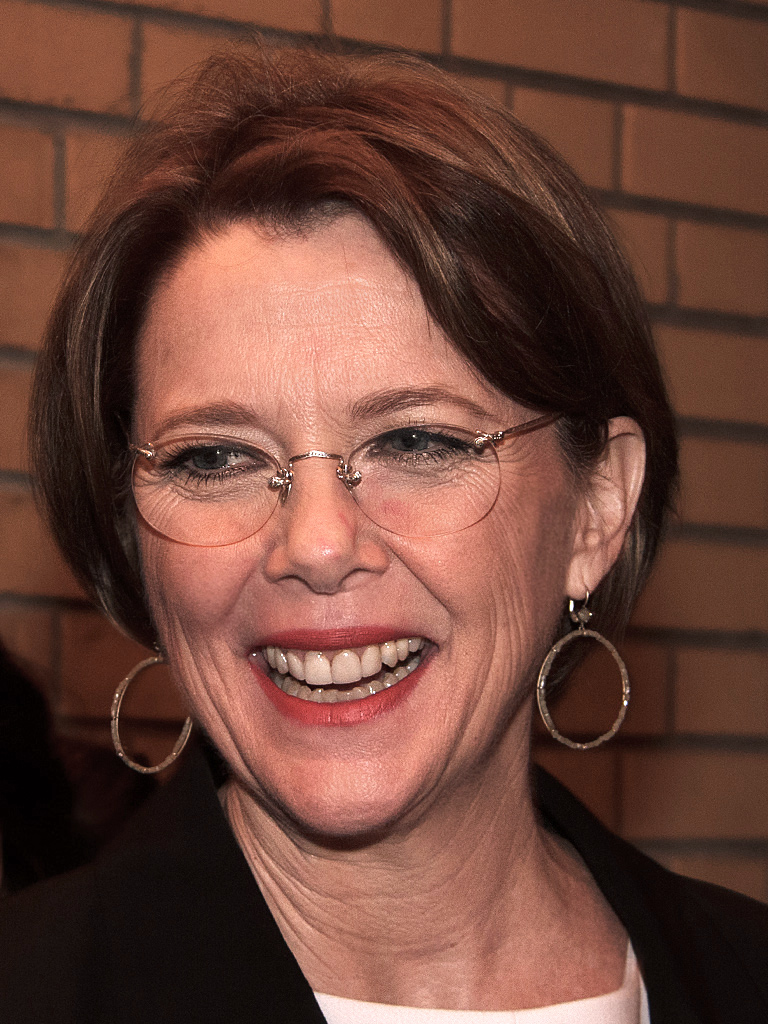
Annette Bening, Best Actress in a Motion Picture – Musical or Comedy winner

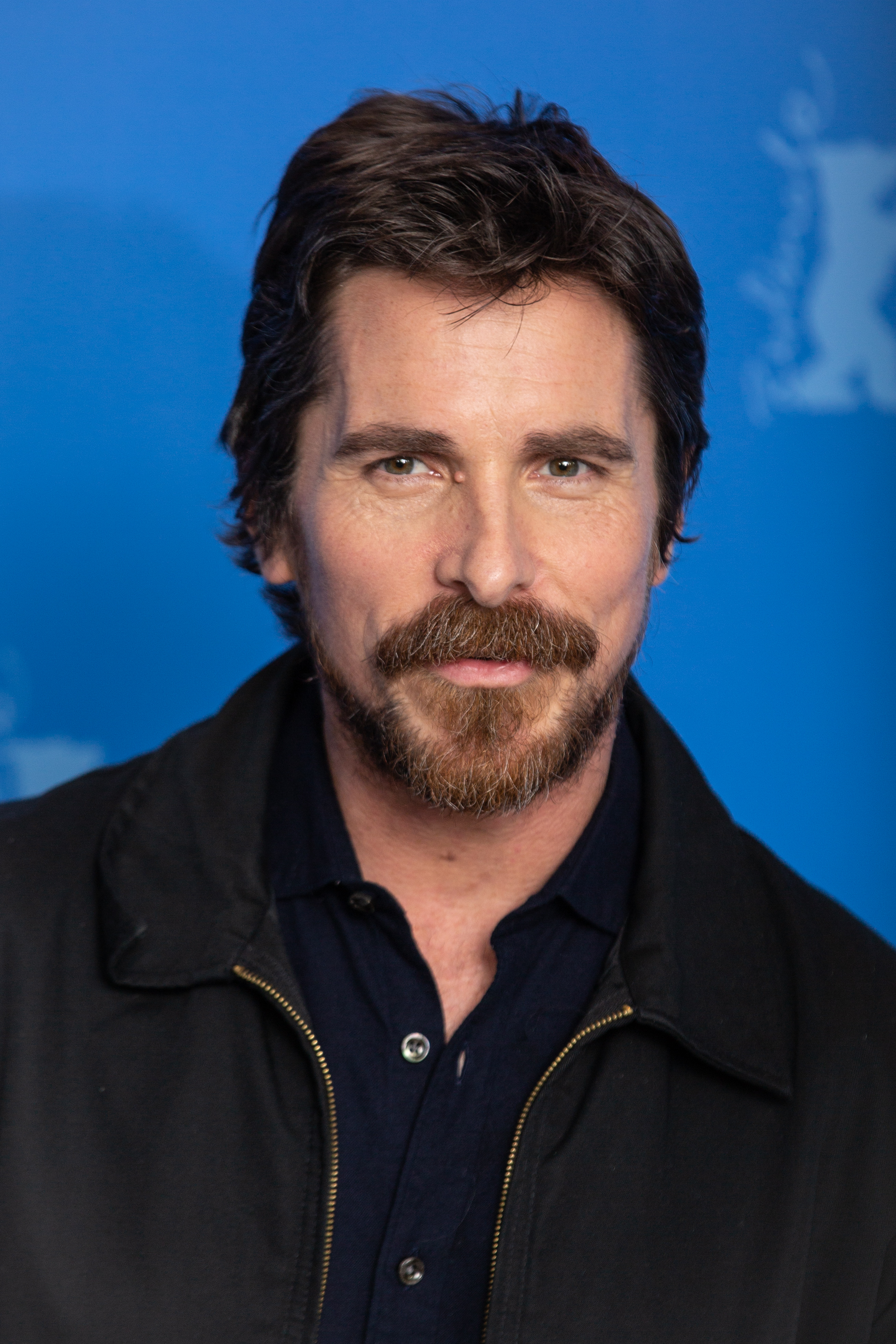
Christian Bale, Best Supporting Actor winner

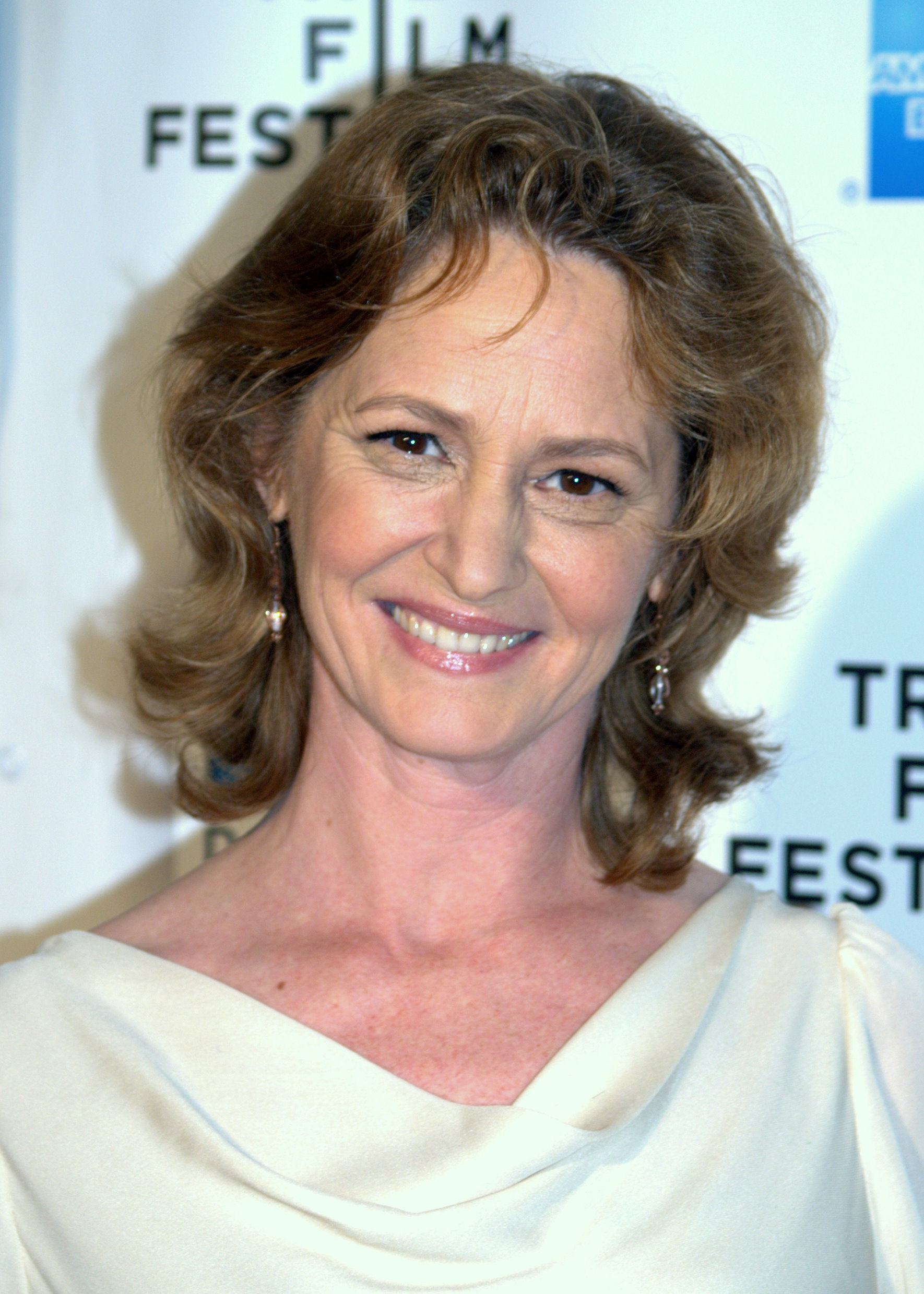
Melissa Leo, Best Supporting Actress winner

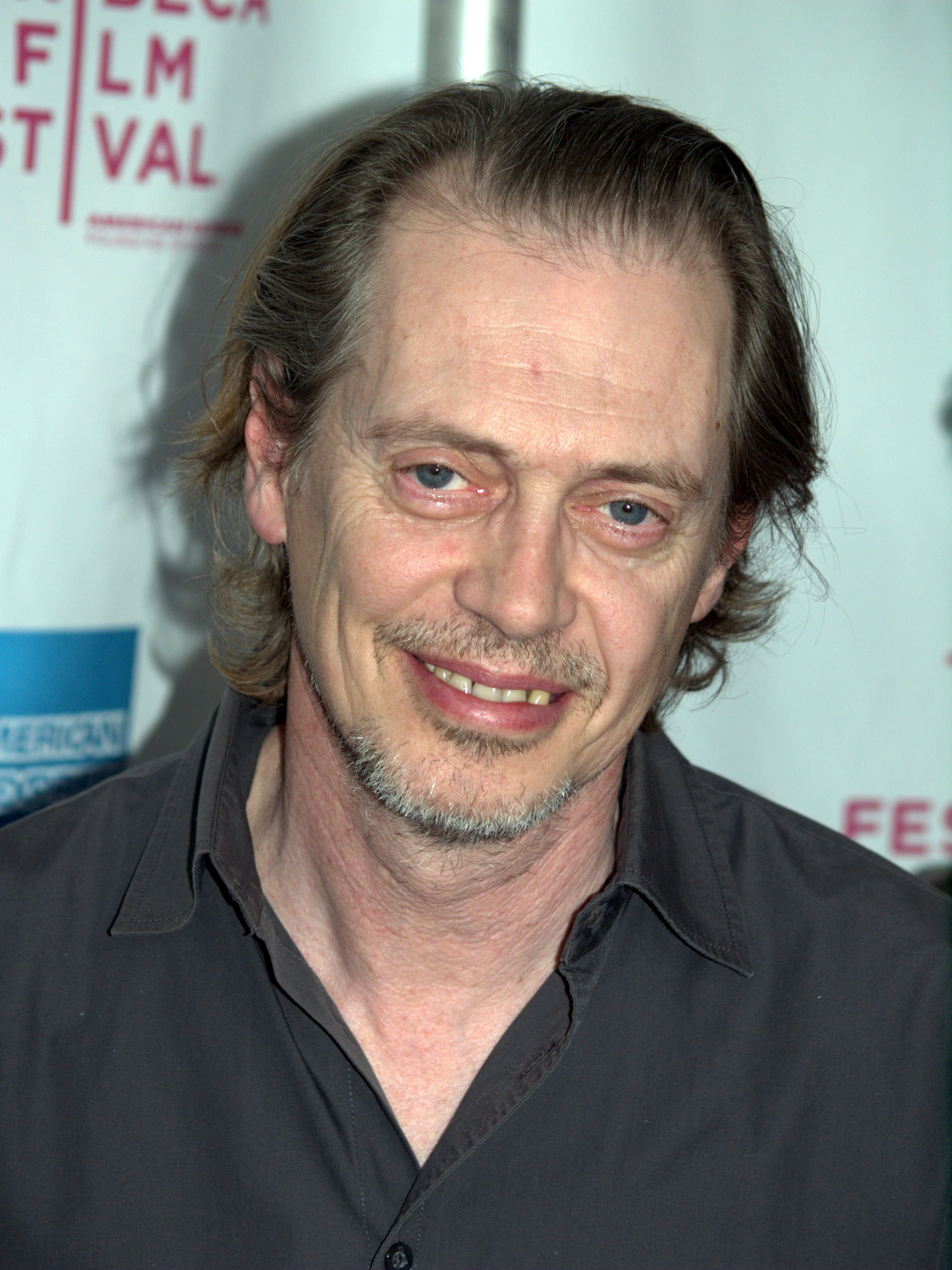
Steve Buscemi, Best Actor in a Television Series – Drama winner

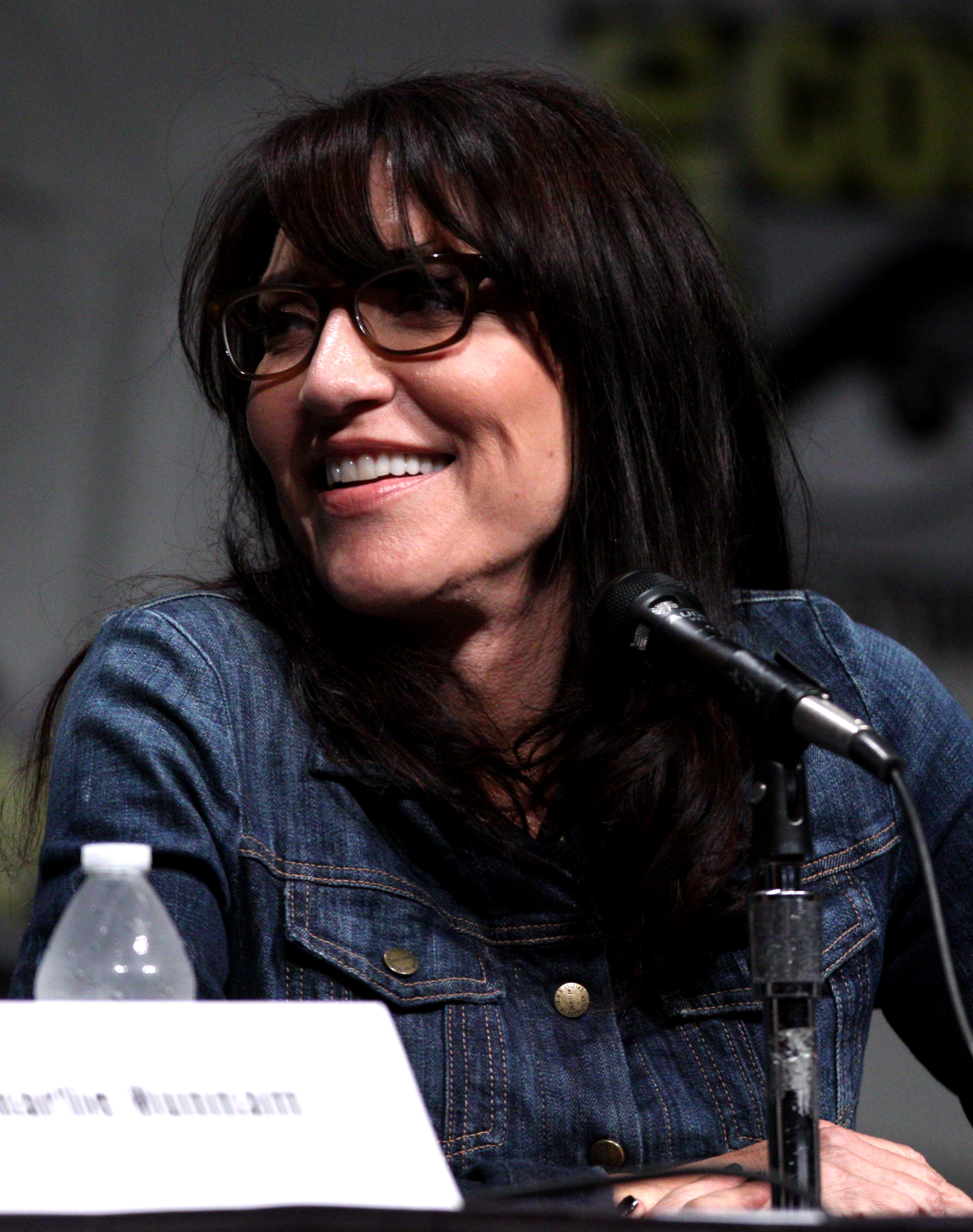
Katey Sagal, Best Actress in a Television Series – Drama winner

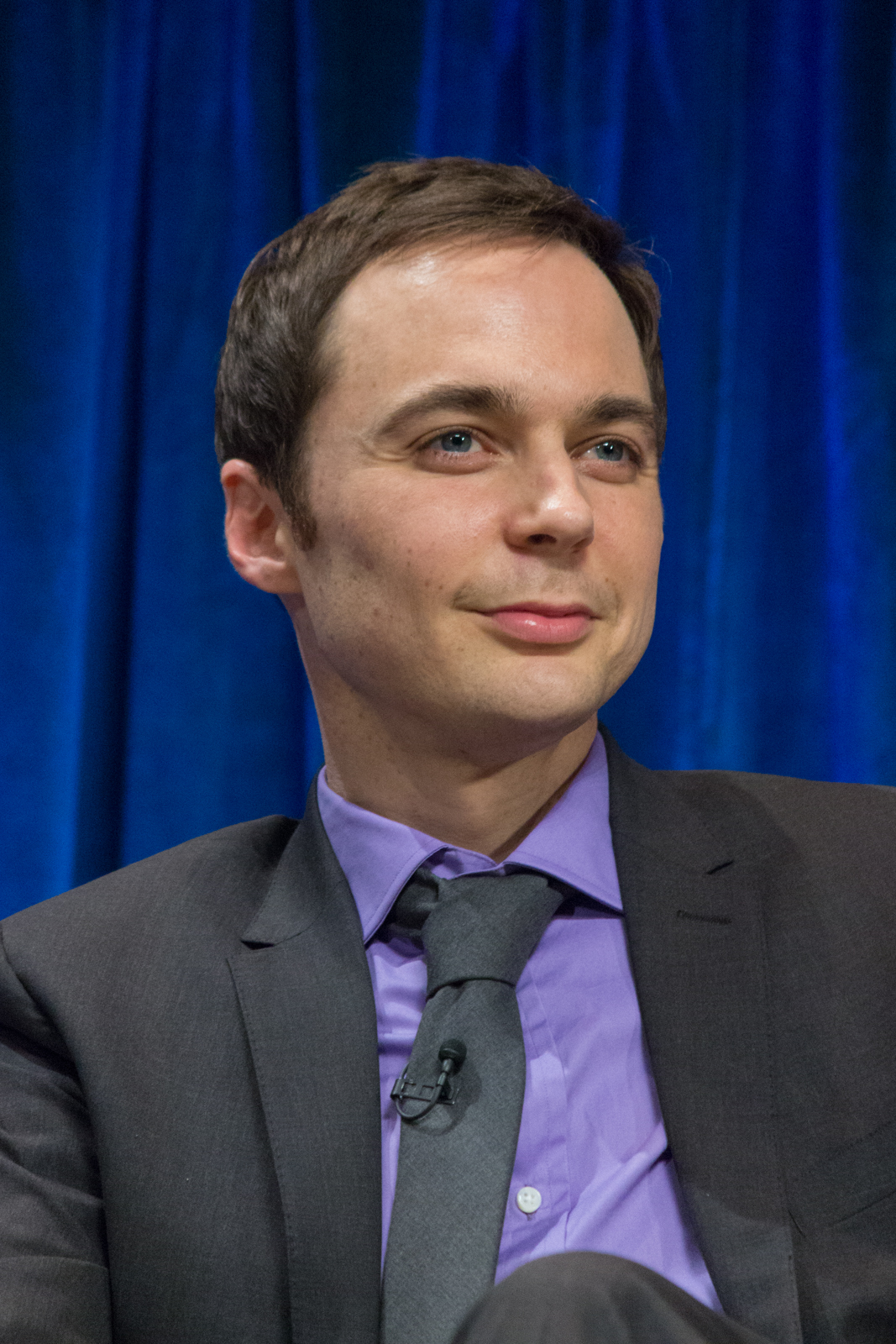
Jim Parsons, Best Actor in a Television Series – Musical or Comedy winner

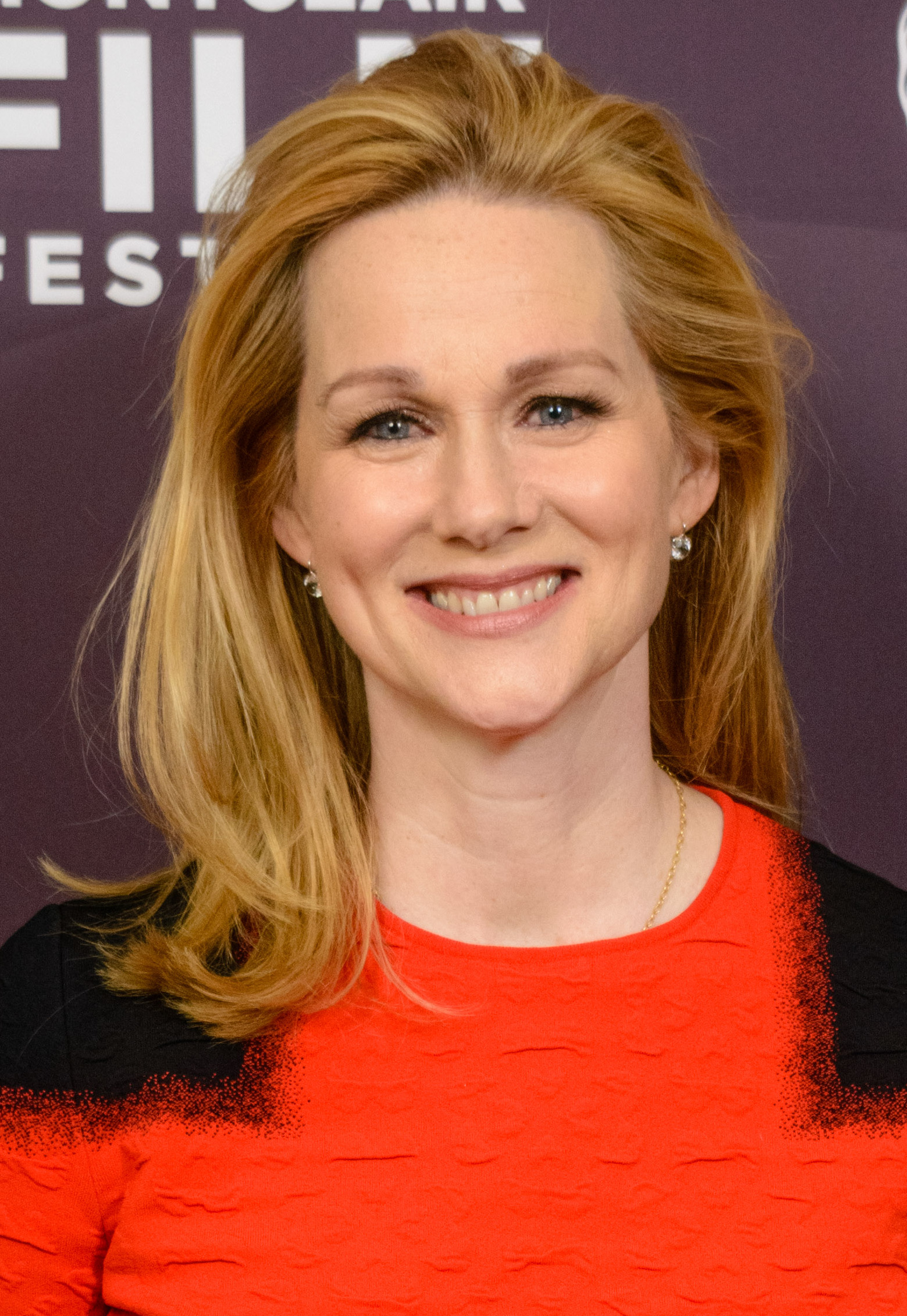
Laura Linney, Best Actress in a Television Series – Musical or Comedy winner

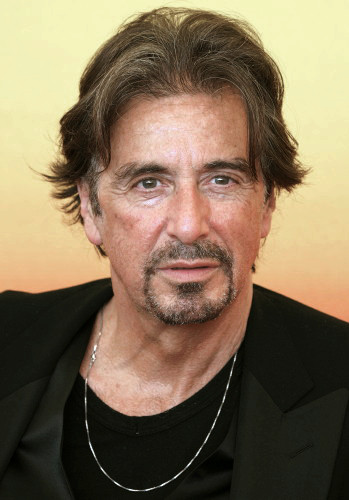
Al Pacino, Best Actor in a Miniseries or Television Film winner

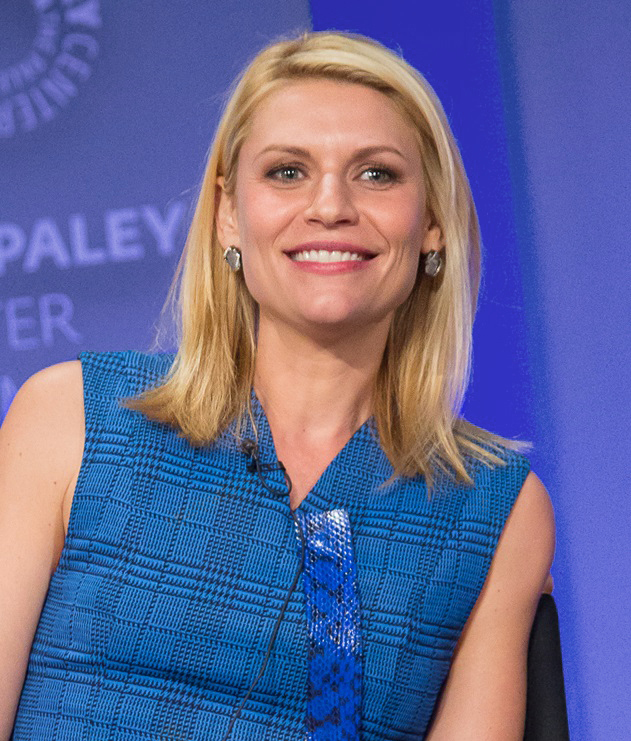
Claire Danes, Best Actress in a Miniseries or Television Film winner

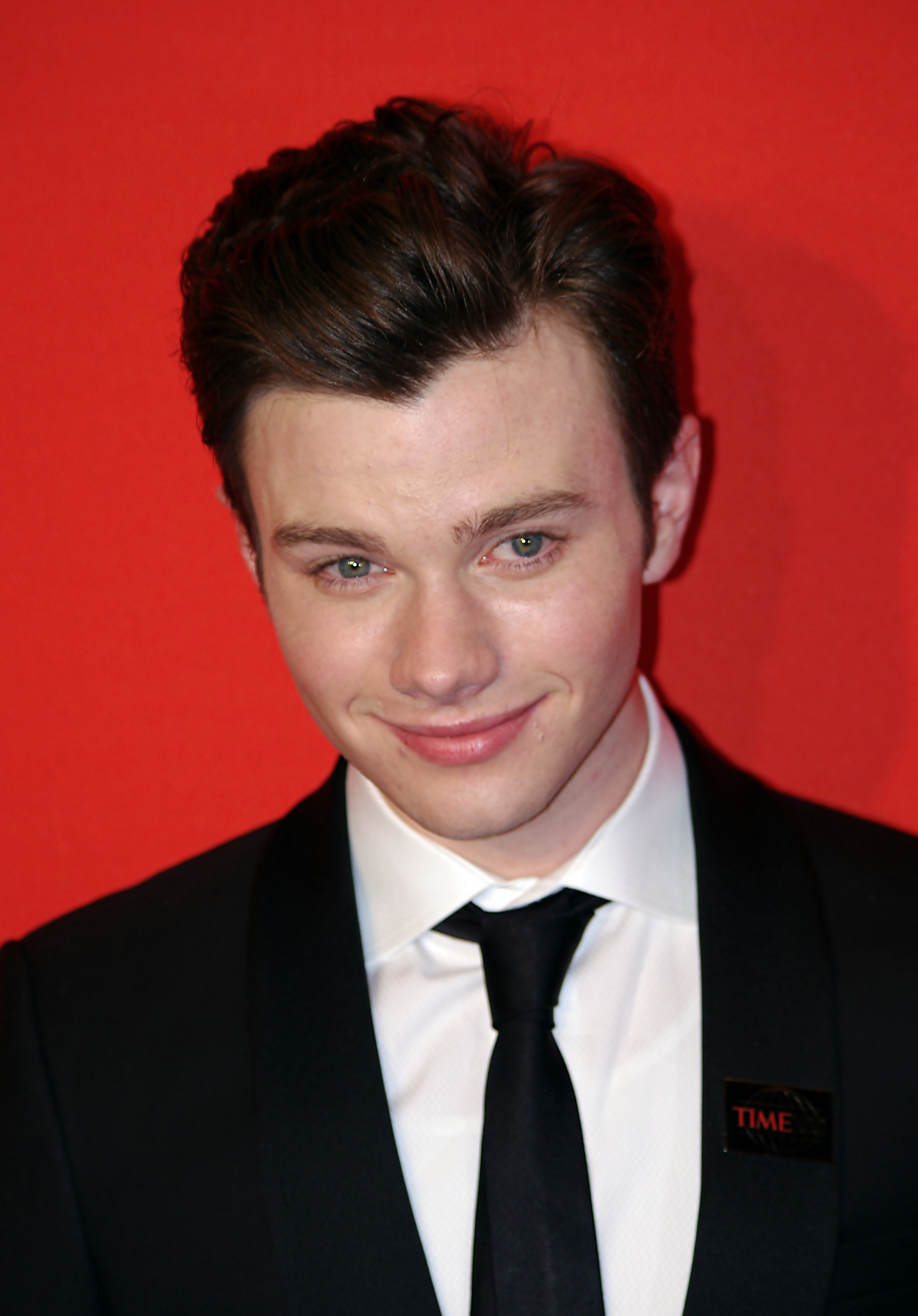
Chris Colfer, Best Supporting Actor in a Series, Miniseries, or Television Film winner

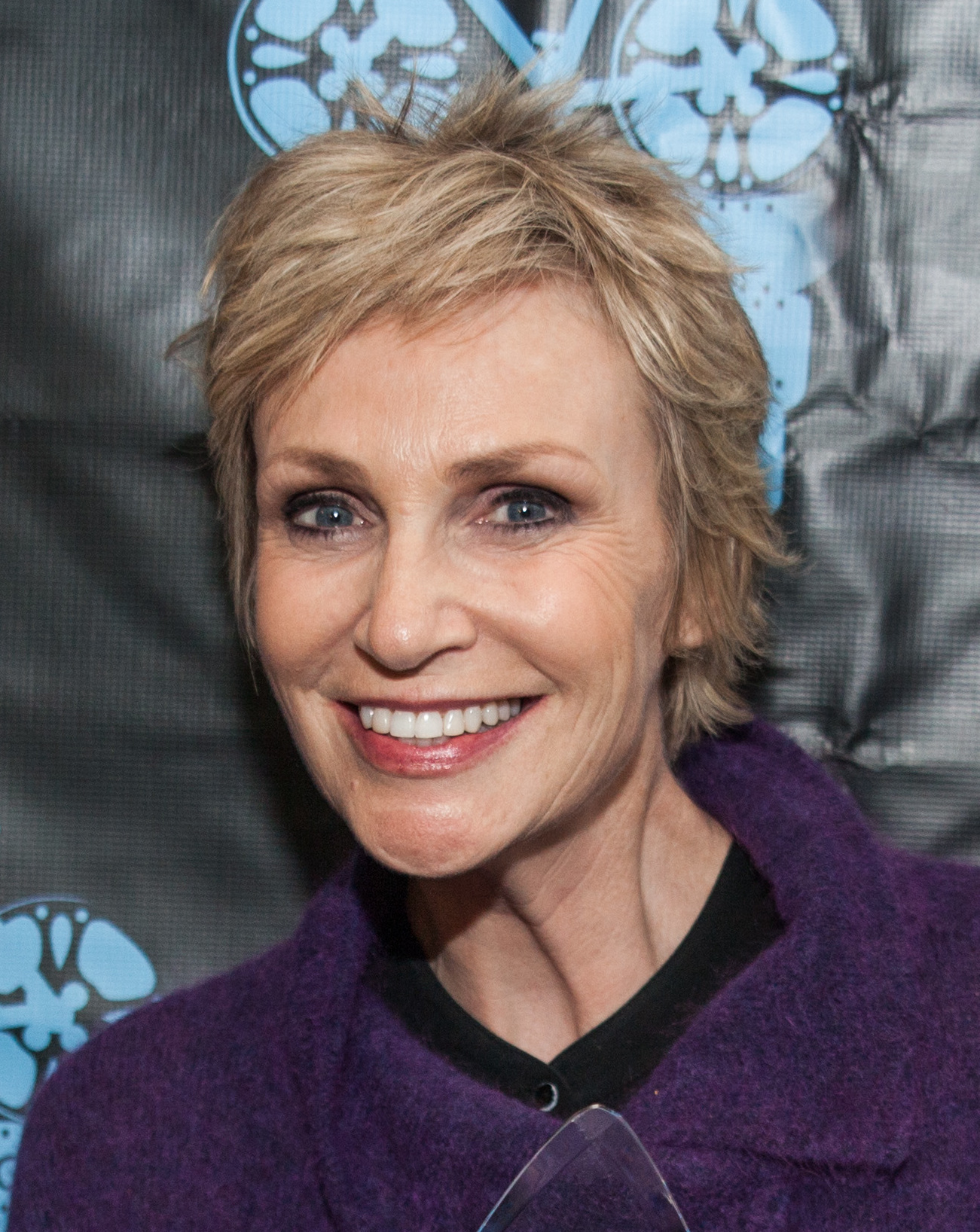
Jane Lynch, Best Supporting Actress in a Series, Miniseries, or Television Film winner

These are the nominees for the 68th Golden Globe Awards. Winners are listed at the top of each list.

=== Film ===
Best Motion Picture
Drama	Musical or Comedy
The Social Network; Black Swan; The Fighter; Inception; The King's Speech	The Kids Are All Right; Alice in Wonderland; Burlesque; Red; The Tourist
Best Performance in a Motion Picture – Drama
Actor	Actress
Colin Firth – The King's Speech as King George VI; Jesse Eisenberg – The Social Network as Mark Zuckerberg; James Franco – 127 Hours as Aron Ralston; Ryan Gosling – Blue Valentine as Dean Pereira; Mark Wahlberg – The Fighter as Micky Ward	Natalie Portman – Black Swan as Nina Sayers / The Swan Queen; Halle Berry – Frankie & Alice as Frankie / Genius / Alice; Nicole Kidman – Rabbit Hole as Becca Corbett; Jennifer Lawrence – Winter's Bone as Ree Dolly; Michelle Williams – Blue Valentine as Cindy Heller
Best Performance in a Motion Picture – Musical or Comedy
Actor	Actress
Paul Giamatti – Barney's Version as Barney Panofsky; Johnny Depp – Alice in Wonderland as Mad Hatter; Johnny Depp – The Tourist as Frank Tupelo; Jake Gyllenhaal – Love & Other Drugs as Jamie Randall; Kevin Spacey – Casino Jack as Jack Abramoff	Annette Bening – The Kids Are All Right as Dr. Nicole "Nic" Allgood; Anne Hathaway – Love & Other Drugs as Maggie Murdock; Angelina Jolie – The Tourist as Elise Ward; Julianne Moore – The Kids Are All Right as Jules Allgood; Emma Stone – Easy A as Olive Penderghast
Supporting Actor	Supporting Actress
Christian Bale – The Fighter as Dicky Eklund; Michael Douglas – Wall Street: Money Never Sleeps as Gordon Gekko; Andrew Garfield – The Social Network as Eduardo Saverin; Jeremy Renner – The Town as James "Jem" Coughlin; Geoffrey Rush – The King's Speech as Lionel Logue	Melissa Leo – The Fighter as Alice Eklund; Amy Adams – The Fighter as Charlene Fleming; Helena Bonham Carter – The King's Speech as Queen Elizabeth; Mila Kunis – Black Swan as Lily / The Black Swan; Jacki Weaver – Animal Kingdom as Janine "Smurf" Cody
Best Director	Best Screenplay
David Fincher – The Social Network; Darren Aronofsky – Black Swan; Tom Hooper – The King's Speech; Christopher Nolan – Inception; David O. Russell – The Fighter	Aaron Sorkin – The Social Network; Simon Beaufoy and Danny Boyle – 127 Hours; Stuart Blumberg and Lisa Cholodenko – The Kids Are All Right; Christopher Nolan – Inception; David Seidler – The King's Speech
Best Original Score	Best Original Song
Trent Reznor, Atticus Ross – The Social Network; Alexandre Desplat – The King's Speech; Danny Elfman – Alice in Wonderland; A. R. Rahman – 127 Hours; Hans Zimmer – Inception	"You Haven't Seen the Last of Me" – Burlesque; "Bound to You" – Burlesque; "Coming Home" – Country Strong; "I See the Light" – Tangled; "There's a Place for Us" – The Chronicles of Narnia: The Voyage of the Dawn Treader
Best Animated Feature Film	Best Foreign Language Film
Toy Story 3; Despicable Me; How to Train Your Dragon; The Illusionist; Tangled	In a Better World • Denmark; Biutiful • Mexico; The Concert • France; The Edge • Russia; I Am Love • Italy

=== Television ===
Best Series
Drama	Musical or Comedy
Boardwalk Empire (HBO); Dexter (Showtime); The Good Wife (CBS); Mad Men (AMC); The Walking Dead (AMC)	Glee (Fox); 30 Rock (NBC); The Big Bang Theory (CBS); The Big C (Showtime); Modern Family (ABC); Nurse Jackie (Showtime)
Best Performance in a Television Series – Drama
Actor	Actress
Steve Buscemi – Boardwalk Empire (HBO) as Nucky Thompson; Bryan Cranston – Breaking Bad (AMC) as Walter White; Michael C. Hall – Dexter (Showtime) as Dexter Morgan; Jon Hamm – Mad Men (AMC) as Don Draper; Hugh Laurie – House (Fox) as Dr. Gregory House	Katey Sagal – Sons of Anarchy (FX) as Gemma Teller Morrow; Julianna Margulies – The Good Wife (CBS) as Alicia Florrick; Elisabeth Moss – Mad Men (AMC) as Peggy Olson; Piper Perabo – Covert Affairs (USA Network) as Annie Walker; Kyra Sedgwick – The Closer (TNT) as Brenda Leigh Johnson
Best Performance in a Television Series – Musical or Comedy
Actor	Actress
Jim Parsons – The Big Bang Theory (CBS) as Dr. Sheldon Cooper; Alec Baldwin – 30 Rock (NBC) as Jack Donaghy; Steve Carell – The Office (NBC) as Michael Scott; Thomas Jane – Hung (HBO) as Ray Drecker; Matthew Morrison – Glee (Fox) as Will Schuester	Laura Linney – The Big C (Showtime) as Cathy Jamison; Toni Collette – United States of Tara (Showtime) as Tara Gregson; Edie Falco – Nurse Jackie (Showtime) as Jackie Peyton; Tina Fey – 30 Rock (NBC) as Liz Lemon; Lea Michele – Glee (Fox) as Rachel Berry
Best Performance in a Miniseries or Television Film
Actor	Actress
Al Pacino – You Don't Know Jack (HBO) as Dr. Jack Kevorkian; Idris Elba – Luther (BBC America) as Detective Chief Inspector John Luther; Ian McShane – The Pillars of the Earth (Starz) as Waleran Bigod; Dennis Quaid – The Special Relationship (HBO) as President Bill Clinton; Édgar Ramírez – Carlos (Sundance TV) as Carlos the Jackal	Claire Danes – Temple Grandin (HBO) as Temple Grandin; Hayley Atwell – The Pillars of the Earth (Starz) as Aliena; Judi Dench – Return to Cranford (PBS) as Matilda "Matty" Jenkyns; Romola Garai – Emma (PBS) as Emma Woodhouse; Jennifer Love Hewitt – The Client List (Lifetime) as Samantha Horton
Best Supporting Performance in a Series, Miniseries, or Television Film
Actor	Actress
Chris Colfer – Glee (Fox) as Kurt Hummel; Scott Caan – Hawaii Five-0 (CBS) as Danny Williams; Chris Noth – The Good Wife (CBS) as Peter Florrick; Eric Stonestreet – Modern Family (ABC) as Cameron Tucker; David Strathairn – Temple Grandin (HBO) as Dr. Carlock	Jane Lynch – Glee (Fox) as Sue Sylvester; Hope Davis – The Special Relationship (HBO) as Hillary Clinton; Kelly Macdonald – Boardwalk Empire (HBO) as Margaret Schroeder; Julia Stiles – Dexter (Showtime) as Lumen Pierce; Sofía Vergara – Modern Family (ABC) as Gloria Delgado-Pritchett
Best Miniseries or Television Film
Carlos (Sundance TV); The Pacific (HBO); The Pillars of the Earth (Starz); Temple Grandin (HBO); You Don't Know Jack (HBO)

== Awards breakdown ==
The following films and programs received multiple nominations:

=== Film ===
Nominations	Film
7	The King's Speech
6	The Fighter
6	The Social Network
4	Black Swan
4	Inception
4	The Kids Are All Right
3	127 Hours
3	Alice in Wonderland
3	Burlesque
3	The Tourist
2	Blue Valentine
2	Love & Other Drugs
2	Tangled

=== Television ===
Nominations	Series
5	Glee
3	30 Rock
3	Boardwalk Empire
3	Dexter
3	The Good Wife
3	Mad Men
3	Modern Family
3	The Pillars of the Earth
3	Temple Grandin
2	The Big Bang Theory
2	The Big C
2	Carlos
2	Nurse Jackie

The following films and programs received multiple wins:

=== Films ===
Wins	Film
4	The Social Network
2	The Fighter
2	The Kids Are All Right

=== Television ===
Wins	Series
3	Glee
2	Boardwalk Empire

== Ceremony ==
=== Presenters ===
- Tim Allen
- Alec Baldwin
- Halle Berry
- Justin Bieber
- Matt Bomer
- Julie Bowen
- Jeff Bridges
- Sandra Bullock
- Steve Carell
- Kaley Cuoco
- Matt Damon
- Michael Douglas
- Robert Downey Jr.
- Zac Efron
- Chris Evans
- Jimmy Fallon
- Jane Fonda
- Megan Fox
- Andrew Garfield
- Joseph Gordon-Levitt
- Tom Hanks
- Garrett Hedlund
- Chris Hemsworth
- Jeremy Irons
- Scarlett Johansson
- January Jones
- Milla Jovovich
- Alicia Keys
- LL Cool J
- Eva Longoria
- Jennifer Lopez
- Leighton Meester
- Helen Mirren
- Julianne Moore
- Robert Pattison
- Michelle Pfeiffer
- Geoffrey Rush
- Kevin Spacey
- Sylvester Stallone
- Hailee Steinfeld
- Tilda Swinton
- Blair Underwood
- Olivia Wilde
- Vanessa Williams
- Bruce Willis

Presenter	Accolade
Kevin Bacon Milla Jovovich	Co-Present Best Performance by an Actor in a Television Series — Drama and Best Television Series — Drama
Alec Baldwin Jennifer Lopez	Co-Present Best Original Song and Best Original Score
Annette Bening	Presents Best Director
Halle Berry	Presents Best Performance by an Actor in a Motion Picture — Musical or Comedy
Justin Bieber Hailee Steinfeld	Co-Present Best Animated Feature Film
Matt Bomer Kaley Cuoco	Co-Present Best Performance by an Actor in a Television Series — Musical or Comedy
Julie Bowen LL Cool J	Co-Present Best Performance by an Actress in a Television Series — Drama
Jeff Bridges	Presents Best Performance by an Actress in a Motion Picture — Drama
Sandra Bullock	Presents Best Performance by an Actor in a Motion Picture — Drama
Steve Carell Tina Fey	Co-Present Best Screenplay
Matt Damon	Honors recipient Robert De Niro with the Cecil B. DeMille Award
Michael Douglas	Presents Best Motion Picture — Drama
Robert Downy, Jr.	Presents Best Performance by an Actress in a Motion Picture — Musical or Comedy
Zac Efron	Introduces the clip The Kids Are All Right
Chris Evans Chris Hemsworth	Co-Present Best Performance by a Supporting Actress — Series, Miniseries or Motion Picture Made for Television
Jimmy Fallon January Jones	Co-Present Best Television Series — Musical or Comedy
Jane Fonda	Introduces the clip Burlesque
Megan Fox	Introduces the clip The Tourist
Andrew Garfield	Introduces the clip The Social Network
Joseph Gordon-Levitt	Introduces the clip Inception
Tom Hanks Tim Allen	Co-Present Best Motion Picture — Musical or Comedy
Garrett Hedlund Leighton Meester	Co-Present Best Performance by a Supporting Actor — Series, Miniseries or Motion Picture Made for Television
Jeremy Irons	Presents Best Performance by a Supporting Actress in a Motion Picture
Scarlett Johansson	Presents Best Performance by a Supporting Actor in a Motion Picture
Alicia Kesy	Introduces the clip Black Swan
Eva Longoria	Introduces HFPA President Philip Burke
Helen Mirren	Introduces the clip The King's Speech
Julianne Moore Kevin Spacey	Co-Present Best Miniseries or Television Film
Robert Pattison Olivia Wilde	Co-Present Best Foreign Language Film
Geoffrey Rush Tilda Swinton	Co-Present Best Performance by an Actor — Miniseries or Television Film and Best Performance by an Actress — Miniseries or Television Film
Sylvester Stallone	Introduces the clip The Fighter
Blair Underwood Vanessa Williams	Co-Present Best Performance by an Actress in a Television Series — Musical or Comedy
Bruce Willis	Introduces the clip Red

=== Cecil B. DeMille Award ===
Robert De Niro

=== Miss Golden Globe ===
Gia Mantegna (daughter of Joe Mantegna & Arlene Mantegna)

== Criticism ==
The three nominations for The Tourist were criticized since the film previously received negative reviews from critics and was nominated in the Musical or Comedy categories despite the fact that it was sold as a thriller film. The nominations for Burlesque, another film with bad reviews, also received outrage after news surfaced that the film's distributor, Sony, had treated Golden Globe voters to an all-expenses-paid trip to Las Vegas, culminating in a concert by Cher, one of the film's stars.

Ricky Gervais's job as host was also met with criticism regarding his roasting of the stars in attendance particularly Mel Gibson, Robert Downey Jr., Bruce Willis, and Angelina Jolie. The Hollywood Foreign Press Association even wrote, "his blunt one-liners targeting big-name celebrities caused anger and resentment in some quarters."

== See also ==
- Hollywood Foreign Press Association
- 83rd Academy Awards
- 63rd Primetime Emmy Awards
- 62nd Primetime Emmy Awards
- 17th Screen Actors Guild Awards
- 64th British Academy Film Awards
- 31st Golden Raspberry Awards
- 65th Tony Awards
- 2010 in film
- 2010 in American television
