= The Fighter =

2010 film by David O. Russell

- Theatrical release poster
- Directed by: David O. Russell
- Screenplay by: Scott Silver; Paul Tamasy; Eric Johnson
- Story by: Keith Dorrington; Paul Tamasy; Eric Johnson
- Produced by: David Hoberman; Todd Lieberman; Ryan Kavanaugh; Mark Wahlberg; Dorothy Aufiero; Paul Tamasy
- Starring: Mark Wahlberg; Christian Bale; Amy Adams; Melissa Leo
- Cinematography: Hoyte van Hoytema
- Edited by: Pamela Martin
- Music by: Michael Brook
- Production companies: Relativity Media; The Weinstein Company; Mandeville Films; Closest to the Hole Productions
- Distributed by: Paramount Pictures (North America); The Weinstein Company (International)
- Release dates: December 6, 2010 (Grauman's Chinese Theatre); December 17, 2010 (United States)
- Running time: 116 minutes
- Country: United States
- Language: English
- Budget: $11-25 million
- Box office: $129 million

The Fighter is a 2010 American biographical sports drama film directed by David O. Russell, and stars Mark Wahlberg (who also produced), Christian Bale, Amy Adams, and Melissa Leo. The film centers on the lives of professional boxer Micky Ward (Wahlberg) and his older half-brother and former boxer Dicky Eklund (Bale). The film was inspired by the 1995 documentary featuring the Eklund-Ward family titled High on Crack Street: Lost Lives in Lowell.

The Fighter premiered at the Grauman's Chinese Theatre on December 6, 2010, and was theatrically released in the United States by Paramount Pictures on December 17, and by The Weinstein Company in international markets. The film grossed $129 million worldwide on a budget of $11–25 million and received positive reviews, with critics praising the cast performances; many commented that Bale's physical transformation, accent, and mannerisms made for one of the greatest performances of that year.

The Fighter earned Bale and Leo awards for Best Supporting Actor and Best Supporting Actress at various ceremonies including the Academy Awards, the Critics' Choice Awards, the Golden Globe Awards and the Screen Actors Guild Awards, in addition to nominations at the British Academy Film Awards.

== Plot ==
Micky Ward is an American welterweight boxer from Lowell, Massachusetts. Managed by his mother Alice, Micky is trained by his older half-brother Dicky Eklund, a former boxer whose peak of success was going the distance with Sugar Ray Leonard in 1978. Addicted to crack cocaine, Dicky is being filmed for an HBO documentary he believes will be about his "comeback".

On the night of an undercard fight in Atlantic City, Micky's scheduled opponent is ill, and substitute Mike Mungin is a full twenty pounds heavier, almost three weight classes above Micky. His mother and brother assure him that Mungin is out of shape, but they arrive at the fight to find he is in top condition, soundly defeating Micky. Retreating from the world, Micky strikes up a relationship with bartender Charlene Fleming.

After several weeks, Alice arranges another fight for Micky, who is considering an offer to be paid to train in Las Vegas. He is supported by Charlene and his father George, angering Alice and his seven sisters, but Dicky says he will match the offer to keep Micky with the family. Desperate for money, Dicky has his girlfriend act as a prostitute and robs her clients by impersonating a police officer, but is interrupted by the actual police. He is chased down and beaten, and an officer brutally breaks Micky's hand when he tries to intervene. Both brothers are arrested and Dicky is sentenced to prison, while Micky is released and washes his hands of Dicky.

HBO airs the documentary, which the incarcerated Dicky and his family are horrified to see is called Crack in America, depicting how Dicky's life and career have been ruined by his addiction. Dicky commits to bettering himself in prison, while Micky resumes training as his hand heals. George finds a new manager, Sal Lanano, and persuades Micky to return to boxing without the involvement of Alice or Dicky. Alice and her daughters confront Charlene and Micky, who agrees with Charlene that his mother and brother have done more damage to his career than good.

Micky regains his confidence in a string of minor bouts, and is offered a major fight against an undefeated up-and-comer. He visits his brother in prison, and Dicky advises him how best to work his opponent, but Micky accuses him of selfishly trying to relive his own failed career. Micky is nearly overwhelmed during the match, but follows his brother's advice and triumphs, unexpectedly earning a shot at the title.

Released from prison and eight months sober, Dicky returns home to his family and young son, but Micky has promised his team not to involve his brother. A family argument ensues and Micky chastises both sides, before Charlene and his trusted trainer Mickey O'Keefe leave in disgust. Alice urges Micky to spar with Dicky, but Micky angrily knocks him down and chides his mother for having always favored Dicky. Returning to his crack house, Dicky cuts ties with his former friends and seeks out Charlene, telling her that Micky needs both of them.

The team reconciles and arrives in London for the title fight against welterweight champion Shea Neary. With Dicky's guidance and his family watching, Micky scores another upset victory and wins the welterweight title. Dicky credits his brother as the creator of his own success, and an epilogue reveals that Micky retired after a remarkable career and married Charlene, while Dicky remains a local legend.

== Cast ==
- Mark Wahlberg as Micky Ward: Wahlberg elected to star in the film due to his friendship with Ward, with whom he shares an inner-city working class Massachusetts upbringing in a family with eight siblings. Wahlberg also was a huge fan of Ward's, calling him a "local sports hero". The actor was also attracted to the film's central theme, an ordinary person in "an against-all-odds story", which he previously explored in Invincible (2006). To mimic Ward's habits and mannerisms, Wahlberg had him "on set, watching me every single day". During pre-production, the Ward brothers temporarily moved into Wahlberg's home. To add to the film's realism, Wahlberg refused a stunt double and took real punches during the fight scenes, which resulted in him nearly getting his nose broken a couple of times. Wahlberg underwent a strict bodybuilding exercise regimen, dedicating over four years of training to obtain a muscular physique to convincingly play Ward. "The last six movies I did I was also secretly preparing for The Fighter at the same time", the actor continued, "so I would leave three hours early for work and go to the gym and spend three hours there. I would bring the trainers with me on every movie that I did." His uncertainty over the film's development was overruled by his persistence to get the film made. "There were certainly times where I would wake up at 4:30 in the morning, you know, my trainer would ring the bell, and, 'Oh God', I'm like, 'I better get this movie made'. You know, 'Kill somebody if I don't get this movie made.'" Wahlberg hired Freddie Roach as his boxing trainer, helping the actor model Ward's specific fighting style. The last two years of Wahlberg's training resulted in the construction of a "dream gym" in his house for daily use, with a personal boxing ring. He received additional boxing preparation from Manny Pacquiao.
- Christian Bale as Dick "Dicky" Eklund: After both Brad Pitt and Matt Damon dropped out due to scheduling conflicts, Eminem was talked to and considered for the role of Eklund, but he ultimately wasn't cast due to recording conflicts with his music. Wahlberg suggested Bale for the role after meeting the actor at a preschool their daughters both attended. Given Eklund's drug addiction, Bale had to lose weight, which he found easy as he had lost 63 pounds in 2003 for The Machinist (2004). Bale researched the part by taking notes on Eklund's mannerisms and recording conversations for the character's distinctive Boston accent. Director David O. Russell believed Bale's task involved far more than mimicry. "Dicky has a whole rhythm to him, a music. Christian had to understand how his mind works." Russell and Eklund were both impressed by Bale's dedication to staying in character throughout filming.
- Amy Adams as Charlene Fleming, Ward's real-life girlfriend and wife: Russell said of the actress: "There are very few things that a director can have at his disposal better than an actress who's dying to break type and is extremely motivated to break type. Amy was extremely motivated to play a sexy bitch, and that's who the character of Charlene is. ... She said: 'As long as it happens between action and cut, I'll do anything." And I said: 'That's my kind of actress.' I loved that she had that attitude."
- Melissa Leo as Alice Eklund-Ward, mother of both fighters and their seven siblings, all sisters.
- Jack McGee as George Ward, Micky's father.
- Frank Renzulli as Sal Lanano
- Mickey O'Keefe as himself, a Lowell, Massachusetts police sergeant who was Ward's real-life trainer. O'Keefe, who had never acted, was hesitant at first, but Wahlberg told him he could do it because as a police officer, he has to act and think fast on his feet.
- Jenna Lamia as Sherri "The Baby" Ward
- Bianca Hunter as Cathy "Pork" Eklund
- Erica McDermott as Cindy "Tar" Eklund, one of Mickey and Dickey's sisters
- Sugar Ray Leonard as himself, making a cameo appearance as a guest commentator at the Ward/Mungin match
- Kate O'Brien as Phyllis Eklund, Mickey's sister
- Alison Folland as Laurie Carroll, Micky's ex, with whom she shares a daughter Kasie.
- Anders Meader as Security Guard
- Bruce Sullivan as Prison Security Guard

== Production ==
=== Development ===
Scout Productions acquired the life rights of boxer Micky Ward and his brother, Dick Eklund, in July 2003. Eric Johnson and Paul Tamasy were also hired to write the screenplay, which was rewritten by Lewis Colick. In an interview with producer Todd Lieberman, he revealed that rapper Eminem fresh off the success of 8 Mile (2002) was originally the first choice for the role of Micky Ward, however Eminem turned the offer down. Matt Damon was also considered for the role of Micky Ward. Mark Wahlberg joined the production in early 2005, with the intention of doing Ward's life story "justice. We don't want to do any over-the-top, unrealistic fight scenes." The Fighter had been a longtime passion project for Wahlberg, who was a fan of Ward's since his youth growing up in Boston. Paramount Pictures, the United States distributor of the film, hired Paul Attanasio to rewrite Collick's draft in February 2007 in an attempt to emphasize the themes of brotherhood and redemption. Hoping to start production in Massachusetts in June 2007, Wahlberg had Martin Scorsese read the screenplay, hoping he would direct. Scorsese turned down the offer, finding the Massachusetts-setting redundant after having finished The Departed (2006). The actor cited Scorsese's Raging Bull (1980) as an influence for The Fighter, but Scorsese was not interested in directing another boxing film. Darren Aronofsky was hired to direct in March 2007, with Scott Silver rewriting the script in September 2007. Attanasio was brought back in as a script doctor film prior to shooting.

"I’ve seen every boxing movie ever made. I’m also a huge fight fan. I fought a little bit when I was younger. Nobody in my opinion, and some of the greatest movies ever made – you talk Raging Bull and Rocky I saw 30 times – but the fighting just wasn't as realistic as what we hope to achieve and accomplish in this movie."

— Mark Wahlberg in an October 2007 interview

Damon signed on to play Dick Eklund, but he later dropped out due to commitments to other projects and was replaced with Brad Pitt. Production proceeded with filming set to begin October 2008 and Christian Bale replaced Brad Pitt. By then Aronofsky had dropped out to work on MGM's RoboCop (2014), followed by Black Swan (2010). After Pitt and Aronofsky dropped out, Wahlberg signed on as a producer to switch the film as a big budget studio picture to an indie film. At one point, Catherine Hardwicke expressed interest in directing, but was told by producers the film had to be directed by a man. Wahlberg and Bale chose David O. Russell as Aronofsky's replacement. Wahlberg had also starred in Russell's Three Kings (1999) and I Heart Huckabees (2004). Aronofsky was given an executive producer credit for his contributions on The Fighter, and was enthusiastic to have Russell as the director. In April 2009, Relativity Media stepped up to entirely finance the film, selling the international distribution rights to the Weinstein Company (TWC) a month later. The Fighter began principal photography on July 13, 2009, in a 33-day shooting schedule. The budget was reportedly $11 million, although Brad Grey from Paramount disputed that figure and other sources put the budget at $25 million. The production used Massachusetts' film tax credits to cover parts of the film's cost.

=== Filming ===
Principal photography took place on location in Ward's hometown of Lowell, Massachusetts. Its boxing matches were shot at the Tsongas Center at UMass Lowell, and gym scenes at Arthur Ramalho's West End Gym, one of the real-life facilities where Ward had trained. The boxing-match footage was created "in big, choreographed sections that were taken directly from [video of] Micky's actual fights", said Russell. "And we used the actual commentary from [HBO's] Larry Merchant, Roy Jones Jr., and Jim Lampley." Russell used "[t]he actual cameras from that era. [They were] a sort of Beta [video-format] camera that gave a very certain look, and we actually hired the director from HBO and his crew who had done those fights" to replicate them shot-for-shot.

=== Comparison to actual events ===
- The film has Ward on a losing streak coming into the 1988 Mike Mungin fight. In reality, Ward was 18–1 and on a four-fight winning streak when he fought Mungin. Ward's four-fight losing streak actually took place in 1990–91.
- In the film, Ward is knocked down in round six of the Neary fight. In reality, Ward was not knocked down in that fight.
- The film has Ward's career record as 30–7, with 20 KOs, as he fights Neary. In reality, his record at that time was 34–9 with 25 KOs.
- The film depicts Ward taking a severe beating in the Mungin fight. In reality, the fight went the full ten rounds and Mungin won by very narrow decision: 96–93, 95–94, 95–94.
- In the film, during Ward's fight with Alfonso Sanchez, which took place on April 4, 1997, Ward's entrance song is "The Warrior's Code" by Dropkick Murphys. However, that song was not released until 2005 on their album of the same name.

== Release ==
To promote the film, Wahlberg appeared on the cover of Sports Illustrated and Men's Fitness, and Bale on Esquire, in November 2010. An advanced charity premiere took place in Lowell, Massachusetts, the setting of The Fighter, on December 9, a day before the film's scheduled national release.

=== Home media ===
The Fighter was released in a Blu-ray/DVD/Digital Copy combo pack and standard DVD in the United States on March 15, 2011.

== Reception ==
=== Box office ===
The Fighter grossed $93.6 million in United States and Canada and in other territories it collected $35.5 million, for a worldwide total of $129 million; the film made a profit over its $25 million budget.

=== Critical response ===
Review aggregation website Rotten Tomatoes gives The Fighter a rating of 91% based on reviews from 256 critics, with an average rating of 7.8/10. The site's critical consensus reads: "Led by a trio of captivating performances from Mark Wahlberg, Christian Bale, and Amy Adams, The Fighter is a solidly entertaining, albeit predictable, entry in the boxing drama genre." Metacritic gives the film an average score of 79 out of 100, based on 41 critics, indicating "generally favorable reviews". Audiences polled by CinemaScore gave the film an A− grade.

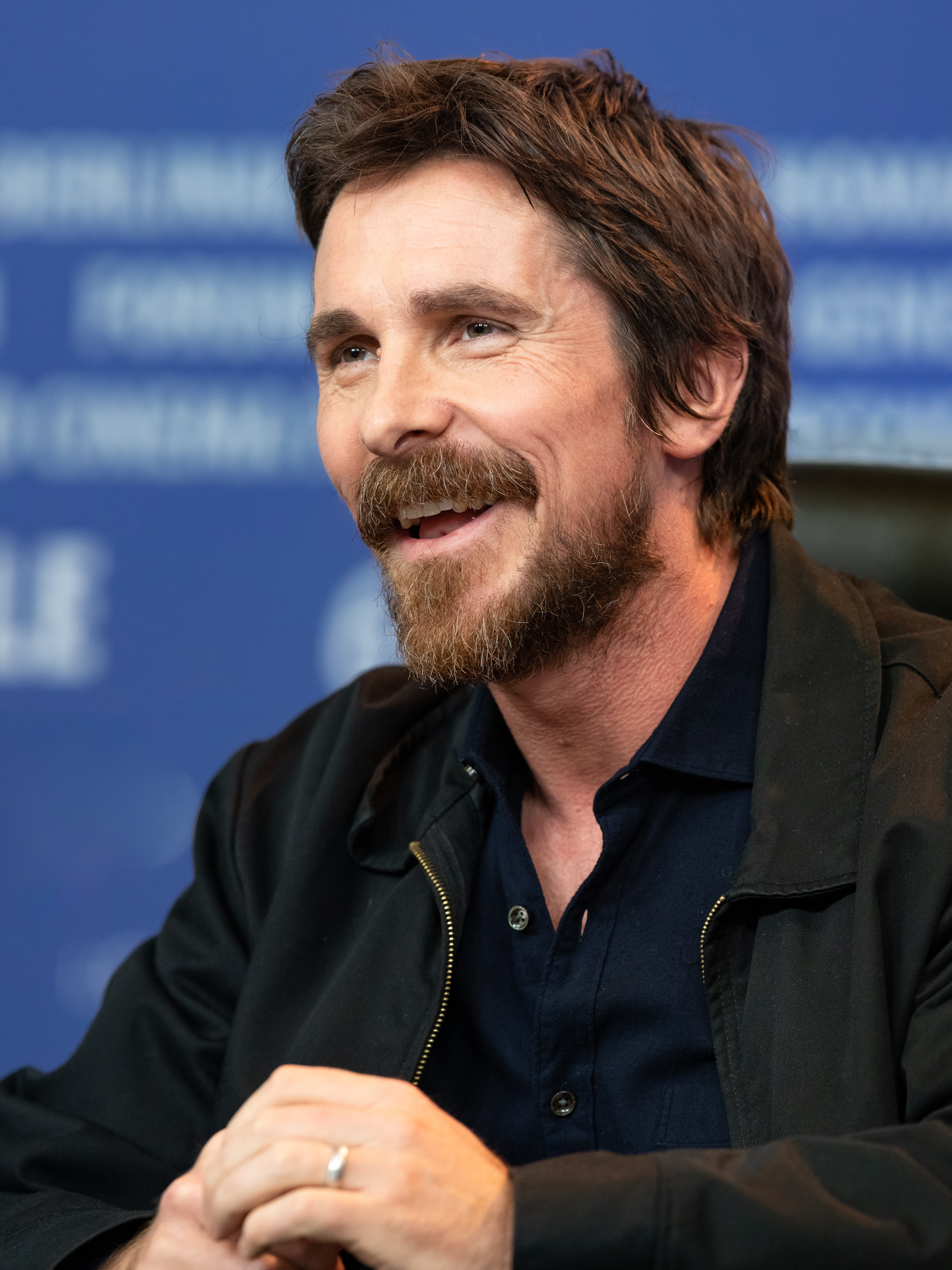
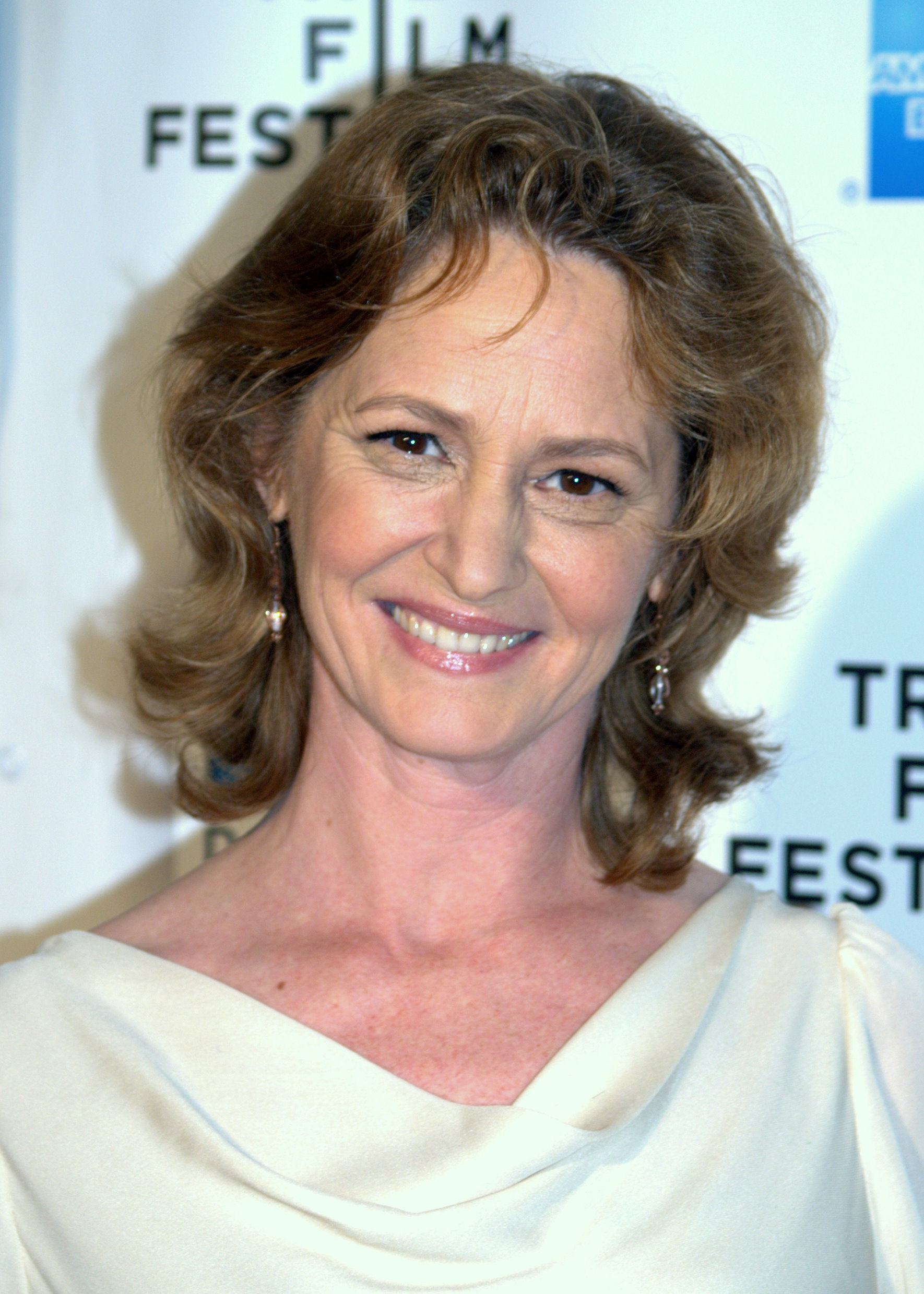
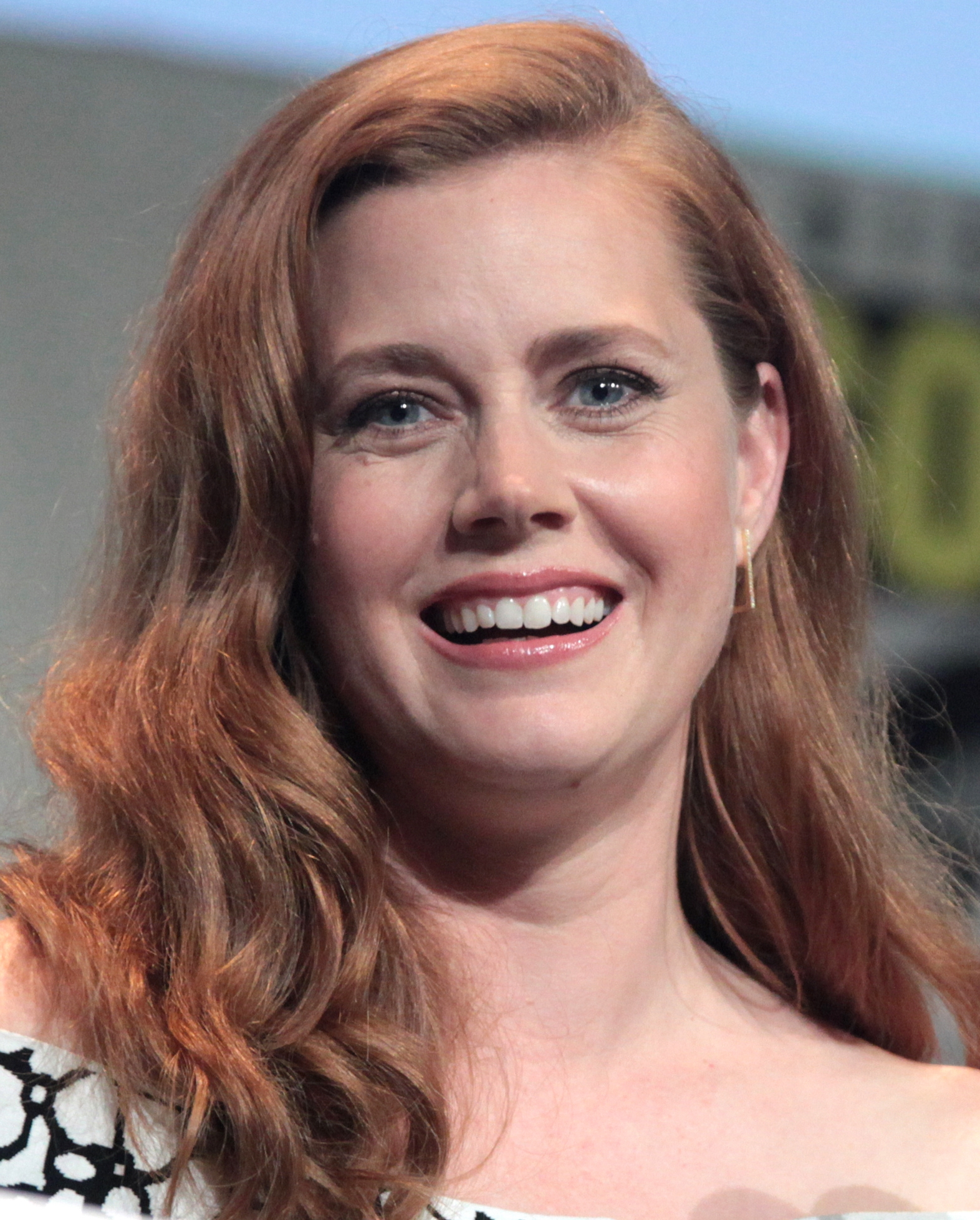
The performances of Christian Bale, Melissa Leo and Amy Adams garnered critical acclaim, earning them all Academy Award nominations, with the first being nominated for Best Supporting Actor and the latter two being nominated for Best Supporting Actress, with Bale and Leo winning their categories.

Sports Illustrated dubbed the film the best sports film of the decade, and "one of the best since Martin Scorsese backlit Robert De Niro's Jake LaMotta in Raging Bull". Richard Corliss of Time magazine named Christian Bale's performance one of the Top 10 Movie Performances of 2010, saying "In a little festival of tart, savory performances, notably from Melissa Leo as the boys' mother and Amy Adams as Micky's girlfriend, Bale shines the brightest, because he knows that no character, however depraved his status, is only a monster. He finds beauty in the beast".

Several critics commented that underdeveloped characters, particularly those of Micky and Alice, was the main weakness of the film. Roger Ebert praised the performances of Wahlberg, Bale, Leo, and Adams, but concluded, "Because we aren't deeply invested in Micky, we don't care as much as we should, and the film ends on a note that should be triumph but feels more like simple conclusion." The Hollywood Reporter's Kirk Honeycutt expressed, "The most luminous personality in the film belongs to Adams' Charlene. She too is a woman who takes charge but she does it through strength of character and love. Her bad-girl days are behind her so she understands a thing or two about comebacks: They only work if you see no other option."

Peter Debruge of Variety wrote, "If 'The Fighter' feels like kind of a mess, lurching from one scene to the next as if the film itself has taken a few hits to the head, that's not entirely a bad thing. Since the story ends well before Micky's career-defining showdown with Arturo Gatti, it's just as well that lunatic setpieces allow talents such as Leo — whose wickedly over-the-top turn disguises Alice's cartoonish two-dimensionality — to upstage anything Micky accomplishes in the ring." Though Debruge opined the film is an entertaining one, he said "what’s missing are stakes and soul, with the director's attention split between working-class elegy and white-trash caricature, but missing the big picture." In a mixed review, Eric Kohn of IndieWire commented the film plays "as if Russell and screenwriters Scott Silver, Paul Tamasy and Eric Johnson couldn’t decide if they wanted to go the 'Rocky' route and emphasize the sport's brutal nature or play up the family's larger relationship issues".

=== Accolades ===
The film received seven Academy Award nominations, winning two with Best Supporting Actor for Bale and Best Supporting Actress for Leo, marking the first film to win both awards since Hannah and Her Sisters in 1986. The film was nominated for six Golden Globe Awards: Best Picture (Drama), Best Actor (Drama) for Wahlberg, Best Supporting Actress for Leo and Adams, Best Supporting Actor for Bale, and a nomination for Best Director for Russell. The film received three Chicago Film Critics award nominations: Best Supporting Actor for Bale, and Best Supporting Actress nominations for Adams and Leo. Bale won a Satellite Award, the Critics' Choice Award, the Golden Globe for Best Supporting Actor, and the National Board of Review Award for Best Supporting Actor. Leo won the Golden Globe for Best Supporting Actress.

Ceremony	Category	Name	Result
Academy Awards	Best Picture	David Hoberman, Todd Lieberman and Mark Wahlberg	Nominated
Academy Awards	Best Director	David O. Russell	Nominated
Academy Awards	Best Supporting Actor	Christian Bale	Won
Academy Awards	Best Supporting Actress	Amy Adams	Nominated
Academy Awards	Best Supporting Actress	Melissa Leo	Won
Academy Awards	Best Original Screenplay	Scott Silver, Paul Tamasy, Eric Johnson & Keith Dorrington	Nominated
Academy Awards	Best Film Editing	Pamela Martin	Nominated
BAFTA Awards	Best Supporting Actor	Christian Bale	Nominated
BAFTA Awards	Best Supporting Actress	Amy Adams	Nominated
BAFTA Awards	Best Original Screenplay	Scott Silver, Paul Tamasy, Eric Johnson & Keith Dorrington	Nominated
Broadcast Film Critics	Best Picture		Nominated
Broadcast Film Critics	Best Supporting Actor	Christian Bale	Won
Broadcast Film Critics	Best Supporting Actress	Amy Adams	Nominated
Broadcast Film Critics	Best Supporting Actress	Melissa Leo	Won
Broadcast Film Critics	Best Acting Ensemble		Won
Broadcast Film Critics	Best Original Screenplay	Scott Silver and Paul Tamasy, Eric Johnson & Keith Dorrington	Nominated
Directors Guild of America Awards	Best Director	David O. Russell	Nominated
ESPY Awards	Best Sports Movie		Won
Golden Globe Awards	Best Picture – Drama		Nominated
Golden Globe Awards	Best Director	David O. Russell	Nominated
Golden Globe Awards	Best Actor – Drama	Mark Wahlberg	Nominated
Golden Globe Awards	Best Supporting Actor	Christian Bale	Won
Golden Globe Awards	Best Supporting Actress	Amy Adams	Nominated
Golden Globe Awards	Best Supporting Actress	Melissa Leo	Won
Screen Actors Guild Awards	Best Acting Ensemble		Nominated
Screen Actors Guild Awards	Best Supporting Actor	Christian Bale	Won
Screen Actors Guild Awards	Best Supporting Actress	Amy Adams	Nominated
Screen Actors Guild Awards	Best Supporting Actress	Melissa Leo	Won

== Sequel ==
In 2011, Wahlberg was involved in developing a sequel, The Fighter 2, which would focus on the legendary fight trilogy between Ward and Arturo Gatti. Russell was on board to write the film. In 2013, Jerry Ferrara signed on to play Gatti. In 2015, producer Todd Lieberman came out with a statement the sequel is far from over.

== See also ==
- List of boxing films
