= High on Crack Street: Lost Lives in Lowell =

- Directed by: Jon Alpert; MaryAnn DeLeo; Richard Farrell
- Written by: Jon Alpert; MaryAnn DeLeo; Richard Farrell
- Produced by: HBO, DCTV
- Starring: Dicky Eklund; Gary (Boo-Boo) Giuffrida; Brenda
- Edited by: Jon Alpert; MaryAnn DeLeo; John Custodio
- Release date: 8 August 1995
- Running time: 60 minutes
- Country: United States
- Language: English

High on Crack Street: Lost Lives in Lowell is a 1995 American documentary film directed by Richard Farrell, Maryann DeLeo and Jon Alpert. It was a co-production of HBO and DCTV, produced by Farrell, DeLeo, and Alpert. It aired on HBO as part of its series America Undercover. The documentary takes place about 20 miles northwest of Boston in the economically depressed former mill city of Lowell, Massachusetts.

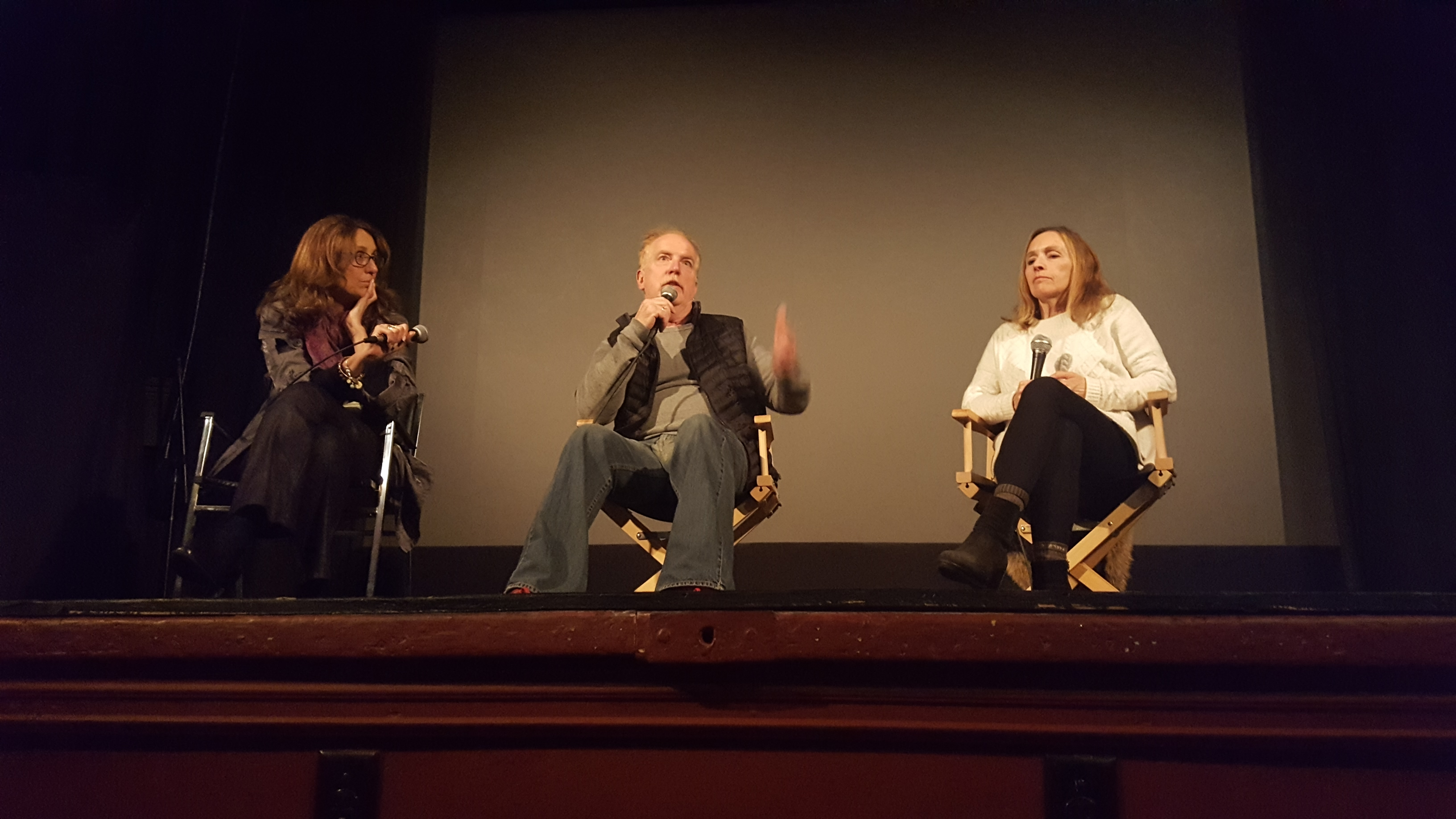
Deb Becker of WBUR-FM, Richard Farrell and MaryAnn DeLeo at IFFBoston 2016

== Synopsis ==
Over eighteen months, a documentary crew follows Lowell, Massachusetts natives Dicky Eklund, Gary "Boo-Boo" Giuffrida, and Brenda in their daily exploits to get high on crack cocaine.

Once the United States' first planned textile town, Lowell fell on hard times after the mills' relocation to the South. Local computer company Wang Laboratories brought some prosperity in the 1970s and 1980s, but its closure in the 1990s caused a significant reversal. As a result, most of the population was left unemployed or impoverished.

Brenda, a prostitute, contemplates abortion after learning she is pregnant, with the father implied to be either on-again-off-again boyfriend Mike, or Boo Boo, who she says has been pimping her out. Whatever money she earns is spent on drugs, while a conversation with her parents leads to her abandoning an attempt at detox rehab for the baby. It is later revealed that Brenda's parents forced her to have an abortion at fifteen, leaving her feeling like she murdered the child.

While she eventually does go into detox, Brenda loses the will to complete the program and walks out, as she had six times before. She later goes missing, prompting a panicked Boo Boo to file a missing person's report. The police eventually locate her but do not tell Boo Boo her location per Brenda's wishes, only that "she's had the child and straightened her life out."

Dicky, a once-promising boxer most famous for going up against Sugar Ray Leonard in 1978, struggles to make a comeback. For the sake of his young son, he tries to prevent his habit and the crimes he commits to feed it from destroying his life. He ultimately ends up being arrested on felony charges. While awaiting trial, his mother sets out to raise $5,000 in bail money at a local VFW benefit. A fight breaks out between spectators during the event, and the bail is not raised.

Boo Boo starts shooting cocaine intravenously. After testing positive for HIV, he starts turning his life around by getting a job as a deliveryman for a donut shop and reconnecting with his family. His efforts are undone when a traffic violation leads to the revelation that he was driving with no license, which leads to him being unemployed. He meets with Dicky on his last day out before going to jail, the two of them getting high together. In a final interview, Boo Boo reflects on how he is the only one of the three left and hopes Brenda is doing well with her new life.

A textual epilogue reveals that Boo Boo still lives in Lowell with a crack habit that costs $200 per day, Dicky is eligible for parole in four years, and Brenda died from an overdose before the film's release.

== In popular culture ==
A fictionalized version of the documentary is featured in the 2010 feature film The Fighter, which was nominated for an Academy Award for Best Picture. In the film, the documentary is titled Crack In America. Eklund, portrayed by Christian Bale, is shown smoking crack and being high throughout, telling his family that the HBO camera crew are filming him making a boxing comeback. Bale won the Best Supporting Actor Oscar for his portrayal of Eklund.

== Post-filming ==
- Brenda delivered her baby and was noted in the film credit updates, to have overdosed on October 25, 1995. Brenda chose to live across the country with her Uncle and Aunt in Oregon for the remainder of her pregnancy. Brenda gave birth to her child on February 19, 1994.
- Gary "Boo Boo" Giuffrida continued to have trouble with the law. In 2012, he was placed under arrest for receiving stolen property and using a stolen credit card. In 2013, while in New Hampshire, he was involved in scuffling with and spitting on a police officer, which resulted in charges alleging attempted transmission of HIV. He received a suspended sentence that forbade him from ever returning to the state of New Hampshire. Boo Boo's employer in the documentary, 'Eat A Donut' in Lowell, Massachusetts, was closed by the department of health in 2007 when they encountered on the premises, among other offenses, hypodermic needles, cocaine and a nude woman. Boo Boo died in Lowell on December 25, 2016, after a brief battle with cancer.
- Dicky Eklund has struggled continually since the documentary's release, noting he has been arrested over 66 times, including for domestic violence, drug crimes and even attempted murder in 2006, in which charges were dropped and his nephew served 11 months in a self-defense fight. His most recent charges are from 2015. He allegedly assaulted his girlfriend of 14 years and during his wait for the trial, he was picked up for driving under the influence. Much like his previous repeated arrests for domestic violence, the charges were dropped as his long-time girlfriend again refused to testify. His DUI charges are currently pending.
- Janice Ellis (aka Janet From Another Planet) was murdered in the early hours of May 8, 2006, by Frank Eberhart. She allegedly attempted to sell him "fake crack" and drew a knife on him, though Eberhart was uninjured. Her body lay in Eberhart's apartment for four days until her murderer attempted to dispose of her body by wrapping it with a carpet and leaving it in an alley. An appeals court upheld his life sentence in 2010.

=== Others related ===
- The actor who played Boo Boo in The Fighter, Paul Campbell, childhood friend and bit part actor for three of Mark Wahlberg's films, was killed by police after fatally stabbing his mother on the steps of their home.
- Co-director Richard Farrell struggled with his newfound fame with this documentary of his hometown. Farrell turned inward and started writing of his own personal struggles in Lowell as an addict in the 1980s. Farrell used inspiration to write a book titled What's Left of Us. There were discussions of development for a film with Berkeley Square Films announcing production starring Channing Tatum in 2010, but it appears talks for the screenplay have stalled. He currently writes for HuffPost relating recent news stories through the eyes of a reformed heroin addict.
- The owner of Eat-A-Donut, Sotiros "Duke" Schrow, who gave Boo Boo a chance at a job and being clean before discovering Boo Boo did not possess a valid driver's license, died in an automobile crash in 2001. Eat-A-Donut was subsequently sold by his widow, then shut down for various health violations such as dirty syringes and human fluids throughout.
