= 17th Screen Actors Guild Awards =

- Awarded for: Outstanding motion picture and primetime television performances
- Date: January 30, 2011
- Location: Shrine Auditorium; Los Angeles, California
- Country: United States
- Presented by: Screen Actors Guild
- Website: www.sagawards.org

Television/radio coverage
- Network: TNT and TBS simultaneous broadcast

The 17th Annual Screen Actors Guild Awards, honoring the best achievements in film and television performances for the year 2010, was presented on January 30, 2011, at the Shrine Exposition Center in Los Angeles, California, for the fifteenth consecutive year. It was broadcast live simultaneously by TNT and TBS.

The nominees were announced on December 16, 2010, by Rosario Dawson and Angie Harmon at Los Angeles' Pacific Design Center's Silver Screen Theater.

== Winners and nominees ==
Winners are listed first and highlighted in boldface.

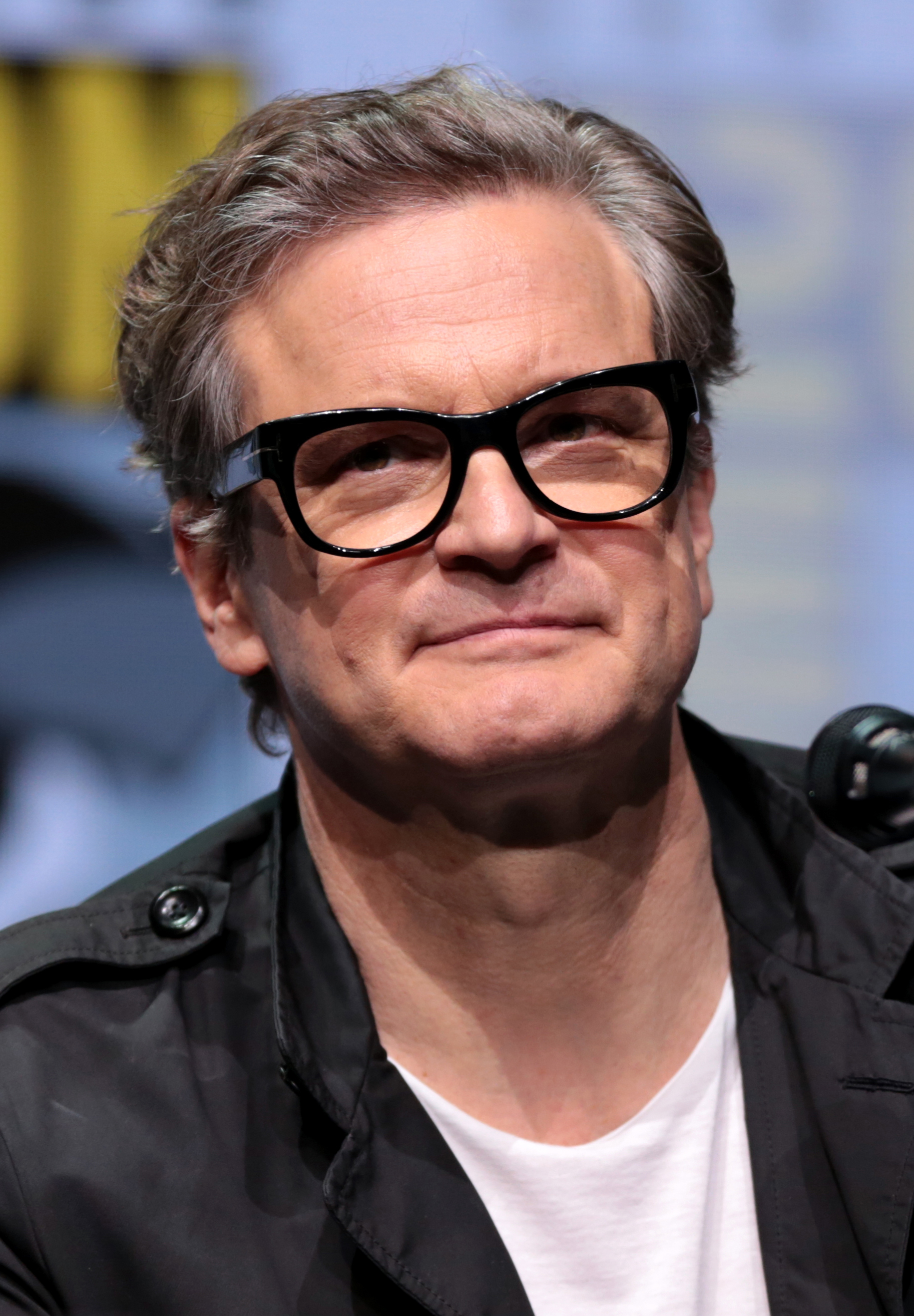
Colin Firth, Outstanding Performance by a Male Actor in a Leading Role winner

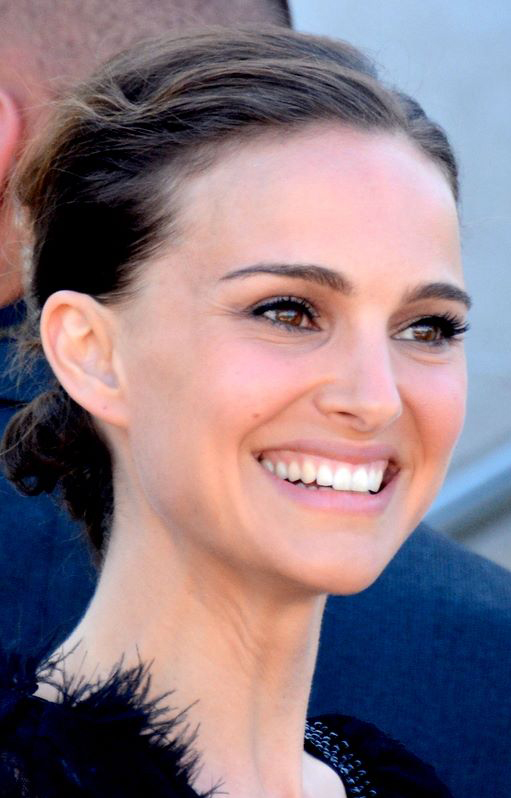
Natalie Portman, Outstanding Performance by a Female Actor in a Leading Role winner

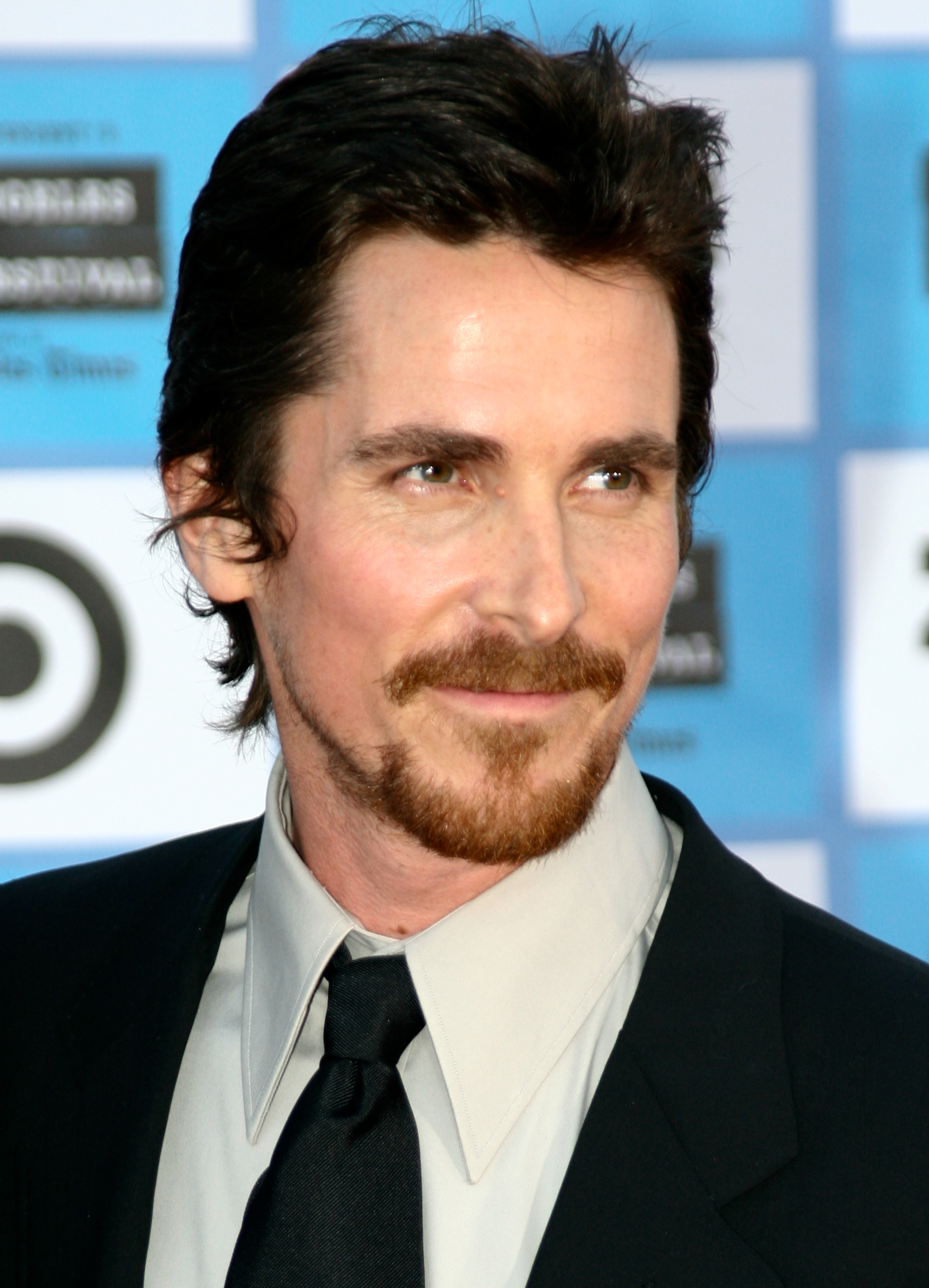
Christian Bale, Outstanding Performance by a Male Actor in a Supporting Role winner

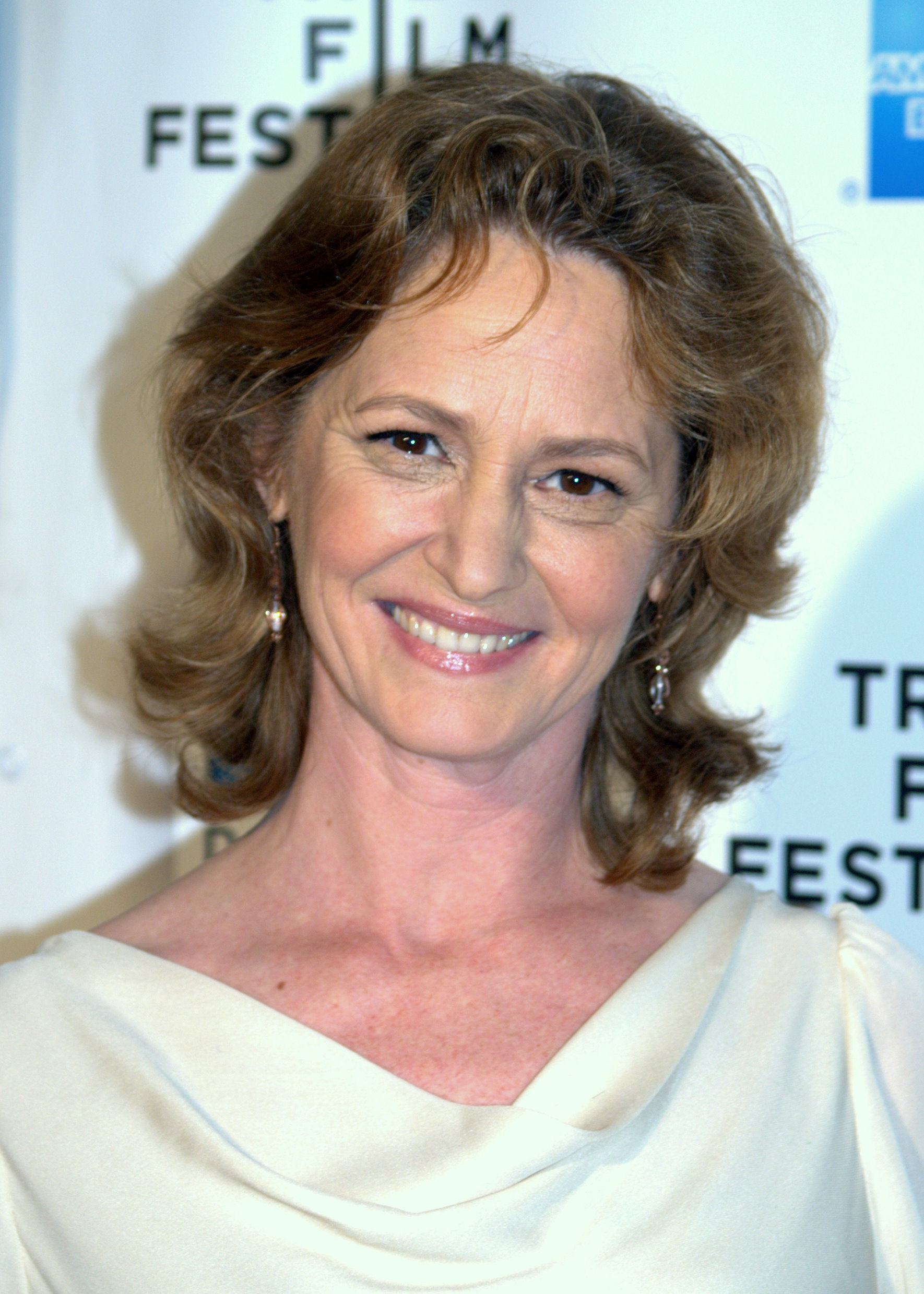
Melissa Leo, Outstanding Performance by a Female Actor in a Supporting Role winner

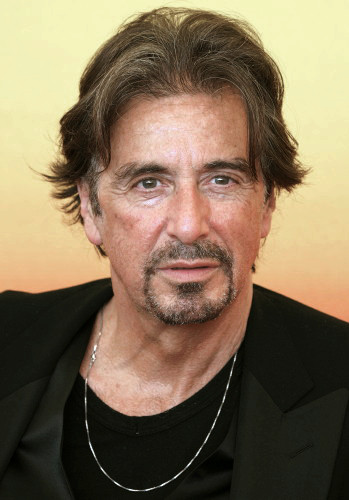
Al Pacino, Outstanding Performance by a Male Actor in a Miniseries or Television Movie winner

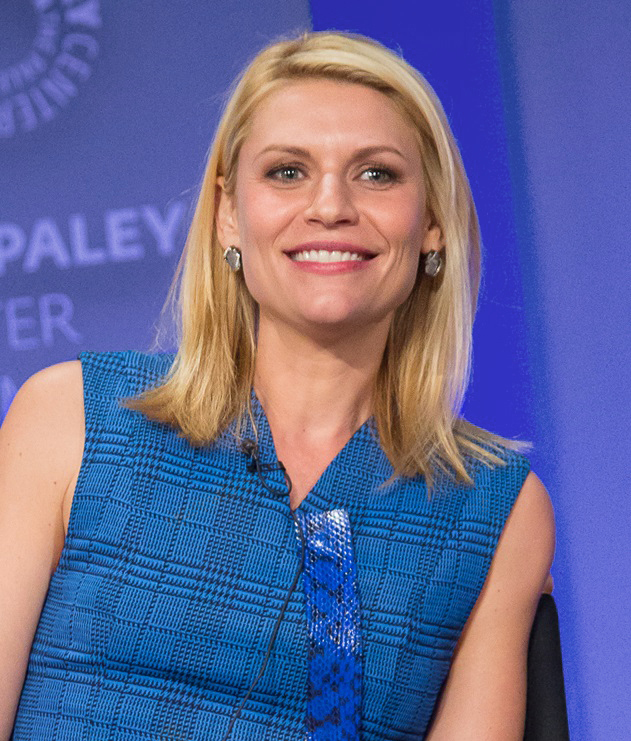
Claire Danes, Outstanding Performance by a Female Actor in a Miniseries or Television Movie winner

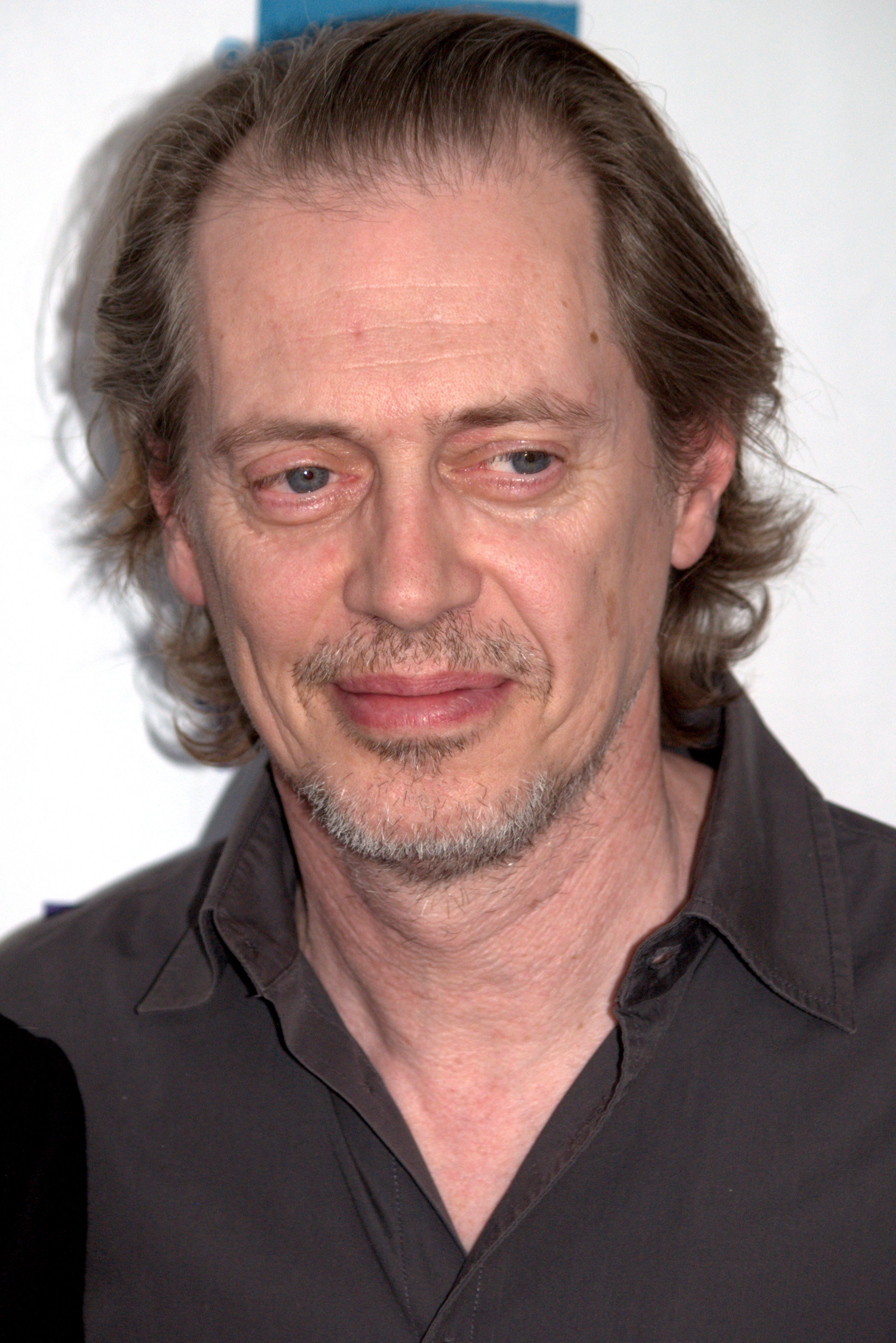
Steve Buscemi, Outstanding Performance by a Male Actor in a Drama Series winner

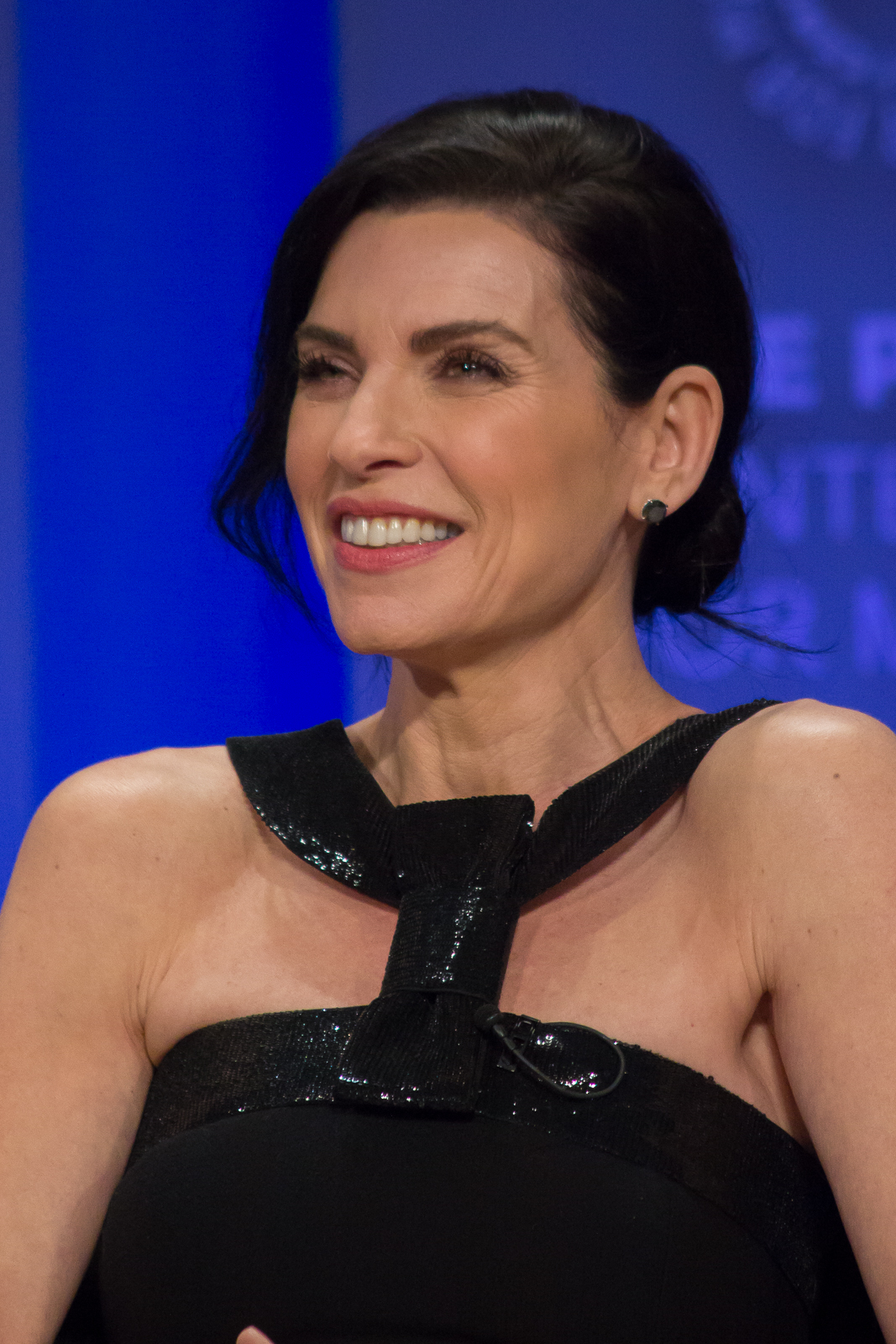
Julianna Margulies, Outstanding Performance by a Female Actor in a Drama Series winner

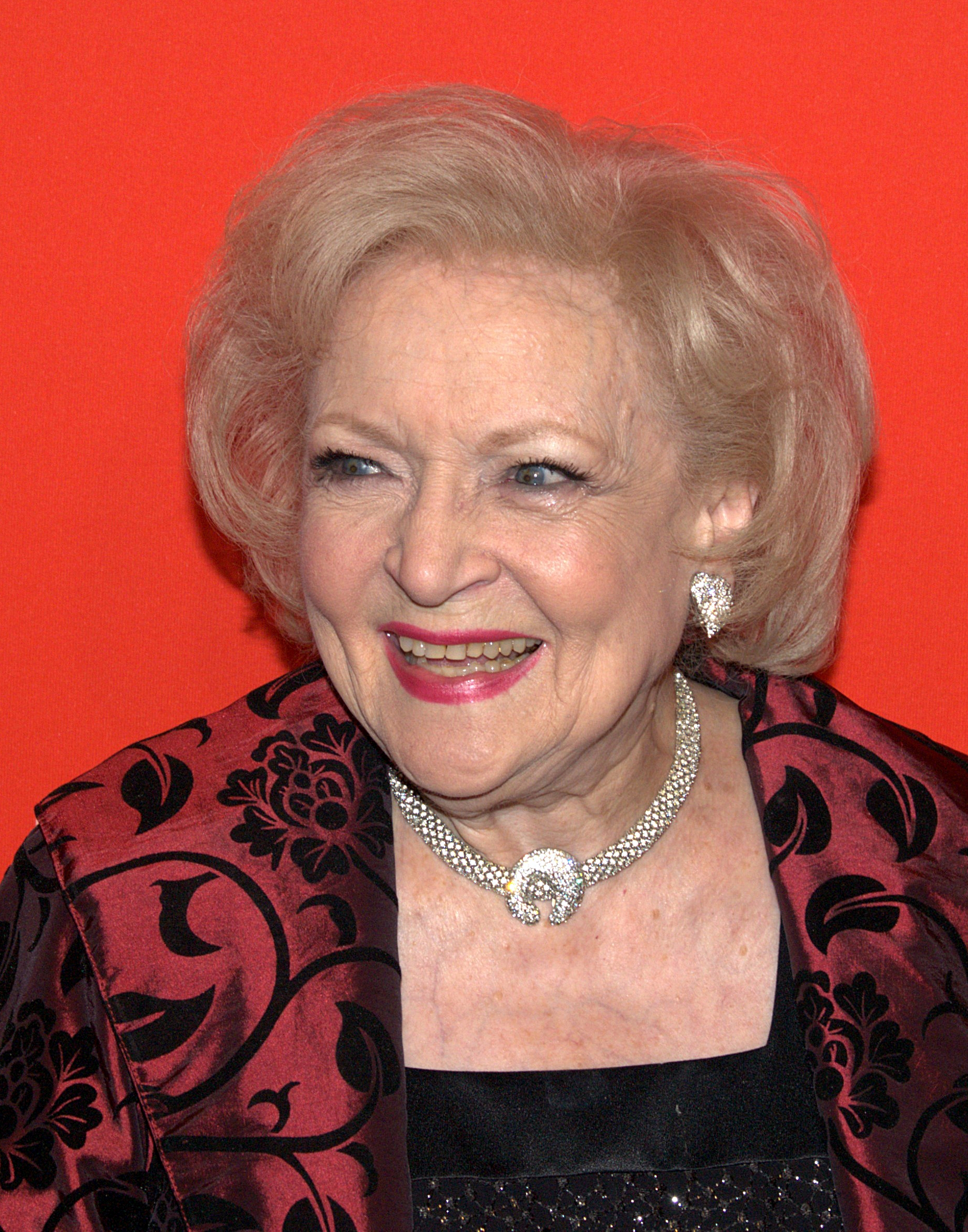
Betty White, Outstanding Performance by a Female Actor in a Comedy Series winner

=== Film ===
Outstanding Performance by a Male Actor in a Leading Role	Outstanding Performance by a Female Actor in a Leading Role
**Colin Firth – The King's Speech as King George VI**; Jeff Bridges – True Grit as Reuben "Rooster" Cogburn; Robert Duvall – Get Low as Felix Bush; Jesse Eisenberg – The Social Network as Mark Zuckerberg; James Franco – 127 Hours as Aron Ralston	**Natalie Portman – Black Swan as Nina Sayers**; Annette Bening – The Kids Are All Right as Dr. Nicole "Nic" Allgood; Nicole Kidman – Rabbit Hole as Becca Corbett; Jennifer Lawrence – Winter's Bone as Ree Dolly; Hilary Swank – Conviction as Betty Anne Walters
Outstanding Performance by a Male Actor in a Supporting Role	Outstanding Performance by a Female Actor in a Supporting Role
**Christian Bale – The Fighter as Dicky Eklund**; John Hawkes – Winter's Bone as Teardrop Dolly; Jeremy Renner – The Town as Jem Coughlin; Mark Ruffalo – The Kids Are All Right as Paul Hatfield; Geoffrey Rush – The King's Speech as Lionel Logue	**Melissa Leo – The Fighter as Alice Ward**; Amy Adams – The Fighter as Charlene Fleming; Helena Bonham Carter – The King's Speech as Queen Elizabeth; Mila Kunis – Black Swan as Lily; Hailee Steinfeld – True Grit as Mattie Ross
Outstanding Performance by a Cast in a Motion Picture
**The King's Speech – Anthony Andrews, Helena Bonham Carter, Jennifer Ehle, Colin Firth, Michael Gambon, Derek Jacobi, Guy Pearce, Geoffrey Rush and Timothy Spall**; Black Swan – Vincent Cassel, Barbara Hershey, Mila Kunis, Natalie Portman and Winona Ryder; The Fighter – Amy Adams, Christian Bale, Melissa Leo, Jack McGee and Mark Wahlberg; The Kids Are All Right – Annette Bening, Josh Hutcherson, Julianne Moore, Mark Ruffalo and Mia Wasikowska; The Social Network – Jesse Eisenberg, Andrew Garfield, Armie Hammer, Josh Pence, Max Minghella and Justin Timberlake
Outstanding Performance by a Stunt Ensemble in a Motion Picture
**Inception**; Green Zone; Robin Hood

=== Television ===
Outstanding Performance by a Male Actor in a Television Movie or Miniseries	Outstanding Performance by a Female Actor in a Television Movie or Miniseries
**Al Pacino – You Don't Know Jack (HBO) as Dr. Jack Kevorkian**; John Goodman – You Don't Know Jack (HBO) as Neal Nicol; Dennis Quaid – The Special Relationship (HBO) as Bill Clinton; Édgar Ramírez – Carlos (Sundance TV) as Carlos the Jackal; Patrick Stewart – Macbeth (PBS) as Macbeth	**Claire Danes – Temple Grandin (HBO) as Temple Grandin**; Catherine O'Hara – Temple Grandin (HBO) as Aunt Ann; Julia Ormond – Temple Grandin (HBO) as Eustacia Grandin; Winona Ryder – When Love Is Not Enough: The Lois Wilson Story (CBS) as Lois Wilson; Susan Sarandon – You Don't Know Jack (HBO) as Janet Good
Outstanding Performance by a Male Actor in a Drama Series	Outstanding Performance by a Female Actor in a Drama Series
**Steve Buscemi – Boardwalk Empire (HBO) as Nucky Thompson**; Bryan Cranston – Breaking Bad (AMC) as Walter White; Michael C. Hall – Dexter (Showtime) as Dexter Morgan; Jon Hamm – Mad Men (AMC) as Don Draper; Hugh Laurie – House (Fox) as Dr. Gregory House	**Julianna Margulies – The Good Wife (CBS) as Alicia Florrick**; Glenn Close – Damages (FX) as Patty Hewes; Mariska Hargitay – Law & Order: Special Victims Unit (NBC) as Det. Olivia Benson; Elisabeth Moss – Mad Men (AMC) as Peggy Olson; Kyra Sedgwick – The Closer (TNT) as Det. Brenda Leigh Johnson
Outstanding Performance by a Male Actor in a Comedy Series	Outstanding Performance by a Female Actor in a Comedy Series
**Alec Baldwin – 30 Rock (NBC) as Jack Donaghy**; Ty Burrell – Modern Family (ABC) as Phil Dunphy; Steve Carell – The Office (NBC) as Michael Scott; Chris Colfer – Glee (Fox) as Kurt Hummel; Ed O'Neill – Modern Family (ABC) as Jay Pritchett	**Betty White – Hot in Cleveland (TV Land) as Elka Ostrovsky**; Edie Falco – Nurse Jackie (Showtime) as Jackie Peyton; Tina Fey – 30 Rock (NBC) as Liz Lemon; Jane Lynch – Glee (Fox) as Sue Sylvester; Sofía Vergara – Modern Family (ABC) as Gloria Delgado-Pritchett
Outstanding Performance by an Ensemble in a Drama Series
**Boardwalk Empire (HBO) – Greg Antonacci, Steve Buscemi, Dabney Coleman, Stephen Graham, Paz de la Huerta, Anthony Laciura, Kelly Macdonald, Gretchen Mol, Aleksa Palladino, Vincent Piazza, Michael Pitt, Michael Shannon, Paul Sparks, Michael Stuhlbarg, Erik Weiner and Shea Whigham**; The Closer (TNT) – G. W. Bailey, Michael Paul Chan, Raymond Cruz, Robert Gossett, Tony Denison, Corey Reynolds, Kyra Sedgwick, J. K. Simmons and Jon Tenney; Dexter (Showtime) – Julie Benz, Jennifer Carpenter, Michael C. Hall, Desmond Harrington, C. S. Lee, Jonny Lee Miller, James Remar, Julia Stiles, Lauren Velez and David Zayas; The Good Wife (CBS) – Christine Baranski, Josh Charles, Alan Cumming, Matt Czuchry, Julianna Margulies, Chris Noth, Archie Panjabi and Graham Phillips; Mad Men (AMC) – Jon Hamm, Jared Harris, Christina Hendricks, January Jones, Vincent Kartheiser, Robert Morse, Elisabeth Moss, Kiernan Shipka, John Slattery, Rich Sommer and Aaron Staton
Outstanding Performance by an Ensemble in a Comedy Series
**Modern Family (ABC) – Julie Bowen, Ty Burrell, Jesse Tyler Ferguson, Nolan Gould, Sarah Hyland, Ed O'Neill, Rico Rodriguez, Eric Stonestreet, Sofía Vergara and Ariel Winter**; 30 Rock (NBC) – Scott Adsit, Alec Baldwin, Katrina Bowden, Kevin Brown, Grizz Chapman, Tina Fey, Judah Friedlander, Jane Krakowski, John Lutz, Jack McBrayer, Tracy Morgan, Maulik Pancholy and Keith Powell; Glee (Fox) – Max Adler, Dianna Agron, Chris Colfer, Jane Lynch, Jayma Mays, Kevin McHale, Lea Michele, Cory Monteith, Heather Morris, Matthew Morrison, Mike O'Malley, Chord Overstreet, Amber Riley, Naya Rivera, Mark Salling, Harry Shum Jr., Iqbal Theba and Jenna Ushkowitz; Hot in Cleveland (TV Land) – Valerie Bertinelli, Jane Leeves, Wendie Malick and Betty White; The Office (NBC) – Leslie David Baker, Brian Baumgartner, Creed Bratton, Steve Carell, Jenna Fischer, Kate Flannery, Ed Helms, Mindy Kaling, Ellie Kemper, Angela Kinsey, John Krasinski, Paul Lieberstein, B. J. Novak, Oscar Nunez, Craig Robinson, Phyllis Smith, Rainn Wilson and Zach Woods
Outstanding Performance by a Stunt Ensemble in a Television Series
**True Blood (HBO)**; Burn Notice (USA Network); CSI: NY (CBS); Dexter (Showtime); Southland (TNT)

=== Screen Actors Guild Life Achievement Award ===
- Ernest Borgnine

== Multiple nominations ==
=== Film ===
Nominations	Film
4	The Fighter
4	The King's Speech
3	Black Swan
3	The Kids Are All Right
2	The Social Network
2	True Grit
2	Winter's Bone

=== Television ===
Nominations	Program
4	Modern Family
3	30 Rock
3	Dexter
3	Glee
3	Mad Men
3	Temple Grandin
3	You Don't Know Jack
2	Boardwalk Empire
2	The Closer
2	The Good Wife
2	Hot in Cleveland
2	The Office

== Multiple wins ==
=== Film ===
Wins	Film
2	The Fighter
2	The King's Speech

=== Television ===
Wins	Program
2	Boardwalk Empire

== In Memoriam ==
Hilary Swank introduced the "In Memoriam" segment which paid tribute to the life and career of actors who died in 2010:

- Jill Clayburgh
- Leslie Nielsen
- Lynn Redgrave
- Robert Culp
- Gloria Stuart
- Kevin McCarthy
- John Forsythe
- Anne Francis
- Pernell Roberts
- Harold Gould
- David Nelson
- Frances Reid
- Larry Keith
- Patricia Neal
- Danny Aiello III
- June Havoc
- James MacArthur
- Barbara Billingsley
- Gary Coleman
- Rue McClanahan
- Zelda Rubinstein
- Fred Foy
- Janet MacLachlan
- Fess Parker
- Lena Horne
- Peter Haskell
- Peter Graves
- Dixie Carter
- Tom Bosley
- Kathryn Grayson
- Pete Postlethwaite
- Steve Landesberg
- Eddie Fisher
- Tony Curtis
- Jean Simmons
- Dennis Hopper
