= Dicky Eklund =

American boxer (born 1957)

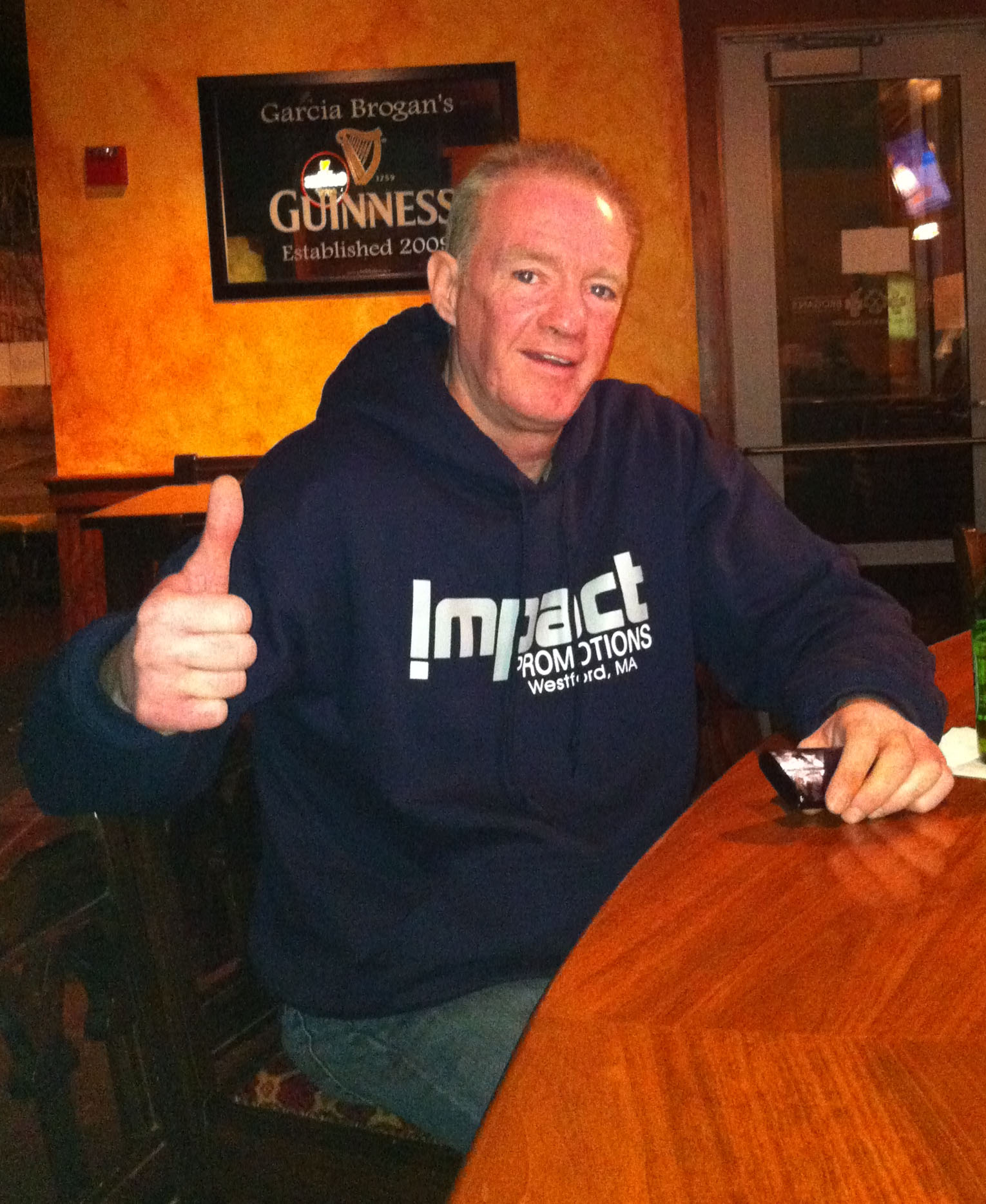
- Eklund in 2010

Personal information
- Nicknames: Dicky; The Pride of Lowell
- Born: Richard Eklund Jr. May 3, 1957 (age 69) Lowell, Massachusetts, U.S.
- Height: 5 ft 10 in (178 cm)
- Weight: Welterweight

Boxing career
- Reach: 70 in (178 cm)
- Stance: Orthodox

Boxing record
- Total fights: 29
- Wins: 19
- Win by KO: 4
- Losses: 10

Richard Eklund Jr. (born May 3, 1957) is an American former professional boxer who competed from 1975 to 1985. Known as "The Pride of Lowell," he held the USA New England welterweight title twice between 1979 and 1983. He is the half-brother and former trainer of former WBU champion Micky Ward. The 2010 biopic The Fighter is based on the two brothers' life.

== Boxing career ==
Eklund grew up in Lowell with seven sisters and his half-brother Micky. He started boxing at the age of 12 in the streets of Lowell. He then began to fight older adults nearly twice his age.

Eklund had an amateur boxing career of 200 bouts, winning 194, including 2 New England Golden Glove championships. Eklund turned professional on August 26, 1975. After losing his debut by 6-round decision to Joe DeFayette, Eklund won 10 straight fights, defeating such opponents as Doug Romano, Terry Rondeau, Carlos Garcia, Randy Milton, and Mike Michaud.

He fought professionally as Dick Eklund; "Dicky" was a nickname used by his family and friends. Before his 1978 match with future world boxing champion Sugar Ray Leonard, Eklund's most impressive victory was over undefeated Rufus Miller (6–0–1) in 1976.

Eklund's most notable fight was on July 18, 1978, against Sugar Ray Leonard at the Hynes Memorial Auditorium in Boston, Massachusetts. He went the distance against Leonard, who eventually won the fight by unanimous decision. During the fight, Eklund was knocked down twice. In the ninth round, the fighters got wrapped up and Leonard fell, which was counted as a slip by the referee Tommy Rawson. However, footage shows a punch being landed on Leonard as he fell. In the film The Fighter, Eklund claims to have knocked down Leonard in their match, though the film acknowledges the slip. In an interview regarding the knockdown, Leonard said, "I slipped."

After his bout with Leonard, he then fought Fernando Fernandez for the vacant USA New England welterweight title. The bout took place in his hometown of Lowell, with Eklund winning the title by defeating Fernandez on PTS. In his next 8 fights, Eklund went on alternating win/loss streaks, losing the first two, winning the next two, losing the next two, and winning the last two. He then fought Robert Sawyer for the ESPN welterweight title but lost via unanimous decision, then splitting his next two fights.

Eklund's fastest victory was a first-round knockout over C.J. Faison in Montreal, Canada on February 10, 1981. Eklund knocked out Canada's Allan Clarke in 9 rounds on August 25, 1981. Clarke's record was listed by the Ring as 21–4–1. On October 25, 1983, Eklund defeated James Lucas to win the USA New England Welterweight Title for a second time. Following a rematch victory over Lucas in 1985, Eklund never fought again.

Eklund's fighting career spanned 10 years from 1975 to 1985, during which he compiled a professional career record of 19 wins, including four by knockout, and ten losses. During his career, Dicky's fame got him in trouble with drugs, specifically crack cocaine, which caused his boxing career to slowly decline and eventually result in his being arrested and sentenced to prison for 10–15 years.

== Life after boxing ==
After Eklund's fighting career ended, he became the trainer of his half-brother, noted former boxer Micky Ward who has credited Eklund as an inspiration for starting his career. Eklund was Ward's full-time trainer for 26 fights, from Ward's professional debut in 1985 until his first retirement in 1991. After Eklund was released from prison in the mid 90s, he helped convince Ward to come out of retirement and began to train him again. Three of Ward's post-retirement fights were voted fight of the year by The Ring, and he captured the WBU title in 2000. Eklund served as Ward's trainer until his second retirement, after his third fight with Arturo Gatti on June 7, 2003. Ward's biography, written by Bob Halloran and titled Irish Thunder: The Hard Life and Times of Micky Ward, discusses much of Eklund's life and career. Eklund alongside Ward would also help train their nephew Sean Eklund, who also went on to become a professional boxer.

On April 1, 2011 Eklund along with Ward were special guest on the Scott Van Pelt Show talking about their careers. That same night they also made a special appearance's on ESPN's Friday Night Fights as special guests giving a live studio analysis as well as a special interview.

Eklund now works as a personal trainer and boxing coach in New England, helping train boxers at Ward's boxing gym in Westford. He would also travel the United States with Micky Ward, giving motivational speeches to college students. The two would even do a three-day tour of the UK in 2012, telling their stories with all the proceeds going to charity.

== Personal life ==
Paramount Pictures' 2010 drama The Fighter chronicles the rise of Eklund's younger half-brother Micky Ward. Directed by David O. Russell, the film stars Christian Bale as Eklund and Mark Wahlberg as Ward. The movie received critical acclaim. At the 2011 Screen Actors Guild Awards, Eklund made a surprise appearance on stage with Christian Bale as the latter accepted the award for Outstanding Supporting Actor for his portrayal of Eklund. Bale also won a Golden Globe and an Academy Award for his performance. During his Academy Award acceptance speech, he thanked Eklund and Ward, who were in the audience. Eklund and Bale have remained in contact.

Eklund was also featured on the HBO documentary High on Crack Street: Lost Lives in Lowell which showed his fall from boxing grace because of his addiction to crack cocaine. In the documentary, Eklund was sentenced to a long prison term for crimes he committed to feed his crack addiction. Eklund has reportedly been arrested 66 times but has since cleaned up as he has gotten older. He still resides in Lowell.

Eklund was named to Irish America's top 100 in 2011 alongside his brother Micky. The two would serve as Grand Marshals at that year's international boxing hall of fame parade.

Eklund's children include two sons — Dicky Jr and Tommy — and daughter Kerry. Dicky Jr. is a former actor-turned-boxing trainer in California.

== Acting career ==
Eklund made his acting debut in the 2014 independent Massachusetts mafia film Portico, where he plays himself.

== Professional boxing record ==
29 fights	19 wins	10 losses
By knockout	4	0
By decision	15	10

No.	Result	Record	Opponent	Type	Round, time	Date	Location	Notes
29	Win	19–10	(United States) James Lucas	UD	10	May 30, 1985	(United States) Cumberland County Civic Center, Portland, Maine, U.S.	
28	Win	18–10	(United States) James Lucas	SD	12	October 25, 1983	(United States) Cumberland County Civic Center, Portland, Maine, U.S.	Won USA New England welterweight title
27	Loss	17–10	(United States) Reggie Miller	UD	10	September 22, 1983	(United States) Lake Charles, Louisiana, U.S.	
26	Win	17–9	(United States) Terry Crawley	SD	10	August 11, 1983	(United States) Yarmouth, Massachusetts	
25	Loss	16–9	(United States) Robert Sawyer	UD	12	September 16, 1982	(United States) Sands Casino Hotel, Atlantic City, New Jersey, U.S.	For ESPN welterweight title
24	Win	16–8	(United States) Jeff Passero	MD	8	July 31, 1982	(United States) Ballys Place Hotel Casino, Atlantic City, New Jersey, U.S	
23	Win	15–8	(Puerto Rico) Cesar Guzman	PTS	8	July 14, 1982	(United States) Boston, Massachusetts, U.S.	
22	Loss	14–8	(United States) Kevin Howard	SD	10	January 7, 1982	(United States) Sands Casino Hotel, Atlantic City, New Jersey, U.S.	
21	Loss	14–7	(Canada) Chris Clarke	SD	10	October 27, 1981	Halifax Metro Center, Halifax, Canada	
20	Win	14–6	(Canada) Allen Clarke	KO	9 (10)	August 25, 1981	Halifax Metro Center, Halifax, Canada	
19	Win	13–6	(United States) C.J. Faison	KO	1 (8), 2:58	February 10, 1981	Paul Sauvé Arena, Montreal, Canada	
18	Loss	12–6	(United States) Fernando Fernandez	SD	10	June 20, 1980	(United States) Boston, Massachusetts, U.S.	
17	Loss	12–5	(United Kingdom) Dave Boy Green	PTS	10	December 4, 1979	(United Kingdom) Empire Pool, London, England	
16	Win	12–4	(United States) Fernando Fernandez	PTS	10	August 18, 1979	(United States) Lowell, Massachusetts, U.S.	Won USA New England welterweight title
15	Loss	11–4	(United States) Sugar Ray Leonard	UD	10	July 18, 1978	(United States) Hynes Auditorium, Boston, Massachusetts, U.S.	
14	Loss	11–3	(United States) Willie Rodriguez	SD	8	March 4, 1978	(United States) Boston, Massachusetts, U.S.	
13	Win	11–2	(United States) Al Cruz	KO	5 (6), 1:50	January 16, 1978	(United States) Waltham, Massachusetts, U.S.	
12	Loss	10–2	(Finland) Erkki Meronen	PTS	6	February 24, 1977	Østerbro Stadium, Copenhagen, Denmark	
11	Win	10–1	(United States) Rufus Miller	UD	8	October 30, 1976	(United States) East Hartford High School, East Hartford, U.S.	
10	Win	9–1	(United States) Mike Michaud	SD	8	September 20, 1976	(United States) Golden Banana Club, Peabody, Massachusetts, U.S.	
9	Win	8–1	(United States) Randy Milton	UD	6	June 24, 1976	(United States) Oakdale Theatre, Wallingford, Connecticut, U.S.	
8	Win	7–1	(United States) Jose Carlos Garcia	UD	6	April 26, 1976	(United States) Boston Garden, Boston, Massachusetts, U.S.	
7	Win	6–1	(United States) Charlie Benjamin	PTS	6	February 21, 1976	(United States) Waterbury, Connecticut, U.S.	
6	Win	5–1	(United States) Terry Rondeau	PTS	6	January 31, 1976	(United States) State Armory, Waterbury, Connecticut, U.S.	
5	Win	4–1	(Puerto Rico) Jose Papo Melendez	UD	4	December 20, 1975	(United States) Hynes Auditorium, Boston, Massachusetts, U.S.	
4	Win	3–1	(United States) Avelino Dos Reis	KO	3 (6)	November 21, 1975	(United States) Providence, Rhode Island, U.S.	
3	Win	2–1	(United States) Eddie Hudson	UD	4	November 6, 1975	(United States) Portland, Maine, U.S.	
2	Win	1–1	(United States) Doug Romano	UD	4	September 30, 1975	(United States) Boston Garden, Boston, Massachusetts, U.S.	
1	Loss	0–1	(United States) Joe DeFayette	SD	6	August 26, 1975	(United States) Sargent Field, New Bedford, Massachusetts, U.S.	

== See also ==
- Notable boxing families
