= List of accolades received by 127 Hours =

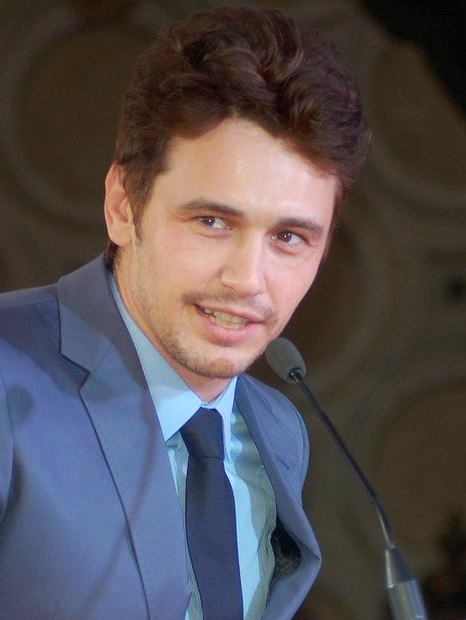
- James Franco's performance has gained the most attention from award groups.
Accolades
Award	Won	Nominated
Academy Awards	0	6
Alliance of Women Film Journalists	0	6
American Film Institute	1	1
Art Directors Guild	0	1
British Academy Film Awards	0	8
Chicago Film Critics Association	0	1
Critics' Choice Movie Awards	1	8
Dallas–Fort Worth Film Critics Association	3	4
Detroit Film Critics Society	1	3
Empire Awards	0	3
Evening Standard British Film Awards	0	1
Golden Globe Awards	0	3
Houston Film Critics Society	0	6
Independent Spirit Awards	1	3
London Film Critics' Circle	0	2
London Film Festival Awards	0	1
Motion Picture Sound Editors	0	1
MTV Movie & TV Awards	0	1
New York Film Critics Online	2	2
Online Film Critics Society	0	5
Producers Guild of America Awards	0	1
San Diego Film Critics Society	0	5
Santa Barbara International Film Festival	1	1
Satellite Awards	0	9
Screen Actors Guild Awards	0	1
St. Louis Film Critics Association	1	5
Toronto Film Critics Association	0	1
Vancouver Film Critics Circle	0	1
Washington D.C. Area Film Critics Association	0	6
World Soundtrack Academy	1	2
Writers Guild of America Awards	0	1
- Total number of awards and nominations
Totals	13	106
- References

127 Hours is a 2010 British independent biographical adventure film directed by Danny Boyle. It stars James Franco in the principal role as real-life mountain climber Aron Ralston, whose hand was trapped under a boulder in a Utah ravine for more than five days in April 2003. Adapted from Ralston's autobiography Between a Rock and a Hard Place, 127 Hours's screenplay was written by Boyle and Simon Beaufoy. Distributors Fox Searchlight and Pathé gave the feature limited releases in the United States and United Kingdom on 5 November 2010 and 7 January 2011, respectively. It grossed £35.8 million at the box office by the end of its worldwide theatrical run. Rotten Tomatoes, a review aggregator surveyed 215 reviews and judged 93% to be positive. Additionally, 127 Hours appeared on more than two dozen movie reviewers' Top Ten lists for the best movies of 2010.

The film has received honors for its direction, music, cinematography and writing, as well as for the lead performance by Franco. At the 68th Golden Globe Awards ceremony, 127 Hours earned three nominations: for Best Actor – Motion Picture Drama, Best Original Score and Best Screenplay. The picture was nominated in nine Satellite Award categories, including direction, score, sound, original song and visual effects. It also received nine nominations from the Broadcast Film Critics Association. The 64th British Academy Film Awards nominated it for eight of their awards, including Best Director, Best Editing, Best Music and Best Sound. Additionally, 127 Hours was nominated for the BAFTA Award for Best Film, but lost to The King's Speech. It performed similarly at the 83rd Academy Awards, where it was nominated in six categories: Best Actor, Best Adapted Screenplay, Best Film Editing, Best Original Score, Best Original Song (for "If I Rise") and Best Picture, but lost respectively in all categories to The King's Speech, The Social Network, and Toy Story 3.

Franco was named Best Actor by the New York Film Critics Online and 2010 Independent Spirit Awards. He also received recognition from the Screen Actors Guild, at their 17th annual ceremony. Franco's arm amputation scene towards the end of 127 Hours was nominated at the viewer-voted 2011 MTV Movie Awards. Boyle's and Beaufoy's efforts on the movie's script earned them nominations from the Writers Guild of America and Evening Standard British Film Awards. Along with producer Christian Colson, Boyle garnered another nomination, this time from the Producers Guild of America. The Detroit Film Critics Society honored Boyle as Best Director. Suttirat Larlarb's input on the movie's production design earned her one nomination from the Art Directors Guild. The film's cinematography garnered nominations at the 2010 Houston Film Critics Awards and the 2010 San Diego Film Critics Society Awards. The American Film Institute listed 127 Hours as one of the ten best movies of 2010.

== Accolades ==
Award	Date of ceremony	Category	Recipient(s) and nominee(s)	Result
Academy Award	27 February 2011	Best Picture	Christian Colson, Danny Boyle and John Smithson	Nominated
Academy Award	27 February 2011	Best Actor	James Franco	Nominated
Academy Award	27 February 2011	Best Adapted Screenplay	Danny Boyle and Simon Beaufoy	Nominated
Academy Award	27 February 2011	Best Film Editing	Jon Harris	Nominated
Academy Award	27 February 2011	Best Original Score	A. R. Rahman	Nominated
Academy Award	27 February 2011	Best Original Song	A. R. Rahman, Dido and Rollo Armstrong for "If I Rise"	Nominated
Alliance of Women Film Journalists	10 January 2011	Best Actor	James Franco	Nominated
Alliance of Women Film Journalists	10 January 2011	Best Adapted Screenplay	Danny Boyle and Simon Beaufoy	Nominated
Alliance of Women Film Journalists	10 January 2011	Best Editing	Jon Harris	Nominated
Alliance of Women Film Journalists	10 January 2011	Best Score	A. R. Rahman	Nominated
Alliance of Women Film Journalists	10 January 2011	Bravest Performance	James Franco	Nominated
Alliance of Women Film Journalists	10 January 2011	Unforgettable Moment	127 Hours	Nominated
American Film Institute	12 December 2010	AFI Movies of the Year	127 Hours	Won
Art Directors Guild	5 February 2011	Excellence in Production Design for a Contemporary Film	Suttirat Larlarb	Nominated
British Academy Film Awards	13 February 2011	Best Actor in a Leading Role	James Franco	Nominated
British Academy Film Awards	13 February 2011	Best Adapted Screenplay	Danny Boyle and Simon Beaufoy	Nominated
British Academy Film Awards	13 February 2011	Best Cinematography	Anthony Dod Mantle and Enrique Chediak	Nominated
British Academy Film Awards	13 February 2011	Best Director	Danny Boyle	Nominated
British Academy Film Awards	13 February 2011	Best Editing	Jon Harris	Nominated
British Academy Film Awards	13 February 2011	Best Music	A. R. Rahman	Nominated
British Academy Film Awards	13 February 2011	Best Sound	Glenn Freemantle, Steven C. Laneri, Douglas Cameron, Ian Tapp and Richard Pryke	Nominated
British Academy Film Awards	13 February 2011	Outstanding British Film	127 Hours	Nominated
Broadcast Film Critics Association	14 January 2011	Best Actor	James Franco	Nominated
Broadcast Film Critics Association	14 January 2011	Best Adapted Screenplay	Danny Boyle and Simon Beaufoy	Nominated
Broadcast Film Critics Association	14 January 2011	Best Cinematography	Anthony Dod Mantle and Enrique Chediak	Nominated
Broadcast Film Critics Association	14 January 2011	Best Director	Danny Boyle	Nominated
Broadcast Film Critics Association	14 January 2011	Best Editing	Jon Harris	Nominated
Broadcast Film Critics Association	14 January 2011	Best Picture	127 Hours	Nominated
Broadcast Film Critics Association	14 January 2011	Best Song	A. R. Rahman, Dido and Rollo Armstrong for "If I Rise"	Won
Broadcast Film Critics Association	14 January 2011	Best Sound	Glenn Freemantle, Steven C. Laneri, Douglas Cameron, Ian Tapp and Richard Pryke	Nominated
Chicago Film Critics Association	20 December 2010	Best Actor	James Franco	Nominated
Dallas–Fort Worth Film Critics Association	17 December 2010	Best Actor	James Franco	Won
Dallas–Fort Worth Film Critics Association	17 December 2010	Best Cinematography	Anthony Dod Mantle and Enrique Chediak	Won
Dallas–Fort Worth Film Critics Association	17 December 2010	Best Director	Danny Boyle	Nominated
Dallas–Fort Worth Film Critics Association	17 December 2010	Top 10 Films	127 Hours	Won
Detroit Film Critics Society	16 December 2010	Best Actor	James Franco	Nominated
Detroit Film Critics Society	16 December 2010	Best Director	Danny Boyle	Won
Detroit Film Critics Society	16 December 2010	Best Film	127 Hours	Nominated
Empire Awards	27 March 2011	Best Actor	James Franco	Nominated
Empire Awards	27 March 2011	Best British Film	127 Hours	Nominated
Empire Awards	27 March 2011	Best Thriller	127 Hours	Nominated
Evening Standard British Film Awards	7 February 2011	Best Screenplay	Danny Boyle and Simon Beaufoy	Nominated
Golden Globe Awards	16 January 2011	Best Actor – Motion Picture Drama	James Franco	Nominated
Golden Globe Awards	16 January 2011	Best Original Score	A. R. Rahman	Nominated
Golden Globe Awards	16 January 2011	Best Screenplay	Danny Boyle and Simon Beaufoy	Nominated
Houston Film Critics Society	18 December 2010	Best Actor	James Franco	Nominated
Houston Film Critics Society	18 December 2010	Best Cinematography	Anthony Dod Mantle and Enrique Chediak	Nominated
Houston Film Critics Society	18 December 2010	Best Director	Danny Boyle	Nominated
Houston Film Critics Society	18 December 2010	Best Original Score	A. R. Rahman	Nominated
Houston Film Critics Society	18 December 2010	Best Original Song	A. R. Rahman and Dido and Rollo ("If I Rise")	Nominated
Houston Film Critics Society	18 December 2010	Best Picture	127 Hours	Nominated
Independent Spirit Awards	26 February 2011	Best Film	127 Hours	Nominated
Independent Spirit Awards	26 February 2011	Best Director	Danny Boyle	Nominated
Independent Spirit Awards	26 February 2011	Best Male Lead	James Franco	Won
London Film Critics' Circle	10 February 2011	British Director of the Year	Danny Boyle	Nominated
London Film Critics' Circle	10 February 2011	British Film of the Year	127 Hours	Nominated
London Film Festival	27 October 2010	Best Film	127 Hours	Nominated
Motion Picture Sound Editors	20 February 2011	Best Sound Editing: Feature Film FX & Foley	Glenn Freemantle	Nominated
MTV Movie Awards	5 June 2011	Jaw Dropping Moment	James Franco	Nominated
National Movie Awards	11 May 2011	Best Drama	127 Hours	Nominated
National Movie Awards	11 May 2011	Performance of the Year	James Franco	Nominated
New York Film Critics Online	12 December 2010	Best Actor	James Franco	Won
New York Film Critics Online	12 December 2010	Top Ten Films	127 Hours	Won
Online Film Critics Society	3 January 2011	Best Actor	James Franco	Nominated
Online Film Critics Society	3 January 2011	Best Adapted Screenplay	Danny Boyle and Simon Beaufoy	Nominated
Online Film Critics Society	3 January 2011	Best Cinematography	Anthony Dod Mantle and Enrique Chediak	Nominated
Online Film Critics Society	3 January 2011	Best Director	Danny Boyle	Nominated
Online Film Critics Society	3 January 2011	Best Editing	Jon Harris	Nominated
Producers Guild of America	22 January 2011	Best Theatrical Motion Picture	Danny Boyle and Christian Colson	Nominated
San Diego Film Critics Society	14 December 2010	Best Actor	James Franco	Nominated
San Diego Film Critics Society	14 December 2010	Best Cinematography	Anthony Dod Mantle and Enrique Chediak	Nominated
San Diego Film Critics Society	14 December 2010	Best Director	Danny Boyle	Nominated
San Diego Film Critics Society	14 December 2010	Best Editing	John Harris	Nominated
San Diego Film Critics Society	14 December 2010	Best Original Score	A. R. Rahman	Nominated
Santa Barbara International Film Festival	29 January 2011	Outstanding Performance of the Year	James Franco	Won
Satellite Awards	19 December 2010	Best Actor — Motion Picture Drama	James Franco	Nominated
Satellite Awards	19 December 2010	Best Adapted Screenplay	Danny Boyle and Simon Beaufoy	Nominated
Satellite Awards	19 December 2010	Best Cinematography	Anthony Dod Mantle and Enrique Chediak	Nominated
Satellite Awards	19 December 2010	Best Director	Danny Boyle	Nominated
Satellite Awards	19 December 2010	Best Film — Drama	127 Hours	Nominated
Satellite Awards	19 December 2010	Best Original Score	A. R. Rahman	Nominated
Satellite Awards	19 December 2010	Best Original Song	A. R. Rahman, Dido and Rollo Armstrong ("If I Rise")	Nominated
Satellite Awards	19 December 2010	Best Sound	Glenn Freemantle, Steven C. Laneri, Douglas Cameron, Ian Tapp and Richard Pryke	Nominated
Satellite Awards	19 December 2010	Best Visual Effects	James Winnifrith, Adam Gascoyne and Tim Caplan	Nominated
Screen Actors Guild Awards	30 January 2011	Outstanding Performance by a Male Actor in a Leading Role	James Franco	Nominated
St. Louis Film Critics Association	20 December 2010	Best Actor	James Franco	Nominated
St. Louis Film Critics Association	20 December 2010	Best Director	Danny Boyle	Nominated
St. Louis Film Critics Association	20 December 2010	Best Adapted Screenplay	Danny Boyle and Simon Beaufoy	Nominated
St. Louis Film Critics Association	20 December 2010	Moving the Medium Forward	127 Hours	Nominated
St. Louis Film Critics Association	20 December 2010	Special Merit	127 Hours	Won
Toronto Film Critics Association	14 December 2010	Best Actor	James Franco	Nominated
Vancouver Film Critics Circle	10 January 2011	Best Actor	James Franco	Nominated
Washington D.C. Area Film Critics Association	6 December 2010	Best Actor	James Franco	Nominated
Washington D.C. Area Film Critics Association	6 December 2010	Best Adapted Screenplay	Danny Boyle and Simon Beaufoy	Nominated
Washington D.C. Area Film Critics Association	6 December 2010	Best Cinematography	Anthony Dod Mantle and Enrique Chediak	Nominated
Washington D.C. Area Film Critics Association	6 December 2010	Best Director	Danny Boyle	Nominated
Washington D.C. Area Film Critics Association	6 December 2010	Best Film	127 Hours	Nominated
Washington D.C. Area Film Critics Association	6 December 2010	Best Score	A. R. Rahman	Nominated
World Soundtrack Academy	22 October 2011	The Public Choice Award	A. R. Rahman	Won
World Soundtrack Academy	22 October 2011	Best Original Song Written Directly for a Film	A. R. Rahman, Dido and Rollo Armstrong ("If I Rise")	Nominated
Writers Guild of America	5 February 2011	Best Adapted Screenplay	Danny Boyle and Simon Beaufoy	Nominated

== See also ==
- 2010 in film
