= 127 Hours (soundtrack) =

127 Hours: Music from the Motion Picture

Soundtrack album by A. R. Rahman
- Released: 2 November 2010
- Recorded: K. M. Musiq Studios, Los Angeles; AIR Studios, London; Miloko Studios, London; Hear No Evil Recording Studio, London; Panchathan Record Inn and AM Studios, Chennai; Nirvana Studios, Mumbai
- Genres: Post-industrial, experimental, ambient
- Length: 1:01:23
- Labels: Interscope, Fox Music
- Producers: A. R. Rahman, Gretchen Anderson

A. R. Rahman chronology
Jhootha Hi Sahi (2010)	127 Hours (2010)	Rockstar (2011)

Singles from 127 Hours: Music from the Motion Picture
- 1. "If I Rise" Released: 2 November 2010

127 Hours: Music from the Motion Picture is the soundtrack to Danny Boyle's 2010 film of the same name. It was composed by Academy Award Winner A. R. Rahman, Boyle's previous collaborator on Slumdog Millionaire. The score, centred on guitar, was recorded mainly in London and was completed in three weeks. The soundtrack was released digitally on 2 November and physically on 22 November, by Interscope Records and Fox Music. The score is briefly orchestral and the song's main theme, "If I Rise" features Rahman playing the Harpejji.

The soundtrack album includes original score and the theme song composed by Rahman, the tracks "Never Hear Surf Music Again" by Free Blood, "Lovely Day" by Bill Withers, Frédéric Chopin's Nocturne No.2 in E flat, Op.9 No.2, "Ça plane pour moi" by Plastic Bertrand, "If You Love Me" by Esther Phillips, and "Festival" by Sigur Rós. The original theme song of the film, "If I Rise", is written by A. R. Rahman (music), Dido and Rollo Armstrong (lyrics) and performed by Dido along with Rahman. It was featured in the climax scene of the film.

The film's subject Aron Ralston's favourite band, Phish, is mentioned in the film. During production, Boyle asked Ralston how Phish lyrics could be included in the film. Ralston sings lines from the Phish song "Sleeping Monkey" when swimming in one of the early scenes of the movie. But the soundtrack album did not feature this song. Another song "The Funeral" from Band of Horses is not in the soundtrack album, but is used in the end of the trailer.

== Development ==
Rahman collaborated with Danny Boyle for the second time. Their previous association, Slumdog Millionaire was a great critical and commercial success to Rahman, who was described by Time magazine as India's most prominent movie songwriter, in 2005. After the scripting finished, Boyle handed over the script to Rahman, who says when he first got the script and the screenplay, even before the shoot, some kind of sounds came into his mind and he put some stuff down and sent it to Boyle when he was cutting the movie. Rahman wanted the score to feel very much like something the cinematic Ralston might be listening to, a mix of heavily layered acoustic and electric guitars, brightened with digital effects. Rahman says that he was able to complete the score within a short period of three to four weeks.

== Reception ==
Professional ratings
Review scores
Source	Rating
AllMusic	3.5/5 stars
ChartAttack	4/5 stars
Empire	5/5 stars
Film Music Magazine	A
Filmtracks	3/5 stars
Gordon and the Whale	3/5 stars
Los Angeles Times	3.5/5 stars
Music Aloud	8.75/10
Movie Music UK	3.5/5 stars
Movie Wave	3.5/5 stars
ScoreNotes	7/10 stars

The soundtrack received generally favourable critical reviews. Philip French of The Observer commented that "The music is subtly varied; the soundtrack makes admirable use of silence and natural sound."

Sarah Kurchak of ChartAttack reviewed the music saying "There's something about the way Danny Boyle uses popular music in his films that's really exciting for anyone who genuinely cares about the medium. Plenty of directors are good with a score, and he's no slouch in that department, but the use of songs is a different beast. In both score and songs, Boyle seems to have an inherent ability to understand the moods and emotions music can inspire in people and uses it to augment his storytelling."

The soundtrack was rated five out of five in the review by Danny Graydon of Empire magazine. His review reads: "Following their Oscar-winning collaboration on Slumdog Millionaire, A. R. Rahman provides Danny Boyle’s tale of a mountaineer in dire straits with an affecting core of slow-burn, reflective cues that ultimately penetrate in a big way, supported by a typically eclectic array of exterior tracks from the likes of Free Blood, Bill Withers and, most effectively, Sigur Rós. Rahman’s nine cues are anchored on acoustic guitar and generate a suitably meditative tone, augmented by ethnic pipes (Acid Darbari) and ethereal vocals (R. I. P.). Rahman’s collaboration with singer Dido, If I Rise, closes proceedings with a cathartic and quietly optimistic tone which almost prompts a tear."

Margaret Wappler, in the review published in Los Angeles Times, said that "In his last movie, Slumdog Millionaire, director Danny Boyle showed a sophisticated sense of how music and image can intertwine and intensify each other. With his latest, 127 Hours, he proves his skill again, reenlisting composer A.R. Rahman, who won two Academy Awards for his racing, kinetic score to Boyle's violent fairy tale set in Mumbai, India."

Daniel Schweiger of Film Music Magazine said that "Danny Boyle and A.R. Rahman are going for a far more interior moment of transcendence, one that tells us the often-awful fight for life is more than worth it- especially in this haunting fever dream that take a filmmaker and musician to new heights while pondering their way out of a man's darkest hours."

The review published by Christian Clemmensen at Filmtracks commented that "Whether or not you can stomach this film or its equally challenging album, the music serves as even more evidence that the diversity of Rahman's talents can compete favourably in an otherwise arguably stale film scoring environment in the United States."

Jonathan Broxton of Movie Music UK gave a favourable review and called the score an "unconventional one". He also praised Rahman for his ability to score in multiple genres.

Director Shekhar Kapur, after a special screening of the movie, commented through Twitter that "Rahman's score adds depth to Danny Boyle's deft and energetic direction in 127 hours. Rahman certainly deserves another Oscar for 127 hours, Danny Boyle and Rahman are proving to be a great combination."

Aron Ralston, on whom the movie is based, praised Rahman for the music and posted a hand-written note on Facebook and Twitter.

== Awards and nominations ==
- Nominated – Academy Award for Best Original Score
- Nominated – Academy Award for Best Original Song for "If I Rise"
- Nominated – Alliance of Women Film Journalists Award for Best Score
- Nominated – BAFTA Award for Best Film Music
- Won – Broadcast Film Critics Association Award for Best Song for "If I Rise"
- Nominated – Central Ohio Film Critics Association Award for Best Score
- Won – Denver Film Critics Society for Best Song for "If I Rise"
- Nominated – Golden Globe Award for Best Original Score
- Nominated – Houston Film Critics Society Award for Best Original Score
- Nominated – Houston Film Critics Society Award for Best Original Song for "If I Rise"
- Nominated – Las Vegas Film Critics Society Award for Best Song for "If I Rise"
- Nominated – San Diego Film Critics Society Award for Best Original Score
- Nominated – Satellite Award for Best Original Score
- Nominated – Satellite Award for Best Original Song for "If I Rise"
- Nominated – Washington D.C. Area Film Critics Association Award for Best Score
- Won – World Soundtrack Award – Public Choice (A. R. Rahman)
- Nominated – World Soundtrack Award for Best Original Song Written Directly for a Film for "If I Rise"

== Track listing ==
No.	Title	Writer(s)	Artist(s)	Length
1.	"Never Hear Surf Music Again"	John Pugh	Free Blood	5:52
2.	"The Canyon"	A. R. Rahman	A. R. Rahman	3:01
3.	"Liberation Begins"	A. R. Rahman	A. R. Rahman	2:14
4.	"Touch of the Sun"	A. R. Rahman	A. R. Rahman	4:39
5.	"Lovely Day"	Bill Withers, Skip Scarborough	Bill Withers	4:16
6.	"Nocturne No.2 in E flat, Op.9 No.2"	Frédéric Chopin	Vladimir Ashkenazy	4:01
7.	"Ça plane pour moi"	Francis Jean Deprijck, Yves Maurice Lacomblez	Plastic Bertrand	3:00
8.	"Liberation in a Dream"	A. R. Rahman	A. R. Rahman	4:06
9.	"If You Love Me (Really Love Me)"	Marguerite Monnot, Édith Piaf (Original French lyrics), Geoffrey Parsons (English adaptation)	Esther Phillips	3:27
10.	"Acid Darbari"	A. R. Rahman	A. R. Rahman	4:21
11.	"R.I.P."	A. R. Rahman	A. R. Rahman	5:11
12.	"Liberation"	A. R. Rahman	A. R. Rahman	3:11
13.	"Festival"	Jon Thor Birgisson, Orri Páll Dýrason, Georg Hólm, Kjartan Sveinsson	Sigur Rós	9:26
14.	"If I Rise"	A. R. Rahman, Dido & Rollo Armstrong	Dido, A. R. Rahman, Chorus (Note: Chorus by The Gleehive Children's Choir, Mumbai (Jervis Dias, Kristen Fernandes, Alisha Pais, Jessica Dmello, Sherize Alveyn, Evania Cerejo, Jememia Fernandes, and Aidan D'silva) and recorded at Octavious Studio, Mumbai.)	4:38
Total length:				1:01:23

== Personnel ==
- A. R. Rahman – harpejji
- Ranjit Barot – drums
- Sanjay Divecha – guitar
- Joel Shearer – guitar
- Karl Peters – bass guitar
- Pete Lockett – percussion
