= 1st Annual Awards.com Movie Awards =

The 1st Annual Awards.com Movie Awards were held on January 23, 2011. The nominations were announced on January 8, 2011. The results were used by counting how many praises the nominee got on the nominated movie's Metacritic page. The ceremony took place on its home website, the independent database Awards.com.

== Winners and nominees ==
=== Best Picture ===
- 127 Hours
- Black Swan
- The Fighter
- Inception
- The Kids Are All Right
- The King's Speech
- The Social Network
- Toy Story 3
- True Grit
- Winter's Bone

=== Best Director ===
- Darren Aronofsky, Black Swan
- Joel and Ethan Coen, True Grit
- David Fincher, The Social Network
- Tom Hooper, The King's Speech
- Christopher Nolan, Inception

=== Best Actor ===
- Jesse Eisenberg, The Social Network
- Colin Firth, The King's Speech
- James Franco, 127 Hours
- Ryan Gosling, Blue Valentine
- Mark Wahlberg, The Fighter

=== Best Actress ===
- Annette Bening, The Kids Are All Right
- Nicole Kidman, Rabbit Hole
- Jennifer Lawrence, Winter's Bone
- Natalie Portman, Black Swan
- Michelle Williams, Blue Valentine

=== Best S. Actor ===
- Christian Bale, The Fighter
- Michael Douglas, Wall Street: Money Never Sleeps
- Aaron Eckhart, Rabbit Hole
- Mark Ruffalo, The Kids Are All Right
- Geoffrey Rush, The King's Speech

=== Best S. Actress ===
- Amy Adams, The Fighter
- Melissa Leo, The Fighter
- Julianne Moore, The Kids Are All Right
- Vanessa Redgrave, Letters to Juliet
- Hailee Steinfeld, True Grit

=== Best Animated Feature ===
- Despicable Me
- How to Train Your Dragon
- The Illusionist
- Tangled
- Toy Story 3

=== Best Adapted Script ===
- 127 Hours
- Nowhere Boy
- Rabbit Hole
- The Social Network
- True Grit

=== Best Original Script ===
- Easy A
- The Fighter
- The Kids Are All Right
- The King's Speech
- Toy Story 3

=== Best Art Direction ===
- The American
- Black Swan
- The Fighter
- Knight & Day
- True Grit

=== Best Cinematography ===
- Buried
- The Fighter
- The Social Network
- True Grit
- Wall Street 2

=== Best Editing ===
- 127 Hours
- The Fighter
- Green Zone
- Inception
- The Social Network

=== Best Costumes ===
- Black Swan
- The Fighter
- The King's Speech
- Shutter Island'
- The Social Network

=== Best Makeup ===
- Alice in Wonderland
- Black Swan
- True Grit

=== Best Original Score ===
- 127 Hours
- Hereafter
- Inception
- The King's Speech
- The Runaways
- True Grit

=== Best Original Song ===
- Burlesque - "Bound to You"
- Country Strong - "Country Strong"
- Tangled - "I See the Light"
- Toy Story 3 - "We Belong Together"
- Waiting for "Superman" - "Shine"

=== Best Sound Editing ===
- Inception
- Iron Man 2
- The Social Network
- Toy Story 3
- True Grit

=== Best Sound Mixing ===
- Black Swan
- Harry Brown
- Inception
- Shutter Island
- True Grit

=== Best Visual Effects ===
- Alice in Wonderland
- Inception
- Splice

=== Best Documentary ===
- Client 9: The Rise and Fall of Eliot Spitzer
- Joan Rivers: A Piece of Work
- Living in Emergency: Stories of Doctors Without Borders
- The Oath
- Waiting for "Superman"

=== Newcomer of the Year Award ===
- Chloë Grace Moretz

== Multiple nominations and winners ==
=== Multiple nominations ===
- Ten: The Fighter and True Grit
- Eight: The Social Network
- Seven: Black Swan, Inception, and The King's Speech
- Five: 127 Hours, The Kids Are All Right, and Toy Story 3
- Three: Rabbit Hole
- Two: Alice in Wonderland, Blue Valentine, Shutter Island, Tangled, Waiting for "Superman", Wall Street: Money Never Sleeps, and Winter's Bone

=== Multiple winners ===
- Three: Inception
- Two: Black Swan, The Fighter, The Kids Are All Right, The King's Speech, The Social Network, True Grit

== Trivia ==
- This is the only award Nicole Kidman won for her performance as Becca Corbett in Rabbit Hole. She was still nominated for the Academy Award for Best Actress.
- Toy Story 3 was nominated for Best Original Script, though it's considered to be more of an adapted screenplay.
