= Jhootha Hi Sahi (soundtrack) =

Soundtrack album by A. R. Rahman
- Released: 17 September 2010
- Recorded: Panchathan Record Inn and AM Studios
- Genre: Feature Film Soundtrack
- Length: 40:34
- Label: Saregama
- Producer: A. R. Rahman

A. R. Rahman chronology
Enthiran (2010)	Jhootha Hi Sahi (2010)	127 Hours (2010)

Jhootha Hi Sahi is the soundtrack to the 2010 Bollywood romantic comedy film of the same name, directed by Abbas Tyrewala starring John Abraham and Pakhi Tyrewala. The soundtrack, consisting of seven original tracks and two remix versions was composed by A. R. Rahman with lyrics penned by Abbas Tyrewala. The audio was officially released on 17 September by the Saregama label at the Sa Re Ga Ma Pa competition. The album was very well received by the critics and was the chart topper for some weeks.

"Call Me Dil", a track from the album became the first track that has been repeated 360 times on any radio channel in a single day across 15 cities in India. The track which was aired in Radio City is on its way to get an entry into the Limca Book of Records. The album also holds another record for being the first album to be released on the LP record format after more than a decade.

== Development ==
Following the success of Rahman's previous collaboration with Abbas Tyrewala, Jaane Tu... Ya Jaane Na, he composed the musical score and soundtrack of Jhootha Hi Sahi, too. The soundtrack consists of seven original tracks and two remix versions. The collectors edition special pack also had karaokes of all the nine tracks. Rahman had composed eight tracks for the film, however a track by Shaan and Sunidhi Chauhan will not feature in the film or soundtrack album. There are also reports that Rahman has made an impromptu decision to record two more songs for the film, one a title track and the other for the opening and closing credits of the movie. There were rumours that KK and Adnan Sami have recorded songs for the album, however this did not happen. A few of the songs were recorded in London, while the rest were recorded in Chennai.

The original film score was also composed and conducted by Rahman. There were reports that the re-recording of the score took much time than planned and this led to the delayed release of the movie. Rahman recorded some of the background score at an iconic studio in Los Angeles. Rahman wrote on a social networking website, "Recorded with a Los Angeles jazz quartet, a couple of whom have played with the likes of Barbra Streisand and Billie Holiday."

The track "I've Been Waiting" gave the break for South Indian singer Vijay Yesudas in Hindi. Based on jazz music, this song was well received upon release and established a bright career for Vijay in Bollywood. Another version of this song was released on 20 October. The female solo song was completely in English. "Here is the moonlight, with love from all of us to you! No synthesizers, no vocoders, no rhythm machines. Just plain love and acoustic instruments recorded at Capitol Records, L. A. Strings was done in good old Chennai. Composing a song like this was a long time dream. It is the sound of another era where love had innocence. Hope it inspires you to fall in love again. Special thanks to Abbas Tyrewala who agreed to release this track specially for you all and I hope you enjoy watching Jhootha Hi Sahi, the movie, releasing on 22 October," A. R. Rahman told his fans after unveiling the song.

== Release ==
Two tracks "Cry Cry" and "Maiyya Yashoda" were officially out through Nokia OVI Music Store. The promos of these tracks were released on 5 September and 15 September respectively. Another song, "Call Me Dil" was performed by Rahman in Sa Re Ga Ma Pa on 17 September. John Abraham and A.R.Rahman unveiled the audio album in that programme. Madhu Pantena, the producer of the film and Pakhi Tyrewala were the others present at the function. The album was made available in various music portals on 17 September itself, however the CDs hit the stores only on 23 September 2010. This newer marketing method was a "360 degree" approach by Sa Re Ga Ma for marketing the film as well as its music. The premium music pack containing the karaokes were released on 26 September in a function at Oberoi Mall, Gurgaon. The female version of the track "I've Been Waiting" was released by Rahman on 20 October. An instrumental theme of the song "Maiyya Yashoda" was also subsequently released.

The LP record was released, since "Jhootha Hi Sahi music has a timeless, classic feel to it" according to Apurv Nagpal, managing director of Saregama. It was in 1997 that the last LP record was sold in India, which was by Saragama itself for Dil To Pagal Hai.

== Reception ==
Professional ratings
Review scores
Source	Rating
Musicaloud	9/10 stars
Bollywood Hungama	3/5 stars
Rediff	3/5 stars
Times of India	(Not rated)
Milliblog	(Not rated)

The soundtrack received a generally positive response. A review by Music Aloud said, "Simplicity and subtlety win you over all through this refreshing album from A R Rahman, arguably his best in 2010 going by the sheer number of songs."

Apurv Nagpal, CEO of Saregama said, "I think this will be Rahman’s best composition till now. Each song has a distinct feel. In fact, it seems like Rahman has created an entirely new genre of music with Jhoota Hi Sahi."

=== Chart performance ===
The soundtrack also topped the Indian charts even before the audio release. The track "Cry Cry" ranked No. 7 in the weekly charts, published on 17 September, the very first day it was released. "Cry Cry" was No. 5 and "Maiyya Yashoda" No. 17 on the next week and notably these achievements were before the official audio release. After the official audio release, the songs started growing on the charts, with the song "Maiyya Yashoda" having a peak position at #3 Many of the other tracks have also topped the charts the following weeks. However, the initial euphoria was fast evaporating as the movie did not do that well in the box office.

== Track listing ==
The complete track listing of the soundtrack was released on 13 September on A. R. Rahman's official site.

No.	Title	Singers	Length
1	"Cry Cry"	Rashid Ali, Shreya Ghoshal	4:26
2	"Maiyya Yashoda (Jamuna Mix)"	Javed Ali, Chinmayi	5:09
5	"Hello Hello"	Karthik (Additional vocals by Hentry Kuruvilla)	3:32
4	"Do Nishaniyan"	Sonu Nigam (Additional vocals by Rishikesh Kamerkar, Thomson Andrews, Neuman Pinto, Bianca Gomes, Dominique Cerejo, Samantha Edwards (singer), Vivienne Pocha, Clinton Cerejo)	4:56
3	"Pam Pa Ra"	Shreya Ghoshal (Additional vocals by Suzanne D'Mello)	4:10
6	"I've Been Waiting"	Vijay Yesudas	4:56
7	"Mayya Yashoda (Thames Mix)"	Javed Ali, Chinmayi	5:24
9	"Do Nishaniyan (Heartbreak Reprise)"	Sonu Nigam	2:45
8	"Call Me Dil"	Rashid Ali	5:13

Collectors Edition Special Pack
No.	Title	Length
10.	"Cry Cry (Karaoke)"	4:26
11.	"Mayya Yashoda (Karaoke)"	5:09
12.	"Hello Hello (Karaoke)"	3:32
13.	"Do Nishaniyan (Karaoke)"	4:56
14.	"Pam Pa Ra (Karaoke)"	4:10
15.	"I've Been Waiting (Karaoke)"	4:56
16.	"Mayya Yashoda – Thames Mix (Karaoke)"	5:24
17.	"Do Nishaniyan – Heartbreak Reprise (Karaoke)"	2:45
18.	"Call Me Dil (Karaoke)"	5:13

Unreleased tracks
No.	Title	Length
19.	"I've Been Waiting (Female)"	4:07
20.	"Mayya Yashoda (Theme)"	1:17

== Album credits ==
=== Contributing artistes ===
- Sivamani – drums, percussion
- Keith Peters – bass guitar
- Rashid Ali, Sanjeev Thomas – guitar
- Sekar – cello
- Naveen Kumar, Navin Iyer – flute
- Thomas – trumpet
- Martin – saxophone
- Asad Khan – sitar
- Dines Rahate – shakers

=== Production ===
- Producers: A. R. Rahman
- Engineers: Suresh Permal, P. A. Deepak, Srinidhi Venkatesh, S. Sivakumar, Kannan Ganpat, Pradeep
- String engineer: V. J. Srinivasamurthy
- Mixing: K. J. Singh
- Mastering: S. Sivakumar, K. J. Singh
- Programming: T. R. Krishna Chetan, Deepak P. A., Hentry Kuruvilla
- Music coordination: Noell James, Faizuddin T.M.
