= Man Laws =

Series of beer commercials

Man Laws (Men of the Square Table) are a series of beer commercials for Miller Lite, inspired by the supposed unwritten codes by which men live. The "Men of the Square Table" are a parody of King Arthur's Knights of the Round Table. The "Square Table" they congregate around is located in what appears to be a secret, Dr. Strangelove-esque room with glass (probably soundproof) walls. The advertising campaign was a response to negative feedback about prior sexist advertising. The campaign also included a website as well as print advertising.

The ads featured the "Men of the Square Table", which consisted of men of great significance in different fields, such as football star Jerome Bettis, pro wrestler Triple H, actor/comedian Eddie Griffin, adventurer Aron Ralston, professional bull-rider Ty Murray, and actor Burt Reynolds, who acts as the Square Table's de facto leader. The ads would consist of the men bringing up a certain topic or situation, sometimes simple beer-related topics, such as whether anything other than beer can be stored in the garage fridge, or if one can take leftover beers that he brought to a party back home; other topics would be slightly more serious, such as how long one can wait before asking out his best friend's ex-girlfriend, or if it's time to retire the "high-five" celebration. After a short discussion on the topic, the men will come to a consensus on a new Man Law, at which point the men raise their beer bottles (or sometimes cans) and proclaim, "Man Law!", at which point the Square Table's elderly scribe would write the new Man Law down.

== Change with 2007 NFL season ==
The Miller Brewing Co. unveiled a new football-related advertising campaign to effectively replace the Man Law ads starting the week of September 2, 2007, to coincide with the start of the 2007 NFL Regular Season. The series is called More Taste League (MTL) and these ads consist of actor John C. McGinley portraying The Commish of beer to protect Miller Lite's status as the beer of choice. Miller had signed a new agency to handle their TV and radio ads, with the first ones to be unveiled during that time.
