= StarrBoard =

Stringed musical instrument

The StarrBoard is a stringed musical instrument invented by John D. Starrett and patented on July 23, 1985.

It is a tapping instrument similar in concept to the Chapman Stick except that it is played on a stand (like a keyboard) rather than worn on the body. Another difference is that it is played with fingers parallel to the strings rather than perpendicular. The strings are spaced so that an octave span (13 strings) is the same distance as on a standard piano, 6.5". The frets of the StarrBoard are spaced at semitone intervals, as are those on most fretted instruments. The piano-like note markers on the fretboard reflect a semitone string tuning system, although Starrett experimented with various microtonal tuning systems over the years. At least eleven StarrBoards were built before Starrett ceased production of the instrument. Most of the instruments were electric, although at least one was purely acoustic and two had wired frets and strings for electronic processing to provide MIDI output. The StarrBoard is no longer being manufactured, although a derivative instrument called the harpejji is being made.

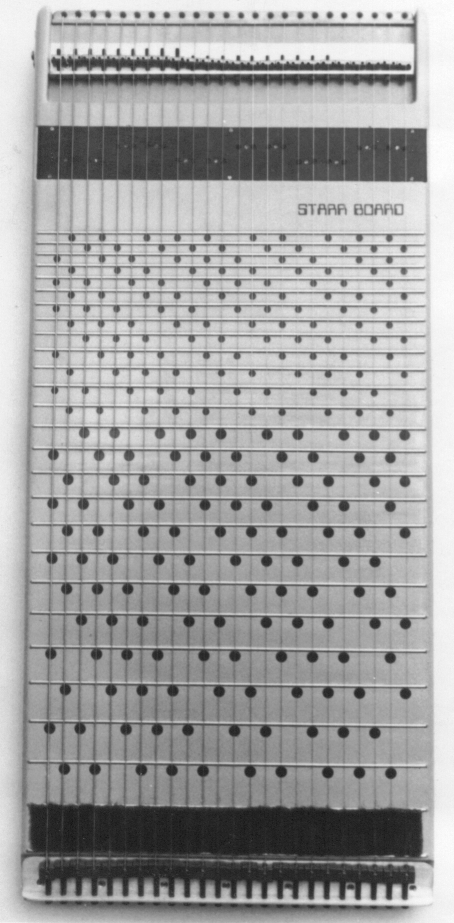
A 24 string electric StarrBoard

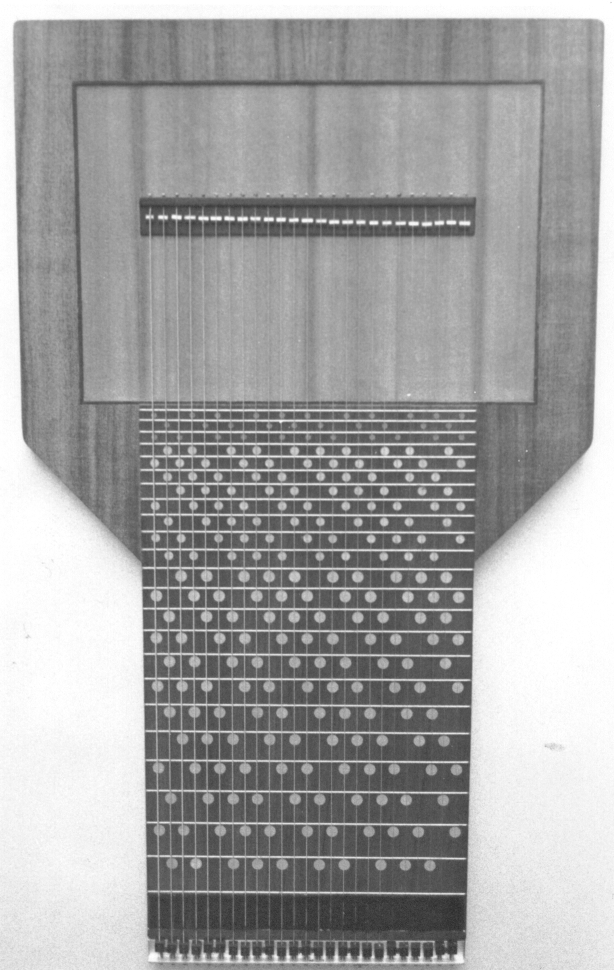
A 25 string acoustic StarrBoard
