= We Belong Together (Randy Newman song) =

Single by Randy Newman

from the album Toy Story 3
- Released: June 15, 2010
- Recorded: 2009
- Genre: Blue-eyed soul; pop; soundtrack
- Length: 4:03
- Label: Walt Disney
- Songwriter: Randy Newman

Randy Newman singles chronology
"A Few Words in Defense of Our Country" (2007)	"We Belong Together" (2010)

"We Belong Together" is a song written, composed and performed by Randy Newman for the 2010 film Toy Story 3. The song was nominated for several Best Original Song awards from various film societies and awards committees. The song won the Academy Award for Best Original Song at the 83rd Academy Awards in February 2011.

== Description ==
It is the first song on the film score of Toy Story 3. The entire album was composed and conducted by Randy Newman. Upon the film's release, Disney did not release the soundtrack album for Toy Story 3 on CD. It was only available as a music download in lossy formats such as MP3 and AAC, until January 2012, when Walt Disney Records and Intrada Records released the soundtrack on CD.

== Cover versions ==
Brian Wilson covered the song on his 2011 album, In the Key of Disney.

== Awards ==
Award	Category/Recipient(s)	Result	Reference	Lost to
16th Annual BFCA Critics Choice Awards	Best Original Song	Nominated		"If I Rise"
2010 Denver Film Critics Society	Best Original Song	Nominated		"If I Rise"
Phoenix Film Critics Society Awards 2010	Best Original Song	Nominated		"You Haven't Seen the Last of Me"
1st Annual Awards.com Movie Awards	Best Original Song	Nominated		"I See the Light"
83rd Academy Awards	Best Original Song	Won		Won

When Newman accepted his Oscar, which was presented by Jennifer Hudson, his speech was a humorous one that Moviefone.com says "stole the show". He made fun of advice he was given that "it's not really good television to take a list out of your pocket and thank a lot of people", saying that "I just have to thank these people. I don't want to. I want to be good television so badly."

It was nominated for the Broadcast Film Critics Association Award for Best Song at the 16th Annual BFCA Critics Choice Awards in 2011 and Best Original Song at the 2010 Denver Film Critics Society, losing both to "If I Rise" by A. R. Rahman and Dido. It lost Best Original Song awards to Cher's "You Haven't Seen the Last of Me" at the Phoenix Film Critics Society Awards 2010 and "I See the Light", from the film Tangled, at the 1st Annual Awards.com Movie Awards.
