= Bluejohn Canyon =

Slot canyon in Utah, United States

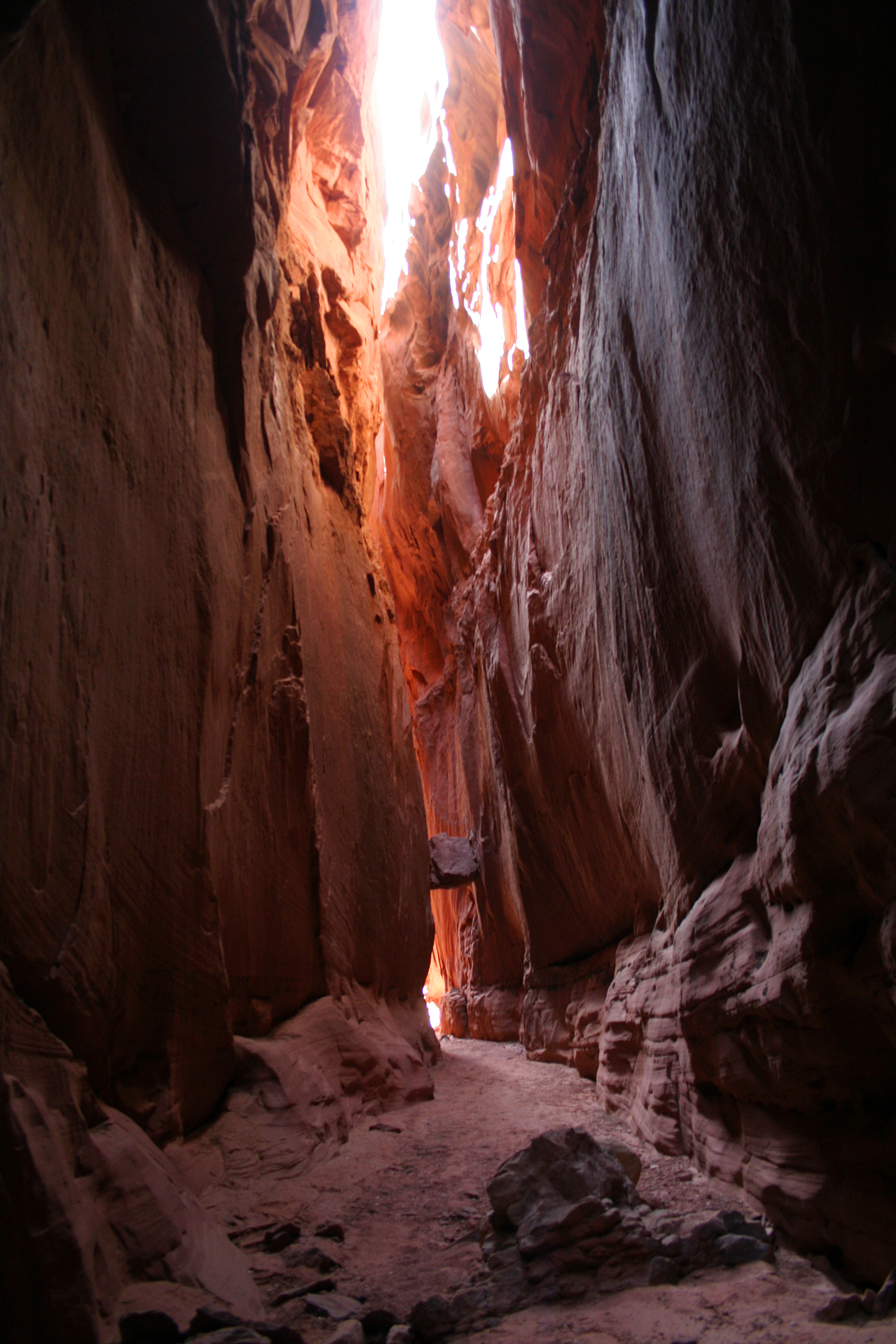
- Main Fork Bluejohn Canyon, October 2011

- Location within Utah
- Floor elevation: 4,839 ft (1,475 m)

Geography
- Location: Canyonlands National Park; Wayne County, Utah; United States
- Coordinates: 38°22′42″N 110°16′41″W
- Interactive map of Bluejohn Canyon

Bluejohn Canyon (often referred to as "Blue John Canyon") is a slot canyon in eastern Wayne County, Utah, United States. It is on BLM land just south of the boundary of the Horseshoe Canyon Unit of Canyonlands National Park.

== Description ==
Bluejohn Canyon is probably named for a 19th-century outlaw by the name of John Griffith, who reportedly kept stolen horses in the area. He had one blue eye and one brown eye and was known by the nickname "Blue John".

Though often mistakenly believed to be within Canyonlands National Park, Bluejohn Canyon is actually on BLM land southwest of the Horseshoe Canyon Unit of the park and 42 miles (68 km) south of the town of Green River. The main fork of the canyon, approximately 11 miles (18 km) in length, runs north-northeast from the Robbers Roost Flats, and is a tributary of Horseshoe Canyon. The main fork also has several tributary canyons of its own. Traversing the entire length of Bluejohn Canyon requires technical canyoneering skills and equipment.

Bluejohn Canyon came to international attention in 2003 as the place where outdoorsman Aron Ralston was forced to amputate his own right forearm with a multi-tool after it became trapped by a boulder. Ralston's five-day ordeal was described in his autobiography Between a Rock and a Hard Place and was depicted in the 2010 film 127 Hours.

== See also ==
- List of canyons and gorges in Utah
