= Harpejji =

Electric stringed musical instrument

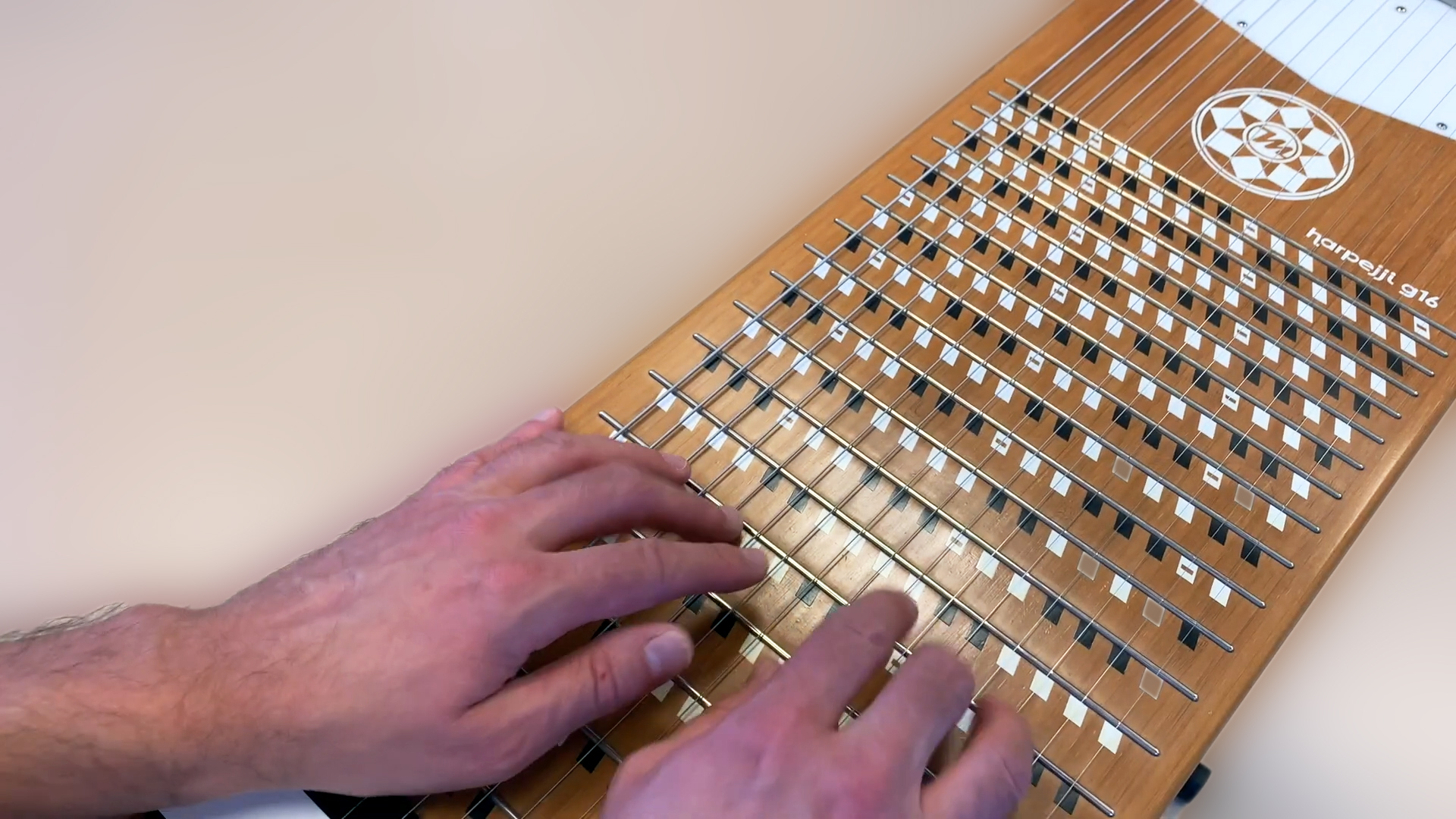
Playing a harpejji

The harpejji (/hɑːrˈpɛdʒiː/ har-PEJ-ee) is an electric 12-to-24-stringed musical instrument developed in 2007 by American audio engineer Tim Meeks. It has been described by its manufacturer as a cross between a piano and a guitar, and by Jacob Collier as a cross between an accordion and a pedal steel guitar. The playing surface has a layout arranged in ascending whole tones across strings, and ascending semi-tones as the strings travel away from the player, with the 24-string models featuring a five-octave range from A_{0} to A_{5}, and the 22-stringed M5 also offering a 5 octave range from C1 to C6. Harpejjis use an electronic muting system to dampen unfretted strings and minimize the impact of sympathetic vibrations.

About 500 harpejjis had been made as of 2019.

The harpejji is a descendant of the StarrBoard which was developed in the 1980s. Its name is a portmanteau from "harp" and "arpeggio".

== Technique ==
The harpejji is primarily played with a two-handed tapping technique. It differs from other tapping instruments, such as the Chapman Stick, by way of the orientation of the instrument to the player. The instrument rests on a stand like a keyboard, with the strings perpendicular to the player. The instrument allows for the musician to use all 10 fingers to fret the strings, and a single hand can cover a two-octave range. New techniques for playing the instrument are beginning to surface, such as strumming with a pick. Unlike the piano, no formal pedagogy has been established for the harpejji.

== Models ==
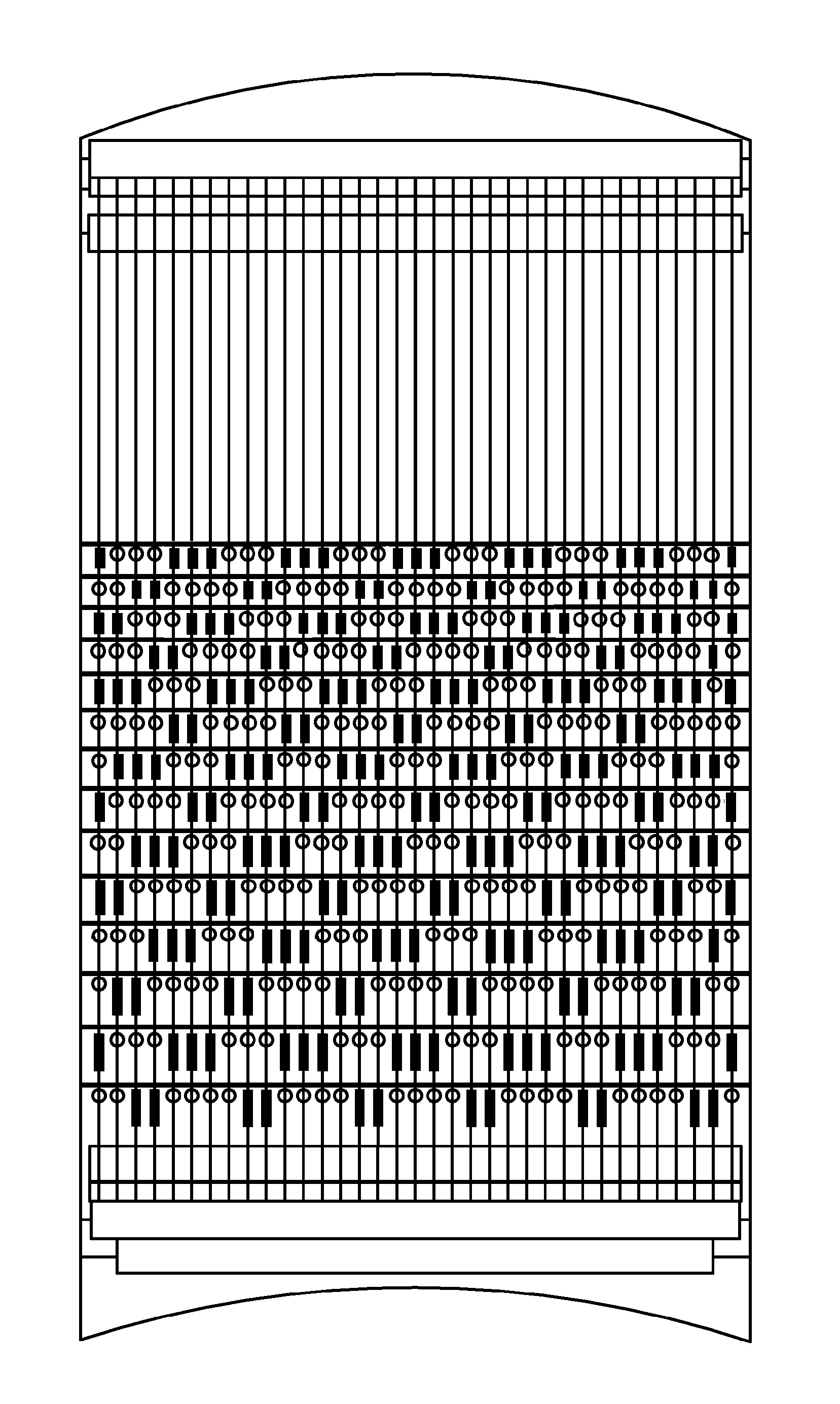
Diagram of the D1 model.

The harpejji is manufactured by hand by the inventor's company, Marcodi Musical Products, with the Standard Harpejji U12 priced at $3,199, the Standard Harpejji G16 priced at $4,799, and the Standard Harpejji K24 priced at $6,399. The building process takes 30–60 days.

The first harpejji model, the 24-string D1, was produced from January 2008 through May 2010. It was subsequently replaced by the K24, which also has 24 strings. The latter model includes updates to the internal electronics, a simplification of the fretboard marker system, and a change from maple to bamboo as the primary wood for the instrument. In January 2011, the G16, a smaller 16-string model with a four-octave range (from C_{2} to C_{6}) and mono output, was introduced. Newer models include the Msf (12-string), M5 (22 string), and U12 (12 string).

== Players and recordings ==
The first commercial harpejji recording was made by Jordan Rudess for the soundtrack to the God of War III video game. Rudess has also used the harpejji in the band Dream Theater.

The first all-original harpejji album was released on March 23, 2021, by Lance Hoeppner. The album, titled I AM Lance Vol.1, Harpejji Meets The Tempest, consists of six songs written by Hoeppner and performed on the harpejji and DSI Tempest.

Stevie Wonder played his hit song "Superstition" on a 16-string harpejji at the 2012 Billboard Music Awards. Wonder has also used the harpejji in live performances such as at the A Concert For Charlottesville in 2017. Wonder guested with the Dave Matthews Band and performed three songs with the instrument.

Two-time Grammy and Oscar winner A. R. Rahman has used the harpejji in several of his recordings and live shows. His Oscar-nominated song "If I Rise" from the movie 127 Hours features the instrument. In the opening episode of Season 3 of Coke Studio India, he played the harpejji in two songs: "Ennile Maha Oliyo" and "Jagao Mere Des."

The band Walk Off The Earth and guest Scott Helman can be seen playing the harpejji in their music video cover for "Can't Feel My Face". The video shows the four playing the instrument simultaneously.

Harry Connick Jr played a harpejji during a performance on episode 15 of season 19 of American Idol on April 19, 2021.

Jack Stratton of Vulfpeck recorded a song titled "Harpejji I" on the album Vulfnik, released June 1, 2023.

Jacob Collier and Cory Henry are also known to be proficient harpejji players.
