= Miller Lite =

American light pilsner beer

- Miller Lite logo
- Type: Pilsner-style light American lager
- Manufacturer: Miller Brewing Company
- Origin: Chicago, Illinois, U.S.
- Introduced: 1975; 51 years ago
- Alcohol by volume: 4.2%
- Website: millerlite.com

Miller Lite
Nutritional value per 100 g (3.5 oz)
- Energy: 113 kJ (27 kcal)
- Carbohydrates: .9
- Fat: 0.0
- Protein: <1
- ^{†}Percentages estimated using US recommendations for adults.

Miller Lite is a light American lager produced by Molson Coors with 4.2% alcohol by volume (ABV) and reduced calories. It was introduced in 1973 in limited markets by the Miller Brewing Company (then owned by Philip Morris, Inc.) followed by national distribution in 1975.

Its market success prompted other brewers to introduce their own reduced calorie "light" beers. As a result, sales of light beer in the United States went from a negligible amount before Miller Lite was introduced in 1973 to 44% of the United States beer market by 2002.

== History ==
The origins of Miller Lite can be traced to Meister Brau Lite, a reduced-calorie beer introduced in May 1967 by Chicago brewer Meister Brau, Inc. (formerly known as Peter Hand Brewery). Meister Brau spent two years developing the process to make Lite, using the enzyme amyloglucosidase to reduce residual carbohydrates. While the normal brewing process leaves small pieces of unfermented starch in finished beer, amyloglucosidase converts residual starches and dextrins into fermentable sugars, thereby reducing the calorie and carbohydrate content of the beer. Meister Brau obtained a trademark for "Lite" as the name of the beer.

A frequently repeated account that Meister Brau was given the amyloglucosidase process by Joseph Owades of New York’s Rheingold Brewery has no basis in fact. Although Rheingold did introduce a reduced-calorie beer called Gablinger’s in late 1966 that used an amyloglucosidase process that Rheingold obtained from Dr. Hersch Gablinger, Meister Brau successfully had the patent issued for Gablinger’s process invalidated in March 1970. When the lawsuit challenging the patent was announced, Meister Brau’s president, James W. Howard, stated that Meister Brau Lite was a unique product, that it did not infringe on the Gablinger patent, and that the process set forth in the Gablinger patent was known and used by others before the patent was applied for.

By 1972, Meister Brau, Inc. was in dire financial straits, and in June of that year, it sold its brands, including Lite, to the Miller Brewing Co. of Milwaukee.

Miller set about giving Lite more of a beer taste and spent more than a year testing 30 brewing formulas while retaining the amyloglucosidase process.

The new recipe was relaunched as "Lite" on packaging and in advertising in the test markets of Springfield, Illinois; Providence, Rhode Island; Knoxville, Tennessee; and San Diego, California, in 1973, and heavily marketed using masculine pro sports players and other "macho" figures of the day in an effort to sell to the key beer-drinking male demographic. Miller Lite was introduced nationally in 1975. and became the first successful mainstream light beer in the United States.

Miller's youth-oriented, heavy-advertising approach worked where the two previous light beers had failed, and Miller's early production totals of 12.8 million barrels quickly increased to 24.2 million barrels by 1977 as Miller rose to 2nd place in the American brewing marketplace. Other brewers responded, in particular Anheuser-Busch with its heavily advertised Bud Light in 1982, which eventually overtook Lite in sales by 1994. Anheuser-Busch played on the branding style of "Lite", boasting that next to Bud Light, "everything else is just a light". In 1992, light beers became the biggest domestic beer in America, and in 1998, Miller relabeled its "Lite" brand as "Miller Lite".

In 2008, Miller Brewing Company test-marketed three new recipes – an amber, a blonde ale, and a wheat – under the Miller Lite brand, marketed as Miller Lite Brewers Collection.

== Promotion ==
=== Advertising ===
The Miller Lite logo, 2003–2014

Miller Lite's long-running "Tastes Great!...Less Filling!" advertising campaign was ranked by Advertising Age (now Ad Age) magazine as the eighth greatest advertising campaign in history. The campaign was developed by the McCann-Erickson Worldwide advertising agency. During its peak, television commercials typically portrayed a Lite Beer drinker noting its great taste followed by another who observed that it was less filling. This usually led to a parody of Wild West saloon fights in which every patron got involved in the dispute for no real reason, though in this case it was always a shouting match, and blows were never thrown. The commercials were closed with a voice-over from actor Eddie Barth, who read the slogan, "Lite Beer from Miller: Everything you've always wanted in a beer. And less."

To attract 'Joe Sixpack' to a light beer, these commercials started to feature both elite ex-athletes such as Ray Nitschke, Ben Davidson, and Bubba Smith but also oddball cultural figures such as Mickey Spillane (accompanied by a blonde, Lee Meredith, who is better known for her role as Ulla, the secretary in The Producers), and comedian Rodney Dangerfield. As the series of commercials went on, it began featuring athletes and celebrities of all sorts. Some commercials from this era include:

- Former Major League catcher and Milwaukee Brewers broadcaster Bob Uecker being moved from his seat at a ballgame, and escorted away by an usher. Uecker exclaims "I must be in the front row," but ends up in the back row of the stands. This gave rise to the term "Bob Uecker seats". The ad itself was filmed at the Los Angeles Dodgers home field, Dodger Stadium.
- Heavyweight boxing champion Joe Frazier walking into a full bar as part of a barbershop quartet while the on-screen caption says "Joe Frazier, Famous Heavyweight Singer". The quartet sings "Do like Smokin' Joe" and the song goes on to praise Miller Lite's advantages.
- Former Baltimore Orioles first baseman Boog Powell and former umpire Jim Honochick doing a spot together, with Honochick unaware who he is standing next to, until he puts his glasses on at the end, and exclaims, "Hey, you're Boog Powell!"
- Footballer and actor Bubba Smith proclaims at the end of a spot, "I also love the easy-opening can", then tears off the top third of an aluminum Miller Lite can. In a later ad, pro ten-pin bowler Don Carter laments that bowlers are athletes too, and attempts to prove it by repeating Smith's feat, but struggles to do so.
- Former baseball player Marv Throneberry also starred in ads, usually making deadpan comment about being featured in the ad, despite his being known as an inept baseball player, quipping, "I don't know why they asked me to do this commercial."

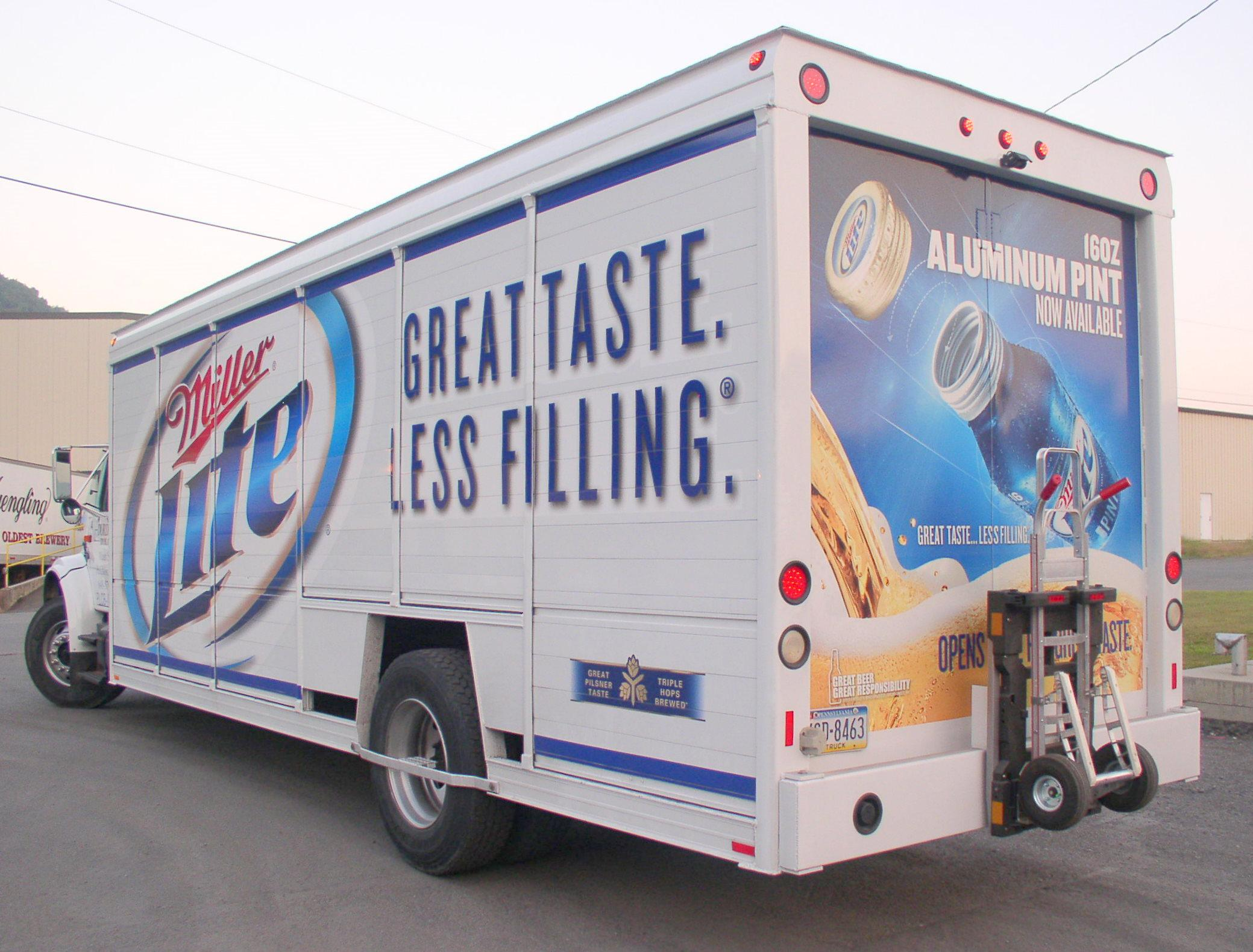
A delivery truck bearing Miller Lite's iconic "Tastes great. Less filling." slogan

As the popularity of the ads and the number of athletes and celebrities that appeared in them grew, Miller produced occasional "alumni" ads featuring all of the stars, generally in some sort of competition between the 'Less Fillings' and the 'Taste Greats'. The ads usually ended with Rodney Dangerfield somehow being the goat of the losing team. In one of the last spots to feature Dangerfield, the Miller Lite alumni are competing in a bowling match. It is the last frame of a tie game, and Ben Davidson grumbles to Dangerfield, "All we need is one pin, Rodney." Dangerfield rolls the ball down the lane, only to have it bounce horizontally off the head pin and into the gutter, knocking down zero pins.

As part of this campaign, Miller Brewing ran a series of television commercials in the winter of 1993-1994 showing several fictitious "extreme sports" such as "Wiener Dog Drag Racing" (which featured two wiener dogs racing each other at a drag racing strip), "Sumo High Dive" (which depicted a Japanese sumo wrestler diving off a platform) and "The Miss Perfect Face-Off" (which featured beauty pageant contestants playing ice hockey). The tag line that followed was, "If you can combine great taste with less filling, you can combine anything." and the question "Can your beer do this?"

In 1995–1996, Miller Lite ran the "Life Is Good" campaign, which showed drinkers' aspirational transition to more fun via a Miller Lite bottle tap, like "Beach Rewind", where three men on a beach admired three beautiful women walking by, and could rewind, and enjoy, the scene repeatedly. The campaign was developed by Leo Burnett Company, and received the American Marketing Association Effie award for outstanding advertising effectiveness. The campaign included celebrities such as Larry Bird, Keith Jackson, and Richard Karn.

Beginning January 12, 1997, a series of surrealistic Miller Lite ads, purportedly made by a man named "Dick", began to air. They were hallmarked as such either at the beginning or the end of the commercial. The campaign was developed by Minneapolis-based ad agency Fallon. The series of "Dick" commercials was directed by Gerald Casale of the new wave band Devo. Such commercials include one where a middle-aged man sees the message "twist to open" on a Miller Lite bottle cap, and he proceeds to do the Twist.

The ad campaign changed back to using high-profile celebrities who were either on opposite ends of the spectrum or had bragging rights to exchange with the other, which leads to them arguing about whether Miller Lite was better because of how "smooth" it tastes, or because of "the choice hops". Notable pairings included the following:

- George Brett and Robin Yount. Brett and Yount were both elected to the Baseball Hall of Fame in 1999 with 98 and 77 percent of the vote respectively while Yount won two MVP awards to Brett's one.
- Edgar Winter and George Hamilton. Winter's albinism was a stark contrast to the tanned look of Hamilton on screen.
- Ken Stabler and Dan Fouts. Stabler needles Fouts about never getting to or winning a Super Bowl while Fouts lets Stabler know about his inferior passing statistics.

In 2003, "Catfight", another high-profile commercial in the long-running "Tastes Great...Less Filling" campaign, was denounced by critics as depicting women as sexual objects. The commercial featured two beautiful young women, a blonde (Tanya Ballinger) and a brunette (Kitana Baker), discussing the classic "Tastes Great/Less Filling" debate, except they engaged in a catfight, hence the ad's title. The fight moving from a fountain to a mud pit, with the girls stripping each other of their clothing in the process. An uncensored version of the commercial ended with the women, stripped down to their underwear, sharing a passionate kiss. The girls received much publicity from the commercial, and later starred in a few related commercials, videos and events.

In 2006, Miller Lite had an advertising campaign called Man Laws featuring celebrities that include actor Burt Reynolds, professional wrestler Triple H, comedian Eddie Griffin, and former American football player Jerome Bettis. The celebrities and other actors were in a "Men of the Square Table", a group meeting where they discuss different situations that should be included in the "Man Laws". The ads were developed by the ad agency Crispin Porter + Bogusky/Miami, and were directed by comedy film director Peter Farrelly.

In June 2010, commercials premiered featuring actresses Lindsey McKeon and Nadine Heimann as bartenders.

=== Marketing ===
In December 2013, as part of a product placement marketing campaign with the film Anchorman 2: The Legend Continues, Miller reintroduced the 1974 navy-blue blackletter font "Lite" packaging on its 16-US-fluid-ounce (470 ml) cans for a limited time (the original 1972 cans used a light-blue script logo). However, the vintage packaging was such a success that by September 2014, the company decided to switch back to the vintage packaging full-time, including on bottles and tap handles, mirroring the unexpected success that PepsiCo had in 2009 with its Pepsi Throwback & Mountain Dew Throwback lines in tapping into the retro-themed packaging market. The unexpected sales increase, combined with wanting to differentiate the packaging from Bud Light, were factors in the decision, with some consumers even stating that Miller actually improved on the taste when nothing changed in the beer itself.

=== Sponsorship ===
==== Professional sports teams ====
Miller Lite is the official beer sponsor of the following:

===== NFL =====
- Atlanta Falcons
- Baltimore Ravens
- Buffalo Bills
- Carolina Panthers
- Chicago Bears
- Cincinnati Bengals
- Dallas Cowboys
- Detroit Lions
- Green Bay Packers
- Houston Texans
- Jacksonville Jaguars
- Minnesota Vikings
- New Orleans Saints
- New York Giants
- New York Jets
- Philadelphia Eagles
- Pittsburgh Steelers
- Tampa Bay Buccaneers
- Tennessee Titans

===== MLB =====
- Cleveland Guardians
- Detroit Tigers
- Milwaukee Brewers
- Pittsburgh Pirates

===== NBA =====
- Milwaukee Bucks

===== NCAA =====
- Rutgers Scarlet Knights.

==== Motorsport ====
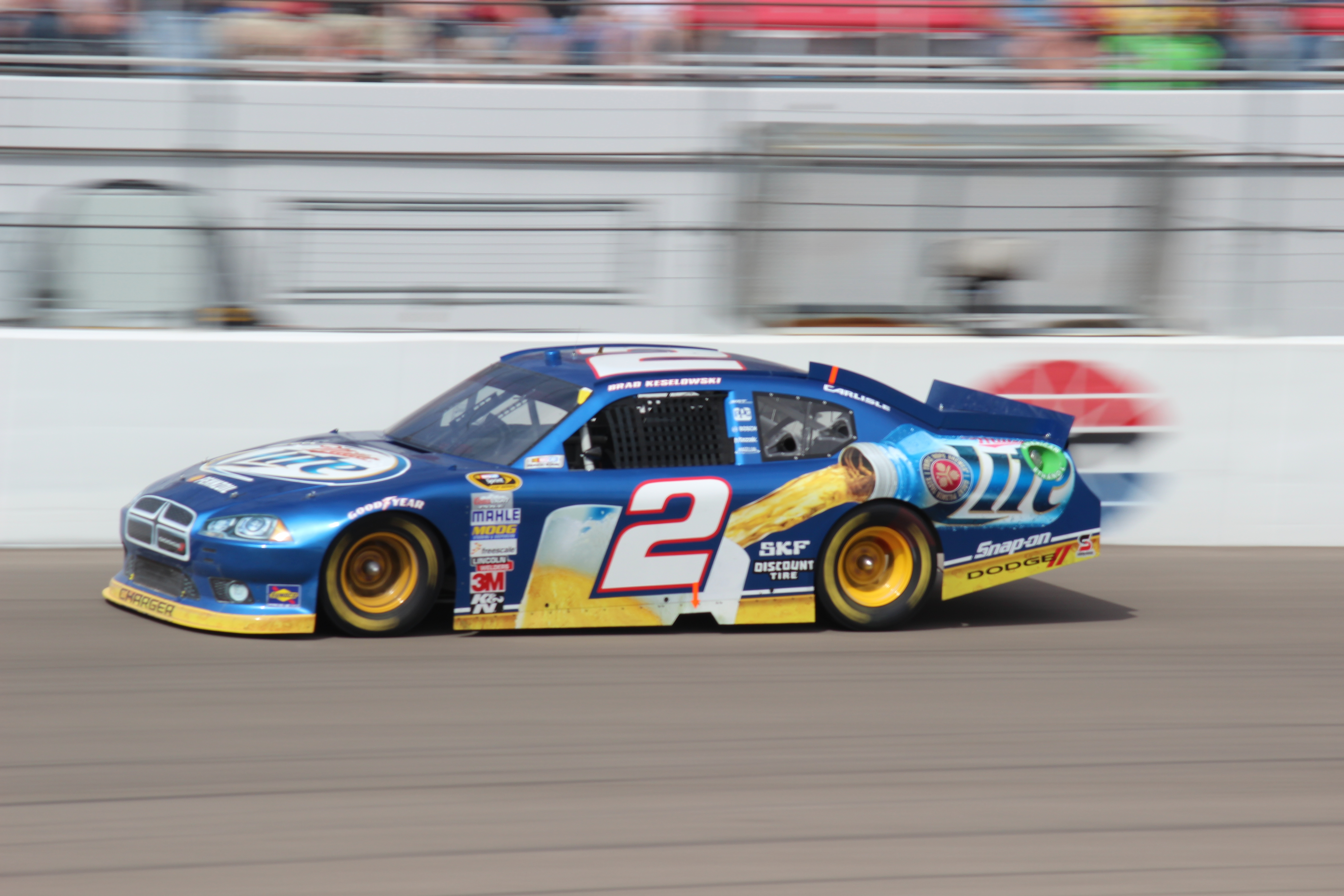
The Miller Lite car in 2012. The car's then driver, Brad Keselowski, won the Sprint Cup Series title that year

Miller Brewing Company began their NASCAR sponsorship in 1983 with driver Bobby Allison, advertising the Miller High Life brand and later in 1990 with driver Rusty Wallace, advertising the Miller Genuine Draft brand. In 1997, the company began advertising the Miller Lite brand on Wallace's #2 Penske Racing car. The car later earned the nickname "Blue Deuce", due to its number and blue paint scheme. Wallace retired following the 2005 season, and Kurt Busch was named as his replacement. Busch drove the "Blue Deuce" from 2006 to 2010. The car was driven by Brad Keselowski, who won the 2012 Sprint Cup Series championship. Molson Coors has since dropped the sponsorship from the #2 car, with the last sponsorship occurring during the 2020 Coca-Cola 600 and was replaced by sister company Keystone Light since 2021.
