= Gerry (2002 film) =

Film by Gus Van Sant

- Film poster
- Directed by: Gus Van Sant
- Written by: Casey Affleck; Matt Damon; Gus Van Sant
- Produced by: Dany Wolf
- Starring: Matt Damon; Casey Affleck
- Cinematography: Harris Savides
- Edited by: Casey Affleck; Matt Damon; Gus Van Sant
- Music by: Arvo Pärt
- Distributed by: THINKFilm
- Release dates: January 12, 2002 (Sundance); February 14, 2003 (United States)
- Running time: 103 minutes
- Country: United States
- Language: English
- Budget: $3.5 million
- Box office: $254,683

Gerry is a 2002 American drama film written and directed by Gus Van Sant, and starring and co-written by Matt Damon and Casey Affleck. It is the first installment of Van Sant's "Death Trilogy", three films based on deaths that occurred in real life and is succeeded by Elephant (2003) and Last Days (2005).

Gerry follows two hiking companions who both go by the name "Gerry". "Gerry" is also a slang term, used by both protagonists throughout the misadventure, meaning "to screw up". Van Sant revealed in interviews that Damon, Affleck, and his brother Ben had already coined the term prior to the title being chosen.

The plot shares some commonalities with the events surrounding the death of David Coughlin, who was killed after he and a friend became lost in Rattlesnake Canyon in New Mexico. The style was largely inspired by the work of Hungarian filmmaker Béla Tarr, namely its use of extended scenes playing out in uncut master shots. There are a few direct visual quotations from Tarr's Sátántangó (1994), such as a shot following the two protagonists while tumbleweeds blow around them that mimics a shot in Tarr's film where two men walk through a town as a windstorm blows around leaves and trash.

Besides the work of Tarr, the video game Tomb Raider was cited as an influence on the style. Van Sant had mentioned that he had not had much experience with video games and was struck by the fact that the lack of the ability to cut away from the action in video games meant having to stay with the characters during travel that would normally be glossed over in films. In an interview with Filmmaker Magazine, Van Sant stated "In some ways, Gerry is Béla Tarr fused with Tomb Raider!"

Gerry is frequently cited as an example of non-narrative cinema.

== Plot ==
On August 4, 1999, two men, both called Gerry, (based on Raffi Kodikian and David Coughlin) drive to a remote location to hike at a site marked "Wilderness Trail". As they start, they see some other hikers passing by. In order to not be bothered by these hikers, they decide to go off-trail. After some walking, talking, and an impromptu foot race, they decide to head back. Before long, they realize that they are lost. That night, they build a campfire.

Over the next couple of days, the two hikers wander through the wilderness without food or water. They try to split up for a while, retrace their steps and follow some animal tracks, all to no avail. They grow increasingly irritated with each other as the situation becomes dire.

On August 8, they eventually find themselves slowly walking mostly in silence through a desert. They finally collapse due to fatigue and dehydration. The weaker of the two (Coughlin) proclaims that he is "leaving" and reaches towards Gerry (Kodikian). Gerry rolls on top of Gerry and wordlessly strangles him before collapsing again.

After some time, Gerry awakens and realizes that a highway is not far away. In the final sequence, he is badly sunburned but watches the passing landscape from the car of the father and son who have seemingly rescued him.

== Production ==
The inspiration for the film was the real-life murder of David Coughlin, which Damon related to Van Sant, in which Coughlin and his best friend got lost in the desert, with the latter eventually killing Coughlin. Van Sant deliberately chose not to look up more information on the event because "we didn't want to do their story," instead deciding it would be "an inspirational aside".

Besides the news item, other influences include Van Sant's own experience getting lost as well as Chantal Akerman's Jeanne Dielman, 23 quai du Commerce, 1080 Bruxelles (1975). Initially Van Sant planned to shoot the film with digital video, which he said would have resembled "a John Cassavetes film in the desert". Casey Affleck eventually convinced him to use 35 mm film instead, with Van Sant noting, "once we did that, everything changed". From this decision he began incorporating influences from the film work of Béla Tarr, specifically his use of long takes.

The film is notable for its lack of dialogue. Initially Van Sant "thought we were definitely going to have a lot of long bits of soul-searching dialogue." During shooting this never came to pass, and Van Sant asserted that the long silences were "our version" of such dialogue. Van Sant wanted the spare dialogue not to cover things for the audience's sake; he explained, "When [Matt and Casey] are talking, they're just talking and not pointing out stuff that we're supposed to know. If they're talking about something, and we don't know what they're talking about, then that's okay. So long as they know what they're talking about."

Van Sant hoped to shoot the film in Argentina to avoid a possible Actors Guild strike, but the location proved colder than anticipated. He then looked to Wadi Rum in Jordan, but he was dissuaded from going there because a travel advisory was in effect due to potential terrorist activities. The team finally settled on Death Valley, California. Although the film had a script, it was used as more of an outline, and the team regularly disregarded it. They were unsure of how the film would end if the film was shot in sequence.

The film is dedicated to the memory of American writer Ken Kesey.

== Critical reception ==
The film received generally mixed critical reviews. On the review aggregator website Rotten Tomatoes, it has an approval rating of 61%, based on 100 reviews, with an average rating of 6.20/10. The website’s critics consensus states that Gerry is "The type of uncompromising film that divides filmgoers over whether it is profound or pretentious." Metacritic, using a weighted average, assigned the film a score of 54 out of 100 based on 31 reviews, indicating "mixed or average" reviews.

== See also ==
- Narrativity
