= Murder of David Coughlin =

1999 murder in New Mexico, United States

David Coughlin
- Born: Boston, Massachusetts, U.S.
- Died: August 8, 1999; Carlsbad Caverns National Park, New Mexico, U.S.
- Cause of death: Stabbing
- Known for: Apparent mercy killing by his friend

David Coughlin was killed in 1999 in the desert of southern New Mexico after he and Raffi Kodikian got lost while hiking. Kodikian later pleaded no contest to second-degree murder, saying that it had been a mercy killing, and served 16 months. He was released in November 2001.

== Rattlesnake Canyon ==
Kodikian and Coughlin, best friends since college, were in their twenties and lived in Boston, Massachusetts. Kodikian was an aspiring journalist and Coughlin was a traffic policy analyst. In July 1999, the two set off on a road trip from Boston to California, where Coughlin planned to attend graduate school. On August 4, they arrived at Rattlesnake Canyon in Carlsbad Caverns National Park and made camp.

After days of hiking, the two became lost and dehydrated. Kodikian and Coughlin had only brought three pints (1.42 liters) of water and one pint (0.47 liters) of Gatorade. One pint of water was used to boil hot dogs during their first evening in the canyon. Although they had a topographical map, neither knew how to properly read it. The two took extreme measures, including licking rocks, eating cactus fruit, and even drinking their own urine. Kodikian abandoned the idea of drinking his own urine after gagging.

The third night, Coughlin began vomiting, according to Kodikian. On August 8, Kodikian wrote in his journal:

I killed & burried [sic] my best friend today. Dave had been in pain all night. At around 5 or 6, he turned to me and begged that I put my knife through his chest. I did, and a second time when he wouldn't die.

Lance Mattson, a park ranger who had been searching for the campers, discovered Kodikian badly dehydrated. When the ranger inquired about Coughlin, Kodikian pointed to a pile of rocks and replied, "I killed him."

== Investigation and trial ==
Kodikian's attorney, Gary Mitchell, described the killing as an act of kindness. He further stated that it was part of a death pact between the friends and that Kodikian intended to kill himself too, but was too weak to do so. Eddy County sheriff Michael A. Click stated that Kodikian was "moderately to severely dehydrated", and was not close to dying when Mattson found him. Authorities further noted that Kodikian had buried Coughlin's body under rocks, some weighing more than 70 pounds (32 kg). The weight of the rocks and the completion of the task seemed remarkable for someone seriously dehydrated. The autopsy on Coughlin revealed that while he was dehydrated, it did not appear to be fatal.

One theory was that Coughlin confessed to having earlier had a liaison with Kodikian's ex-girlfriend. Click sent Capt. Eddie Carrasco to Boston to investigate, but Carrasco discovered nothing.

No one I talked with ever heard a cross word between them. They were the best of friends.

At his trial, Kodikian pleaded guilty to second-degree murder. During the sentencing part of Kodikian's trial, it became clear that Coughlin's vomiting was not indicative of severe dehydration but instead was most likely a reaction to unripe cactus fruit.

While Kodikian faced a possible maximum penalty of 20 years in prison, he was instead sentenced by District Judge Jay Forbes to 15 years with all but two years suspended, followed by five years of probation. The family of Coughlin released a statement saying that although questions remained, they did not believe Kodikian had malicious intent.

== See also ==
- Gerry, a 2002 film which was inspired by the event.
