= Houston Film Critics Society Awards 2010 =

Annual US film awards ceremony

4th Houston Film Critics Society Awards
- Date: December 18, 2010
- Location: Museum of Fine Arts; Houston, Texas
- Country: United States
- Presented by: Houston Film Critics Society
- Website: houstonfilmcritics.com/awards

The 4th Houston Film Critics Society Awards were presented on December 18, 2010. These awards for "extraordinary accomplishment in film" are presented annually by the Houston Film Critics Society (HFCS) based in Houston, Texas. The organization, founded in 2007, includes 22 film critics for print, radio, television, and internet publications in the greater Houston area. The awards are co-sponsored by the Houston Film Commission, Southwest Alternate Media Project, Women in Film and Television/Houston, WorldFest, and the Houston Cinema Arts Society.

The nominations for the 2010 awards were announced on December 12, 2010. Eligible films do not need to have played or opened in a Houston film theater prior to the nomination deadline, merely made available to the HFCS membership at a screening or on DVD. Along with the 13 "best of" category awards, this year also saw the introduction of a new category for "Worst Movies of the Year". The Social Network, True Grit, and 127 Hours each received six nominations, all including the Best Picture, Actor, Direction, and Original Score categories.

The Social Network was the HFCS's most awarded film of 2010 taking top honors in the Best Picture, Best Director (David Fincher), Best Actor (Jesse Eisenberg), and Best Screenplay (Aaron Sorkin) categories. Inception was the only other film to garner multiple awards, winning both the Best Original Score (Hans Zimmer) and Best Cinematography (Wally Pfister) prizes. The other acting awards went to Natalie Portman as Best Actress for Black Swan, Hailee Steinfeld as Best Supporting Actress for True Grit, and Christian Bale as Best Supporting Actor for The Fighter. The remaining film honors went to Toy Story 3 as Best Animated Film, Restrepo as Best Documentary, and The Girl with the Dragon Tattoo as Best Foreign Language Film. "We Are Sex Bob-Omb" by Beck from Scott Pilgrim vs. the World was named the Best Original Song. The HFCS's first-ever award for "Worst Picture" was given to Jonah Hex starring Josh Brolin.

In addition to the category awards, the HFCS presented their annual Lifetime Achievement Award to Sissy Spacek and its Humanitarian Award to George Clooney. Clooney was selected for "selflessly using his celebrity for greater good". The HFCS award for Outstanding Achievement in Cinema awards were presented to Charles Dove, director of the Rice University Media Center, and Hector Luna, the founder and editor of C-47 Houston.

== Ceremony ==
The 2010 awards were given out at a ceremony held at the Museum of Fine Arts on December 18, 2010. The award ceremony was free and open to the general public. While organizers did not expect any of the nominees in the "best of" category awards to be in attendance, director Edgar Wright recorded a thank-you clip which was shown. The ceremony also included clips of nominated films plus special tributes to George Clooney and Sissy Spacek, and was followed by a catered reception with the members of the HFCS in the museum gallery. Catering for the reception was provided by Central Market.

== Winners and nominees ==
Winners are listed first and highlighted with boldface.

=== Category awards ===
Best Picture	Best Foreign Language Film
**The Social Network**; 127 Hours; Black Swan; Inception; Kick-Ass; The Kids Are All Right; The King's Speech; Toy Story 3; True Grit; Winter's Bone	**The Girl with the Dragon Tattoo** • Sweden; Biutiful • Mexico; Carlos • France/Germany; Mother • South Korea; The Secret in Their Eyes • Argentina
Best Performance by an Actor in a Leading Role	Best Performance by an Actress in a Leading Role
**Jesse Eisenberg** - The Social Network; Jeff Bridges - True Grit; Robert Duvall - Get Low; Colin Firth - The King's Speech; James Franco - 127 Hours	**Natalie Portman** - Black Swan; Annette Bening - The Kids Are All Right; Nicole Kidman - Rabbit Hole; Jennifer Lawrence - Winter's Bone; Noomi Rapace - The Girl with the Dragon Tattoo
Best Performance by an Actor in a Supporting Role	Best Performance by an Actress in a Supporting Role
**Christian Bale** - The Fighter; Andrew Garfield - The Social Network; Bill Murray - Get Low; Jeremy Renner - The Town; Geoffrey Rush - The King's Speech	**Hailee Steinfeld** - True Grit; Helena Bonham Carter - The King's Speech; Melissa Leo - The Fighter; Julianne Moore - The Kids Are All Right; Jacki Weaver - Animal Kingdom
Best Direction of a Motion Picture	Best Cinematography
**David Fincher** - The Social Network; Darren Aronofsky - Black Swan; Danny Boyle - 127 Hours; Joel and Ethan Coen - True Grit; Christopher Nolan - Inception	**Wally Pfister** - Inception; Anthony Dod Mantle and Enrique Chediak - 127 Hours; Matthew Libatique - Black Swan; Eduardo Serra - Harry Potter and the Deathly Hallows – Part 1; Roger Deakins - True Grit
Best Animated Feature Film	Best Documentary Feature
**Toy Story 3**; Despicable Me; How to Train Your Dragon; Megamind; Tangled	**Restrepo**; Client 9: The Rise and Fall of Eliot Spitzer; Marwencol; The Tillman Story; Waiting for "Superman"
Best Original Score	Best Original Song
**Hans Zimmer** - Inception; A. R. Rahman - 127 Hours; John Powell - How to Train Your Dragon; Trent Reznor and Atticus Ross - The Social Network; Carter Burwell - True Grit	**"We Are Sex Bob-Omb"** by Beck - Scott Pilgrim vs. the World; "The Clap" by Dan Bern and Mike Viola - Get Him to the Greek; "If I Rise" by A. R. Rahman, Dido Armstrong and Rollo Armstrong - 127 Hours; "Shine" by John Legend - Waiting for "Superman"; "You Haven't Seen the Last of Me" performed by Cher and written by Diane Warren - Burlesque
Best Screenplay	Worst Picture
**Aaron Sorkin** - The Social Network; Christopher Nolan - Inception; Lisa Cholodenko and Stuart Blumberg - The Kids Are All Right; John Lasseter, Andrew Stanton, Lee Unkrich and Michael Arndt - Toy Story 3; Debra Granik and Anne Rosellini - Winter's Bone	**Jonah Hex**; Furry Vengeance; The Last Airbender; Sex and the City 2; Splice

=== Individual awards ===
==== Lifetime Achievement Award ====
- Sissy Spacek

==== Humanitarian Award ====
- George Clooney

==== Outstanding Achievement in Cinema ====
- Charles Dove, director of the Rice University Media Center
- Hector Luna, founder and editor of C-47 Houston magazine
