= Between a Rock and a Hard Place (book) =

2004 book by Aron Ralston

- Author: Aron Ralston
- Language: English
- Genre: Non-fiction
- Publisher: Atria Books
- Publication date: 2004
- Publication place: United States
- English publication date: September 7, 2004
- Pages: 354
- ISBN: 978-0-7434-9281-2

Between a Rock and a Hard Place is a 2004 autobiographical book by American mountain climber Aron Ralston. It details an incident that occurred in 2003 when Ralston was canyoneering in Bluejohn Canyon in the Utah desert, where he became trapped for five days.

== Synopsis ==
The book predominantly recounts Ralston's experience being trapped in the canyon and how he was forced to amputate his own right arm with a dull multi-tool in order to free himself after the arm became trapped by a boulder.

It also describes Ralston's childhood, how he took up outdoor activities after moving to Colorado from Indiana, how he came to be an obsessive outdoorsman and how he left his engineering career at Intel in Arizona to take up outdoor activities as much as possible.

The book goes back and forth, in alternating chapters, between Ralston's past experiences and his entrapment in the slot canyon, and the efforts of his mother to find him. Included in some editions are pictures of his days in the canyon, various photos from the past excursions he speaks of in the book, a glossary of mountaineering jargon, and maps of Bluejohn Canyon and the proximity of the canyon in central-eastern Utah.

== Reception ==
Inc. magazine named Ralston's account one of seven "great entrepreneurship books that have nothing to do with business."

== Adaptation ==
The book was adapted into the 2010 film 127 Hours, starring James Franco as Ralston and directed by Danny Boyle. Since the film's release, the autobiography has also been sold with the title 127 Hours: Between a Rock and a Hard Place. The film was nominated for six Academy Awards, including Best Picture and Best Actor.
