= If I Rise =

Single by A. R. Rahman and Dido

from the album 127 Hours: Music from the Motion Picture
- Released: 2 November 2010
- Recorded: 2010
- Studio: K. M. Musiq Studios (Los Angeles, CA); AIR Studios (London, UK); Miloko Studios (London, UK); Hear No Evil Recording Studios (London, UK); Panchathan Record Inn and AM Studios (Chennai, India); Nirvana Studios (Mumbai, India)
- Genre: Ambient pop
- Length: 4:38
- Label: Interscope Records
- Songwriters: A. R. Rahman; Dido; Rollo Armstrong
- Producer: A. R. Rahman

Music video
- "If I Rise" on YouTube

"If I Rise" is a song performed by A. R. Rahman and Dido, composed by A. R. Rahman, with lyrics by Dido and Rollo Armstrong. The song featured as the main theme for the Danny Boyle film 127 Hours.

The song won numerous awards including Broadcast Film Critics Association Award and Denver Film Critics Society Award. It was also nominated for Best Song Award at the Academy Awards and World Soundtrack Awards.

== Background ==
The song was featured in the climax scene of the film. The chorus portion of the song is sung by The Gleehive Children's Choir, Mumbai. The choir includes Jervis Dias, Kristen Fernandes, Alisha Pais, Jessica Dmello, Sherize Alveyn, Evania Cerejo, Jemima Fernandes, and Aidan D'silva. The portion was recorded at Octavious Studio, Bandra, Mumbai. The song was nominated for an Academy Award in the category of Best Original Song.

== Music video ==
The song was first picturised in the climax scene of the film. The official music video, featuring Dido and A. R. Rahman, was released in February 2011. Dido first confirmed on her official website that she and Rahman were going to film a video for the song. The music video was premiered on the Wall Street Journal website on 17 February. It has A. R. Rahman playing harpejji, which was the major instrument used in the track, and Dido singing the track along with Rahman. A few scenes from the film, mainly featuring James Franco, are also used in the video.

== Live performances ==
A. R. Rahman performing the song live at the Oscars

Florence Welch was asked by Dido, who was pregnant at the time, to perform "If I Rise" at the Academy Awards. She was joined by A. R. Rahman for the first live performance of the song.

== Accolades ==
| Award | Result |
|---|---|
| Academy Award for Best Original Song | Nominated |
| Broadcast Film Critics Association Award for Best Song | Won |
| Denver Film Critics Society Award for Best Song | Won |
| Houston Film Critics Society Award for Best Original Song | Nominated |
| Las Vegas Film Critics Society Award for Best Song | Nominated |
| Satellite Award for Best Original Song | Nominated |
| World Soundtrack Award for Best Original Song Written Directly for a Film | Nominated |

The song was nominated for an Academy Award in the category of Best Original Song. However, it lost to Randy Newman's "We Belong Together" from Toy Story 3. The Academy's decision not to award Rahman for the song evoked widespread criticisms in India. Apart from public responses, several actors also commented on it. Shabana Azmi said, "A. R. Rahman truly deserved the Oscar for Best Song this year." Konkona Sen Sharma also tweeted the same opinion. Sandhya Mridul said, "A.R Rahman stands apart he deserves every win". However, Rahman himself has stated that he personally believes Newman deserved the award.

== Cover version ==
Katie Campbell single cover

A single titled "Hours - If I Rise (vocal) Remix" was released on 4 February 2012. This is credited as performed by Katie Campbell (an artist with credits including a wide variety of cover versions of original famous and semi-popular movie songs) & Brian "Hacksaw" Williams, and notes a runtime of 3:03.
