= Aron Ralston =

American mountaineer (born 1975)

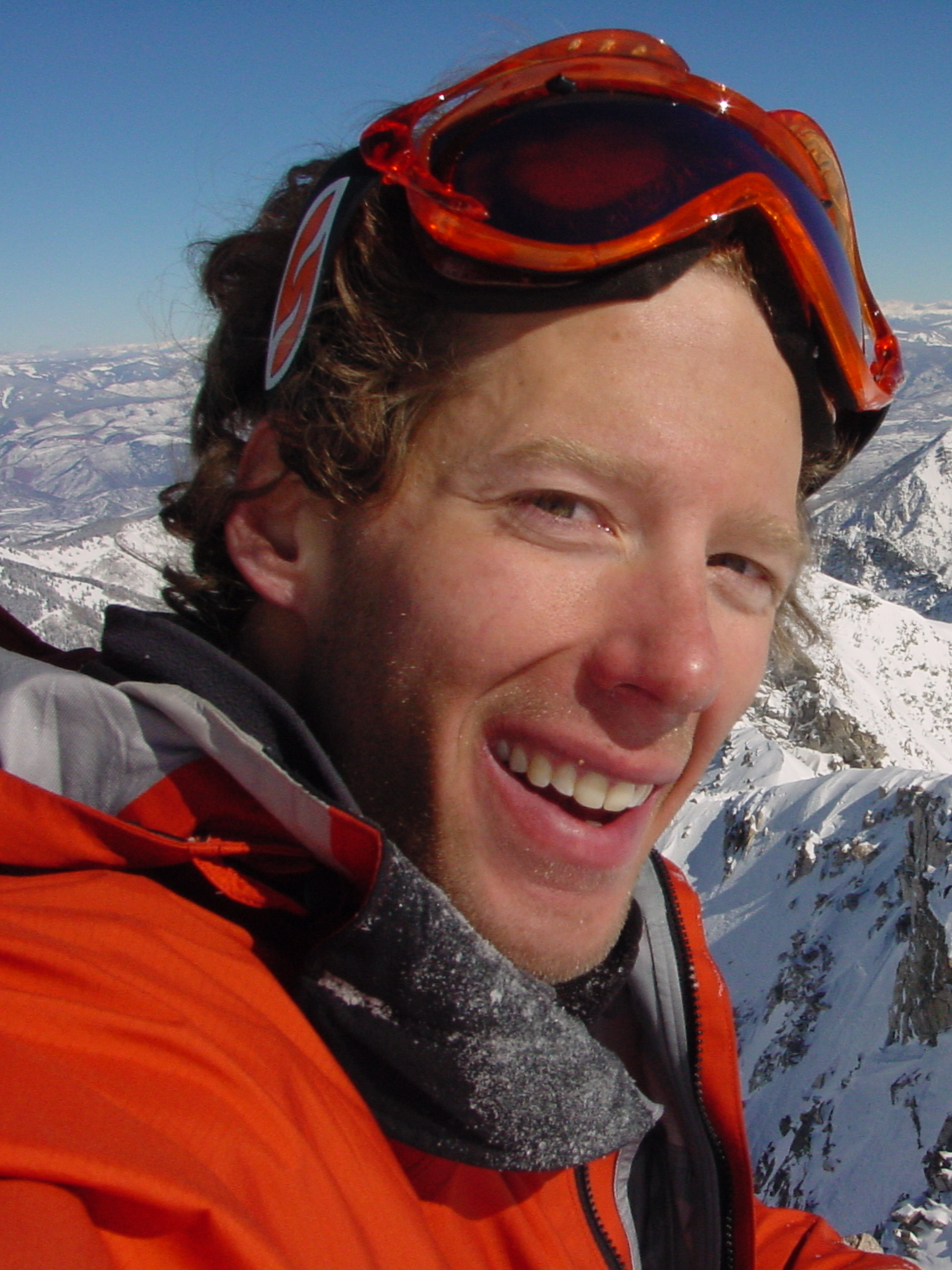
- Ralston on Capitol Peak in February 2003
- Born: Aron Lee Ralston; October 27, 1975 (age 51); Marion, Ohio, U.S.
- Education: Carnegie Mellon University (BA)
- Occupations: Motivational speaker; mountaineer; mechanical engineer
- Known for: Surviving a canyoneering accident by cutting off part of his own right arm
- Spouse: Jessica Trusty (m. 2009; div. 2012)
- Partner: Vita Shannon (2012–2013)
- Children: 2

Aron Lee Ralston (born October 27, 1975) is an American mountaineer, mechanical engineer, and motivational speaker. He survived a canyoneering accident in 2003 by cutting off part of his own right arm.

On April 26, 2003, during a solo descent of Bluejohn Canyon in southeastern Utah, Ralston dislodged a boulder, pinning his right wrist to the side of the canyon wall. After five days, he had to break his forearm and amputate it with a dull pocket knife to break free. Ralston then made his way through the rest of the canyon, rappelled down a 65-foot (20 m) drop, and hiked 7 miles (11 km) before being rescued.

The incident is documented in Ralston's autobiography Between a Rock and a Hard Place, which was later adapted into the film 127 Hours, in which he is portrayed by James Franco. After the accident, he continued mountaineering and became the first person to ascend all of Colorado's fourteeners solo in winter.

== Early life ==
Aron Lee Ralston was born on October 27, 1975, in Marion, Ohio. At age 12, his family relocated to Denver, Colorado where he attended Cherry Creek High School and learned how to ski and backpack. He attended Carnegie Mellon University in Pittsburgh where he double-majored in mechanical engineering and French and minored in piano. He received his B.S. in mechanical engineering and French in 1997. At Carnegie Mellon, he served as a resident assistant, studied abroad, and was an active intramural sports participant. He worked as a rafting guide during the summer.

Ralston worked as a mechanical engineer with Intel in Chandler, Tacoma and Albuquerque for five years, but felt burnt out from working at a large corporation. During his time as an engineer, he built his skills in mountaineering, and in 2002, he quit his job to climb Denali. He moved to Aspen, Colorado with the intention to live his life climbing mountains.

Ralston began working towards his goal of climbing all of Colorado's "fourteeners"—peaks over 14,000 feet (4,270 m), of which there are 59 total, and 53 ranked peaks, solo during winter (a feat that had never before been recorded). In 2003, he was caught in a Grade 5 avalanche on Resolution Peak, Colorado with his skiing partners Mark Beverly and Chadwick Spencer. No one was seriously injured, but his friends did not speak to him in the aftermath, causing him to reevaluate his approach to risk management.

== Canyoneering accident ==
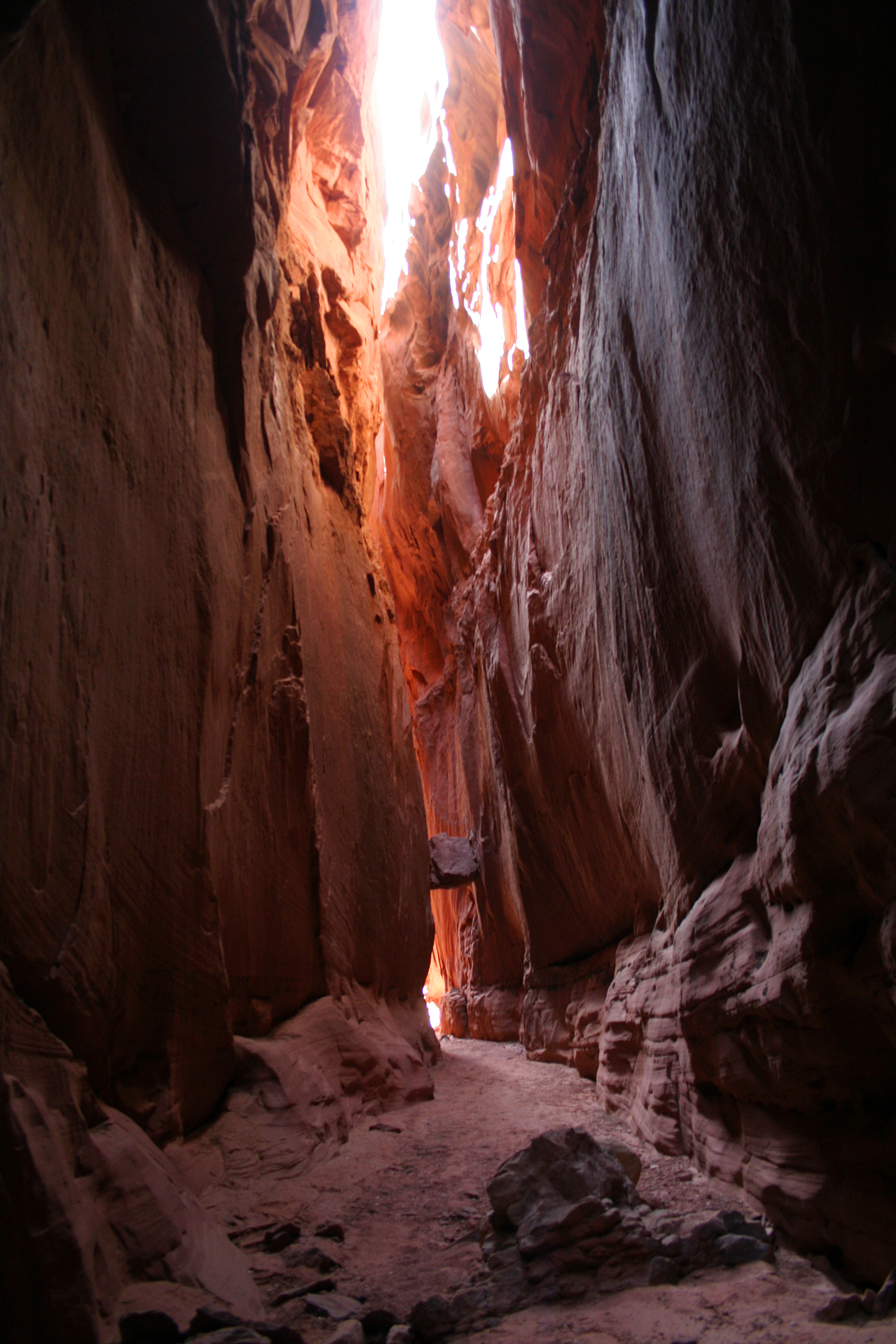
The main fork of Bluejohn canyon, well above the site of Ralson's accident

On the afternoon of April 26, 2003, Aron Ralston was canyoneering alone through Bluejohn Canyon, in eastern Wayne County, Utah, just south of the Horseshoe Canyon unit of Canyonlands National Park. During his descent into the lower stretches of the slot canyon, a suspended boulder dislodged. It first smashed against his left hand, and then crushed his right hand, pinning it against the canyon wall. Ralston had not informed anyone of his hiking plans, nor did he have any way to call for help.

Assuming that he would die without intervention, he spent five days rationing his small amount of remaining water, approximately 350 ml (12 imp fl oz), and slowly eating his remaining food, two burritos, while repeatedly trying to extricate his arm. His efforts were futile as he was unable to free his arm from the 800lb chockstone. After three days of trying to lift and chip away at the boulder, the dehydrated and delirious Ralston prepared to amputate his trapped arm in order to escape. After experimenting with tourniquets, and making exploratory superficial cuts to his forearm, he realized, on the fourth day, that in order to free his arm he would have to cut through the bone. His available tools were insufficient to do so.

After running out of food and water on the fifth day, Ralston decided to drink his own urine. He carved his name, date of birth and presumed date of death into the sandstone canyon wall, and videotaped his last goodbyes to his family. He did not expect to survive the night, but as he attempted to stay warm, he began hallucinating. He describes having had a vision of himself playing with a future child while missing part of his right arm. Ralston credited his hallucination to giving him the belief that he would live.

When he woke on the sixth day, he discovered his arm had begun to decompose due to lack of circulation, and he desperately felt the need to tear it off. Ralston then had an epiphany: he could break his radius and ulna using torque against his trapped arm. He did so, then amputated his forearm with his multi-tool, using the dull 2-inch (50 mm) knife, and pliers for the tougher tendons. The painful process took an hour, during which he used tubing from a CamelBak as a tourniquet, taking care to leave major arteries until last. The manufacturer of the multi-tool was never named, but Ralston said, "it was not a Leatherman but what you'd get if you bought a $15 flashlight and got a free multi-use tool."

After freeing himself, Ralston climbed out of the slot canyon in which he had been trapped, rappelled down a 65-foot (20 m) sheer wall, then hiked out of the canyon. He was 8 miles (13 km) from his vehicle, and had no phone. However, after 6 miles (9.7 km) of hiking, he encountered a family on vacation from the Netherlands; Eric and Monique Meijer and their son Andy, who gave him food and water and hurried to alert the authorities. Ralston had feared he would bleed to death; he had lost 40 pounds (18 kg), including 25% of his blood volume. Rescuers searching for Ralston, alerted by his family that he was missing, had narrowed the search down to Canyonlands and he was picked up by a helicopter in a wide area of the canyon. He was rescued approximately four hours after amputating his arm.

Ralston later said that if he had amputated his arm earlier, he would have bled to death before being found, while if he had not done it he would have been found dead in the slot canyon days later.

His severed hand and forearm were retrieved from under the boulder by park authorities. According to television presenter Tom Brokaw, it took 13 men, a winch and a hydraulic jack to move the boulder so that Ralston's arm could be removed. His arm was then cremated and its ashes given to Ralston. He returned to the accident scene with Brokaw and a camera crew six months later, on his 28th birthday, to film a Dateline NBC special about the accident in which he scattered the ashes of his arm there, where he said they belong.

== After the accident ==
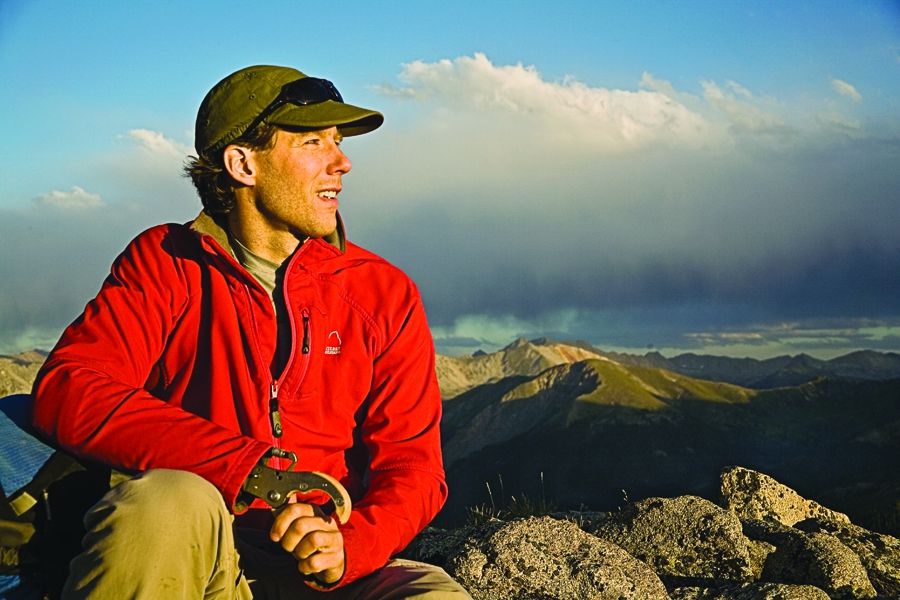
Ralston in the mountains of central Colorado, near Independence Pass, Aspen, in 2009

After the accident occurred, Ralston made numerous appearances in the media. On July 21, 2003, Ralston appeared on the Late Show with David Letterman, and his story was featured by GQ's "Men of the Year" and Vanity Fair's "People of 2003".

Ralston documented his experience in an autobiographical book titled Between a Rock and a Hard Place, published by Atria Books in September 2004. It reached No. 3 on The New York Times Hardcover Non-Fiction list. It hit No. 1 in New Zealand and Australia, and is the No. 7 best-selling memoir of all-time in the United Kingdom. Later that month, Ralston's story was featured on a two-hour edition of Dateline NBC called "Desperate Days in Blue John Canyon".

Ralston has appeared twice on The Today Show, Good Morning America, and The Tonight Show with Jay Leno. He has also appeared on The Howard Stern Show, The Ellen DeGeneres Show, CNN's American Morning with Bill Hemmer, Minute to Win It, Anderson Cooper 360°, CNN Saturday Morning, Enough Rope, and CNBC with Deborah Norville. On September 28, 2004, he appeared on the radio program The Bob Rivers Show and described his ordeal as "six days of terror and horror."

After his recovery he continued to climb mountains, including Aconcagua in 2005, and in 2008, Ojos del Salado in Chile and Monte Pissis in Argentina. In 2005, Ralston became the first person to climb all of the 59 ranked and/or named Colorado's 'fourteeners' solo in winter, a project he initially started in 1997.

In 2006, Ralston was featured as a panelist in Miller Lite's "Man Laws" ad campaign.

He later noted that his survival after being trapped in the canyon had given him a sense of invincibility rather than humbleness. He lost friends to suicide, and became depressed after his girlfriend broke up with him in 2006. He has since tried to shift his focus away from adventure-seeking for self-esteem purposes.

In 2008, Ralston signed on to advise polar explorer Eric Larsen on his 2009–2010 "Save the Poles" expedition, of traveling to the north and south poles, and climbing Mount Everest (sometimes referred to as the third pole) within the same year.

In August 2009, Ralston married Jessica Trusty. Their first child was born in February 2010. They divorced in early 2012.

In 2011, Ralston was a contestant on the American television show Minute to Win It, where he won $125,000 for Wilderness Workshop, made a cameo on The Simpsons in "Treehouse of Horror XXII", took part in the reality show Alone in the Wild, where he had to 'survive' in the wild with a video camera and a bag of supplies, and delivered the commencement speech at Carnegie Mellon University for the graduating class of 2011.

He has also appeared on the Comedy Central show Tosh.0 in a sketch with host Daniel Tosh and another climber in 2012.

=== Assault charge ===
In December 2013, Ralston and his girlfriend, Vita Shannon, who have a daughter together, were both arrested after an altercation at their home. The circumstances of the altercation are unclear. Charges against Ralston were dropped shortly after, and charges against Shannon were dropped after Ralston did not show up to a court hearing. According to the affidavit, Ralston "was struck twice in the back of the head with fists by (Shannon), after an argument they had regarding the victim's other son." Shannon alleged in return that Ralston "shoved her on the shoulder."

=== Public speaking ===
As a corporate speaker, Ralston receives an honorarium of about $25,000 per domestic speaking appearance, and up to $37,000 for international speeches. On May 4, 2007, Ralston appeared at the Swiss Economic Forum and gave a speech about how he "lost his hand, but gained his life back."

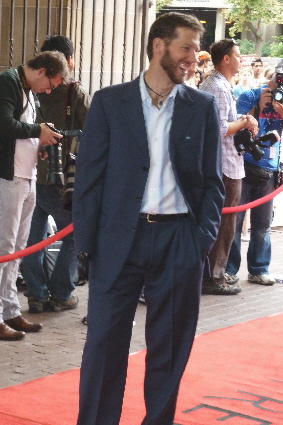
Ralston at the Toronto premiere of 127 Hours

== 127 Hours ==
British film director Danny Boyle directed the film 127 Hours about Ralston's accident. Filming took place in March and April 2010, with a release in New York City and Los Angeles on November 5, 2010. Fox Searchlight Pictures funded the film. Actor James Franco played the role of Ralston. The movie received standing ovations at both the Telluride Film Festival and the Toronto International Film Festival. Some of the audience members in Toronto fainted during the final amputation scene.

The film received widespread acclaim by critics; review aggregator Rotten Tomatoes reports that 93% of 239 critics have given the film a positive review, with an average rating of 8.2/10.

At the 83rd Academy Awards in 2011 the film was nominated for six Oscars, including Best Picture (won by The King's Speech) and Best Actor for Franco (won by Colin Firth for his role in The King's Speech). 127 Hours was also nominated in the categories for Best Adapted Screenplay, Best Original Score, Best Original Song, and Best Editing.

Of the authenticity of 127 Hours, Ralston has said that the film is "so factually accurate it is as close to a documentary as you can get and still be a drama," and he jokingly added that he thought it is "the best film ever made."
