= 127 Hours =

2010 film by Danny Boyle

- Theatrical release poster
- Directed by: Danny Boyle
- Screenplay by: Danny Boyle; Simon Beaufoy
- Based on: Between a Rock and a Hard Place by Aron Ralston
- Produced by: Danny Boyle; Christian Colson; John Smithson
- Starring: James Franco; Amber Tamblyn; Kate Mara
- Cinematography: Anthony Dod Mantle; Enrique Chediak
- Edited by: Jon Harris
- Music by: A. R. Rahman
- Production companies: Pathé; Everest Entertainment; Film4; HandMade Films; Cloud Eight Films
- Distributed by: Pathé (United Kingdom; through Warner Bros. Pictures); Fox Searchlight Pictures (International)
- Release dates: 4 September 2010 (Telluride Film Festival); 5 November 2010 (United States); 7 January 2011 (United Kingdom)
- Running time: 94 minutes
- Countries: United Kingdom; United States
- Language: English
- Budget: $18 million
- Box office: $60.7 million

127 Hours is a 2010 biographical drama film co-written, produced, and directed by Danny Boyle. The film mainly stars James Franco, with Kate Mara, Amber Tamblyn, and Clémence Poésy appearing in brief supporting roles. In the film, canyoneer Aron Ralston (Franco) must find a way to escape after he gets trapped by a boulder in an isolated slot canyon in Bluejohn Canyon, southeastern Utah, on April 26, 2003. It is a British and American venture produced by Pathé, Everest Entertainment, Film4, HandMade Films and Cloud Eight Films.

The film, based on Ralston's memoir Between a Rock and a Hard Place (2004), was written by Boyle and Simon Beaufoy, co-produced by Christian Colson and John Smithson, and scored by A. R. Rahman. Beaufoy, Colson, and Rahman had all previously worked with Boyle on Slumdog Millionaire (2008). 127 Hours premiered at the Telluride Film Festival on 4 September 2010, and was released in the United States on 5 November 2010 and in the United Kingdom on 7 January 2011. It was acclaimed by critics and audiences and grossed $60.7 million worldwide. It was selected by the American Film Institute as one of the top 10 films of 2010 and was nominated for six Academy Awards, including Best Actor for Franco and Best Picture. The film also received nominations for eight British Academy Film Awards and three Golden Globe Awards.

The film's title refers to the total duration from when Ralston was stranded in Bluejohn Canyon, once his arm was trapped underneath a boulder, to when he was rescued.

== Plot ==
On April 26, 2003, avid mountaineer Aron Ralston goes hiking at Utah's Canyonlands National Park without telling anyone. He befriends lost hikers Kristi and Megan and gives them directions. While guiding them, he shows them an underground pool. The three have fun, and that afternoon, the girls invite him to a party that is being held the following night. Aron expresses half-hearted interest and says goodbye to the girls, who head home.

He continues through a slot canyon in Bluejohn Canyon. While climbing, an 800-pound (360 kg) boulder from which he is hanging comes loose and causes both to fall, which traps his right arm against the wall. Aron attempts to move the boulder, but it does not budge; he also soon realizes he is alone. He shortly begins recording a video diary using his camcorder to maintain morale as he chips away parts of the boulder with a pocket knife. At one point, the knife falls from his hand, and he is forced to use his bare feet and a little branch to recover it.

Over the next five days, Aron rations his food and remaining 300ml of water, of which he accidentally spills a portion. He struggles to keep warm at night, and is forced to drink his urine when his water runs out. Every morning, he enjoys a brief period of sunlight when the canyon is not in shadow. He also sets up a pulley using his climbing rope in a futile attempt to lift the boulder. Determining that chipping away at the boulder will only make it settle further, he attempts to amputate his arm, but finds that his dull blade can only make shallow cuts. The tool's other implements prove more effective, but are unable to cut through his bones.

Throughout the days, Aron becomes desperate and depressed and begins hallucinating about escape, relationships, and past experiences, including his family and his former girlfriend, Rana. He also imagines going to the party he was invited to and having fun. During one hallucination, Aron realizes his mistake was that he did not tell anyone where he was going or for how long. Aron has a vision of his future son on the sixth day, spurring his will to survive.

Aron fashions a tourniquet from CamelBak tube insulation and uses a carabiner to tighten it. Then, using his knowledge of torque, he breaks the bones in his arm and, using the multi-tool, slowly amputates it. Aron then wraps the stump to prevent exsanguination and takes a picture of the boulder before rappelling down a 65 ft (20 m) rockface. He then finds some rainwater collected while descending down, drinks the stagnant water due to dehydration, and continues. He spots a family on a hike in the desert and calls for help. They give him water and alert the authorities; a Utah Highway Patrol helicopter brings him to a hospital.

Years later, Aron gets married and has a son. He also continues climbing and always leaves a note telling his family where he has gone.

== Cast ==
- James Franco as Aron Ralston
  - Koleman Stinger as Aron Ralston (age 5)
    - Parker Hedley as Aron Ralston (age 15)
- Kate Mara as Kristi Moore
- Amber Tamblyn as Megan McBride
- Clémence Poésy as Rana, Aron's lover
- Lizzy Caplan as Sonja Ralston, Aron's younger sister
  - Bailee Michelle Johnson as Sonja Ralston (age 10)
- Kate Burton as Donna Ralston, Aron's mother
- Treat Williams as Larry Ralston, Aron's father
- Pieter Jan Brugge as Eric Meijer, a Dutch father who gives Aron some water after he hikes out of the canyon

Ralston himself, his wife, and his son make cameo appearances at the end of the film.

== Authenticity ==
The scenes early in the film of Ralston's encounter with the two hikers were altered to portray Ralston showing them a hidden pool, when in reality he just showed them some basic climbing moves. Despite these changes, with which he was initially uncomfortable, Ralston says the rest of the film is "so factually accurate it is as close to a documentary as you can get and still be a drama."

Ralston described himself as having only one arm in his vision of his future child; the film depicts him as still having both arms in the premonition.

Other changes from the book include omissions of descriptions of Ralston's efforts after freeing himself: his bike was chained to itself, not to the tree as depicted at the beginning of the movie; he had to decide where to seek the fastest medical attention; he took a photo of himself at the small brown pool from which he really did drink; he had his first bowel movement of the week; he abandoned many of the items he had kept throughout his confinement; he got lost in a side canyon; and he met a family from the Netherlands (not an American family), Eric, Monique, and Andy Meijer, who already knew that he was probably lost in the area, thanks to the searches of his parents and the authorities. (The actor who plays Eric Meijer, Pieter Jan Brugge, is Dutch.)

Ralston did send Monique and Andy to run ahead to get help, and Ralston did walk seven miles before the helicopter came, although this trek is shown in the film's alternative ending.

== Production ==
Danny Boyle had been wanting to make a film about Ralston's ordeal for four years; he wrote a film treatment and Simon Beaufoy wrote the screenplay. Boyle describes 127 Hours as "an action movie with a guy who can't move." He also expressed an interest for a more intimate film than his previous film, Slumdog Millionaire (2008): "I remember thinking, I must do a film where I follow an actor the way Darren Aronofsky did with The Wrestler. So 127 Hours is my version of that."

Boyle and Fox Searchlight announced plans to create 127 Hours in November 2009. Cillian Murphy was reportedly approached by Boyle to play Ralston. In January 2010, James Franco was cast as Ralston. In March 2010, filming began in Utah; Boyle intended to shoot the first part of the film with no dialogue. By 17 June 2010, the film was in post-production.

Boyle made the very unusual move of hiring two cinematographers to work first unit, Anthony Dod Mantle and Enrique Chediak, each of whom shot 50 percent of the film by trading off with each other. This allowed Boyle and Franco to work long days without wearing out the crew.

Boyle enlisted makeup effects designer Tony Gardner and his effects company, Alterian, Inc., to re-create the character's amputation of his own arm. Boyle stressed that the realism of the arm as well as the process itself were key to the audience's investing in the character's experience, and that the makeup effects' success would impact the film's success. The false arm rigs were created in layers, from fiberglass and steel bone, through silicone and fibrous muscle and tendon, to functional veins and arteries, and finally skinned with a translucent silicone layer of skin with a thin layer of subcutaneous silicone fat. Gardner states that the effects work was extremely stressful, as he wanted to do justice to the story; he credits James Franco equally with the success of the effects work. Three prosthetics were used in all, with two designed to show the innards of the arm and another to emulate the outside of it. Franco would later note that seeing blood on the arm was difficult for him and his reactions in those scenes were genuine.

Franco admitted that shooting the film was physically hard on him: "There was a lot of physical pain, and Danny knew that it was going to cause a lot of pain. And I asked him after we did the movie, 'How did you know how far you could push it?' ... I had plenty of scars...Not only am I feeling physical pain, but I'm getting exhausted. It became less of a façade I put on and more of an experience that I went through."

=== Music ===
The film score was composed by A. R. Rahman who previously collaborated with Boyle on Slumdog Millionaire, the soundtrack album was released on 2 November 2010.

== Release ==
127 Hours was screened at the Toronto International Film Festival on 12 September 2010, following its premiere at the 2010 Telluride Film Festival. The film was selected to close the 2010 London Film Festival on 28 October 2010. It was given a limited release in the United States by Fox Searchlight Pictures on 5 November 2010, followed by wide release on 28 January 2011. It was released in the United Kingdom by Pathé's then-theatrical distributor Warner Bros. Entertainment UK on 7 January 2011, and in India on 26 January 2011.

There were many published reports (not all confirmed) that the trailer and film made audience members ill. The Huffington Post, in November 2010, wrote that it "has gotten audiences fainting, vomiting and worse in numbers unseen since The Exorcist – and the movie has not even hit theaters yet." During the screenings at Telluride Film Festival, two people required medical attention. At the first screening, an audience member became lightheaded and was taken out of the screening on a gurney. During a subsequent screening, another viewer suffered a panic attack. Similar reactions were reported at the Toronto International Film Festival and a special screening hosted by Pixar and Lee Unkrich, director of Toy Story 3 (2010) and Coco (2017). The website Movieline published "Armed and Dangerous: A Comprehensive Timeline of Everyone Who's Fainted (Or Worse) at 127 Hours."

=== Home media ===
20th Century Fox Home Entertainment released 127 Hours on DVD and Blu-ray on March 1, 2011, in the United States and on June 6, 2011, in the United Kingdom under the Pathé label.

== Reception ==
=== Critical response ===
On review aggregation website Rotten Tomatoes, the film has an approval rating of 93% based on 239 critic reviews, with an average rating of 8.2/10. The site's critical consensus reads, "As gut-wrenching as it is inspirational, 127 Hours unites one of Danny Boyle's most beautifully exuberant directorial efforts with a terrific performance from James Franco." On Metacritic, which assigns a weighted average rating to reviews, the film has an average score of 82 out of 100, based on 38 critic reviews, indicating "universal acclaim".

Writing for DVD Talk, Casey Burchby concluded that "127 Hours will stay with you not necessarily as a story of survival, but as a story of a harrowing interior experience". Richard Roeper of The Chicago Sun-Times gave the film four stars, said he believed Franco deserved an Oscar nomination for his performance, and called the film "one of the best of the decade." Roger Ebert also awarded the film four stars out of four and wrote that "127 Hours is like an exercise in conquering the unfilmable". Gazelle Emami wrote for The Huffington Post, describing Franco's performance as "mesmerizing" and "incredible."

=== Top ten lists ===
127 Hours was on many critics' top ten lists for 2010.

- 1st – Claudia Puig, USA Today
- 1st – Chris Vognar, The Dallas Morning News
- 1st – Mike Scott, The New Orleans Times-Picayune
- 1st – Kyle Smith, New York Post
- 2nd – Ann Hornaday, The Washington Post
- 3rd – Gregory Ellwood, HitFix
- 4th – Kirk Honeycutt, The Hollywood Reporter
- 4th – Lou Lumenick, New York Post
- 5th – Betsy Sharkey, Los Angeles Times
- 6th – Christy Lemire, Associated Press
- 6th – Peter Travers, Rolling Stone
- 7th – Bill Goodykoontz, The Arizona Republic
- 7th – Glenn Whipp, MSN
- 7th – Richard Roeper, Chicago Sun-Times
- 7th – A.O. Scott, The New York Times
- 9th – David Germain, Associated Press
- 9th – FX Feeney, The Village Voice
- 10th – Joshua Rothkopf, Time Out New York
- 10th – Owen Gleiberman & Lisa Schwarzbaum, Entertainment Weekly
- Top 10 (listed alphabetically) – Steven Rea, Philadelphia Inquirer
- Top 10 (listed alphabetically) – Joe Williams, St. Louis Post-Dispatch

=== Accolades ===
127 Hours was nominated for three Golden Globe Awards, including Best Actor, Best Screenplay and Best Original Score.

The film was nominated for eight British Academy Film Awards, including Outstanding British Film, Best Direction, Best Actor in a Leading Role, Best Adapted Screenplay, Best Cinematography, Best Editing, and Best Film Music.

The film got six nominations at the 83rd Academy Awards, including Best Picture, Best Actor, Best Adapted Screenplay, Best Original Score, Best Original Song, and Best Film Editing.

It received eight nominations from the Broadcast Film Critics Association, including Best Film, Best Director, Best Actor, Best Adapted Screenplay, Best Cinematography, Best Editing, Best Song, and Best Sound. Its main theme song "If I Rise" won the Critics Choice award for Best Song.

James Franco was awarded Best Actor by the New York Film Critics Online and the Dallas–Fort Worth Film Critics Association.

== See also ==
- Gerry (2002), a film directed by Gus Van Sant, inspired by the death of David Coughlin
