= List of accolades received by True Grit =

True Grit accolades
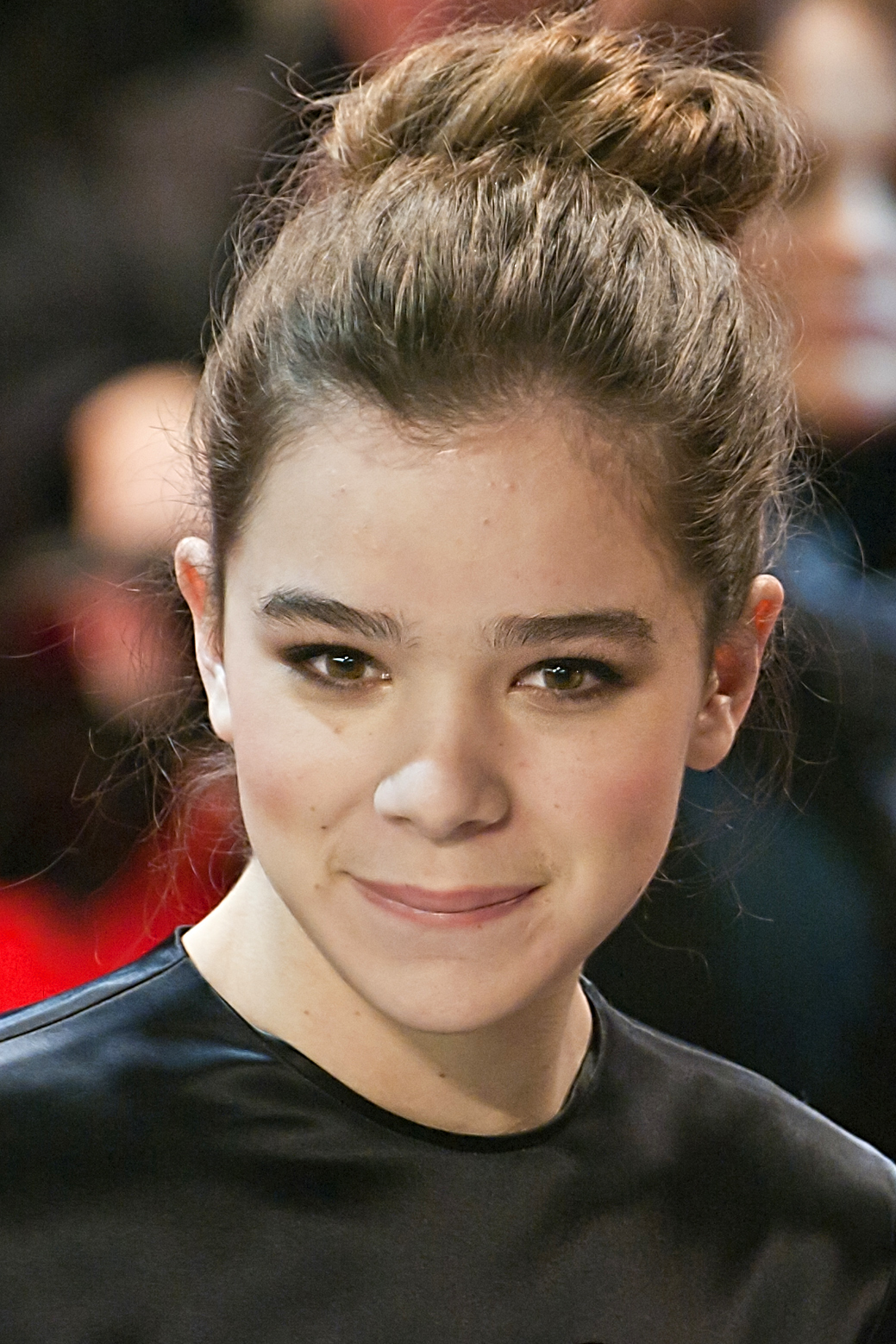
- Hailee Steinfeld received several accolades for her performance as Mattie Ross.
Accolades
Award	Wins	Nominations
AARP Movies for Grownups Awards	0	1
Academy Awards	0	10
Alliance of Women Film Journalists EDA Awards	1	8
American Film Institute Awards	1	1
American Society of Cinematographers Awards	0	1
Art Directors Guild Awards	0	1
Artios Awards	0	1
Austin Film Critics Association Awards	2	2
Bodil Awards	0	1
Boston Society of Film Critics Awards	2	2
British Academy Film Awards	1	8
British Society of Cinematographers Awards	1	1
Chicago Film Critics Association Awards	1	6
Cinema Audio Society Awards	1	1
Costume Designers Guild Awards	0	1
Crime Thriller Awards	1	1
Critics' Choice Movie Awards	1	11
Dallas–Fort Worth Film Critics Association Awards	3	3
Detroit Film Critics Society Awards	0	1
Dublin Film Critics' Circle Awards	5	5
Empire Awards	0	1
Golden Reel Awards	0	2
Hollywood Post Alliance Awards	0	1
Houston Film Critics Society Awards	2	6
International Cinephile Society Awards	1	2
International Film Music Critics Association Awards	0	1
Kansas City Film Critics Circle Awards	1	1
London Film Critics' Circle Awards	0	4
Los Angeles Film Critics Association Awards	1	1
MTV Movie Awards	0	1
National Board of Review Awards	1	1
National Movie Awards	0	3
National Society of Film Critics Awards	1	1
Online Film Critics Society Awards	1	6
Producers Guild of America Awards	0	1
Santa Barbara International Film Festival Awards	1	1
Saturn Awards	0	2
Screen Actors Guild Awards	0	2
St. Louis Film Critics Association Awards	0	3
Toronto Film Critics Association Awards	2	2
USC Scripter Awards	0	1
Vancouver Film Critics Circle Awards	1	4
Washington D.C. Area Film Critics Association Awards	0	7
Western Heritage Awards	1	1
Writers Guild of America Awards	0	1
World Soundtrack Awards	0	1
Young Artist Awards	1	1

Totals (Note: Certain award groups do not simply award one winner. They acknowledge several different recipients, have runners-up, and have third place. Since this is a specific recognition and is different from losing an award, runner-up mentions are considered wins in this award tally. For simplification and to avoid errors, each award in this list has been presumed to have had a prior nomination.)
- Wins: 34
- Nominations: 124

True Grit is a 2010 Western film directed, written and edited by the Coen brothers. It is based on Charles Portis' 1968 novel of the same name, which had previously received an adaptation in 1969 featuring John Wayne. The film stars Jeff Bridges, Josh Brolin, Matt Damon and Hailee Steinfeld. It follows a 14-year old farm girl who seeks retribution against an outlaw (Brolin) for the murder of her father; to this end, she hires a marshal (Bridges), and the duo are joined on their adventure by a Texas Ranger (Damon).

True Grit was released theatrically by Paramount Pictures in the United States and Canada on December 22, 2010. It subsequently opened the 61st Berlin International Film Festival on February 10, 2011, and was released in the United Kingdom on February 11. Releases in additional territories followed throughout February and March. Produced on a budget of $38 million, the film grossed $252 million worldwide during its original theatrical run. True Grit received positive reviews from critics (Note: Attributed to multiple sources:) and is considered one of the best movies of 2010, having appeared on several critic lists of the year's top ten films. On the review aggregator website Rotten Tomatoes, the film holds an approval rating of 95% based on 277 reviews.

True Grit garnered awards and nominations in various categories, with particular recognition for its direction, writing, production design, cinematography, as well as Bridges' and Steinfeld's performances. The film received 10 nominations at the 83rd Academy Awards, including Best Picture, Academy Award for Best Director (Coen brothers), Best Actor (Bridges) and Best Supporting Actress (Steinfeld) but failed to win any awards. It was the first movie to lose all 10 of its nominations since Gangs of New York in 2002. Steinfeld was the 73rd actor to be nominated for an Academy Award for their debut performance and one of the youngest actresses to ever be nominated in the category. At the 64th British Academy Film Awards, it earned eight nominations and won Best Cinematography (Roger Deakins). It received a further 11 nominations at the 16th Critics' Choice Awards, where it won Best Young Actor/Actress (Steinfeld). In addition, True Grit was selected as one of the Top Ten Films of 2010 by both the National Board of Review and the American Film Institute.

== Accolades ==
Accolades received by True Grit
Award	Date of ceremony	Category	Recipient(s)	Result	Ref.
AARP Movies for Grownups Awards	January 14, 2011	Best Screenwriter	Ethan Coen and Joel Coen	Nominated	
Academy Awards	February 27, 2011	Best Picture	Scott Rudin, Ethan Coen and Joel Coen	Nominated	
Academy Awards	February 27, 2011	Best Director	Joel Coen and Ethan Coen	Nominated	
Academy Awards	February 27, 2011	Best Actor	Jeff Bridges	Nominated	
Academy Awards	February 27, 2011	Best Supporting Actress	Hailee Steinfeld	Nominated	
Academy Awards	February 27, 2011	Best Adapted Screenplay	Joel Coen and Ethan Coen	Nominated	
Academy Awards	February 27, 2011	Best Art Direction	Jess Gonchor and Nancy Haigh	Nominated	
Academy Awards	February 27, 2011	Best Cinematography	Roger Deakins	Nominated	
Academy Awards	February 27, 2011	Best Costume Design	Mary Zophres	Nominated	
Academy Awards	February 27, 2011	Best Sound Editing	Skip Lievsay and Craig Berkey	Nominated	
Academy Awards	February 27, 2011	Best Sound Mixing	Skip Lievsay, Craig Berkey, Greg Orloff and Peter Kurland	Nominated	
Alliance of Women Film Journalists EDA Awards	January 10, 2011	Most Beautiful Film	True Grit	Nominated	
Alliance of Women Film Journalists EDA Awards	January 10, 2011	Best Actor	Jeff Bridges	Nominated	
Alliance of Women Film Journalists EDA Awards	January 10, 2011	Best Breakthrough Performance	Hailee Steinfeld	Nominated	
Alliance of Women Film Journalists EDA Awards	January 10, 2011	Best Cinematography	Roger Deakins	Nominated	
Alliance of Women Film Journalists EDA Awards	January 10, 2011	Best Film Music or Score	Carter Burwell	Nominated	
Alliance of Women Film Journalists EDA Awards	January 10, 2011	Best Supporting Actor	Matt Damon	Nominated	
Alliance of Women Film Journalists EDA Awards	January 10, 2011	Best Supporting Actress	Hailee Steinfeld	Won	
Alliance of Women Film Journalists EDA Awards	January 10, 2011	Best Screenplay, Adapted	Ethan Coen and Joel Coen	Nominated	
American Film Institute Awards	December 12, 2010	Top 10 Films of the Year	True Grit	Won (Note: This award does not have a single winner, but recognizes multiple films.)	
American Society of Cinematographers Awards	February 13, 2011	Outstanding Achievement in Cinematography	Roger Deakins	Nominated	
Art Directors Guild Awards	February 5, 2011	Excellence in Production Design for a Period Film	Jess Gonchor	Nominated	
Artios Awards	September 27, 2011	Big Budget Feature – Drama	Ellen Chenoweth, Rachel Tenner and JoEdna Boldin	Nominated	
Austin Film Critics Association Awards	December 22, 2010	Best Supporting Actress	Hailee Steinfeld	Won	
Austin Film Critics Association Awards	December 22, 2010	Top 10 Films	True Grit	6th Place	
Bodil Awards	March 3, 2012	Best American Film	True Grit	Nominated	
Boston Society of Film Critics Awards	December 12, 2010	Best Cinematography	Roger Deakins	Won	
Boston Society of Film Critics Awards	December 12, 2010	Best Use of Music in a Film	Carter Burwell	Runner-up	
British Academy Film Awards	February 13, 2011	Best Actor	Jeff Bridges	Nominated	
British Academy Film Awards	February 13, 2011	Best Adapted Screenplay	Ethan Coen and Joel Coen	Nominated	
British Academy Film Awards	February 13, 2011	Best Actress	Hailee Steinfeld	Nominated	
British Academy Film Awards	February 13, 2011	Best Cinematography	Roger Deakins	Won	
British Academy Film Awards	February 13, 2011	Best Costume Design	Mary Zophres	Nominated	
British Academy Film Awards	February 13, 2011	Best Film	Scott Rudin, Ethan Coen and Joel Coen	Nominated	
British Academy Film Awards	February 13, 2011	Best Production Design	Jess Gonchor and Nancy Haigh	Nominated	
British Academy Film Awards	February 13, 2011	Best Sound	Craig Berkey, Greg Orloff, Douglas Axtell, Skip Lievsay and Peter Kurland	Nominated	
British Society of Cinematographers Awards	February 16, 2010	Best Cinematography in a Theatrical Feature Film	Roger Deakins	Won	
Costume Designers Guild Awards	February 22, 2011	Excellence in Period Film	Mary Zophres	Nominated	
Crime Thriller Awards	October 8, 2011	Film of the Year	True Grit	Won	
Critics' Choice Movie Awards	January 14, 2011	Best Picture	True Grit	Nominated	
Critics' Choice Movie Awards	January 14, 2011	Best Actor	Jeff Bridges	Nominated	
Critics' Choice Movie Awards	January 14, 2011	Best Supporting Actress	Hailee Steinfeld	Nominated	
Critics' Choice Movie Awards	January 14, 2011	Best Adapted Screenplay	Ethan Coen and Joel Coen	Nominated	
Critics' Choice Movie Awards	January 14, 2011	Best Art Direction	Jess Gonchor and Nancy Haigh	Nominated	
Critics' Choice Movie Awards	January 14, 2011	Best Cinematography	Roger Deakins	Nominated	
Critics' Choice Movie Awards	January 14, 2011	Best Costume Design	Mary Zophres	Nominated	
Critics' Choice Movie Awards	January 14, 2011	Best Director	Ethan Coen and Joel Coen	Nominated	
Critics' Choice Movie Awards	January 14, 2011	Best Makeup	True Grit	Nominated	
Critics' Choice Movie Awards	January 14, 2011	Best Score	Carter Burwell	Nominated	
Critics' Choice Movie Awards	January 14, 2011	Best Young Actor/Actress	Hailee Steinfeld	Won	
Chicago Film Critics Association Awards	December 20, 2010	Best Actor	Jeff Bridges	Nominated	
Chicago Film Critics Association Awards	December 20, 2010	Best Supporting Actress	Hailee Steinfeld	Won	
Chicago Film Critics Association Awards	December 20, 2010	Best Adapted Screenplay	Ethan Coen and Joel Coen	Nominated	
Chicago Film Critics Association Awards	December 20, 2010	Best Cinematography	Roger Deakins	Nominated	
Chicago Film Critics Association Awards	December 20, 2010	Best Original Score	Carter Burwell	Nominated	
Chicago Film Critics Association Awards	December 20, 2010	Most Promising Performer	Hailee Steinfeld	Nominated	
Cinema Audio Society Awards	February 19, 2011	Outstanding Achievement in Sound Mixing for a Motion Picture	Peter Kurland, Skip Lievsay, Craig Berkey and Greg Orloff	Won	
Dallas-Fort Worth Film Critics Association Awards	December 17, 2010	Best Cinematography	Roger Deakins	Runner-up (Note: Tied with Wally Pfister for Inception)	
Dallas-Fort Worth Film Critics Association Awards	December 17, 2010	Best Supporting Actress	Hailee Steinfeld	4th Place	
Dallas-Fort Worth Film Critics Association Awards	December 17, 2010	Top 10 Films	True Grit	8th Place	
Detroit Film Critics Society Awards	December 11, 2010	Best Actor	Jeff Bridges	Nominated	
Dublin Film Critics' Circle Awards	December 23, 2011	Best Film	True Grit	8th Place	
Dublin Film Critics' Circle Awards	December 23, 2011	Best Director	Ethan Coen and Joel Coen	8th Place	
Dublin Film Critics' Circle Awards	December 23, 2011	Best Actress	Hailee Steinfeld	7th Place	
Dublin Film Critics' Circle Awards	December 23, 2011	Breakthrough	Hailee Steinfeld	4th Place	
Dublin Film Critics' Circle Awards	December 23, 2011	Best Actor	Jeff Bridges	8th Place	
Empire Awards	March 25, 2012	Best Female Newcomer	Hailee Steinfeld	Nominated	
Golden Reel Awards	February 20, 2011	Best Sound Editing in Feature Film – Dialogue & ADR	Skip Lievsay, Byron Wilson, Kenton Jakub and Katy Wood	Nominated	
Golden Reel Awards	February 20, 2011	Best Sound Editing in Feature Film – Sound Effects & Foley	Skip Lievsay, Craig Berkey, Joel Dougherty, Jay Wilkinson, Bob Beher and Marko Costanzo	Nominated	
Hollywood Post Alliance Awards	November 10, 2011	Outstanding Sound – Feature Film	Skip Lievsay, Craig Berkey and Greg Orloff	Nominated	
Houston Film Critics Society Awards	December 18, 2010	Best Picture	True Grit	Nominated	
Houston Film Critics Society Awards	December 18, 2010	Best Director	Ethan Coen and Joel Coen	Nominated	
Houston Film Critics Society Awards	December 18, 2010	Best Actor	Jeff Bridges	Nominated	
Houston Film Critics Society Awards	December 18, 2010	Best Supporting Actress	Hailee Steinfeld	Won	
Houston Film Critics Society Awards	December 18, 2010	Best Original Score	Carter Burwell	Nominated	
Houston Film Critics Society Awards	December 18, 2010	Best Cinematography	Roger Deakins	Nominated	
International Cinephile Society Awards	February 20, 2011	Best Adapted Screenplay	Ethan Coen, Joel Coen and Charles Portis	Nominated	
International Cinephile Society Awards	February 20, 2011	Best Cinematography	Roger Deakins	Runner-up	
International Film Music Critics Association Awards	February 24, 2011	Best Original Score for a Drama Film	Carter Burwell	Nominated	
Kansas City Film Critics Circle Awards	January 2, 2011	Best Supporting Actress	Hailee Steinfeld	Won	
London Film Critics' Circle Awards	February 10, 2011	Actor of the Year	Jeff Bridges	Nominated	
London Film Critics' Circle Awards	February 10, 2011	Director of the Year	Ethan Coen and Joel Coen	Nominated	
London Film Critics' Circle Awards	February 10, 2011	Actress of the Year	Hailee Steinfeld	Nominated	
London Film Critics' Circle Awards	February 10, 2011	Screenwriter of the Year	Ethan Coen and Joel Coen	Nominated	
Los Angeles Film Critics Association Awards	December 12, 2010	Best Cinematography	Roger Deakins	Runner-up	
MTV Movie Awards	June 5, 2011	Best Breakthrough Performance	Hailee Steinfeld	Nominated	
National Board of Review Awards	December 2, 2010	Top Ten Films	True Grit	Won	
National Movie Awards	May 11, 2011	Best Drama	True Grit	Nominated	
National Movie Awards	May 11, 2011	Performance of the Year	Hailee Steinfeld	Nominated	
National Movie Awards	May 11, 2011	Performance of the Year	Jeff Bridges	Nominated (Note: Also for Tron: Legacy)	
National Society of Film Critics Awards	January 8, 2011	Best Cinematography	Roger Deakins	Won	
Online Film Critics Society	January 3, 2011	Best Director	Ethan Coen and Joel Coen	Nominated	
Online Film Critics Society	January 3, 2011	Best Cinematography	Roger Deakins	Nominated	
Online Film Critics Society	January 3, 2011	Best Adapted Screenplay	Ethan Coen and Joel Coen	Nominated	
Online Film Critics Society	January 3, 2011	Best Lead Actor	Jeff Bridges	Nominated	
Online Film Critics Society	January 3, 2011	Best Picture	True Grit	Nominated	
Online Film Critics Society	January 3, 2011	Best Supporting Actress	Hailee Steinfeld	Won	
Producers Guild of America Awards	January 22, 2011	Best Theatrical Motion Picture	Scott Rudin, Ethan Coen and Joel Coen	Nominated	
Santa Barbara International Film Festival Awards	January 27, 2011	Virtuosos Award	Hailee Steinfeld	Won (Note: Also awarded to Andrew Garfield, John Hawkes, Lesley Manville and Jacki Weaver)	
Saturn Awards	June 23, 2011	Best Action/Adventure Film	True Grit	Nominated	
Saturn Awards	June 23, 2011	Best Performance by a Younger Actor	Hailee Steinfeld	Nominated	
Screen Actors Guild Awards	January 30, 2011	Outstanding Female Actor in a Supporting Role	Hailee Steinfeld	Nominated	
Screen Actors Guild Awards	January 30, 2011	Outstanding Male Actor in a Leading Role	Jeff Bridges	Nominated	
St. Louis Film Critics Association Awards	December 20, 2010	Best Actor	Jeff Bridges	Nominated	
St. Louis Film Critics Association Awards	December 20, 2010	Best Adapted Screenplay	Ethan Coen and Joel Coen	Nominated	
St. Louis Film Critics Association Awards	December 20, 2010	Best Supporting Actress	Hailee Steinfeld	Nominated	
Toronto Film Critics Association Awards	December 14, 2010	Best Supporting Actress	Hailee Steinfeld	Won	
Toronto Film Critics Association Awards	December 14, 2010	Best Screenplay	Ethan Coen and Joel Coen	Runner-up (Note: Tied with The King's Speech)	
University of Southern California	February 4, 2011	USC Scripter Awards	Ethan Coen and Joel Coen	Nominated	
Vancouver Film Critics Circle Awards	January 11, 2011	Best Film	True Grit	Nominated	
Vancouver Film Critics Circle Awards	January 11, 2011	Best Director	Ethan Coen and Joel Coen	Nominated	
Vancouver Film Critics Circle Awards	January 11, 2011	Best Supporting Actress	Hailee Steinfeld	Won	
Vancouver Film Critics Circle Awards	January 11, 2011	Best Screenplay	Ethan Coen and Joel Coen	Nominated	
Washington D.C. Area Film Critics Association Awards	December 6, 2010	Best Actor	Jeff Bridges	Nominated	
Washington D.C. Area Film Critics Association Awards	December 6, 2010	Best Adapted Screenplay	Ethan Coen and Joel Coen	Nominated	
Washington D.C. Area Film Critics Association Awards	December 6, 2010	Best Art Direction	True Grit	Nominated	
Washington D.C. Area Film Critics Association Awards	December 6, 2010	Best Cinematography	Roger Deakins	Nominated	
Washington D.C. Area Film Critics Association Awards	December 6, 2010	Best Director	Ethan Coen and Joel Coen	Nominated	
Washington D.C. Area Film Critics Association Awards	December 6, 2010	Best Score	Carter Burwell	Nominated	
Washington D.C. Area Film Critics Association Awards	December 6, 2010	Best Supporting Actress	Hailee Steinfeld	Nominated	
Western Heritage Awards	April 16, 2011	Bronze Wrangler – Theatrical Motion Picture	True Grit	Won	
Writers Guild of America Awards	February 5, 2011	Best Adapted Screenplay	Ethan Coen and Joel Coen	Nominated	
World Soundtrack Awards	October 22, 2011	Best Original Score of the Year	Carter Burwell	Nominated	
Young Artist Awards	March 13, 2011	Best Performance in a Feature Film – Leading Young Actress	Hailee Steinfeld	Won	
