= List of 2010 box office number-one films in Canada =

This is a list of films which have placed number one at the weekend box office in Canada during 2010.

== Weekend gross list ==
†	This implies the highest-grossing movie of the year.

#	Weekend End Date	Film	Weekend Gross (millions)	Notes
1	January 3, 2010	Avatar	$6.41	
2	January 10, 2010	Avatar	$5.65	
3	January 17, 2010	Avatar	$5.10	
4	January 24, 2010	Avatar	$4.50	
5	January 31, 2010	Avatar	$4.25	
6	February 7, 2010	Avatar	$3.47	Dear John was #1 in North America.
7	February 14, 2010	Valentine's Day	$4.04	
8	February 21, 2010	Shutter Island	$2.99	
9	February 28, 2010	Shutter Island	$1.83	
10	March 7, 2010	Alice in Wonderland †	$8.63	
11	March 14, 2010	Alice in Wonderland †	$6.14	
12	March 21, 2010	Alice in Wonderland †	$4.32	
13	March 28, 2010	How to Train Your Dragon	$3.43	
14	April 4, 2010	Clash of the Titans	$5.25	
15	April 11, 2010	Clash of the Titans	$2.54	
16	April 18, 2010	How to Train Your Dragon	$1.92	How to Train Your Dragon reclaimed #1 in its fourth weekend of release. Kick-Ass was #1 in North America.
17	April 25, 2010	How to Train Your Dragon	$1.45	
18	May 2, 2010	A Nightmare on Elm Street	$1.86	
19	May 9, 2010	Iron Man 2	$9.62	
20	May 16, 2010	Iron Man 2	$4.59	
21	May 23, 2010	Shrek Forever After	$5.86	
22	May 30, 2010	Shrek Forever After	$4.02	
23	June 6, 2010	Shrek Forever After	$3.31	
24	June 13, 2010	The Karate Kid	$3.58	
25	June 20, 2010	Toy Story 3	$5.63	
26	June 27, 2010	Toy Story 3	$4.50	
27	July 4, 2010	The Twilight Saga: Eclipse	$5.27	
28	July 11, 2010	Despicable Me	$3.01	
29	July 18, 2010	Inception	$4.70	
30	July 25, 2010	Inception	$3.80	
31	August 1, 2010	Inception	$2.80	
32	August 8, 2010	The Other Guys	$2.57	
33	August 15, 2010	The Expendables	$2.97	
34	August 22, 2010	The Expendables	$2.03	
35	August 29, 2010	The Last Exorcism	$1.21	Takers was #1 in North America.
36	September 5, 2010	The American	$1.33	
37	September 12, 2010	Resident Evil: Afterlife	$2.56	
38	September 19, 2010	Easy A	$1.97	The Town was #1 in North America.
39	September 26, 2010	The Town	$1.48	Wall Street: Money Never Sleeps was #1 in North America. The Town reached #1 in its second weekend of release.
40	October 3, 2010	The Social Network	$2.22	
41	October 10, 2010	The Social Network	$1.74	
42	October 17, 2010	Jackass 3D	$3.85	
43	October 24, 2010	Paranormal Activity 2	$2.46	
44	October 31, 2010	Saw 3D	$1.80	
45	November 7, 2010	Megamind	$3.41	
46	November 14, 2010	Megamind	$2.82	
47	November 21, 2010	Harry Potter and the Deathly Hallows: Part 1	$10.24	Harry Potter and the Deathly Hallows: Part 1 had the highest weekend debut of 2010 in Canada.
48	November 28, 2010	Harry Potter and the Deathly Hallows: Part 1	$4.78	
49	December 5, 2010	Harry Potter and the Deathly Hallows: Part 1	$2.63	Tangled was #1 in North America.
50	December 12, 2010	The Chronicles of Narnia: The Voyage of the Dawn Treader	$1.73	
51	December 19, 2010	Tron: Legacy	$2.98	
52	December 26, 2010	Little Fockers	$1.47	
53	January 2, 2011	Little Fockers	$1.56	

== Highest-grossing films in Canada ==
Highest-grossing films of 2010 As of December 27, 2010
Rank	Title	Studio	Total Gross (in millions)	Notes
1	Alice in Wonderland	Disney	$36.71	
2	Inception	Warner Bros.	$33.44	
3	Toy Story 3	Disney/Pixar	$33.13	
4	Iron Man 2	Paramount	$27.97	
5	Harry Potter and the Deathly Hallows: Part 1	Warner Bros.	$27.22	
6	The Twilight Saga: Eclipse	Summit	$26.73	
7	Shrek Forever After	Paramount/DreamWorks	$23.41	
8	Despicable Me	Universal	$21.89	
9	How To Train Your Dragon	Paramount/DreamWorks	$20.58	
10	Clash of the Titans	Warner Bros.	$15.99	
11	Grown Ups	Columbia	$15.30	
12	The Karate Kid	Columbia	$14.51	
13	Shutter Island	Paramount	$14.00	
14	Salt	Columbia	$13.86	
15	Robin Hood	Columbia	$13.13	
16	The Expendables	Liongates	$13.04	
17	Megamind	Paramount/DreamWorks	$12.44	
18	Jackass 3D	Paramount	$12.32	
19	Tangled	Disney	$11.36	
20	The Other Guys	Columbia	$11.25	
21	The Social Network	Columbia	$11.04	
22	Sex and the City 2	New Line Cinema	$10.51	
23	Prince of Persia: The Sands of Time	Disney	$9.95	
24	Due Date	Warner Bros.	$9.84	
25	The Town	Legendary	$9.65	

== See also ==
- List of Canadian films – Canadian films by year
