= 2010 National Society of Film Critics Awards =

Annual US film awards ceremony

45th NSFC Awards

January 8, 2011

Best Film:
The Social Network

The 45th National Society of Film Critics Awards, given on 8 January 2011, honored the best in film for 2010.

== Winners ==
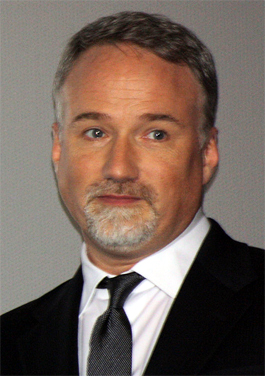
David Fincher, Best Director winner

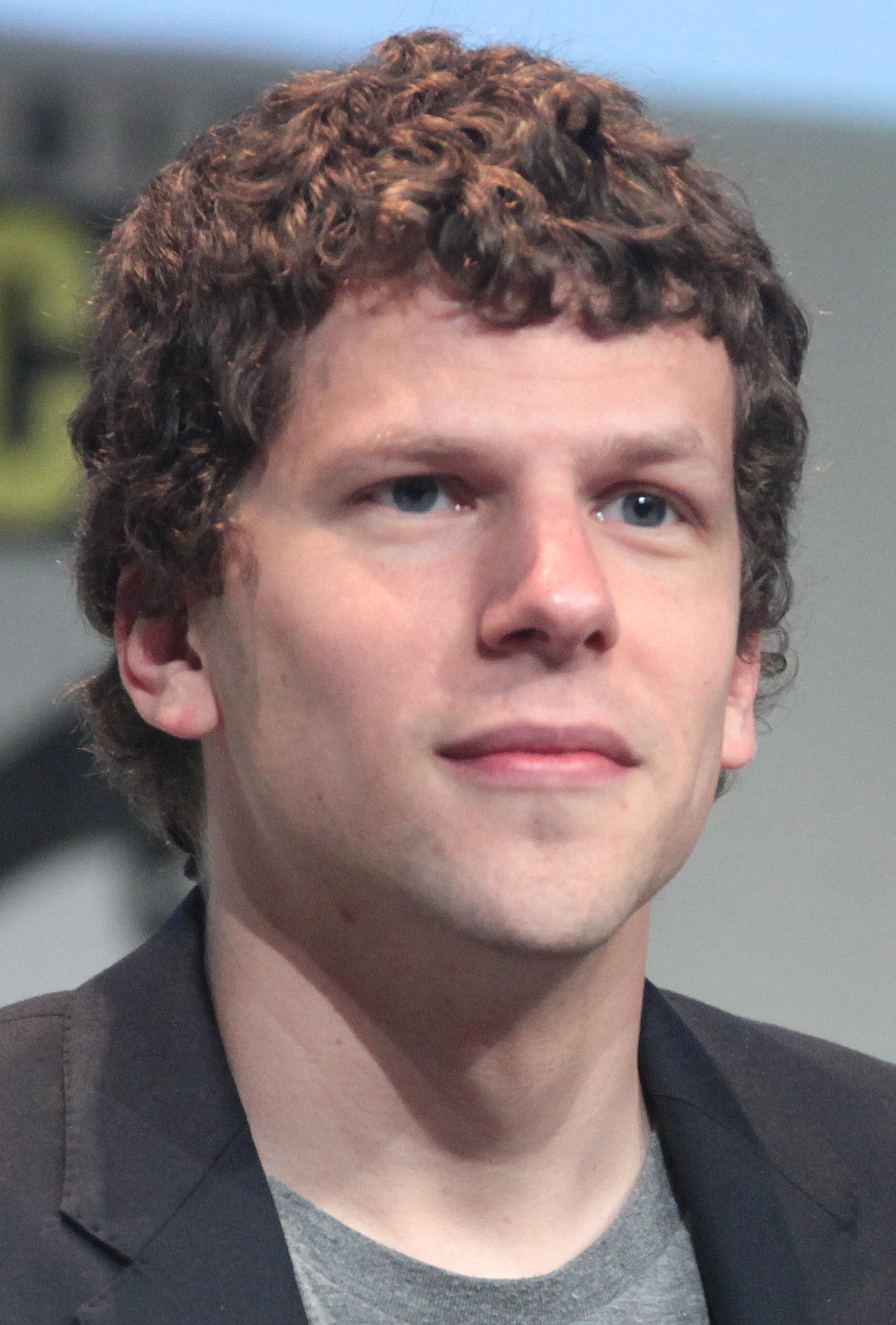
Jesse Eisenberg, Best Actor winner

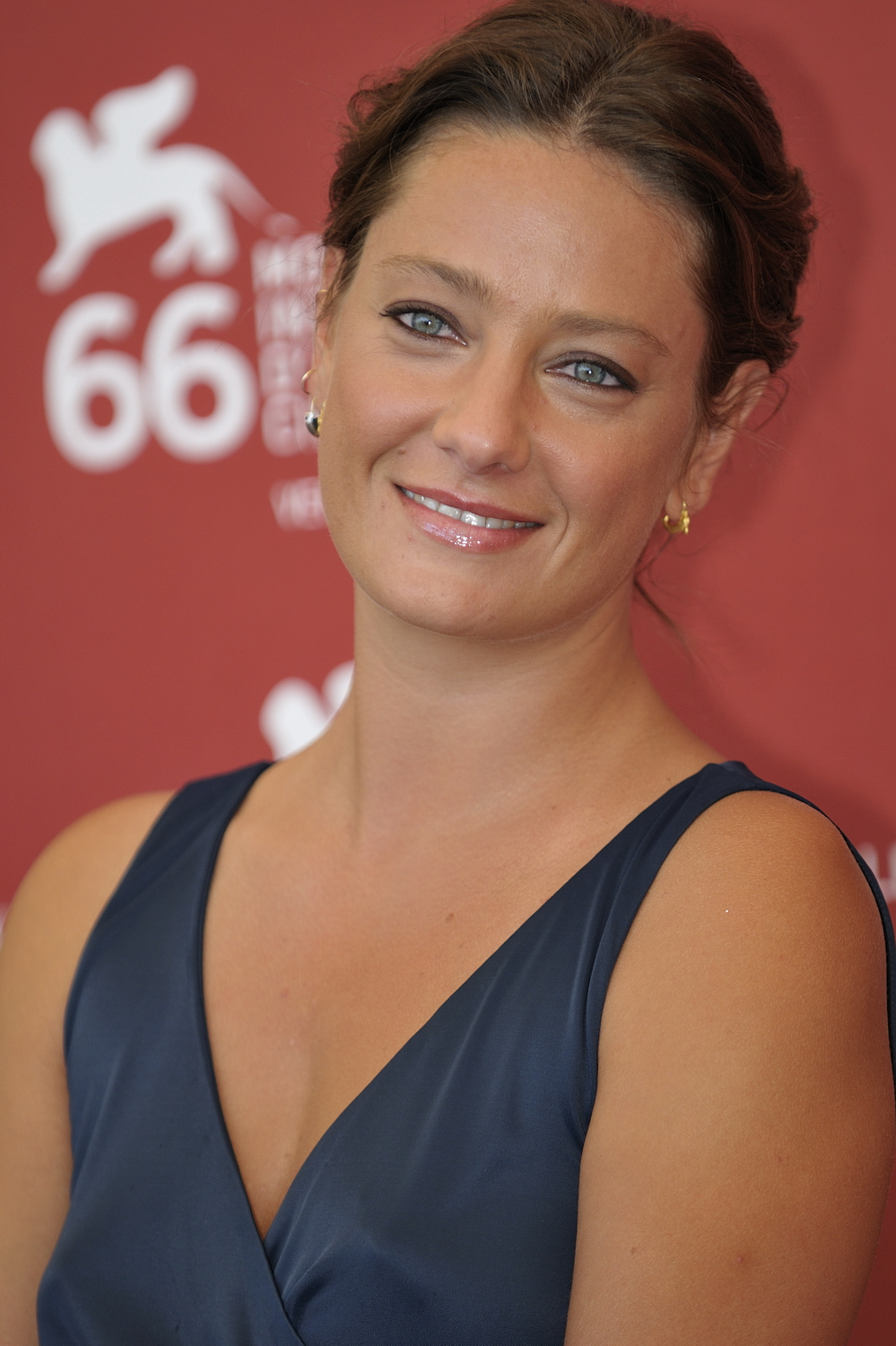
Giovanna Mezzogiorno, Best Actress winner

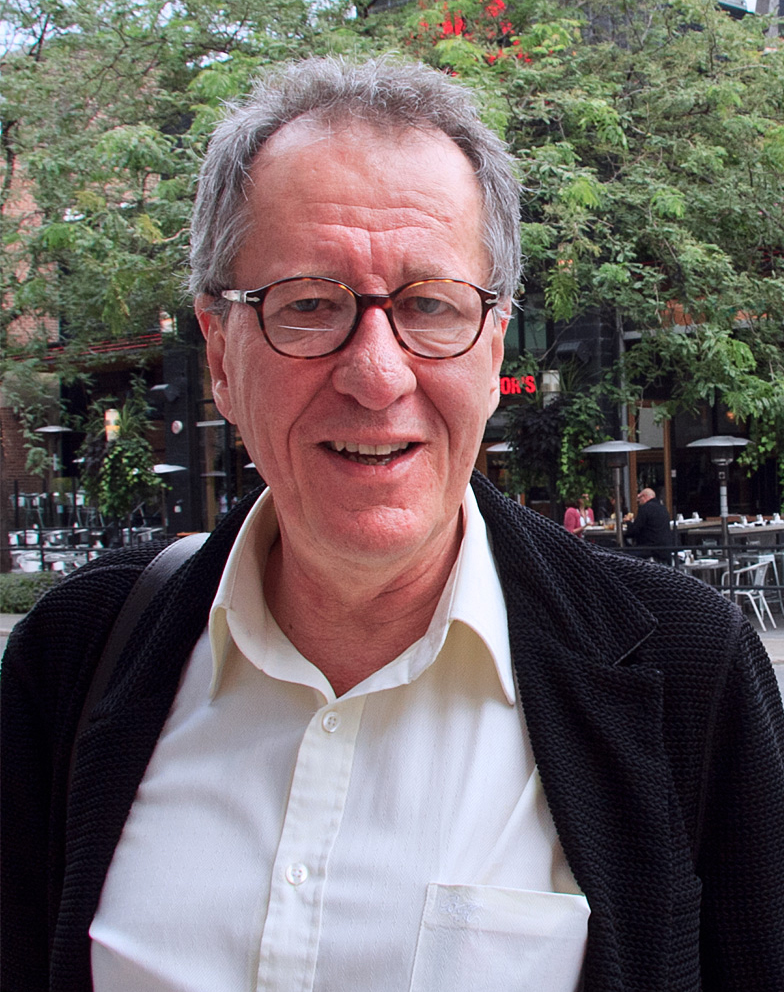
Geoffrey Rush, Best Supporting Actor winner

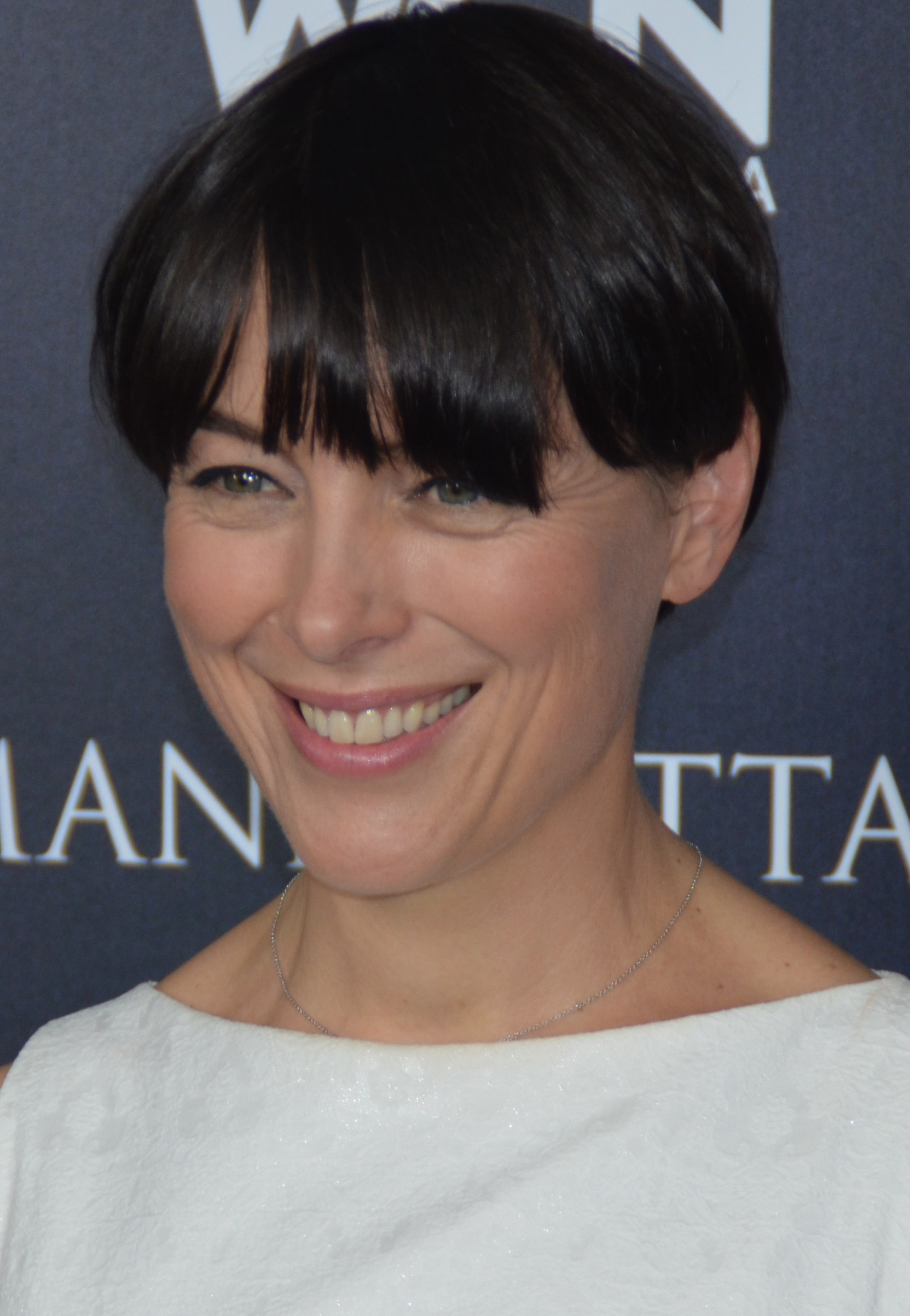
Olivia Williams, Best Supporting Actress winner

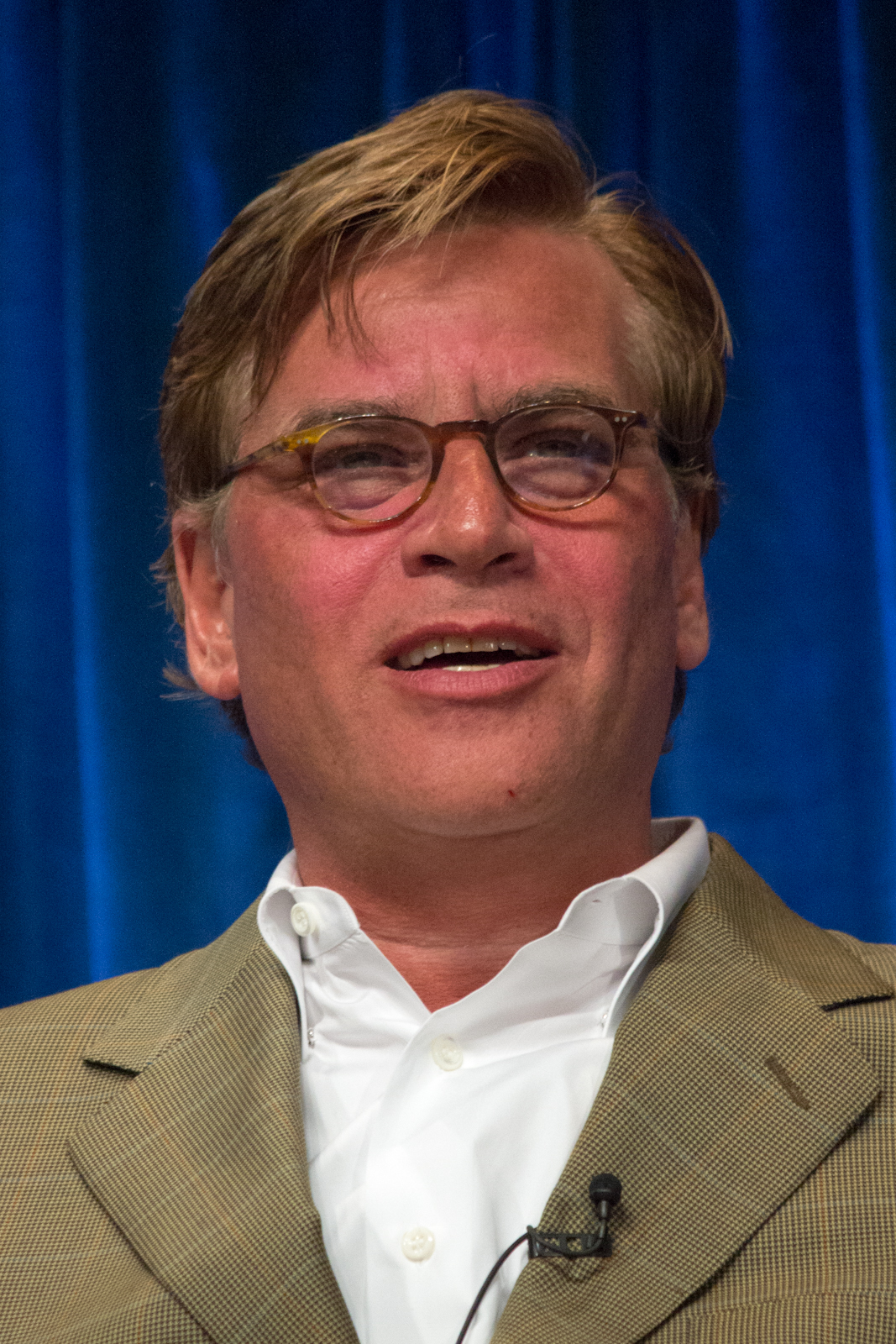
Aaron Sorkin, Best Screenplay winner

Winners are listed in boldface along with the runner-up positions and counts from the final round:

=== Best Picture ===
1. The Social Network (61)
2. Carlos (28)
3. Winter's Bone (18)

=== Best Director ===
1. David Fincher – The Social Network (66)
2. Olivier Assayas – Carlos (36)
3. Roman Polanski – The Ghost Writer (29)

=== Best Actor ===
1. Jesse Eisenberg – The Social Network (30)
2. Colin Firth – The King's Speech (29)
2. Édgar Ramírez – Carlos (29)

=== Best Actress ===
1. Giovanna Mezzogiorno – Vincere (33)
2. Annette Bening – The Kids Are All Right (28)
3. Lesley Manville – Another Year (27)

=== Best Supporting Actor ===
1. Geoffrey Rush – The King's Speech (33)
2. Christian Bale – The Fighter (32)
3. Jeremy Renner – The Town (30)

=== Best Supporting Actress ===
1. Olivia Williams – The Ghost Writer (37)
2. Amy Adams – The Fighter (28)
3. Melissa Leo – The Fighter (23)
3. Jacki Weaver – Animal Kingdom (23)

=== Best Screenplay ===
1. Aaron Sorkin – The Social Network (73)
2. David Seidler – The King's Speech (25)
3. Roman Polanski and Robert Harris – The Ghost Writer (19)

=== Best Cinematography ===
1. Roger Deakins – True Grit (31)
2. Matthew Libatique – Black Swan (27)
3. Harris Savides – Somewhere (18)

=== Best Foreign Language Film ===
1. Carlos (31)
2. A Prophet (22)
3. White Material (16)

=== Best Non-Fiction Film ===
1. Charles Ferguson – Inside Job (25)
2. Banksy – Exit Through the Gift Shop (21)
3. Lixin Fan – Last Train Home (Guītú Lièchē) (15)

=== Film Heritage Awards ===
1. Flicker Alley for Chaplin at Keystone
2. Twentieth Century Fox Home Entertainment for The Elia Kazan Collection
3. The Film Foundation (for twenty years of providing financial support and moral leadership for the preservation and restoration of motion pictures from around the world)
4. Upstream, a rediscovered 1927 backstage comedy film directed by John Ford (discovered in the collection of the New Zealand Film Archive and repatriated under the auspices of the National Film Preservation Foundation with the collaboration of the Academy Film Archive, Park Road Post Production, and Twentieth Century Fox)
5. On the Bowery (restored by Davide Pozzi of the Cineteca del Comune di Bologna in cooperation with the Rogosin Heritage and Anthology Film Archives, and distributed in the U.S. by Milestone Films)
6. Word Is Out: Stories of Some of Our Lives (restored by Ross Lipman for the UCLA Film & Television Archive and the Outfest Legacy Project, and distributed by Milestone Films)
