= Dallas–Fort Worth Film Critics Association Awards 2010 =

Annual US film awards ceremony

16th Dallas–Fort Worth Film Critics Association Awards
- Date: December 17, 2010
- Location: Dallas, Texas
- Country: United States
- Presented by: Dallas–Fort Worth Film Critics Association
- Website: dfwfilmcritics.net

The 16th Dallas–Fort Worth Film Critics Association Awards honoring the best in film for 2010 were announced on December 17, 2010. These awards "recognizing extraordinary accomplishment in film" are presented annually by the Dallas–Fort Worth Film Critics Association (DFWFCA), based in the Dallas–Fort Worth metroplex region of Texas. The organization, founded in 1990, includes 28 film critics for print, radio, television, and internet publications based in north Texas. The Dallas–Fort Worth Film Critics Association began presenting its annual awards list in 1991.

The Social Network was the DFWFCA's most awarded film of 2010 taking top honors in the Best Picture, Best Director (David Fincher), and Best Screenplay (Aaron Sorkin) categories. This continued a trend of critics groups across the United States giving their top prizes to the film about the founding of Facebook.

Two films each took two top prizes: 127 Hours garnered a Best Actor nod for James Franco as real-life mountain climber Aron Ralston plus Anthony Dod Mantle and Enrique Chediak for Best Cinematography. The Fighter earned Christian Bale the Best Supporting Actor honor for his performance as real-life boxer Dicky Eklund and Melissa Leo the Best Supporting Actress award for her portrayal of Dicky's mother, Alice Eklund.

The other acting award went to Natalie Portman as Best Actress for her leading role in Black Swan. The remaining film honors went to Toy Story 3 as Best Animated Film, Waiting for "Superman" as Best Documentary, and Mexico's Biutiful as Best Foreign Language Film.

Along with the 11 "best of" category awards, the group also presented the Russell Smith Award to Winter's Bone as the "best low-budget or cutting-edge independent film" of the year. The award is named in honor of late Dallas Morning News film critic Russell Smith.

== Winners ==
Winners are listed first and highlighted with boldface. Other films ranked by the annual poll are listed in order. While most categories saw 5 honorees named, some categories ranged from as many as 10 (Best Film) to as few as 2 (Best Cinematography, Best Animated Film, Best Screenplay).

=== Category awards ===
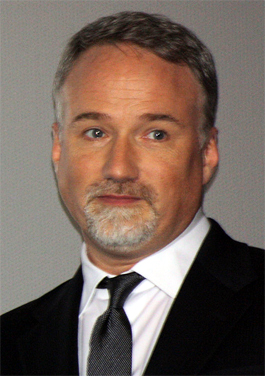
David Fincher, Best Director winner

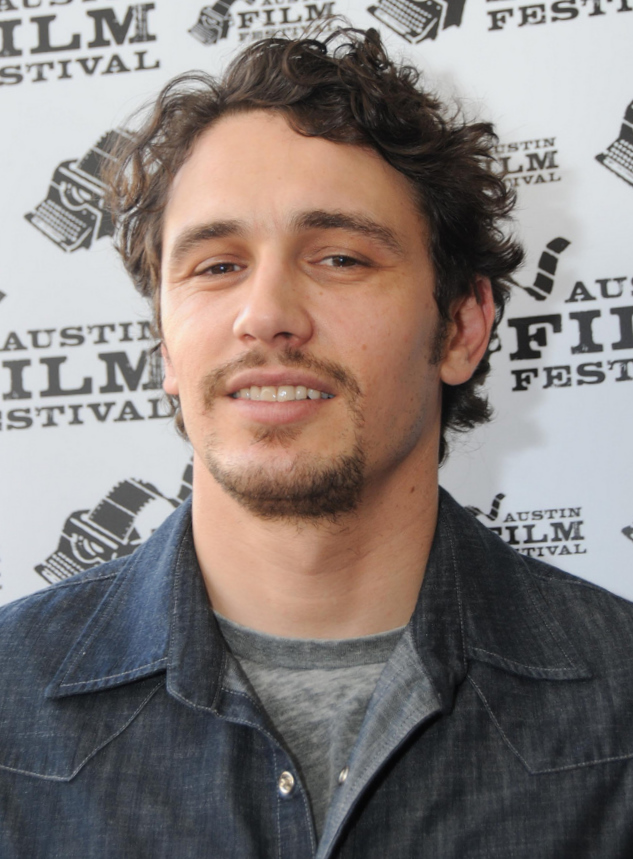
James Franco, Best Actor winner

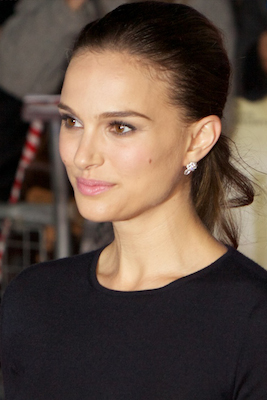
Natalie Portman, Best Actress winner

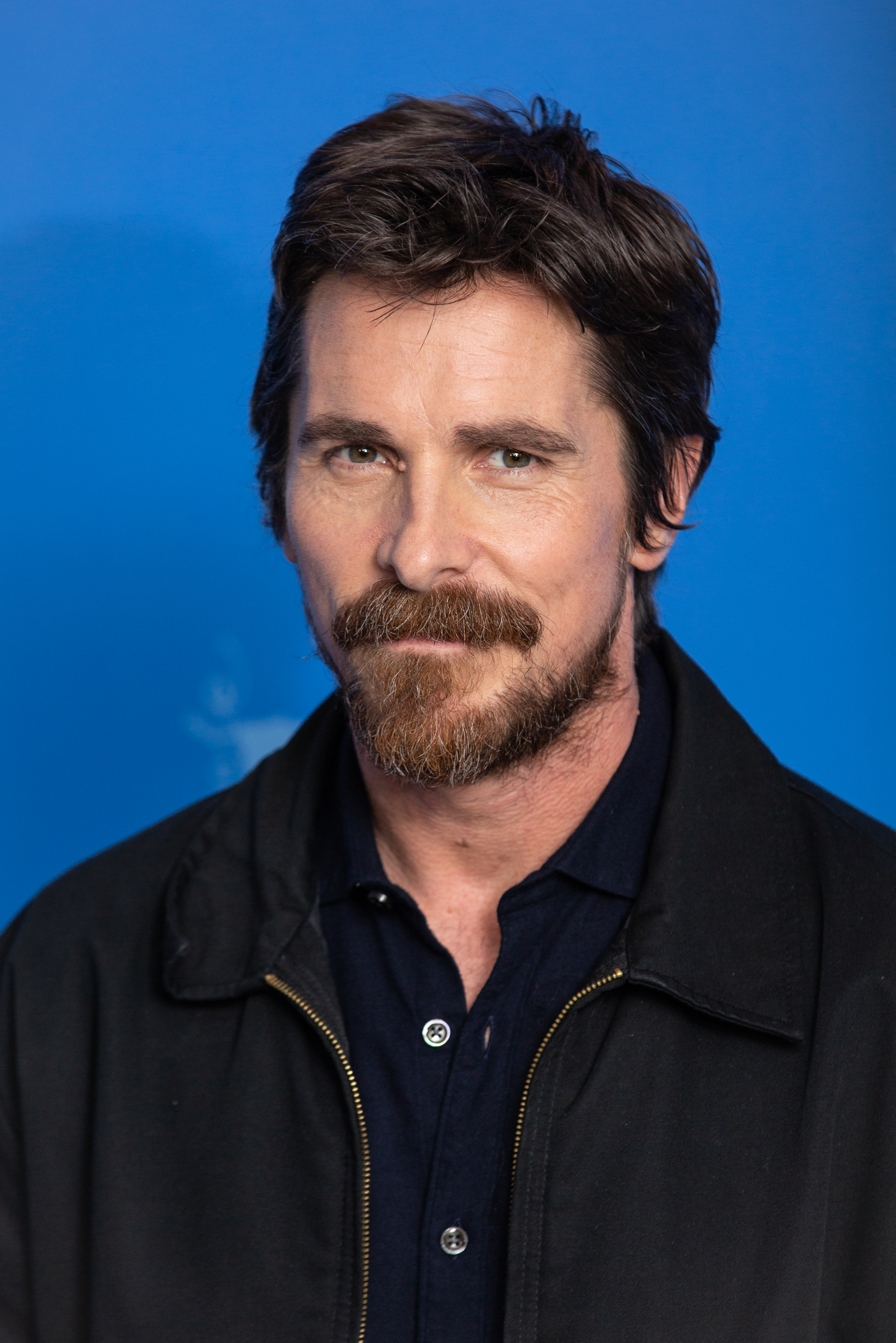
Christian Bale, Best Supporting Actor winner

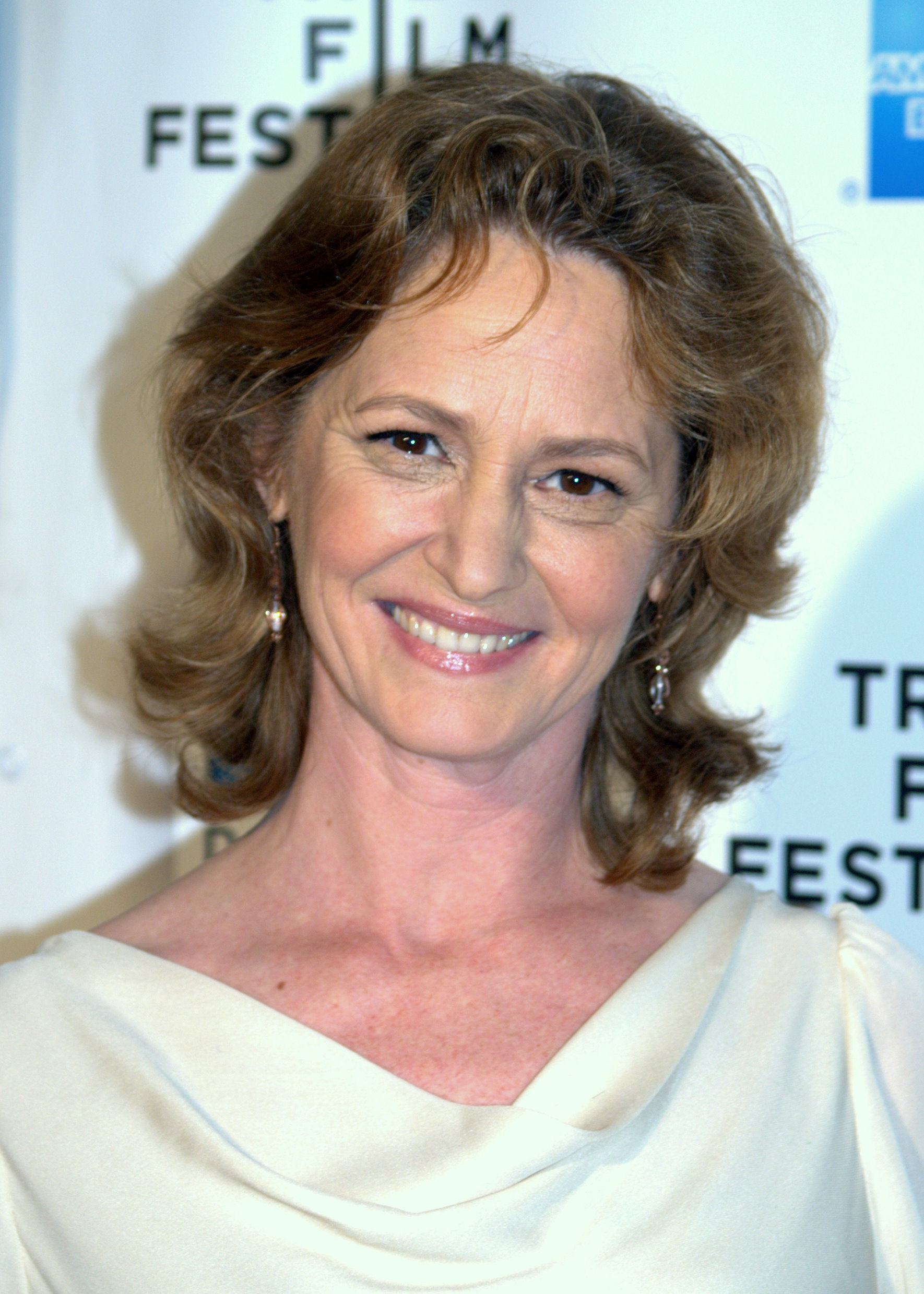
Melissa Leo, Best Supporting Actress winner

Best Picture	Best Foreign Language Film
1. **The Social Network**; 2. The King's Speech; 3. Black Swan; 4. 127 Hours; 5. Winter's Bone; 6. Inception; 7. The Fighter; 8. True Grit; 9. The Town; 10. The Kids Are All Right	1. **Biutiful** • Mexico; 2. The Girl with the Dragon Tattoo • Sweden; 3. Mother • South Korea; 4. Lebanon • Israel; 5. I Am Love • Italy
Best Actor	Best Actress
1. **James Franco** - 127 Hours as Aron Ralston; 2. Colin Firth - The King's Speech as King George VI; 3. Jesse Eisenberg - The Social Network as Mark Zuckerberg; 4. Robert Duvall - Get Low as Felix Bush; 5. Michael Douglas - Solitary Man as Ben Kalmen	1. **Natalie Portman** - Black Swan as Nina Sayers / The Swan Queen; 2. Jennifer Lawrence - Winter's Bone as Ree Dolly; 3. Nicole Kidman - Rabbit Hole as Becca Corbett; 4. Annette Bening - The Kids Are All Right as Dr. Nicole "Nic" Allgood; 5. Michelle Williams - Blue Valentine as Cindy Heller
Best Supporting Actor	Best Supporting Actress
1. **Christian Bale** - The Fighter as Dicky Eklund; 2. Geoffrey Rush - The King's Speech as Lionel Logue; 3. Jeremy Renner - The Town as James "Jem" Coughlin; 4. Bill Murray - Get Low as Frank Quinn; 5. Chris Cooper - The Company Men as Phil Woodward	1. **Melissa Leo** - The Fighter as Alice Eklund; 2. Jacki Weaver - Animal Kingdom as Janine "Smurf" Cody; 3. Helena Bonham Carter - The King's Speech as Queen Elizabeth; 4. Hailee Steinfeld - True Grit as Mattie Ross; 5. Mila Kunis - Black Swan as Lily / The Black Swan
Best Director	Best Documentary Film
1. **David Fincher** - The Social Network; 2. Danny Boyle - 127 Hours; 3. Darren Aronofsky - Black Swan; 4. Christopher Nolan - Inception; 5. Tom Hooper - The King's Speech	1. **Waiting for "Superman"**; 2. Exit Through the Gift Shop; 3. Restrepo; 4. The Tillman Story; 5. Marwencol
Best Animated Film	Best Cinematography
1. **Toy Story 3**; 2. How to Train Your Dragon	1. **Anthony Dod Mantle** and **Enrique Chediak** - 127 Hours; 2. Wally Pfister - Inception
Best Screenplay	
1. **Aaron Sorkin** - The Social Network; 2. Christopher Nolan - Inception	

=== Individual awards ===
==== Russell Smith Award ====
- Winter's Bone, for "best low-budget or cutting-edge independent film"
