= The Town (2010 film) =

2010 American crime thriller film directed by Ben Affleck

- Theatrical release poster
- Directed by: Ben Affleck
- Screenplay by: Peter Craig; Ben Affleck; Aaron Stockard
- Based on: Prince of Thieves by Chuck Hogan
- Produced by: Graham King; Basil Iwanyk
- Starring: Ben Affleck; Rebecca Hall; Jon Hamm; Jeremy Renner; Blake Lively; Slaine; Titus Welliver; Pete Postlethwaite; Chris Cooper
- Cinematography: Robert Elswit
- Edited by: Dylan Tichenor
- Music by: Harry Gregson-Williams; David Buckley
- Production companies: Legendary Pictures; GK Films; Thunder Road Film
- Distributed by: Warner Bros. Pictures
- Release dates: September 8, 2010 (Venice); September 17, 2010 (United States)
- Running time: 124 minutes
- Country: United States
- Language: English
- Budget: $37 million
- Box office: $154 million

The Town is a 2010 American crime thriller film co-written and directed by Ben Affleck, adapted from Chuck Hogan's 2004 novel Prince of Thieves. The film stars Affleck, Rebecca Hall, Jon Hamm, Jeremy Renner, Blake Lively, Titus Welliver, Pete Postlethwaite, Chris Cooper and Slaine. Loosely inspired by true events, the film features a Boston bank robber who begins to develop romantic feelings for a victim of one of his previous robberies while he and his crew set out for one final score by robbing Fenway Park.

The Town premiered at the Venice Film Festival on September 8, 2010, and was released in the United States by Warner Bros. Pictures on September 17, 2010. The film received positive reviews from critics for its direction, screenplay, editing, and the performances of the cast, and grossed $154 million worldwide. It received various accolades, including the National Board of Review Award for Best Cast, while Renner was nominated for Best Supporting Actor at the Academy, Golden Globe, and SAG Awards, and Postlethwaite was posthumously nominated at the BAFTA Awards. The film was also honored as one of the top ten films of 2010 by the National Board of Review.

== Plot ==
Four lifelong friends from Charlestown, Boston—mild-mannered Doug MacRay, volatile James "Jem" Coughlin, Albert "Gloansy" MacGloan, and Desmond "Dez" Elden—rob a bank wearing latex skeleton masks. Against Doug's wishes, Jem takes bank manager Claire Keesey hostage, but later releases her unharmed.

After discovering Claire lives in their neighborhood, Doug surveils her to find out what she has told authorities, against the wishes of Jem, who believes they should simply kill her.

Doug introduces himself to Claire at a local laundromat. Claire does not recognize Doug's voice from the bank heist. Doug tells Claire of his missing mother, who probably lives with his aunt in Tangerine, Florida, and of being drafted as a professional ice hockey player. She tells him of the Fighting Irish leprechaun tattoo on the neck of one of the bank robbers (Jem); knowing that Jem will kill her if she reports this, Doug dissuades her from telling the FBI about the tattoo.

FBI Special Agent Adam Frawley suspects the bank heist crew has ties to local Irish mobster Fergus "Fergie" Colm, who fronts as a florist. During a visit to his father, Stephen, who is serving five consecutive life sentences in prison, Doug shares his plan to leave Boston for Florida.

The crew's next job is an armored car robbery in the North End, for which they don latex nun masks; the job goes awry when a guard is shot, and machine gun fire and a police chase ensue. The next day, Frawley interrogates Doug and his associates but is forced to release them for lack of evidence and failure to extract a confession.

Doug asks Claire to go to Florida, and she accepts. She quits her job, unaware that Frawley has wiretapped her phone. Frawley shares Doug's criminal file with Claire, and threatens to prosecute her as an accomplice. Shocked and distraught, she breaks up with Doug.

Doug tries to back out of an upcoming $3.5 million heist at Fenway Park, angering Jem and Fergie; the latter threatens to kill Claire if Doug does not partake in the robbery and reveals that he controlled Stephen by turning Doug's mother into an addict, which ultimately led to her suicide.

Doug reluctantly agrees to do the job, but swears he will kill Fergie if anything happens to Claire. At Fenway Park, Doug and Jem enter disguised as Boston police officers, with help from an inside accomplice, steal $3,500,000 in gate cash, and prepare to escape in an ambulance disguised as paramedics.

Unbeknownst to the crew, Frawley had used Doug's ex-girlfriend (and Jem's sister) Krista's drug addiction to turn her into an informant. The FBI, tipped off by Krista, surround the perimeter alongside police and state troopers. Caught in a shootout with FBI SWAT agents, Dez and Gloansy are killed. Frawley later spots Jem, and Jem is wounded in their exchange of gunfire. Determined not go back to prison, he commits suicide by cop. Doug witnesses his death before escaping in a police cruiser.

Knowing that Claire is in danger, Doug kills Fergie and his bodyguard Rusty. After contacting Claire, Doug spots the FBI with her, and she manages to warn him away. Doug escapes by donning an MBTA uniform from his uncle, and later boards a train to Florida. Frawley deduces that Claire tipped Doug off, but has insufficient grounds to arrest her.

Later, while Claire is gardening, she finds a buried bag containing money, a tangerine, and a note from Doug suggesting she can make better use of it and that they may meet again one day. Claire donates the money, in memory of Doug's mother, to refurbish the ice hockey arena where Doug played.

From the deck of a small house, Doug looks out over the water, forlorn, but seemingly safe in Florida.

== Cast ==
- Ben Affleck as Douglas "Doug" MacRay
- Rebecca Hall as Claire Keesey
- Jon Hamm as Special Agent Adam Frawley
- Jeremy Renner as James "Jem" Coughlin
- Blake Lively as Krista "Kris" Coughlin
- Chris Cooper as Stephen "Big Mac" MacRay
- Pete Postlethwaite as Fergus "Fergie" Colm
- Slaine as Albert "Gloansy" MacGloan
- Owen Burke as Desmond "Dez" Elden
- Titus Welliver as Det. Dino Ciampa
- Dennis McLaughlin as Russell "Rusty"
- Brian Scannell as Henry
- Isaac Bordoy as Alex Colazzo
- Jack Neary as Arnold Washton
- Edward O'Keefe as Morton Previt
- Victor Garber as David
- Bryan Connolly as MCI Junction Corrections Officer Ward

== Production ==
=== Pre-production ===
In 2003, Paramount Pictures had optioned the rights to Chuck Hogan's novel Prince of Thieves before it was even published, and Dick Wolf signed on to produce before the project fell through. In 2006, director Adrian Lyne brought the novel to producer Graham King. King in turn showed it to Warner Bros. studio, who agreed to make an adaptation directed by Lyne and written by Sheldon Turner. Lyne's vision for the project was a 3–3.5 hour Martin Scorsese-styled film with a budget of $90 million, which led to creative differences with the studio and the eventual departure of Lyne from the project. By 2008, The Town was decided as the title and Ben Affleck, fresh off his directorial debut in Gone Baby Gone, was brought in by Warner Bros. to serve as the film's star, director and co-writer. Affleck wanted to direct a movie "I personally researched and understood", and invited high school classmate Aaron Stockard to work with him on the script. While Affleck had grown up in nearby Cambridge, Massachusetts, he barely knew the harsh inner-city environment of Charlestown. Affleck and Stockard conducted many interviews with the Charlestown community, as well as the FBI Violent Crimes Task Force in Boston. Later the film's actors also researched within the community to make for more believable characters and performances. Charlestown locals also joined the cast, mostly as extras.

=== Filming ===
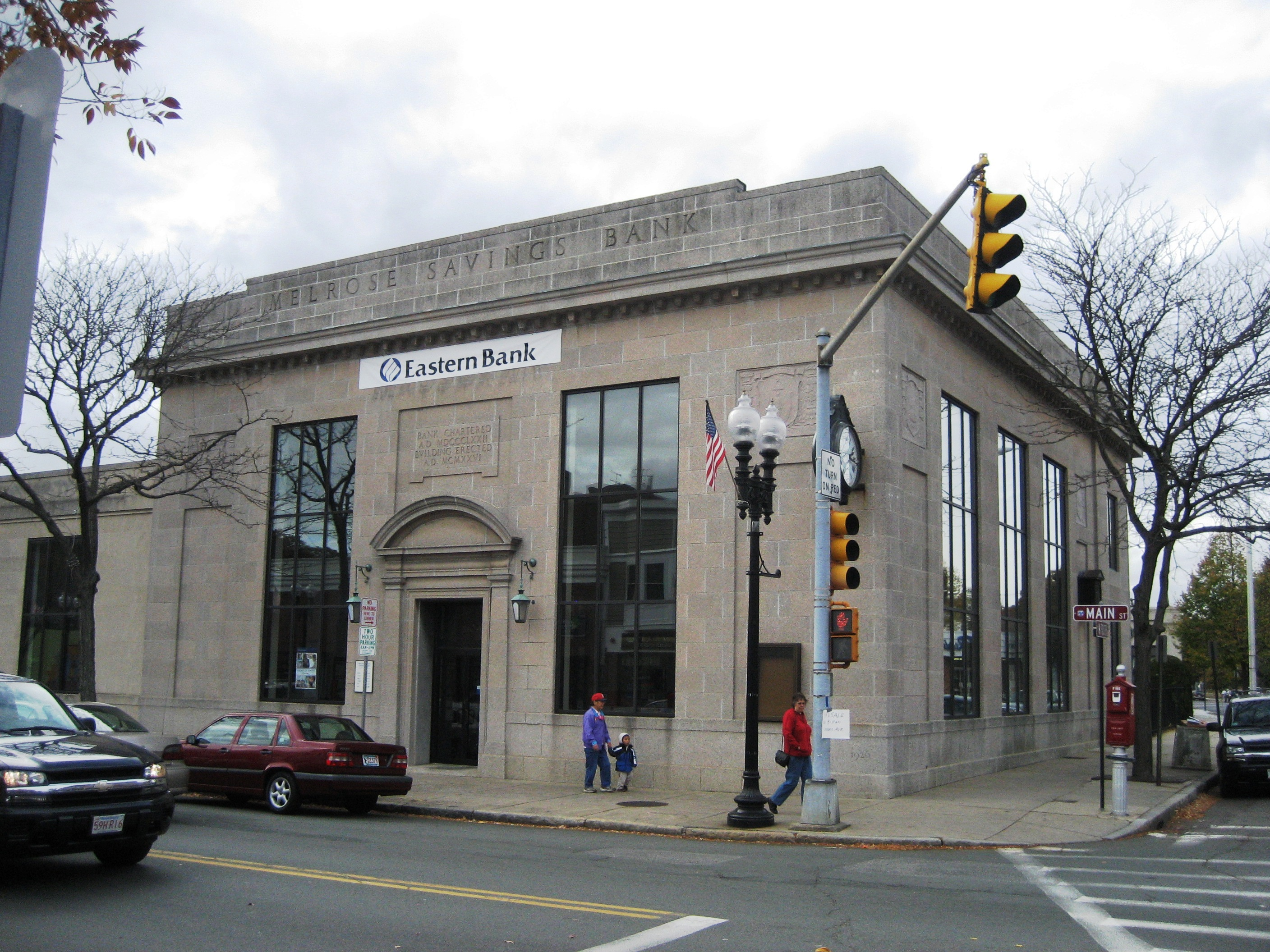
The exterior of a former MassBank branch in Melrose, Massachusetts, was used for the main robbery of the film.

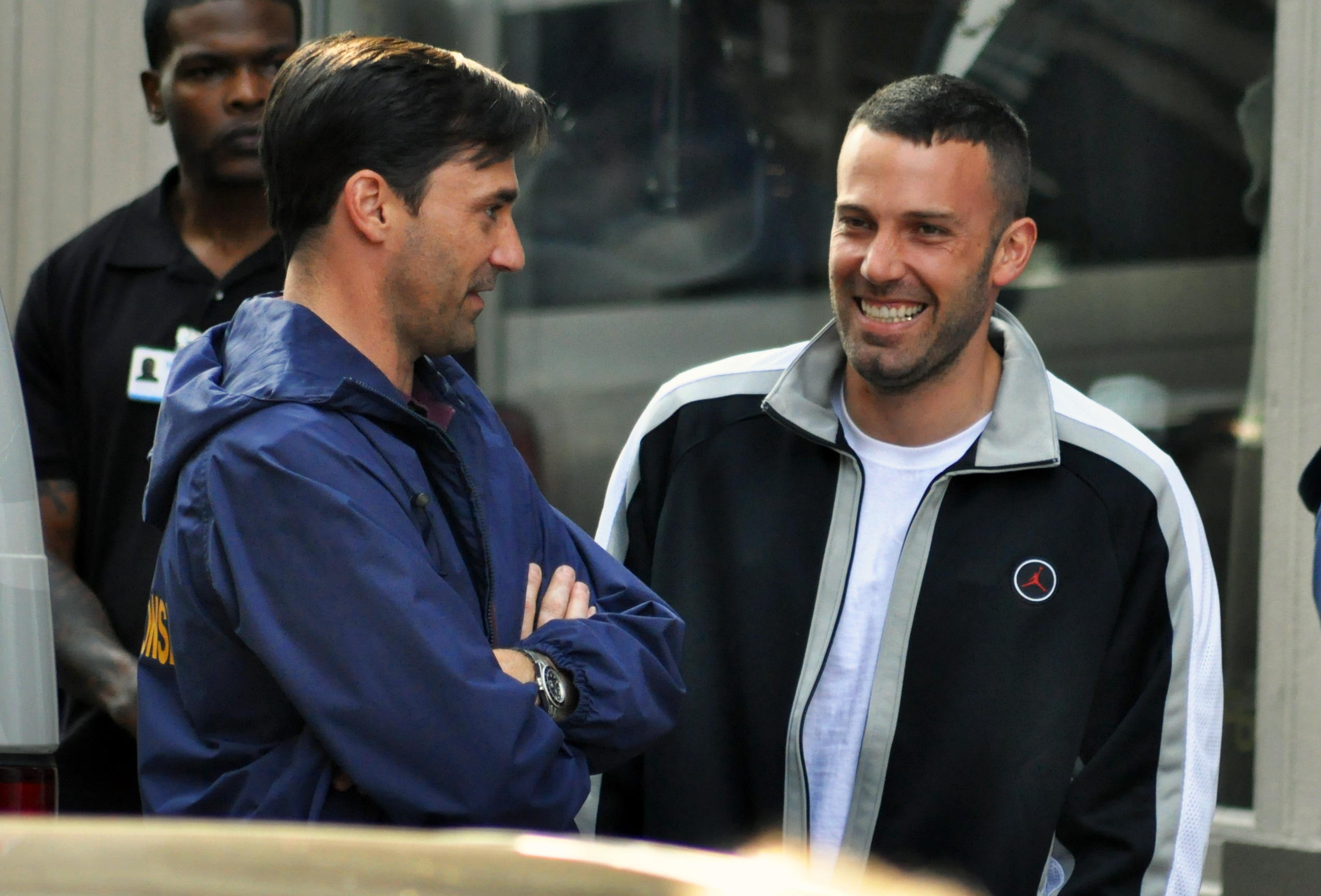
Jon Hamm and Ben Affleck chat on the set in Cambridge, Massachusetts

Filming began in late August 2009 in Boston. The former MASSBank branch located in Melrose, Massachusetts, was used as the location for the first robbery of the film, taking on the name Cambridge Merchants Bank (the exterior shots, however, are of Cambridge Savings Bank in Harvard Square). Filming also took place at Mohegan Sun in Uncasville, Connecticut, for casino scenes, Massachusetts Correctional Institution – Cedar Junction in Walpole, Massachusetts, for use of their visiting room, and at Anderson Regional Transportation Center in Woburn, Massachusetts, for the ending Amtrak scenes.

== Release ==
The Town debuted at the Venice Film Festival and had its American premiere at Boston's Fenway Park. The film was released in the United States on September 17, 2010.

=== Home media ===
The film was released on Blu-ray Disc and DVD on December 17, 2010. Both versions include special features and an audio commentary including a look at Affleck as a director and actor. The extended/unrated version is a Blu-ray/DVD/Digital Copy bundle which includes 28 minutes of additional footage, taking the runtime to over 153 minutes.

On March 6, 2011, the three-disc The Town: Ultimate Collector's Edition DVD/Blu-ray set was released. This set includes the previously released theatrical and extended cut Blu-ray disc as well as a second Blu-ray disc and a DVD which feature a new extended cut with an alternate, darker ending.

On December 6, 2016, the film was released on 4K UHD Blu-ray with the theatrical cut.

=== 2012 re-release ===
On February 5, 2012, to promote the upcoming The Town: Ultimate Collector's Edition set, the AMC Loews Boston Common theater hosted an "exclusive engagement" of The Town (Take 2), wherein three showings of the film were shown with the alternate ending featured in the new home media release. Immediately preceding each screening, a vice president from Warner Bros. Home Entertainment thanked all those in attendance, including Titus Welliver (Dino Ciampa), Dennis McLaughlin (Rusty), and Affleck's mother, for coming out and supporting director Affleck's "preferred" version of the film, leading to a short, prerecorded introduction by Affleck himself. Earlier that day, the intersection of Tremont and Avery streets was temporarily renamed "The Town Take 2 Place" in a small ceremony, attended by Welliver and Boston city officials.

== Reception ==
=== Box office ===
The film took #1 at the box office during its opening weekend, taking in $23.8 million. The Town grossed $92.1 million in the United States and Canada with an additional $61.8 million in other territories for a total of $154 million worldwide on a production budget of $37 million.

=== Critical response ===
On review aggregator Rotten Tomatoes, The Town has an approval rating of 92% based on 238 reviews, with an average rating of 7.70/10. The site's critical consensus reads, "Tense, smartly written, and wonderfully cast, The Town proves that Ben Affleck has rediscovered his muse—and that he's a director to be reckoned with." Metacritic gives the film a weighted average score of 74 out of 100, based on 42 critics, indicating "generally favorable reviews". Audiences polled by CinemaScore gave the film an average grade of "B+" on an A+ to F scale.

Roger Ebert gave the film 3 out of 4 stars, praising Renner's performance and Affleck's direction. In his review for The New York Times, A. O. Scott commented on the opening heist, "That sequence, like most of the other action set pieces in the film, is lean, brutal, and efficient, and evidence of Mr. Affleck's skill and self-confidence as a director." Xan Brooks, in The Guardian, wrote that the action sequences were "sharply orchestrated" but added "it's a bogus, bull-headed enterprise all the same; a film that leaves no cliche untrampled." Justin Chang wrote in Variety that the action scenes strike "an ideal balance between kineticism and clarity" aided by cinematographer Robert Elswit and film editor Dylan Tichenor. Richard Roeper of the Chicago Sun-Times gave the film an A+, noting that he found the film incredibly similar to Michael Mann's Heat, which he described as "one of [his] favorite movies of all time." The reviewers at Spill.com also praised one of the shootout scenes, saying "It is surely the best shootout scene we have seen in decades." Writing in the Seattle Post-Intelligencer, Laremy Lengel titled his review "The Town Works Best if You Avoid the Heat", also referencing Mann's film.

As a Boston-based crime drama, the film forms part of a "crime-movie subgenre" typically marked by "flavorsome accents, pungent atmosphere and fatalistic undertow", according to Chang. Within that subgenre, which includes The Boondock Saints, The Departed, Mystic River and Affleck's Gone Baby Gone, The Town is more of a straightforward crime-procedural and has a more optimistic outlook. The film also takes influence from Boston bank robbery film The Friends of Eddie Coyle; several scenes in The Town, including the release of the blindfolded hostage to walk to the water's edge, mirror sequences in this film.

=== Accolades ===
Award	Category	Subject	Result
National Board of Review Awards	Top Ten Films		Won
National Board of Review Awards	Best Acting by an Ensemble Cast		Won
Broadcast Film Critics Association Awards	Best Film		Nominated
Broadcast Film Critics Association Awards	Best Cast		Nominated
Broadcast Film Critics Association Awards	Best Screenplay	Ben Affleck, Peter Craig and Aaron Stockard	Nominated
Broadcast Film Critics Association Awards	Best Action Film		Nominated
Broadcast Film Critics Association Awards	Best Supporting Actor	Jeremy Renner	Nominated
Academy Awards	Best Supporting Actor	Jeremy Renner	Nominated
Golden Globe Awards	Best Supporting Actor	Jeremy Renner	Nominated
Screen Actors Guild Awards	Best Supporting Actor	Jeremy Renner	Nominated
Dallas–Fort Worth Film Critics Association Awards	Best Supporting Actor	Jeremy Renner	Nominated
National Society of Film Critics Awards	Best Supporting Actor	Jeremy Renner	Nominated
St. Louis Gateway Film Critics Association Awards	Best Supporting Actor	Jeremy Renner	Nominated
San Diego Film Critics Society Awards	Best Supporting Actor	Jeremy Renner	Nominated
San Diego Film Critics Society Awards	Best Supporting Actress	Blake Lively	Nominated
Satellite Awards	Best Supporting Actor	Jeremy Renner	Nominated
Satellite Awards	Best Adapted Screenplay	Peter Craig	Nominated
Satellite Awards	Best Adapted Screenplay	Aaron Stockard	Nominated
Satellite Awards	Best Adapted Screenplay	Ben Affleck	Nominated
Satellite Awards	Best Director	Ben Affleck	Nominated
Satellite Awards	Best Editing	Dylan Tichenor	Nominated
Producers Guild of America Awards	Best Film		Nominated
BAFTA Awards	Best Supporting Actor	Pete Postlethwaite (posthumous)	Nominated

== Factual accuracy ==
A voice in the trailer of the film says: "There are over 300 bank robberies in Boston every year. Most of these professionals live in a 1-square-mile neighborhood called Charlestown." In fact, there were 23 reported bank robberies in the entire state of Massachusetts in the first quarter of 2010, compared with 49 in Illinois and 136 in California, according to the FBI.

The film drew criticism from residents of the Charlestown, Boston neighborhood due to the film's promotion as being about "the bank robbery capital of America." While specific bank robbery crime statistics were not available for the area, Greg Comcowich, Boston Federal Bureau of Investigation spokesman, said it was a "pretty good conclusion" that the characterization was inaccurate.

The film ends with a written disclaimer: "Charlestown's reputation as a breeding ground for armed robbers is authentic. However, this film all but ignores the great majority of the residents of Charlestown, past and present, who are the same good and true people found most anywhere," to whom the film is dedicated.

According to a September 2010 article in The Boston Globe, Charlestown was once known as an area where bank robbers were concentrated, but has not been since the mid-1990s, and the subject has been a sore point for "Townies". Now much of the neighborhood has been gentrified. The paper reported there is some sense of rivalry between Townies, people who lived in the historically Irish-Catholic neighborhood for decades, and "Toonies", largely white-collar workers who arrived with gentrification, but most of that has died down. The film makes reference to the definition of "Toonies" during one of Doug and Claire's dates.

In the early 1990s, an increase in the number of bank and armored car robberies by Townies focused attention on Charlestown. In one heist in Hudson, New Hampshire, two guards were killed, which is alluded to in the film; during a scene where Agent Frawley is briefing his task force, he mentions that Doug's father is serving life for a notorious robbery in Nashua. According to Frawley, the elder MacRay hijacked a "bread truck" (armored car) up to New Hampshire, and when one of the guards saw his face, he executed both of them with their own weapons. Frawley notes that this incident led to the passing of regulations prohibiting the driver from leaving the cab even if his partner is being held at gunpoint. Charles Hogan got the idea for his novel, on which the film is based, in 1995. "It was just so remarkable that this one very small community was the focus for bank robbers," he said, but he was very aware that crime was only one part of the community, and he did not want to make all residents of the neighborhood look like criminals.

== See also ==
- Heist film
- List of hood films
