= True Grit (2010 film) =

2010 film by Joel and Ethan Coen

- Theatrical release poster
- Directed by: Joel Coen; Ethan Coen
- Screenplay by: Joel Coen; Ethan Coen
- Based on: True Grit by Charles Portis
- Produced by: Joel Coen; Ethan Coen; Scott Rudin
- Starring: Jeff Bridges; Matt Damon; Josh Brolin; Barry Pepper; Hailee Steinfeld
- Cinematography: Roger Deakins
- Edited by: Roderick Jaynes (Note: Roderick Jaynes is the shared pseudonym used by the Coen brothers for their editing.)
- Music by: Carter Burwell
- Production companies: Skydance Productions; Amblin Entertainment; Scott Rudin Productions; Mike Zoss Productions
- Distributed by: Paramount Pictures
- Release date: December 22, 2010
- Running time: 110 minutes
- Country: United States
- Language: English
- Budget: $35–38 million
- Box office: $252.3 million

True Grit is a 2010 American Western film produced, written, and directed by Joel Coen and Ethan Coen. It is an adaptation of Charles Portis's 1968 novel. Starring Jeff Bridges and Hailee Steinfeld (in her theatrical film debut), True Grit also stars Matt Damon, Josh Brolin, and Barry Pepper. In the film, 14-year-old farm girl Mattie Ross (Steinfeld) hires boozy, trigger-happy lawman Rooster Cogburn (Bridges) to go after outlaw Tom Chaney (Brolin), who murdered her father, accompanied by Texas Ranger LaBoeuf (Damon), who is also hunting Chaney, and who has his own gripes with Cogburn.

The Coens intended their film to be a more faithful adaptation of Portis's novel than the 1969 version starring John Wayne; in particular, they wanted to tell the story from Mattie's point of view. The casting call for the role of Mattie received some 15,000 applicants before Steinfeld was selected. Principal photography occurred mainly in the Santa Fe, New Mexico area in March–April 2010. True Grit was shot by cinematographer Roger Deakins and scored by composer Carter Burwell—both Coen regulars—while the brothers themselves edited the film, under the Roderick Jaynes pseudonym.

True Grit was released in theatres in the United States by Paramount Pictures on December 22, 2010. The film grossed $252 million worldwide on a $35–38 million production budget, and was very well received by critics, with particular praise for its acting, directing, writing, score, and production values, with some deeming it superior to the earlier adaptation. Rated one of the best films of 2010, True Grit received several awards and nominations; at the 83rd Academy Awards, it received 10 nominations, including Best Picture, but won none.

== Plot ==
In 1878, 14-year-old Mattie Ross travels to Fort Smith, Arkansas, after her father is murdered by hired hand Tom Chaney. Sent to collect her father's body, she learns that Chaney has likely fled with "Lucky" Ned Pepper and his gang into Indian Territory, where the local sheriff has no authority. She inquires about hiring a deputy U.S. Marshal. The sheriff gives three recommendations, and Mattie chooses the "meanest" one, Rooster Cogburn, who initially rebuffs her offer, doubting her grit and her wealth, but she raises the money by aggressive horse trading.

Texas Ranger LaBoeuf arrives in town, pursuing Chaney for the murder of a state senator. LaBoeuf proposes joining Cogburn, but Mattie refuses his offer. She wishes Chaney to be hanged in Arkansas for her father's murder, not Texas. Mattie insists on traveling with Cogburn to bear witness to justice, but he departs without her, accompanying LaBoeuf to apprehend Chaney and split the reward.

After catching up with the lawmen, Mattie is spanked for her "insolence" by LaBoeuf, until Cogburn draws his weapon on him. This, combined with their differing opinions of William Quantrill, prompts Cogburn to end his arrangement with LaBoeuf, who leaves to pursue Chaney on his own. At a rural dugout, Cogburn and Mattie find outlaws Quincy and Moon, who surrender after Cogburn shoots and injures Moon. Initially, the outlaws deny any knowledge of Ned Pepper or Chaney, but Cogburn, using Moon's worsening injury as leverage, convinces him to cooperate. Quincy, enraged, stabs Moon and is killed by Cogburn. A dying Moon reveals that Pepper's gang will arrive at the dugout that night for supplies.

Cogburn and Mattie plan an ambush, but LaBoeuf arrives first and is confronted by the gang. Cogburn shoots two gang members and accidentally hits LaBoeuf, but Pepper escapes. Due to his substantial injuries, LaBoeuf rejoins Cogburn and Mattie. The next morning, the three set off again in pursuit of Chaney and the gang, who Cogburn believes may be hiding out in the Winding Stair Mountains. After days of searching, the three find no trace of Chaney or the Pepper gang. Drunk, Cogburn declares that the trail has gone cold and quits the pursuit. LaBoeuf leaves the posse, declaring that he will return to Texas. Mattie expresses regret to LaBoeuf that she hired the wrong man, and they reconcile, admitting they misjudged each other.

While retrieving water from a stream, Mattie happens upon Chaney. She shoots and wounds him, but her revolver misfires, allowing Chaney to take her hostage. Ned Pepper convinces Cogburn to leave the area by threatening to kill Mattie. Pepper then departs with his gang, stating that someone will return with a horse for Chaney and instructing him to not harm Mattie while they wait. Chaney, musing that Pepper has abandoned him to be captured by the law, attempts to kill Mattie. LaBoeuf arrives and knocks Chaney unconscious, revealing that he and Cogburn reunited shortly after the initial gunfight. He was to rescue Mattie while Cogburn intercepts the gang in a four-to-one standoff.

Cogburn and the outlaws charge at each other, with Cogburn killing two gang members and forcing a third to flee before his own horse is shot and falls, trapping him. Alone and mortally wounded, Pepper prepares to execute Cogburn, but LaBoeuf shoots Pepper from 400 yards with his rifle. Chaney regains consciousness and knocks out LaBoeuf, but Mattie seizes the rifle and shoots Chaney dead. The recoil knocks her into a snake den, where she is bitten in the hand by a rattlesnake. Cogburn ropes in, shoots the snakes, and rescues Mattie, thanking LaBoeuf and promising to send help for him before departing with Mattie to reach a doctor. After their horse collapses from exhaustion, Cogburn shoots it and carries Mattie on foot to reach help. Despite staying with her until she is out of danger, Cogburn is gone by the time she regains consciousness, and her arm is amputated.

Twenty-five years later, Mattie receives a letter from Cogburn inviting her to attend a traveling Wild West show in which he is performing. When she arrives at the show's location, she is informed by Cole Younger and Frank James that Cogburn had died three days earlier. Mattie, who never married, has Cogburn's body moved to her family cemetery in Yell County, Arkansas. She does not know what came of LaBoeuf, but expresses hope that she might still find him, while musing that "time gets away from us."

== Cast ==
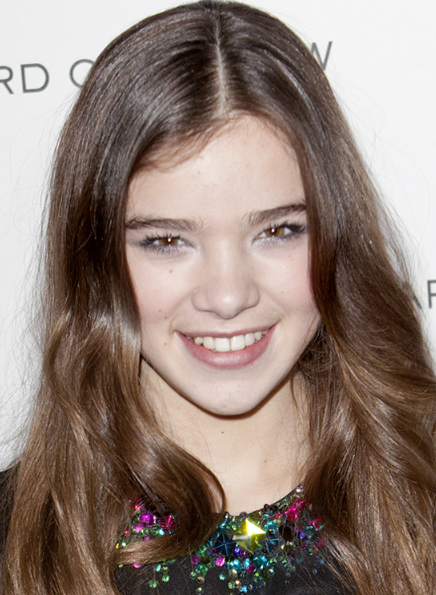
Hailee Steinfeld was cast as Mattie Ross from among 15,000 applicants.

- Jeff Bridges as Deputy U.S. Marshal Rooster Cogburn
- Hailee Steinfeld as Mattie Ross
  - Elizabeth Marvel as 40-year-old Mattie
- Matt Damon as Texas Ranger LaBoeuf
- Josh Brolin as Tom Chaney
- Barry Pepper as "Lucky" Ned Pepper
- Domhnall Gleeson as Moon (the Kid)
- Bruce Green as Harold Parmalee
- Ed Corbin as Bear Man (Dr. Forster)
- Roy Lee Jones as Yarnell Poindexter
- Paul Rae as Emmett Quincy
- Nicholas Sadler as Sullivan
- Dakin Matthews as Colonel Stonehill
- Leon Russom as Sheriff
- Jake Walker as Judge Isaac C. Parker
- Don Pirl as Cole Younger
- Jarlath Conroy as the Undertaker
- Jonathan Joss as Condemned Indian
- J. K. Simmons as J. Noble Daggett, Mattie's lawyer (voice only; uncredited)

== Production ==
=== Development ===
The project was confirmed in March 2009. Ahead of shooting, Ethan Coen said that the film would be a more faithful adaptation of the novel than the 1969 version.

It's partly a question of point-of-view. The book is entirely in the voice of the 14-year-old girl. That sort of tips the feeling of it over a certain way. I think [the book is] much funnier than the movie was so I think, unfortunately, they lost a lot of humor in both the situations and in her voice. It also ends differently than the movie did. You see the main character – the little girl – 25 years later when she's an adult. Another way in which it's a little bit different from the movie – and maybe this is just because of the time the movie was made – is that it's a lot tougher and more violent than the movie reflects. Which is part of what's interesting about it.

Mattie Ross "is a pill," said Ethan Coen in a December 2010 interview, "but there is something deeply admirable about her in the book that we were drawn to," including the Presbyterian-Protestant ethic so strongly imbued in a 14-year-old girl. Joel Coen said that the brothers did not want to "mess around with what we thought was a very compelling story and character." The film's producer, Scott Rudin, said that the Coens had taken a "formal, reverent approach" to the Western genre, with its emphasis on adventure and quest. "The patois of the characters, the love of language that permeates the whole film, makes it very much of a piece with their other films, but it is the least ironic in many regards."

Nevertheless, the film adaptation differs from the original novel in subtle ways. This is particularly evident in the negotiation scene between Mattie and her father's undertaker. In the film, Mattie bargains over her father's casket and proceeds to spend the night among the corpses to avoid paying for the boardinghouse. This scene is, in fact, nonexistent in the novel, where Mattie is depicted as refusing to bargain over her father's body and never entertaining the thought of sleeping among the corpses.

=== Casting ===
Open casting sessions were held in Texas in November 2009 for the role of Mattie Ross. The following month, Paramount Pictures announced a casting search for a 12- to 16-year-old girl, describing the character as a "simple, tough-as-nails young woman" whose "unusually steely nerves and straightforward manner are often surprising." Steinfeld, then 13, was selected for the role from a pool of 15,000 applicants. "It was, as you can probably imagine, the source of a lot of anxiety", Ethan Coen told The New York Times. "We were aware if the kid doesn't work, there's no movie." Steinfeld wore her costume in the audition and she give her vision for the character, her vision clicked with the Coens. Natalia Dyer and Madelyn Cline auditioned for Mattie, Dyer was reportedly "one of the top candidates for the role."

For the final segment of the film, a one-armed body double was needed for Elizabeth Marvel, who played the adult Mattie. After a nationwide call, the Coen brothers cast Ruth Morris – a 29-year-old social worker and student who was born without a left forearm.

=== Filming ===
The film was shot in the Santa Fe area from March 22 to April 27, 2010, as well as in Texas (Bartlett, Granger, and Austin). The first trailer was released in September; a second one premiered with The Social Network.

=== Soundtrack ===
Johnny Cash's rendition of "God's Gonna Cut You Down" was used in the theatrical trailer. The 1887 hymn "Leaning on the Everlasting Arms" is used as Mattie Ross' theme, and about a quarter of the score is based on it. Iris DeMent's version, from her 2004 album Lifeline, is used during the end credits. Other hymns are also referenced in the score, including "What a Friend We Have in Jesus", "Hold to God's Unchanging Hand", and "The Glory-Land Way". Because the hymns are considered pre-composed music, the score was deemed ineligible to be nominated for Best Original Score in the 2010 Academy Awards.

== Reception ==
=== Box office ===
True Grit was released in North America on December 22, 2010. It was a commercial success, grossing $171,243,005 in North America alone, $81,033,922 in other territories, and $252,276,927 worldwide, with a budget of $35–38 million. Its box-office ranking for all-time United States was number 296; worldwide it was number 611.

In the holiday weekend following its December 22 North American debut, True Grit took in $25.6 million at the box office, twice its prerelease projections. By its second weekend ending January 2, the film had earned $87.1 million domestically, becoming the Coen brothers' highest-grossing film, surpassing No Country for Old Men, which earned $74.3 million. True Grit was the only mainstream movie of the 2010 holiday season to exceed the revenue expectations of its producers. Based on that performance, The Los Angeles Times predicted that the film would likely become the second-highest grossing Western of all time when inflation is discounted, exceeded only by Dances with Wolves.

The Coen brothers, as well as Paramount executive Rob Moore, attributed True Grit's success partly to its "soft" PG-13 rating, atypical for a Coen brothers film, which helped broaden audience appeal. Paramount anticipated that the film would be popular with the adults who often constitute the Coen brothers' core audience, as well as fans of the Western genre, but True Grit also drew extended families - parents, grandparents, and teenagers. Geographically, the film played strongest in Los Angeles and New York City, but its top-20 markets also included Oklahoma City; Plano, Texas; and Olathe, Kansas.

=== Critical reception ===
True Grit received critical acclaim. On Rotten Tomatoes, 95% of critics gave the film a positive review based on 280 reviews, with an average rating of 8.10/10 and with its consensus stating: "Girded by strong performances from Jeff Bridges, Matt Damon, and newcomer Hailee Steinfeld, and lifted by some of the Coens' most finely tuned, unaffected work, True Grit is a worthy companion to the Charles Portis book." Metacritic gave the film an average score of 80 out of 100 based on 41 reviews from mainstream critics, indicating "generally favorable reviews". Audiences polled by CinemaScore gave the film an average grade of "B+" on an A+ to F scale.

Roger Ebert awarded 3.5 stars out of 4, writing, "What strikes me is that I'm describing the story and the film as if it were simply, if admirably, a good Western. That's a surprise to me, because this is a film by the Coen Brothers, and this is the first straight genre exercise in their career. It's a loving one. Their craftsmanship is a wonder," and also remarking, "(t)he cinematography by Roger Deakins reminds us of the glory that was, and can still be, the Western." Total Film gave the film a five-star review: "This isn't so much a remake as a masterly re-creation. Not only does it have the drop on the 1969 version, it's the first great movie of 2011."

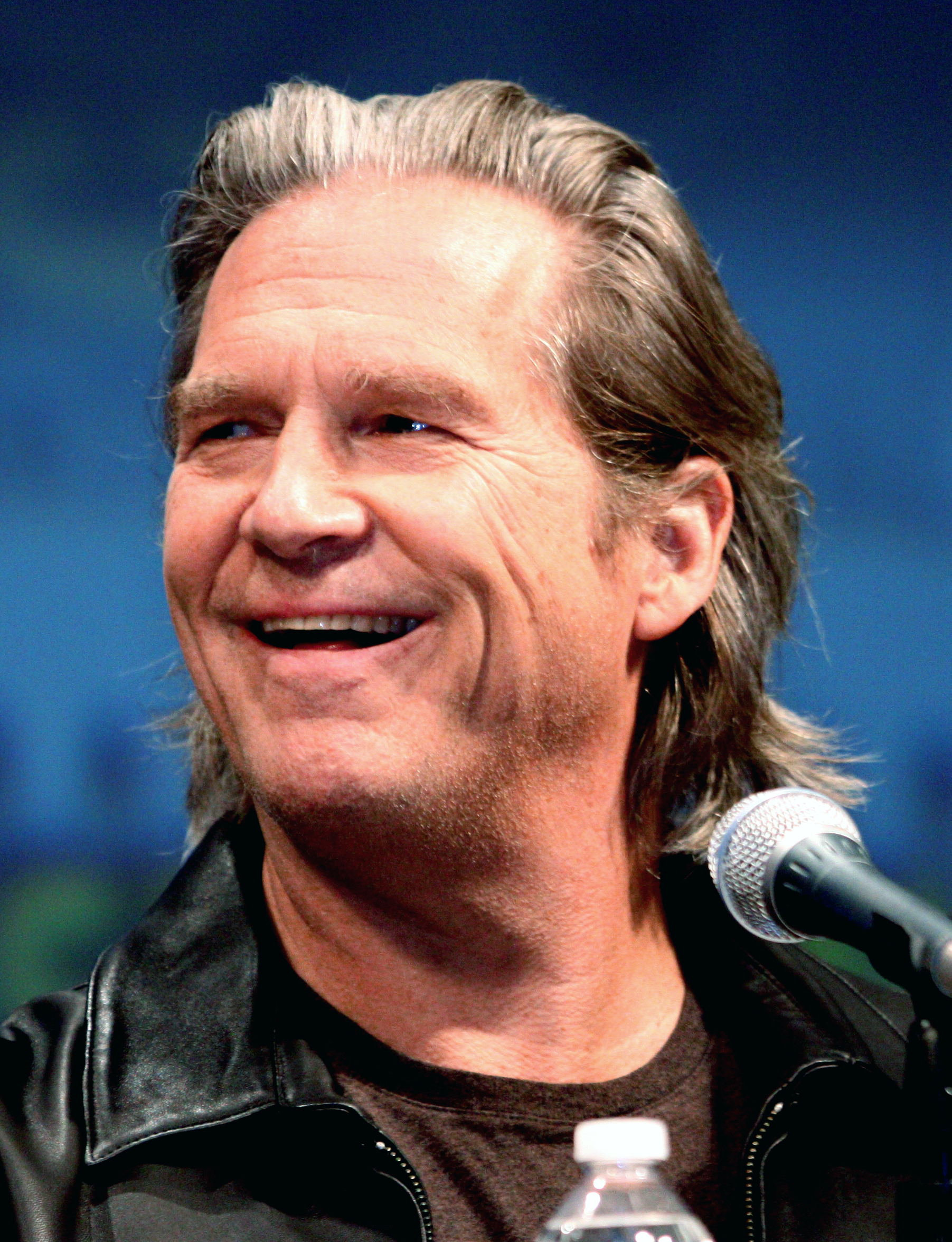
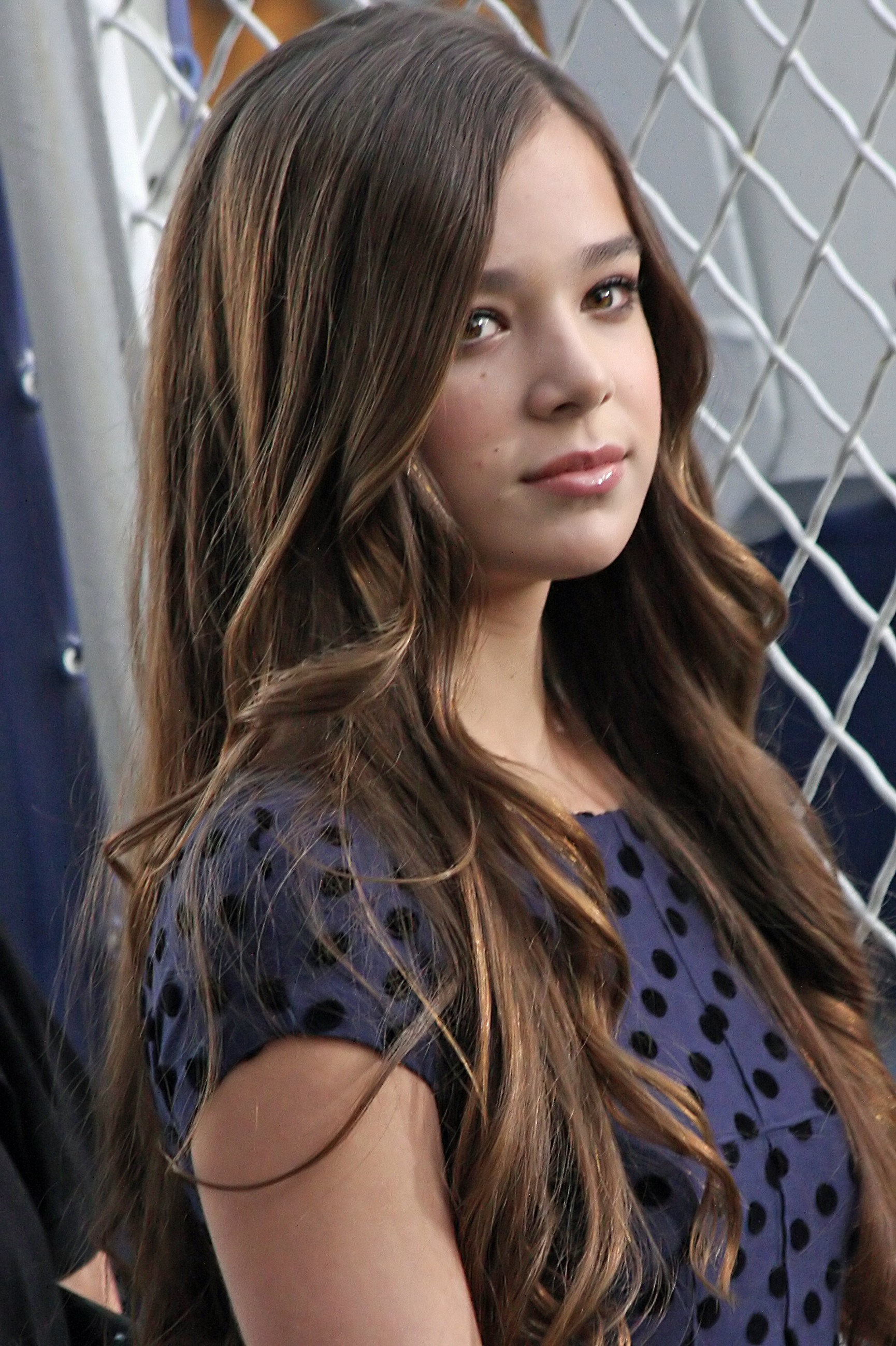
The performances of Jeff Bridges and Hailee Steinfeld garnered critical acclaim, earning them Academy Award nominations for Best Actor and Best Supporting Actress respectively.

Los Angeles Times critic Kenneth Turan gave the film 4 out of 5 stars, writing, "The Coens, not known for softening anything, have restored the original's bleak, elegiac conclusion and as writer-directors have come up with a version that shares events with the first film, but is much closer in tone to the book ... Clearly recognizing a kindred spirit in Portis, sharing his love for eccentric characters and odd language, they worked hard, and successfully, at serving the buoyant novel, as well as being true to their own black comic brio."

In his review for the Minneapolis Star Tribune, Colin Covert wrote: "the Coens dial down the eccentricity and deliver their first classically made, audience-pleasing genre picture. The results are masterful." Richard Corliss of Time named Steinfeld's performance as one of the best of 2010, saying "She delivers the orotund dialogue as if it were the easiest vernacular, stares down bad guys, wins hearts. That's a true gift."

Rex Reed of the New York Observer criticized the film's pacing, referring to plot points as "mere distractions ... to divert attention from the fact that nothing is going on elsewhere." Reed considers Damon "hopelessly miscast" and finds Bridges' performance mumbly, lumbering, and self-indulgent. Entertainment Weekly gave the movie a B+: "Truer than the John Wayne showpiece and less gritty than the book, this True Grit is just tasty enough to leave movie lovers hungry for a missing spice."

=== Accolades ===
The film won the Broadcast Film Critics Association Award for Best Young Performer (Hailee Steinfeld) and received ten additional nominations in the following categories: Best Film, Best Actor (Jeff Bridges), Best Supporting Actress (Steinfeld), Best Director, Best Adapted Screenplay, Best Cinematography, Best Art Direction, Best Costume Design, Best Makeup, and Best Score. The ceremony took place on January 14, 2011.

It was nominated for two Screen Actors Guild Awards: Best Actor in a Leading Role (Bridges) and Best Actress in a Supporting Role (Steinfeld). The ceremony took place on January 30, 2011.

It was nominated for eight British Academy Film Awards: Best Film, Best Actor in a Leading Role (Bridges), Best Actress in a Leading Role (Steinfeld), Best Adapted Screenplay, Best Cinematography, Best Production Design, Best Costume Design. Roger Deakins won the award for Best Cinematography.

It was nominated for 10 Academy Awards, but won none: Best Picture, Best Director, Best Adapted Screenplay, Best Actor (Bridges), Best Supporting Actress (Steinfeld), Best Art Direction, Best Cinematography, Best Costume Design, Best Sound Mixing, and Best Sound Editing. When told of all the nominations, the Coen brothers stated, "Ten seems like an awful lot. We don't want to take anyone else's."

=== Legacy ===
The film has maintained its stature over time with Comic Book Resources noting "Fifteen years after True Grit was released, it's become even clearer to see how the film made its impact on the Western genre." Nick Stanforth of Boy Genius Report has called the film "one of the rare remakes that arguably surpasses its predecessor" and Debopriyaa Dutta of /Film praised the film for being more faithful, showing a more book-accurate Rooster Cogburn than the one that was "diluted in the 1969 version."

== Home media ==
True Grit was released on DVD and Blu-ray on June 7, 2011.

In 2023, the film became the final movie sent by Netflix through mail, ultimately ending the company's 25-year-old service of mailing DVDs and Blu-rays.
